= I'll Be Waving as You Drive Away =

- Little House on the Prairie episodes
- Episode nos.: Season 4 Episodes 21-22
- Directed by: William F. Claxton
- Written by: Blanche Hanalis
- Teleplay by: Carole Raschella; Michael Raschella
- Cinematography by: Haskell B. Boggs
- Editing by: Jerry Taylor
- Production code: 4021/4022
- Original air date: March 6, 1978
- Running time: 120 minutes

"I'll Be Waving as You Drive Away" is the 21st and 22nd episodes of the fourth season of Little House on the Prairie. It aired in two parts on NBC, part 1 on March 6, 1978, part 2 on March 13, 1978.

In the episode, Mary begins to lose her eyesight as the result of damage when she had scarlet fever. She eventually becomes totally blind, and Charles and Caroline take her to Iowa to a school for the blind.

The episode garnered an Emmy nomination for Melissa Sue Anderson and was ranked #97 in TV Guide's ''Top 100 Episodes of All Time'' 1997 list. It moved up to #71 in TV Guide's revised 2009 list.

== Synopsis ==
=== Part I ===
Laura has met a new boy in town, Seth Barton, but she finds that he's more interested in Mary. Mary is also studying for the state teacher's exam, but her long hours of study are made difficult by blurred vision. Knocking over an oil lamp she was using to help see her study materials better, Mary causes a fire in the house. Charles takes Mary to see an optometrist, Dr. Burke, where he learns that Mary is going blind from complications of her having had scarlet fever. Charles, in self denial, cannot bring himself to tell Mary the news, and one morning she wakes to find that she is completely blind.

=== Part II ===
The family learns of a school for the blind, but it's in Iowa. Charles and Caroline take her to the school, as Mary struggles with bitterness over her blindness. At the school, she meets Adam Kendall, who is also blind. He forces her to learn to fend for herself and overcome her limitations.

While Charles and Caroline are gone, the town of Walnut Grove is struggling with bankruptcy.

== Cast ==
- Michael Landon as Charles Ingalls
- Karen Grassle as Caroline Quiner Ingalls
- Melissa Gilbert as Laura Ingalls Wilder
- Melissa Sue Anderson as Mary Ingalls Kendall
- Lindsay and Sidney Greenbush as Carrie Ingalls
- Richard Bull as Nels Oleson (credited Part II only)
- Dabbs Greer as Rev. Robert Alden
- Kevin Hagen as Dr. Hiram Baker
- Katherine MacGregor as Harriet Oleson
- Charlotte Stewart as Eva Beadle Simms (credited Part II only)
- Karl Swenson as Lars Hanson
- Ford Rainey as Dr. Burke (credited Part I only)
- David Opatoshu as Taylor Nash (credited Part II only)
- Linwood Boomer as Adam Kendall (credited Part II only)
- Merlin Olsen as Jonathan Garvey
- Rob Kenneally as Seth Barton
- Alison Arngrim as Nellie Oleson Dalton
- Jonathan Gilbert as Willie Oleson
- Patrick Labyorteaux as Andrew "Andy" Garvey (credited Part II only)
- Hersha Parady as Alice Garvey (credited Part II only)
- Peter Haas as Paul (credited Part II only)
- Jennifer Factor as Jenny (credited Part II only)

== Background ==
=== Development ===
As with many of the show's early scripts, the idea for the events were taken from Laura Ingalls Wilder's original Little House on the Prairie books, although they were embellished with additional fictional details. For example, in the original version of Laura Ingalls Wilder's stories, Mary goes blind as a result of scarlet fever, with the family struggling for years before they save enough money to send her to a school for the blind. The historical Mary never married, nor became a teacher. Michael Landon's original plan for the series did not intend to have Mary go blind, instead having her need glasses.

=== Writing ===
The original script was written by Carole and Michael Raschella.

=== Casting ===
Filming of the episode was the last episode shot with Charlotte Steward as Eva Beadle Simms.

Ultimately, the limitations upon the character of Mary led to Melissa Sue Anderson leaving the show.

== Themes and analysis ==
In contrast to the original version of events in which Mary goes blind right after having had scarlet fever, and never marries nor becomes a teacher, the television version of the story is presented as a monomyth. "I'll Be Waving as You Drive Away" includes a redemption scheme that departs from the historical version as presented in By the Shores of Silver Lake. Michael Landon's original concept for the show did not include Mary suffering blindness at all, instead having her receive glasses, which she did in the season 2 episode "Four Eyes". It isn't until two and a half seasons later, when she finally does succumb to blindness, the family is able to send her immediately to a school for the blind. Mary's rage turns to hope as she meets the man she will marry and hopes to become a teacher.

Unusual for the time period was showing a regular character with a disability. Although Braille was described and shown in the show, the materials were historically inaccurate.

== Reception ==
The episode resulted in an Emmy nomination for Melissa Sue Anderson. It was the episode's only nomination for an Emmy.

The episode was #97 in TV Guide's ''Top 100 Episodes of All Time'' 1997 list. It moved up to #71 in the revised 2009 list.
