= List of Little House on the Prairie characters =

There are many Little House on the Prairie characters, appearing in various forms of media in the Little House on the Prairie media franchise.

== Television series characters ==
=== Cast timeline ===
Actor	Character	Pilot movie	Little House on the Prairie								A New Beginning	Movie specials
Actor	Character	Pilot movie	1	2	3	4	5	6	7	8	9	Movie specials
Michael Landon	Charles Ingalls	Main	Main	Main	Main	Main	Main	Main	Main	Main	Guest	Guest
Karen Grassle	Caroline Ingalls	Main	Main	Main	Main	Main	Main	Main	Main	Main		Guest
Melissa Gilbert	Laura Ingalls Wilder	Main	Main	Main	Main	Main	Main	Main	Main	Main	Main	Main
Melissa Sue Anderson	Mary Ingalls Kendall	Main	Main	Main	Main	Main	Main	Main	Main	Guest		
Lindsay Sidney Greenbush	Carrie Ingalls	Main	Main	Main	Main	Main	Main	Main	Main	Main		
Dean Butler	Almanzo Wilder							Starring	Starring	Starring	Main	Main
Katherine MacGregor	Harriet Oleson		Starring	Starring	Starring	Starring	Starring	Starring	Starring	Starring	Main	
Richard Bull	Nels Oleson		Starring	Starring	Starring	Starring	Starring	Starring	Starring	Starring	Main	Main
Victor French	Isaiah Edwards	Guest	Recurring	Recurring	Recurring			Guest		Recurring	Main	Main
(Note: These below cast members appear in the opening credits after the main characters but before the guest actors and crew credits. Unlike the main characters, they are only credited when they appear. In the first four seasons, they are credited under "The Town".)
Kevin Hagen	Dr. Hiram Baker		Starring	Starring	Starring	Starring	Starring	Starring	Starring	Starring	Starring	Starring
Karl Swenson	Lars Hanson		Starring	Starring	Starring	Starring	Guest					
Dabbs Greer	Rev. Robert Alden		Starring	Starring	Starring	Starring	Starring	Starring	Starring	Starring	Starring	Starring
Charlotte Stewart	Eva Beadle Simms		Starring	Starring	Starring	Starring						
Ted Gehring	Ebenezer Sprague		(Note: Gehring initially appears as Ed Stacy in "Money Crop" (1.20).)	Starring	Starring							
Jim Jeter	Hans Dorfler		Guest	Guest	Starring	Starring		Guest				
Alison Arngrim	Nellie Oleson Dalton		Recurring	Recurring	Recurring	Recurring	Starring	Starring	Starring		Guest	
Jonathan Gilbert	Willie Oleson		Recurring	Recurring	Recurring	Recurring	Starring	Starring	Starring	Starring	Starring	Starring
Merlin Olsen	Jonathan Garvey					Recurring	Starring	Starring	Starring			
Hersha Parady	Alice Garvey				(Note: Parady initially appears as Eliza Ingalls in "Journey in the Spring" (3.6).)	Recurring	Starring	Starring				
Patrick Labyorteaux	Andy Garvey					Recurring	Starring	Starring	Starring			
Matthew Labyorteaux	Albert Quinn Ingalls				(Note: Laborteaux initially appears as young Charles Ingalls in "Journey in the Spring" (3.6) and "I Remember, I Remember" (4.16).)		Starring	Starring	Starring	Starring	Guest	Guest
Linwood Boomer	Adam Kendall					Guest	Starring	Starring	Starring	Starring		
Lucy Lee Flippin	Eliza Jane Wilder							Starring	Guest	Recurring		
Steve Tracy	Percival Dalton							Guest	Starring			
Allison Balson	Nancy Oleson									Starring	Starring	Starring
Jason Bateman	James Cooper Ingalls								Guest	Starring		
Missy Francis	Cassandra Cooper Ingalls								Guest	Starring		
Wendi & Brenda Turnbaugh	Grace Ingalls						Recurring	Recurring	Recurring	Starring		
Ketty Lester	Hester-Sue Terhune					(Note: Lester initially appears as Janie Kagan in "The Fighter" (4.10).)	Recurring	Recurring	Recurring	Starring	Starring	
Stan Ivar	John Carter										Starring	Starring
Pamela Roylance	Sarah Reed Carter										Starring	Starring
Lindsay Kennedy	Jeb Carter										Starring	Starring
David Friedman	Jason Carter										Starring	Starring
Shannen Doherty	Jenny Wilder										Starring	Starring
Leslie Landon	Etta Plum		(Note: Landon also appears as Leslie in "Plague" (1.18), Kate in "The Election" (3.20), an extra in "Harriet's Happening" (5.8), Marge Loren in "The Third Miracle" (6.4), Pam in "A Wiser Heart (8.5).)								Starring	Starring
Robert Casper	Sherwood Montague										Guest	Starring
Sherri Stoner	Rachel Brown Oleson										Guest	Starring

Cast notes

=== The Ingalls family ===
Name	Seasons	No. of episodes	Portrayer	Character summary
Charles Ingalls	1–9	161	Michael Landon	Farmer; husband, father and grandfather
Caroline Ingalls	1–8	172	Karen Grassle	Wife, mother, teacher and grandmother
Laura Ingalls Wilder	1–9	190	Melissa Gilbert	Daughter; became teacher, later Almanzo's wife and Rose's mother; nicknamed "Half-Pint" by Charles and "Beth" by Almanzo
Mary Ingalls	1–8	133	Melissa Sue Anderson	Daughter, eldest child; later Adam's wife and Adam Jr.'s mother
Carrie Ingalls	1–8	164	Lindsay and Sidney Greenbush	Daughter, youngest child at the beginning of the series
Charles Ingalls Jr.	1	2	Unknown	Son, died as an infant
Grace Ingalls	5–8	60	Wendi and Brenda Turnbaugh	Daughter, youngest child
Albert (Quinn) Ingalls	5–9	89	Matthew Labyorteaux	Son, adopted after spending many years in orphanages and on the streets
Jack				The dog of the family
James (Cooper) Ingalls	7–8	21	Jason Bateman	Son, adopted after birth parents were killed in a wagon accident
Cassandra (Cooper) Ingalls	7–8	21	Missy Francis	Daughter, adopted after birth parents were killed in a wagon accident
Rose Wilder	8–9	17	Sarah and Jennifer Coleman	Granddaughter, daughter of Laura and Almanzo
Bandit				The dog of the family

==== The in-laws ====
Name	Seasons	No. of episodes	Portrayer	Character summary
Almanzo Wilder	6–9	65	Dean Butler	Farmer; Laura's husband (season 7); Rose's father; his friends called him Manly.
Jenny Wilder	9	18	Shannen Doherty	Almanzo's niece, whom he gets custody of after his brother/her father Royal dies
Eliza Jane Wilder	6–8	14	Lucy Lee Flippin	Teacher; Almanzo's older sister
Perley Day Wilder	6	1	Charles Bloom	Almanzo and Eliza Jane's youngest brother; gambler
Adam Kendall	4–8	35	Linwood Boomer	Teacher/Lawyer; Mary's husband (season 5)

=== Townsfolk ===
Name	Seasons	No. of episodes	Portrayer	Character summary
Nels Oleson	1–9	147	Richard Bull	Mercantile proprietor; husband and father
Harriet Oleson	1–9	153	Katherine MacGregor	Mercantile proprietor; wife and mother
Nellie Oleson	1–7, 9	104	Alison Arngrim	Oldest child of Nels and Harriet
Willie Oleson	1–9	140	Jonathan Gilbert	Son of Nels and Harriet
Nancy Oleson	8–9	33	Allison Balson	Daughter of Nels and Harriet, adopted from orphanage
Percival Dalton/Isaac Cohen	6–7	11	Steve Tracy	Nellie's husband
Rachel Brown Oleson	9	2	Sherri Stoner	Willie's wife
Dr. Hiram Baker	1–9	113	Kevin Hagen	Town physician
Reverend Robert Alden	1–9	76	Dabbs Greer	Church minister
Melinda Foster	1–9	61	Ruth Foster	Post office manager
Isaiah Edwards	1–3, 6, 8–9	52	Victor French	Charles's best friend
Grace Snider Edwards	1–3, 6, 8	23	Bonnie Bartlett / Corinne Camacho	Wife of Isaiah Edwards
John Sanderson Edwards	2–4	8	Radames Pera	Oldest child of Isaiah & Grace Edwards, adopted after first mother died
Alicia Sanderson Edwards	2–3, 6, 8	19	Kyle Richards	Youngest child of Isaiah & Grace Edwards, adopted after first mother died
Carl Sanderson Edwards	2–3, 8	19	Brian Part / David R. Kaufman	Middle child of Isaiah & Grace Edwards, adopted after first mother died
Matthew Rogers	9	5	Jonathan Hall Kovacs	Young boy that is taken care of by Isaiah Edwards (season 9)
Jonathan Garvey	4–7	51	Merlin Olsen	Farmer; husband and father
Alice Garvey	4–6	33	Hersha Parady	Wife and mother; teacher; dies in fire with Adam Kendall Jr.
Andy Garvey	4–7	43	Patrick Labyorteaux	Son of Jonathan and Alice
Eva Beadle Simms	1–4	45	Charlotte Stewart	School teacher
Adam Simms	4	2	Joshua Bryant	Miss Beadle's husband
Lars Hanson	1–5	41	Karl Swenson	Lumber mill owner; a founder of Walnut Grove
Hester-Sue Terhune	5–9	40	Ketty Lester	Head of the school for the blind
John Carter	9	19	Stan Ivar	Blacksmith; husband and father
Sarah Carter	9	15	Pamela Roylance	Starts a newspaper; wife and mother
Jeb Carter	9	18	Lindsay Kennedy	Older son of John and Sarah
Jason Carter	9	18	David Friedman	Younger son of John and Sarah
Susan Goodspeed	4–7	16	Michelle Downey	Student at the school for the blind
Etta Plum	9	15	Leslie Landon	School teacher
Christy Kennedy	1–2	10	Tracie Savage	Schoolgirl
Sandy Kennedy	1	4	Robert Hoffman	Schoolboy; Christy's brother
Hans Dorfler	1–4, 6	9	James Jeter	Resident of Walnut Grove; a stable-owner
Bill Anderson	6–9	6	Sam Edwards	Banker of Walnut Grove
Joe Kagan	4–5, 7	5	Moses Gunn	Aging boxer who retires to farm life in Walnut Grove
Judd Larrabee	4–5	5	Don "Red" Barry	Resident of Walnut Grove
Mrs. Amanda "May" Whipple	1–4	5	Queenie Smith	Resident of Walnut Grove; local seamstress
Mr. Kennedy	1	4	Wayne Heffley	Resident of Walnut Grove; father of Christy and Sandy
Mrs. Kennedy	1–2	3	Eileen Ryan (season 1), Janice Carroll (season 2)	Resident of Walnut Grove; mother of Christy and Sandy
Ebenezer Sprague	2–3	4	Ted Gehring	Banker of Walnut Grove
Houston Lamb	6–7	4	Dub Taylor	Works and lives at the school for the blind in Sleepy Eye
Henry Riley	4–9	15	Dan McBride	recurring role - customer in Nellie's Restaurant arguing
Kezia Horn	4–5	3	Hermione Baddeley	Resident of Walnut Grove and friend of Laura and Albert
Johnny Johnson	1	2	Mitch Vogel	Schoolboy love interest of Laura

=== One-shot characters ===
==== Season one ====
- Episode 6
  - Miss Amy Hearn (played by Josephine Hutchinson)
- Episode 7
  - Olga Nordstrom (played by Kim Richards)
- Episode 9
  - Abel Makay (played by Dirk Blocker)
- Episode 11
  - Tinker Jones (played by Chuck McCann)
- Episode 14
  - Jonathan (played by Ernest Borgnine)
- Episode 17
  - Kate Thorvald (played by Anne Archer)
- Episode 19
  - Willie O'Hara (played by Red Buttons)
- Episode 20
  - Graham Stewart (played by Johnny Lee)
  - John Stewart (played by Harris Yulin)
- Episode 21
  - Trudy Coulter (played by Julie Cobb)
  - Joseph Coulter (played by Alan Fudge)
- Episode 22
  - Jack Lame Horse (played by Robert Tessier)
  - Marshal Anders (played by Jack Ging)
- Episode 23
  - Hiram Johnson (played by Hal Bokar)
  - Mimi (played by Jane Alice Brandon)
- Episode 24
  - Jim Tyler (played by Forrest Tucker)
  - Helen Tyler (played by Ann Doran)

==== Season two ====
- Episode 4
  - Jebediah Mumfort (played by Karl Lukas)
  - Margaret Mumfort (played by June Dayton)
  - Slick McBurney (played by Gregory Walcott)
- Episode 5
  - Amos Pike (played by John Anderson)
- Episode 7
  - Julia Sanderson (played by Patricia Neal)
- Episode 10
  - Jonah (played by Shane Sinutko)
- Episode 17
  - Hannibal Applewood (played by Richard Basehart)
- Episode 18
  - Henry Hill (played by Louis Gossett Jr)
- Episode 19
  - Elizabeth Thurman (played by Mariette Hartley)
- Episode 20
  - Yuli Pyatakov (played by Theodore Bikel)
  - Viktor Pyatakov (played by Ike Eisenmann)
  - Fanya Pyatakov (played by Lisa Pera)
- Episode 21
  - Granville Whipple (played by Richard Mulligan)

==== Season three ====
- Episode 1
  - Caleb Hodgekiss (played by Johnny Cash)
  - Mattie Hodgekiss (played by June Carter Cash)
- Episode 4
  - Wendell Loudy (played by John Ireland)
- Episode 6
  - Young Charles Ingalls (played by Matthew Labyorteaux)
  - Lansford Ingalls (played by Arthur Hill)
  - Laura Colby Ingalls (played by Jan Sterling)
  - Eliza Ann Ingalls (played by Hersha Parady)
  - Peter Ingalls (played by Mark Lenard)
- Episode 9
  - Bubba Galinder (played by Michael LeClair)
  - George Galinder (played by Roy Jenson)
  - Sam Galinder (played by Geoffrey Lewis)
- Episode 10
  - Sam Shelby (played by Burl Ives)
  - Ben Shelby (played by Johnny Crawford)
- Episode 14
  - Ginny Clark (played by Rachel Longaker)
  - Harold Mayfield (played by Warren Vanders)
  - Della Clark (played by Kay Peters)
- Episode 15
  - Joseph Spotted Eagle Stokes (played by Caesar Ramirez)
  - Seth (played by Willie Aames)
  - Jeremy Stokes (played by George Murdock)
- Episode 18
  - Solomon Henry (played by Todd Bridges)
  - Mrs. Henry (played by Maidie Norman)
  - Jackson Henry (played by David Downing (actor))
  - Kramer (played by Frederic Downs)
  - Dr. Tane (played by Don Pedro Colley)
- Episode 19
  - Anna Gillberg (played by Katy Kurtzman)
- Episode 20
  - Elmer Dobkins (played by Eric Olson)
  - Sam Dobkins (played by Charles Aidman)
  - Ellen Dobkins (played by Mitzi Hoag)
- Episode 21
  - Zachariah (played by E.J. Andre)
  - Rev. Phillips (played by Larry Golden)
  - Ben Griffin (played by Larry Pennell)

==== Season four ====
- Episode 2
  - Patrick - boy on train (played by Mike Lookinland)
- Episode 3
  - Ellen Taylor (played by Mia Bendixsen)
  - Eloise Taylor (played by Corinne Michaels)
  - Cal Taylor (played by James Wainwright)
- Episode 4
  - Chris Nelson (played by Gil Gerard)
- Episode 6
  - Bailey Farrell (played by Bernard Behrens)
  - Timothy Farrell (played by Johnny Doran)
- Episode 7
  - Stanley Novack (played by Michael Pataki)
  - Beth Novack (played by Collin Wilcox)
  - Jed Haney (played by Eddie Quillan)
  - Dr. Asa T Logan (played by Burr DeBenning)
- Episode 8
  - Mr. Dankworth (played by Dennis Rucker)
  - Mr. Hobbs (played by John Bennett Perry)
  - Bob Ford (played by Tony Marks)
  - Lewis Ford (played by Frank Marth)
- Episode 9
  - Judge Picker (played by Eddie Quillan)
- Episode 14
  - Samantha Higgins (played by Seeley Ann Thumann)
  - Jimmy Hill (played by Chris Petersen)
- Episode 15
  - Nats Rachel Peal (played by Anita Dangler)
  - Caleb Fisher (played by John McLiam)
  - Katie Fisher (played by Linda McMillan)
  - Ellen Fisher (played by Dee Croxton)
- Episode 16
  - Jordan Harrison (played by Ronnie Scribner)
  - Young Caroline (played by Katy Kurtzman)
  - Younger Laura Colby Ingalls (played by Sarah Miller)
  - Mr. Watson (played by Sorrell Booke)
  - Harold Watson (played by Adam Gunn)
  - Peter Ingalls (played by David Considine)
  - Henry Quiner-Holbrook (played by Gregg Forrest)
  - Polly Ingalls (played by Robin Muir)
  - Eliza Ann Quiner-Holbrook (played by Kristi Jill Wood)
  - Lansford Ingalls (played by Nicolas Coster)
  - Charlotte Holbrook (played by Virginia Kiser)
  - Young Charles Ingalls (played by Matthew Labyorteaux)
- Episode 17
  - Bobby Harris (played by Michael Mullins)
  - Anna Mears (played by Lenora May)
  - Shaniel Mears (played by Donald Moffat)
  - Rev. Pritchard (played by Woodrow Parfrey)
- Episode 21
  - Dr. Burke (played by Ford Rainey)
  - Miseth Barton (played by Rob Kenneally)

==== Season five ====
- Episode 4
  - John Bevins (played by Cliff Emmich)
  - Bess Bevins (played by Kate Woodville)
  - Amelia Bevins (played by Julie Ann Haddock)
- Episode 8
  - Erich Schiller (played by Ike Eisenmann)
  - Otto Schiller (played by King Moody)
  - Anna Schiller (played by Lisa Pera)
- Episode 15
  - Isaac Singerman (played by John Bleifer)
  - Aaron Singerman (played by Alvin Kupperman)
- Episode 18
  - Miss Elliot (played by Ellen Regan)
  - Holly (played by Martha Nix)
  - Giles Kendall (played by Philip Abbott)
- Episode 20
  - Adele Larrabee (played by Joan Tompkins—wife of Karl Swenson)
- Episode 22
  - Leslie Harper (played by Jenny Sullivan)
  - Samantha Harper (played by Kyle Richards)
  - Bret Harper (played by Charles Cioffi)
  - Thomas Harper (played by Bobby Rolofson)
- Episode 24
  - Dylan Whitaker (played by Steve Shaw)

==== Season six ====
- Episode 3
  - Jeremy Quinn (played by Michael Pataki)
- Episode 6
  - Russell Harmon (played by William Schallert)
  - Anna Craig Alden (played by Iris Korn)
- Episode 9
  - Milo Stavroupolis (played by Leo Gordon)
  - Anna Stavroupolis (played by Nora Meerbaum)
- Episode 10
  - Rev. Danforth (played by James Olson)
- Episode 12
  - Harold (played by Royal Dano)
- Episode 13
  - Tod Dortmunder (played by Timothy Wead)
  - Brewster Davenport (played by Malcolm Atterbury)
  - Virginia Davenport (played by Susan French)
- Episode 20
  - Penelope Parker (played by Stacey Sipes)
- Episode 21
  - Molly Reardon (played by Suzanne Rogers)
- Episode 22
  - Miss Trimble (played by Lucille Benson)

==== Season seven ====
- Episode 1
  - Harv Miller (played by James Cromwell)
- Episode 4
  - Dan Ellerbee (played by James Jarnagin)
  - Pete Ellerbee (played by William Traylor)
- Episode 6
  - Annie Crane (played by Madeleine Stowe)
- Episode 7
  - Brenda Sue Longworth (played by Tisch Raye)
- Episode 8
  - Leslie Barton (played by Suzy Gilstrap)
- Episode 9
  - Kavendish (played by Eddie Quillan)
- Episode 13
  - Benjamin Cohen (played by E.M. Margolese)
  - Edna Cohen (played by Bea Silvern)
- Episode 15
  - Hertzell Lundy (played by Mel Stewart)
  - Timothy (played by Keith Mitchell)
- Episode 17 & 18 (two-part episode)
  - Sylvia Webb (played by Olivia Barash)
  - Hector Webb (played by Royal Dano)
  - Irv Hartwig (played by Richard Jaeckel)
- Episode 19
  - Edgar Mills (played by Jeff Corey)
  - Edna Mills (played by Barbara Collentine—wife of Richard Bull)
- Episode 21
  - Mr Case (played by Ivan Bonar)
  - Jed Cooper (played by EJ Andre)
  - Sarah Cooper (played by M.E. Loree)
  - Alvin Cooper (played by George McDaniel)
- Episode 22
  - Isaiah Tomkins (played by Len Wayland)

==== Season eight ====
- Episode 1
  - Miss Mason (played by Elizabeth Hoffman)
- Episode 4
  - Dr. Caleb Ledoux (played by Don Marshall)
  - Mattie Ledoux (played by Marlene Warfield)
- Episode 5
  - Mortimer Carstairs (played by Patrick Collins)
  - Ralph Waldo Emerson (played by George Petrie)
- Episode 6
  - Amy Cassidy (played by Martha Nix)
  - Rodolfo Gambini (played by Jack Kruschen)
  - Ana Rosa Gambini (played by Gloria Manos)
  - Marco Gambini (played by Stephen Manley)
  - Stefano Gambini (played by Robert Torti)
- Episode 7
  - Max (played by Todd Susman)
  - Georgie (played by Royce D. Applegate)
- Episode 8
  - Callahan (played by M. Emmet Walsh)
- Episode 9
  - Elmer Miles (played by J.Brennan Smith)
- Episode 10
  - Major Guffey (played by Laurie Main)
- Episode 12
  - Gideon Hale (played by Peter Billingsley)
  - Braden Hale (played by Dennis Howard)
  - Mrs. Hale (played by Jennifer Rhodes)
- Episode 14
  - Jack Prescott (played by Claude Earl Jones)
- Episode 16
  - Sam Terhune (played by J.A. Preston)
  - Naomi Terhune (played by Marguerite DeLain)
- Episode 20
  - Sherman Andruss (played by Dennis Lipscomb)
  - Helen Andruss (played by Judith Weston)
  - Louisa Beckwith (played by Ruth Silveira)
  - Horace Beckwith (played by Calvin Bartlett)
  - Nora Cramer (played by Betty McGuire)
- Episode 21
  - Danny (played by Georg Olden)
- Episode 22
  - Old Man (played by Don Beddoe)

==== Season nine ====
- Episode 3
  - Lem McCary (played by Lew Ayres)
  - Jess Moffet (played by Charles Lane)
- Episode 4
  - Thomas Stark (played by Robert Loggia)
  - Constance Stark (played by Michele Marsh)
  - Elizabeth Stark (played by Tammy Lauren)
  - Randall Page (played by Ronnie Scribner)
- Episode 5
  - Lou Bates (played by Billy Barty)
  - Mrs. Bates (played by Susan French)
- Episode 10
  - Jane Canfield (played by Jill Schoelen)
- Episode 12
  - Dr. Marvin Haynes (played by Ralph Bellamy)
- Episode 13
  - Linda McAndrews (played by Sheila Larken)
  - Elliott Reed (played by John McLiam)
- Episode 14
  - Cole Younger (played by Geoffrey Lewis)
  - Bart Younger (played by Robert Donner)
  - Lonnie Younger (played by Timothy Scott)
- Episode 16
  - Matthew Rogers (played by Jonathan Hall Kovacs)
- Episode 19
  - Ruthy Leland (played by Vera Miles)
  - Dewey Harrison (played by Eric Christmas)
- Episode 20
  - Buffalo Bill (played by Eddie Quillan)
  - Blanche (played by Strawberry)
- Episode 21
  - Mae Flannery (played by Barbara Townsend)
- Episode 22
  - Philip Rogers (played by Robert Darnell)
  - Sherwood Montague (played by Robert Casper)

==== Post-series movies ====
- Little House: The Last Farewell
  - Nathan Lassiter (played by James Karen)

=== Animals ===
- Dogs: Jack and Bandit
- Horses: Pat and Patty
- Pony: Bunny
- Goat: Fred
- Bull: Fagin
- Raccoon: Jasper
- Cat: Pepper
- Orangutan: Blanche (played by Strawberry)
- Turkey: Tom
- Chicken: Mathilda
- Cow: Gertrude and Spot

== Ingalls' and Wilder's genealogy ==
=== The Ingalls family ===
Charles Ingalls	Caroline Quiner	James Wilder	Angeline Day
Mary Ingalls	Carrie Ingalls	Charles Frederic Ingalls	Grace Ingalls	Laura Wilder	Royal Wilder	Eliza Jane Wilder	Alice Wilder	Perley Wilder
Laura Ingalls	Almanzo Wilder
Rose Wilder	Unnamed son

- Ingalls line :

Henry Ingalls and Joan/Johan Wytton

Robert Ingalls (1563–1617) and Elizabeth ? (1567–1631)

Edmund Ingalls (1598–1648) and Ann Tripp (1599–1648)

Henry Ingalls (1627–1718) and Mary Osgood (1633–1686)

Samuel Ingalls (1654–1733) and Sarah Hendrick (1661–1738)

Samuel Ingalls Jr. (1683–1747) and Mary E. Watts (1687–?)

Timothy Ingalls (1720–1757) and ?

- Delano line :

Jonathan Delano (b.1647) and Mercy Warren (1658–1727) (gdau. of Richard Warren of the Mayflower)

Jonathan Delano (b.1680) and Amy Hatch (b.1687)

Jabez Delano (b.1708) and Prudence Hibbard (b.1711)

- Colby line :

Matthew Colby (b.1530) and (from 1555) Mary (last name unknown) (b.1532)

Thomas Colby (b.1567) and (from May 4, 1596) Anne Jackson (b.1571)

Anthony Colby (b.1605) and (from 1632) Susanna Haddon (b.1608)

John Colby (b.1633) and (from January 14, 1655) Frances Hoyt (b.1636)

John Colby (b.1656) and (from December 27, 1675) Sarah Eldridge (b.1658)

Joseph Colby (b.1680) and (from November 22, 1704) Anne Bartlett (b.1684)

Nathan Colby (b.1710) and (from December 18, 1735) Hannah Worthen (b.1716)

Jonathan Ingalls (1750–1834) & Martha Jane Locke (1753–1785)	Jonathan Delano (1735–1811) & Anne Ladd (1734–1816)	Ezekiel Colby (1739–1791) & Sally Fowler (1734–1834)	Elijah Blood (1748–1826) & Eunice Sleeman (1758–1811)
Samuel Ingalls (1771–1841)	Margaret Delano (1773–1837)	Nathan Colby (1778–1857)	Eunice Blood (1782–1862)
Lansford Ingalls (1812–1896)	Laura Colby (1810–1883)
Peter Ingalls (1833–1900)	Aaron Ingalls (1835–1835)	Charles Ingalls (1836–1902)	Lydia Ingalls (1838–1913)	Polly Ingalls (1840–1886)	Lansford Ingalls (1842–1928)	Laura Ingalls (1845–1918)	Hiram Ingalls (1848–1923)	George Ingalls (1851–1901)	Ruby Ingalls (1855–1881)

Based on the data from : The Genealogy of Almanzo and Laura Ingalls Wilder

- Peter Riley Ingalls (1833–1900) – born in Cuba, New York. On June 5, 1861, in Brookfield, Wisconsin married Eliza Ann Quiner (see : The Quiners) and they had 6 children (see below). They left Pepin in 1874, together with Laura's family, and stopped in Zumbro Falls, Minnesota. Next they moved to South Troy, Minnesota where the Ingalls visited them for some time (in 1876).
  - Alice Josephine Ingalls (Apr 23, 1862 – January 30, 1934) – married Arthur Whiting. They had five children, born between 1883 and 1899 (Altha Whiting Taylor, Jay Whiting, Fred Whiting, Vena Whiting Clark and Roy Whiting).
  - Ella Estella Ingalls (Jan 23, 1865 – March 9, 1945) – married Leslie Lee Whiting and had four sons, born between 1885 and 1894 (Earl Whiting, Floyd Whiting, Harry Whiting and Clarence Whiting). She spent some time in DeSmet, with her husband and the eldest baby Earl Leland.
  - Peter Franklin Ingalls (Nov 16, 1866 – September 23, 1932) – lived with Laura and Almanzo in De Smet for a while. Married Mary Edith "Molly" McGowin and they had between seven and eight children (presumed to be Edith Ingalls, Alexander Ingalls, Florence Ingalls Lindsey, Pearlie Ingalls Chiles, Fred Ingalls, Mary Ingalls, Mable Ingalls Mims and an unnamed infant)
  - Lansford Newcomb Ingalls (April 5, 1870 - January 17, 1946)
  - Edith Florence "Dolly Varden" Ingalls (Jun 23, 1872 – July 13, 1951), on June 9, 1892, married Heil Nelson Bingham and they had eight children, born between 1893 and 1912 (Frederick Bingham, Estella Bingham Mahoney, Pearl Bingham Shanahan, Percy Bingham, Mabel Bingham Leverty, Thomas Bingham, Edna Bingham and James Bingham).
  - Edmond Llewellyn Ingalls (b. August 26, 1880), married Edith Mae Ide and they had 6 children. (Lois Ingalls Gibson, Herbert Ingalls, Wallace Ingalls, Margaret Ingalls Cowsar and William Ingalls).
- Aaron Ingalls (1835–1835). Died at approximately two weeks of age, of "convulsions".
- Charles Phillip Ingalls (1836–1902) – Laura's father
  - Mary Amelia Ingalls (1865–1928)
  - Laura Elizabeth Ingalls (1867–1957)
  - Caroline Celestia 'Carrie' Ingalls (1870–1946)
  - Charles Frederick 'Freddie' Ingalls (1875–1876)
  - Grace Pearl Ingalls (1877–1941)
- Lydia Louise Ingalls (1838–1913) – on January 15, 1856, she married Robert Fulton Clough and later – in 1859, Joseph Stouff. She had five children, first of whom was Clough's.
  - Issac Lafayette Clough (1858–1893, got married in 1876)
  - Amos Alvin Stouff (1860–1893)
  - Minnie Stouff (1868–1941)
  - Amy Stouff (1870–1947)
  - Robert Stouff (1875–1926)
- Polly Melona Ingalls (1840–1886) – born in Cuba, New York. In 1859 married Henry Odin Quiner (see : The Quiners) and they had seven children (see below). The family left Pepin with Laura's family in 1868 and both families stopped in Rothville, Missouri. In 1869 they returned to Pepin. Some time later they went West.
  - Louisa Martha Quiner (1860–1917), m. Walter Smith and had at least one son, William Smith
  - Charles Henry Quiner (1862–1881)
  - James Albert Quiner (1865–1947), m. Gertrude Frances Price (1866–1945) in 1903
  - Charlotte A. "Lottie" Quiner (1867–?), m. Charles Sheldon (1857–1942) and had three daughters (May Sheldon Scharen, Grace Sheldon and Blanche Sheldon)
  - George Lansford Quiner (1870–1884)
  - Lillian M. "Lillie" Quiner (1873–1881)
  - Ruby Quiner (1878–1885)
- Lansford James Ingalls (1842–1928) – was married twice; to Sarah Dickinson (1846–1897) and later to Mary Dickinson. Both of them were born in England.
  - Samuel James Ingalls (1866–1933)
  - Sara Belle Ingalls (1870–1856)
  - William Walter Ingalls (1872–1846)
  - Mary Elizabeth Ingalls (1874–1923)
  - Andrew Jackson Ingalls (1876–1959)
  - Charles Reuben Ingalls (1878–1880)
  - Edward Eugene Ingalls (1881–1888)
  - Horace Foster Ingalls (1883–1888)
  - Olive May Ingalls (1885–1888)
  - Martha Esther Ingalls (1887–1977)
- Laura Ladocia "Docia" Ingalls (July 8, 1845 – January 18, 1918) – married August Waldvogel (divorced later) and the couple had two children (see below). Next she married Hiram "Hi" Forbes and they had seven daughters. Hiram was a contractor for the Chicago and North Western Railway. They spent some time in DeSmet with the Ingalls but soon moved to Nebraska. They lost contact. Hiram died in 1906, and Docia subsequently moved to Colorado. She died twelve years later.
  - Lena Evelyn Waldvogel (1866–1943), m. Samuel Aughey Heikes and they had eight children (Agnes Heikes Kate, Eugene Heikes, Marion Heikes Lueder, Samuel Heikes, Lola Heikes Flack, Winfred Heikes, Warren Heikes and Geraldine Heikes Sloan)
  - August Eugene "Jean" Waldvogel (1870-1945), m. first Maria Luella Harmon and subsequently Leona Beatrice Hinton, and had seven children in total (Earl Waldvogel, William Waldvogel, Velma Waldvogel Mellor, Verne Waldvogel, Ernest Waldvogel, Robert Waldvogel and Leonard Waldvogel). Died in a car accident along with Leona, Verne and Leonard.
  - Ida May Forbes (1875–1953), m. Charles W. Norman
  - Adeline Forbes (1877–1936), m. Algernon "Al" Russell
  - Emma Laura Forbes (1879–1912), m. Henry Schneider
  - Mary Amanda Forbes (1881–1958), m. Edward Oscar Baker
  - Maud Marie Forbes (1884–1983), m. Joseph Gregg or John Gunderson
  - Frances I. Forbes (1887–1968), m. Joseph Halda
  - Katie P. Forbes (1890–1919) - possibly married a man with the surname Wilton
- Hiram Lemuel Ingalls (1848–1923) – on October 18, 1867, married Sarah Elizabeth Woodward (1847–1910) and on February 27, 1919 – Ellen Parker
  - Laura Eliza Ingalls (1867–1943), m. John Monroe Butterfield (1856–1943)
  - Ruby Evaline Ingalls (1871–1941), m. Austin Johnson Beers (1852–1929) in 1884 and William E. Garrison (1874–1947) in 1931
  - Phillip L. Ingalls
  - Sarah Jeanette Ingalls (1877–1956), m. Emil Otto Kreiner (1865–1937) and later Bernard Connor (1871–1914) in 1896
  - Mary Rose Ellen Ingalls (1880–1951), m. Marion Ormal Kezer (1875–1942)
  - Hiram LeRoy "Roy" Ingalls (1882–1949), m. Mathilda Bartosh (1883–1966) in 1901
  - Leo Vincent Kreiner Ingalls (1896–1974), m. Viola Edna Edgerton. Adopted by Hiram in 1898.
- George Whiting Ingalls (1851–1901) - married Julia E. Bard (1858–1910) in Alden, Wisconsin, and moved with her to Webster, Wisconsin
  - "baby boy" Ingalls (b. 1878) - died shortly after birth
  - "baby boy" Ingalls (b. 1880) - died shortly after birth
  - Benjamin Ingalls (1884-1885) - suffocated on the way back from a family visit
- Ruby Celestia Ingalls (1855–1881) - married Joseph Card (1849-1923)
  - George Card (?)
  - Sherman Card (?)
  - Alma Josephine "Dolly Varden" Card (1880-1885)

NOTE: A second daughter of Ruby Ingalls Card, Lettie Letishia Card Anderson, is listed as being born in 1888, seven years after Ruby's death. How this is possible is unknown.

=== The Quiner family ===
William Quiner (1773–1831)	Margaret Doer (1774–1839)	Lewis Tucker (1779–1870)	Martha Gráinne Morse (1772–1862)
Henry Quiner (1809–1844)	Charlotte Tucker (1809–1884)	Frederic M. Holbrook (1819-1874)
Martha Quiner (1832–1836)	Joseph Quiner (1834–1862)	Henry Quiner (1835–1880)	Martha Quiner (1837–1927)	Caroline Quiner (1839–1924)	Eliza Quiner (1842–1931)	Thomas Quiner (1844–1903)	Charlotte Holbrook (1854–1939)

(Laura's maternal great-great-grandparents)
Allan Alexander Morse and Margaret Drummond *These are fictional names. Real names unknown.

(Laura's maternal great-grandparents)
Lewis Tucker (1779–1870) and Martha Gráinne Morse (1772–1862)
William Quiner (1773–1831) and Margaret Doer (1774–1839)

(Laura's maternal grandparents)
Charlotte Tucker and Henry Quiner

THEIR CHILDREN (Laura's aunts and uncles) :

- Martha Morse Quiner (1832–1836)
- Joseph Carpenter Quiner (1834–1862). He married Nancy Frank in Wisconsin in 1856. Died of wounds suffered at the Battle of Shiloh.
  - Frank R Quiner (1859–1944)
  - John Carpenter Quiner (1861–1950)
- Henry Odin Quiner (1835–1880) – born on December 7 in Ohio. He married Polly Ingalls (for more – see above)
- Martha Jane Quiner (1837–1927) – married Charles Carpenter in 1860 and had fourteen children.
  - William Augustus Carpenter (1861–1884)
  - Joseph Quiner Carpenter (1863–1923) married Elizabeth C.Reese.
    - Phoebe Carpenter
    - Joseph Carpenter
    - Elizabeth Carpenter
    - Clara Carpenter
    - Martha Carpenter
    - Charles Carpenter
    - Theodore Carpenter
    - Donald Carpenter
    - Lillian Carpenter
    - Emilie Carpenter
  - Lettice "Lottie" Jane Carpenter (1864–1949)
  - Nancy Cora Carpenter (1865–1955)
  - Martha Eliza Carpenter (1868–1871)
  - Millicent Ann Carpenter (1869–1960)
  - Charles Carr Carpenter (1871–1918)
  - Emma Bertha Carpenter (1873–1955)
  - Etta Minerva Carpenter (1874–1899)
  - Martha Josephine Carpenter (1876–1962)
  - Marion Caroline Carpenter (1879–1939)
  - Myrtie Emmeline Carpenter (1879–1956)
  - Thomas Quiner Carpenter (1882–1944)
  - George Lockwood Carpenter (1882–1954)
- Caroline Lake Quiner (December 12, 1839 – April 20, 1924) – Laura's mother
- Eliza Ann Quiner (1842–1931) – born on April 21 in Brookfield, Wisconsin. Both families – the Ingalls and the Quiners – moved several times and stopped finally in Jefferson County, Wisconsin. Eliza married Peter Ingalls in Concord, Wisconsin, on June 5, 1861 (for more – see above).
- Thomas Lewis Quiner (1844–1903) – born on November 23. He married Lillian Graham 'Lily' Hill (1858-1924) and they had six children. They lived for some time in DeSmet. Died in an accident at the Columbia River on February 23, 1903.
  - Helen Marion Quiner (1881–1961)
  - Alice Quiner (1882–1883)
  - Donald Quiner (1885–1887)
  - Lillian Josephine Quiner (1887–1959)
  - Dugald Lewis Quiner (1889–1964)
  - John Hill Quiner (1900–1978)

Henry Quiner died in October 1844 in the sinking of a trading ship on the Great Lakes. Charlotte Tucker Quiner remarried, to Frederic Holbrook, and they had one child

- Charlotte Elizabeth "Lottie" Holbrook (January 20, 1854 – February 15, 1939). She married Henry Moore (b. 1852) in 1875 and they had five children.
  - Frederick Moore (b. 1878)
  - Arvin Moore (b. 1880)
  - Harry C. Moore (b. 1882)
  - Ralph Moore (b. 1887)
  - Pearl Eva Moore (b. 1888)

==== Charlotte Tucker ====
Lewis Tucker	Martha Morse (1782–1862)
Betsy Tucker (1800–?)	Lewis Tucker (1802–?)	Linus Tucker (1802–?)	Lydia Tucker (1805–?)	Thomas Tucker (1807–?)	Charlotte Tucker (1809–1884)	Caroline Tucker (1811–?)	Mary Tucker (1813–?)	Nancy Tucker (1816–?)	George Tucker(1820–1821)

Charlotte Wallis Tucker was born on May 25, 1809, in Roxbury, Massachusetts (a suburb of Boston). She died September 20, 1884, in Rome, Wisconsin. Her mostly fictionalised story was described in the four-book series The Charlotte Years by Melissa Wiley. Charlotte was maternal grandmother to Laura Ingalls Wilder.

As a young woman, Charlotte married Henry Newton Quiner from Connecticut. She was the first woman in her family to travel west, living in Ohio and Indiana before settling in the frontier town of Brookfield, Wisconsin.

==== Martha Morse ====
Allan Alexander Morse	Margaret Drummond
Grisell "Grisie" Morse (b. 1774)	Alisdair Morse (b.1776)	Robert "Robbie" Morse (b.1778)	Duncan Morse (b.1780)	Martha Morse (1782–1862)

Martha Morse was born on January 2, 1782, in Scotland, where her father was a wealthy landowners in the Scottish Highlands. Her mostly fictionalised story was told in the four-book series The Martha Years, by Melissa Wiley. Martha was Charlotte Tucker's mother and great-grandmother to Laura Ingalls Wilder.

Martha married Lewis Tucker, a blacksmith's son. Lewis and Martha travelled to the United States and began their new life near Boston, Massachusetts, becoming the first of Laura's ancestors to immigrate to America.

=== The Wilder family ===
Daniel Wilder (1764–1851)	Mary Polly Gould (1765–1828)	Thomas Payne	Sarah Stewart Mason
Abel Wilder (1784–1849)	Hannah Payne (1790–1842)
Royal Gould Wilder (1809–1815)	Thomas Payne Wilder (1811–?)	James Mason Wilder (1813-1899)	Hannah Payne Wilder (1814–1891)	Royal Gould Wilder (1816–1887)	Phoebe Wilder (1821–1890)	Polly Maria Wilder (1824–1851)	William Wilder (1828–1909)	Sarah Charlotte Wilder (1820–1892)	Joshua Prince Wilder (1832–1832)

- Royal Gould Wilder (1809–1815)
- Thomas Payne Wilder (1811–?)
- James Mason Wilder (1813-1899) – Almanzo's father. Married Angeline Albina Day.
  - Laura Ann Wilder (1844–1899) – born June 15, 1844, in 1874 married Harrison Lomanzo Howard.
    - Kearny Howard (step-child, born c.1869)
    - Angelina Esther Howard (1876–1964), in 1897 married Fred Merritt.
      - Ralph Merritt
      - Ethel Merritt
      - Howard Merritt
    - Harrison J.Howard (1878–1918)
    - Josephine Howard (1880–1918), married to William Walker
    - Ralph Waldo Howard (1881–1934), married to Estelle C.
      - Charles E. Howard (1908–1978)
      - Clarence Howard (1909–1913)
      - James J. Howard (1911–1981)
      - Ralph R. Howard (1913–1921)
      - Ralph Waldo Howard (1914–1976)
      - Paul Martin Howard (1920–1923)
  - Royal Gould Wilder (1847–1925), born February 20, 1847. In 1893, married Electa Averill Hutchison.
    - Ethel Hutchinson (step-child, died 1905), married Willard Stevens (died in 1928)
    - Clyde Hutchinson (step-child), married Edna Baily
    - Rae Hutchinson (step-child), married Bertha Luedtke (died 1910)
    - Mae Hutchinson (step-child), in 1912 married George Pooler
    - Angeline Bernice Wilder (1894–1957), in 1917 married Arlow Laging and in 1929, George Granger.
    - "baby girl" Wilder (stillborn in 1897)
    - Susan E. Wilder (1898–1899)
  - Eliza Jane Wilder (1850–1930), born January 3, 1850. In 1893, married Thomas Jefferson Thayer and in 1904, Maxwell Gordon. Died in Los Angeles.
    - Walcott Wilder Thayer (1894–1965), in 1918 married Frances Cockrell.
      - Walter Thayer – married Elaine Ditch
        - Cynthia Thayer
        - Walter Thayer
      - Francis Gervaise Thayer – married Alena Jobe.
        - Thomas Thayer
        - Larry Thayer
      - Betty Mae Thayer – married a man with the surname Raymond, and later, married a man with the surname Huey.
        - Cynthia Raymond
        - Walter Raymond
        - David Huey
        - Joan Huey
        - Donald Huey
  - Alice Maria Wilder (1853–1892), born September 3, 1853. In 1879 married Albert A.Baldwin (1848–1905). Died in Florida.
    - Myrtle Baldwin (1880–1945), married to John R. Brown
    - Leland Edward Baldwin (1884–1913)
  - Almanzo Wilder (1857–1949)
  - Perley Day Wilder (1869–1934), born June 13, 1869, In 1897 married Elsie Lillian Merritt (1879–1948). Died in Los Angeles.
    - James Wilder (1903–1990), married Thelma Gricourt
    - Gladys Wilder (1905–1987)
    - Harold O. Wilder (1909–2003)
    - Perley Wilder Jr., (1912–1977), married to Ethel Smith, and later, Dolores Moore
    - Dorothy A. Wilder (1914–1966). Married to Carl Pittman
    - John Wilder (1916–1916)
- Hannah Payne Wilder (1814–1891)
- Royal Gould Wilder (1816–1887) – born after his eldest brother's death (and so named after him). He became a reverend and married Eliza Jane Smith (1822–1910).
  - Edward Payson Wilder (1847–1890)
  - Mary Jane Wilder (b.1856)
  - William Royal Wilder (1858–1925)
  - Grace Evelyn Wilder (1861–1911)
  - Robert Parmelee Wilder (1863–1938)
- Phoebe Wilder (1821–1890) – married Joseph C. Lamson.
  - Chester Lamson (1854–1934) – married Catherine McDonough.
    - Mabel Lamson (1888–1982)
  - Charles Lamson
  - Gussie Lamson
  - "baby girl" Lamson
- Polly Maria Wilder (1824–1851)
- William Wilder (1828–1909) - married Adeline Hastins (1831-1909)
  - William A. "Willie" Wilder (1847–1860)
  - George Wilder (1868–1922)
- Sarah Charlotte Wilder (1820–1892) – married Andrew Day (her sister-in-law's – Almanzo's mother – brother)
  - Carrie May Day (1856–1898) – married Orville Everett.
    - Frances Everett – married a man with the last name of Smith.
      - Dorothy Belle Smith
  - Elmer A.Day (1862–1947) – married to Mary MacMaster (1864–1945)
  - Willard R.Day (1858–1891) – married Emma Hubbard
  - Grace Day (1864–1894) – married to Grant Collins
- Joshua Prince Wilder (1832–1832)

=== The Day family ===
Justin Day, I
Justin Day, II (1790–1861)	Diadema Bateman (1794–1868)
Laura Day (1819–?)	Delia Day (1824–?)	Angelina Albina Day (1819-1905)	Celinda A.Day (1826–?)	Andrew Day (1828–1894)	John Wesley Day (1829–1907)	George W.Day (1821–1872)

- Laura Day (1819–?)
- Delia Day (1824–?)
- Angelina Albina Day (1819–1905) – married James Mason Wilder and they had six children, including Almanzo James Wilder (Laura Ingalls Wilder's husband). For more information, see above.
- Celinda A.Day (1826–?)
- Andrew J. Day (1828–1894) – married Sarah Charlotte Wilder (1820–1892) and they had four children. For more information, see the Wilders' tree above (since Sarah was a sister of Almanzo's father).
- John Wesley Day (1829–1907) – married Alcesta Lindy.
  - Fred Day
  - Frank Day
  - Albert Day
  - Wilton Day
- George W.Day (1831–1873)

== Neighbors, friends and acquaintances ==
=== Real people ===
- Robert and Ellie Boast were neighbors and friends of the Ingalls family.
- Reverend Edward Brown was the reverend and Ingalls's neighbour in De Smet, South Dakota
- Ida Wright-Brown was the Reverend's adopted daughter, and Laura's school friend in De Smet
- Oscar Edmund "Cap" Garland was one of Laura's male school friends. He saved the town from starvation by going 15 miles to find wheat in a blizzard, along with Almanzo Wilder.
- Florence Adelia Garland Dawley was Cap Garland's older sister and a teacher in De Smet.
- Mary Power was Laura's friend in De Smet
- Neta Seal was a real-life close friend of grown-up Laura in Mansfield, Missouri
- Dr. George Tann was the Indians' doctor in Kansas during the Ingalls' stay there

=== Characters based on real people ===
- Lew Brewster was a pseudonym for Louis Bouchie, a homesteader who offered Laura her first teaching job.
- Mr. Edwards, Ingalls' fictional friend
- The Kennedy Family were the Ingalls' neighbors in Walnut Grove, Minnesota; their children went to school with Mary and Laura
- Nellie Oleson was actually three real people: Nellie Owens, Genevieve Masters, and Stella Gilbert.
- Soldat du Chene, was a fictional Osage chief in Kansas during the Ingalls' stay there
