= Allison Stone =

Allison Stone or Alison Stone may refer to:

- Allison, Stone, an unincorporated community in Stone County, Arkansas
- Allison & Stone, an American musical duo
- Alison Stone (philosopher), British philosopher
- Alison Stone (poet), American poet
- Allison Stone, a character in 2014 film Into the Storm
