= Samantha Harper =

Samantha Harper may refer to:

- Samantha Harper, see List of Little House on the Prairie characters
- Samantha Harper, character in Abandon (film)
- Samantha Harper (actress) in Neil Simon's I Ought to Be in Pictures (film)
