= John Peverall =

British film director and producer (1931–2009)

John Peverall (1931 – 3 October 2009) was a British film producer and director. He has served as a producer on films such as The Man Who Fell to Earth and The Deer Hunter and television programmes such as Arthur of the Britons and The Far Pavilions.

In 1979, he won an Oscar at the 51st Academy Awards for Best Picture as one of the producers of The Deer Hunter alongside Barry Spikings, Michael Deeley, and the film's director Michael Cimino.

He was married to Little House on the Prairie actress Hersha Parady.
