= Tedra =

Tedra is a given name. People with the name include:

- Tedra Cobb, a candidate in the 2020 United States House of Representatives election in New York

Fictional characters

- Tedra Rosen, a character in the 1986 film Hyper Sapien: People from Another Star played by Talia Shire
- Tedra, a character in the 2021 play Fat Ham
