= Little House on the Prairie (film) =

1974 film

- Genre: Western; drama
- Based on: Little House on the Prairie by Laura Ingalls Wilder
- Written by: Blanche Hanalis
- Directed by: Michael Landon
- Starring: Melissa Gilbert; Michael Landon; Karen Grassle; Melissa Sue Anderson; Lindsay and Sidney Greenbush; Victor French
- Narrated by: Melissa Gilbert
- Theme music composer: David Rose
- Country of origin: United States
- Original language: English

Production
- Executive producers: Ed Friendly; Michael Landon
- Production locations: Baker Ranch, Tuolumne, California; Cedar Glen Apple Ranch, Yankee Hill, California; Orvis Ranch, Farmington, California; Agoura, California; Melones, Tuolumne, California; Strawberry, Tuolumne, California
- Cinematography: Ted Voigtlander
- Editor: John Loeffler
- Running time: 96 minutes
- Production companies: NBC Productions; Ed Friendly Productions

Original release
- Network: NBC
- Release: March 30, 1974

Related
- Little House on the Prairie (TV series)

Little House on the Prairie is a 1974 American television film which served as the backdoor pilot to the NBC television series of the same name. The film premiered on NBC on March 30, 1974. It is closely based on the novel of the same title, the second of the Little House book series by Laura Ingalls Wilder. The film was produced by Ed Friendly, written by Blanche Hanalis, and directed by Michael Landon.

== Plot ==
The Ingalls family leaves their little house in the Big Woods to head west. After a long and adventurous journey, they stop in Indian Country. Charles builds a house and starts farming, Indians visit them, and they meet Mr. Edwards. After a year, soldiers come and tell the family they have to leave. Packing everything they own, they set off on a new journey.

== Cast ==
- Melissa Gilbert as Laura Ingalls
- Michael Landon as Charles Ingalls
- Karen Grassle as Caroline Ingalls
- Melissa Sue Anderson as Mary Ingalls
- Lindsay and Sidney Greenbush as Carrie Ingalls
- Victor French as Isaiah Edwards
- Victor Mohica as Soldat Du Chêne
- Cal Bellini as Brave
- Sam Vlahos as 1st Indian
- Richard Alarian as 2nd Indian
- Marian Beeler as Charlotte Holbrook
- John Steadman as Frederick Holbrook
- Ruth Foster as Aunt Ruby (uncredited)

== Background and production ==
=== Development ===
Following the cancellation of Bonanza, NBC signed Michael Landon to a contract in which Landon would develop future television series and films. In the wake of more adult oriented theatrical films, Landon sought to produce family-oriented entertainment with traditional values. Former network vice-president and producer Ed Friendly had obtained the television rights to the Laura Ingalls Wilder Little House series, but he was not having success shopping the idea to Hollywood. When Landon and Friendly connected about the project, Friendly saw Landon as a potential actor for Charles Ingalls, and Landon saw it as an opportunity to produce something that promoted family values.

NBC was not initially enthusiastic about the idea, seeing it as potentially dull. However, the network's executives had faith in Landon and financed the two-hour pilot movie, with the potential for a series if the film was successful.

=== Casting ===
Landon put considerable effort into casting the central characters of the story. Forty-seven actresses auditioned for the role of Caroline, before Landon settled on Karen Grassle, who he thought "looked like a pioneer woman".

For the roles of the children, Landon did not want "professional daughters with stage mothers".

=== Filming ===
Filming occurred in early 1974 near Stockton, California.

== Broadcast ==
The film was first broadcast March 30, 1974.

== Bibliography ==
- Butler, Dean (June 25, 2024). Prairie Man: My Little House Life & Beyond. Citadel Press. ISBN 978-0-8065-4331-4.
- Daly, Marsha (1987). Michael Landon: A Biography. New York: St. Martin's Press. ISBN 0-312-01068-0.
- Fellman, Anita Clair (May 21, 2008). Little House, Long Shadow: Laura Ingalls Wilder's Impact on American Culture. University of Missouri Press. ISBN 978-0-8262-6633-0.
- Terrace, Vincent (1985). Encyclopedia of Television Series, Pilots and Specials. VNR AG. ISBN 978-0-918432-61-2.
- Yoggy, Gary A. (October 16, 2024). Riding the Video Range: The Rise and Fall of the Western on Television. McFarland. ISBN 978-1-4766-2224-8.
