= Lucy Lee Flippin =

American film and television actress

- Occupation: Actress
- Years active: 1971–2008
- Spouse: Thomas Francis Tarpey (m. 1975)

Lucy Lee Flippin is an American retired actress.

== Education and early life ==
Flippin is the daughter of Dr. and Mrs. Harrison Fitzgerald Flippin. She was raised in Douglassville, Pennsylvania. She attended Northwestern University and spent a year performing with Holiday on Ice before pursuing a career in acting. Later she studied acting under Uta Hagen. Her attempt to work in Hollywood was rebuffed when an executive at Warner Bros. told her that she would not succeed as an actress because she was not pretty enough and was too tall. She returned to New York and worked there for 10 years.

== Career ==
She initially began her career in New York City where she eventually got several TV commercials and off-Broadway theatre work, most notably opposite Richard Gere in a Lincoln Center production of A Midsummer Night's Dream. At the advice of her agent, she relocated to Los Angeles where she would get roles in television series and films.

She played Eliza Jane Wilder on the TV series Little House on the Prairie. She played Fran Castleberry, the younger sister of Polly Holliday's character on the show Flo. After Little House on the Prairie stopped production, she appeared in many different television shows and movies, and has performed onstage at Geffen Playhouse in Los Angeles. She retired in 2008.

== Personal life ==
Flippin married actor Thomas Francis Tarpey on October 26, 1975, in Douglassville, Pennsylvania.

== Filmography ==
=== Film ===
Year	Title	Role	Notes
1971	The Telephone Book	Obscene Phone Caller Three	
1976	The Front	Nurse	
1977	Slap Shot	Game Show Contestant (uncredited)	
1977	Annie Hall	Waitress at Health Food Restaurant	
1978	The One and Only	Agatha Franklen	
1978	Goin' South	Diane Haber	
1983	Flashdance	Secretary	
1984	Young Lust		
1985	Police Academy 2: Their First Assignment	Mom in Mercedes	
1985	Private Resort	Wanda	
1987	Summer School	Ms. Cura	
1988	Bulletproof	Sister Mary	
1988	Lady in White	Grace La Della	
1988	Hero and the Terror	Media Person	
1988	Earth Girls Are Easy	Receptionist	
1989	My Mom's a Werewolf	Murse Mammosa	
1993	A Perfect World	Lucy	
1995	Mother	Chloe	Video
1996	Ladykiller (Scene of the Crime)	Mrs. Morlock	
1996	Shoot the Moon	Miss Fellman	
1997	Venus Envy	Mary	
1999	Soccer Dog: The Movie	Mrs. Kale	
2001	Rat Race	Feed the Earth Spokeswoman	
2002	The King	Grandma	Short film
2004	Little Black Book	Daughter	
2005	Whigmaleerie	Lili Dubois	
2007	Urban Decay	Wam Lady	
2008	Prairie Fever	Faith	Video

=== Television ===
Year	Title	Role	Notes
1976	The Bob Newhart Show	Darva	Episode: "The Slammer"
1976	The Edge of Night	Miranda Price	
1977	Mary Jane Harper Cried Last Night	Mother in Park	TV movie
1978	Thou Shalt Not Commit Adultery		TV movie
1979	The Ropers	Hilda	Episode: "The Family Planning"
1979	Portrait of a Stripper	Lori	TV movie
1979–1982	Little House on the Prairie	Eliza Jane Wilder	Recurring role
1980–1981	Flo	Fran Castleberry	Main role
1983	Philip Marlowe, Private Eye	Mrs. Yeager	Episode: "The Pencil"
1984	Newhart	Bassett Hound Lady	Episode: "Vermont Today"
1984	Alice	Dotty	Episode: "Space Sharples"
1985	Scarecrow and Mrs. King	Inez Faber	Episode: "A Lovely Little Affair"
1985	Amazing Stories	Librarian	Episode: "Mummy Daddy"
1986	The Last Precinct	Officer Rina Starland	8 episodes
1986	Mr. Belvedere	Wilmadean	Episode: "Halloween"
1986	Moonlighting	Julie	Episode: "It's a Wonderful Job"
1987	Santa Barbara	Martha	Episode: "1.803"
1987	Small Wonder	Cynthia Jennings	Episode: "Bride and Groom"
1988	The Golden Girls	Nancy	Episode: "Grab That Dough"
1988	Small Wonder	Cynthia Jennings	Episode: "When You Hear the Beep"
1989	Small Wonder	Cynthia Jennings	Episode: "Vicki Doolittle"
1989	Full House	Ms. Agbabian	Episode: "Back to School Blues"
1989	Billy Crystal: Midnight Train to Moscow		TV movie
1989	Mr. Belvedere	Doris Putnam	Episode: "A Happy Guy's Christmas"
1990	Adam-12	Woman at Pet Store	Episode: "A Gang of Two"
1990	Return to Green Acres	Flo Dawson	TV movie
1990	The Hogan Family	Ms. Palmer	Episode: "The Play's the Thing"
1990	The Munsters Today	Natasha Jones	Episode: "Kiss Kiss"
1991	Babes	Becky	Episode: "Hello, Dolly"
1991	Eerie, Indiana	Nurse Nancy	Episode "Just Say No Fun"
1996	Beverly Hills, 90210	Library Manager	Episode: "Remember the Alamo"
1999	ER	Woman with roach in ear	Episode: "Responsible Parties"
2000	Charmed	Helen	Episode: "How to Make a Quilt Out of Americans"
2001	Black Scorpion	Female Juror	Episode: "Crime Time"
2001	The Mind of the Married Man		Episode: "The God of Marriage"
2002	Judging Amy	Flo	Episode: "Boston Terriers from France"
2005	Still Standing	Betty	Episode: "Still Not the One"
