= Jonathan Gilbert =

American television and film actor (born 1967)

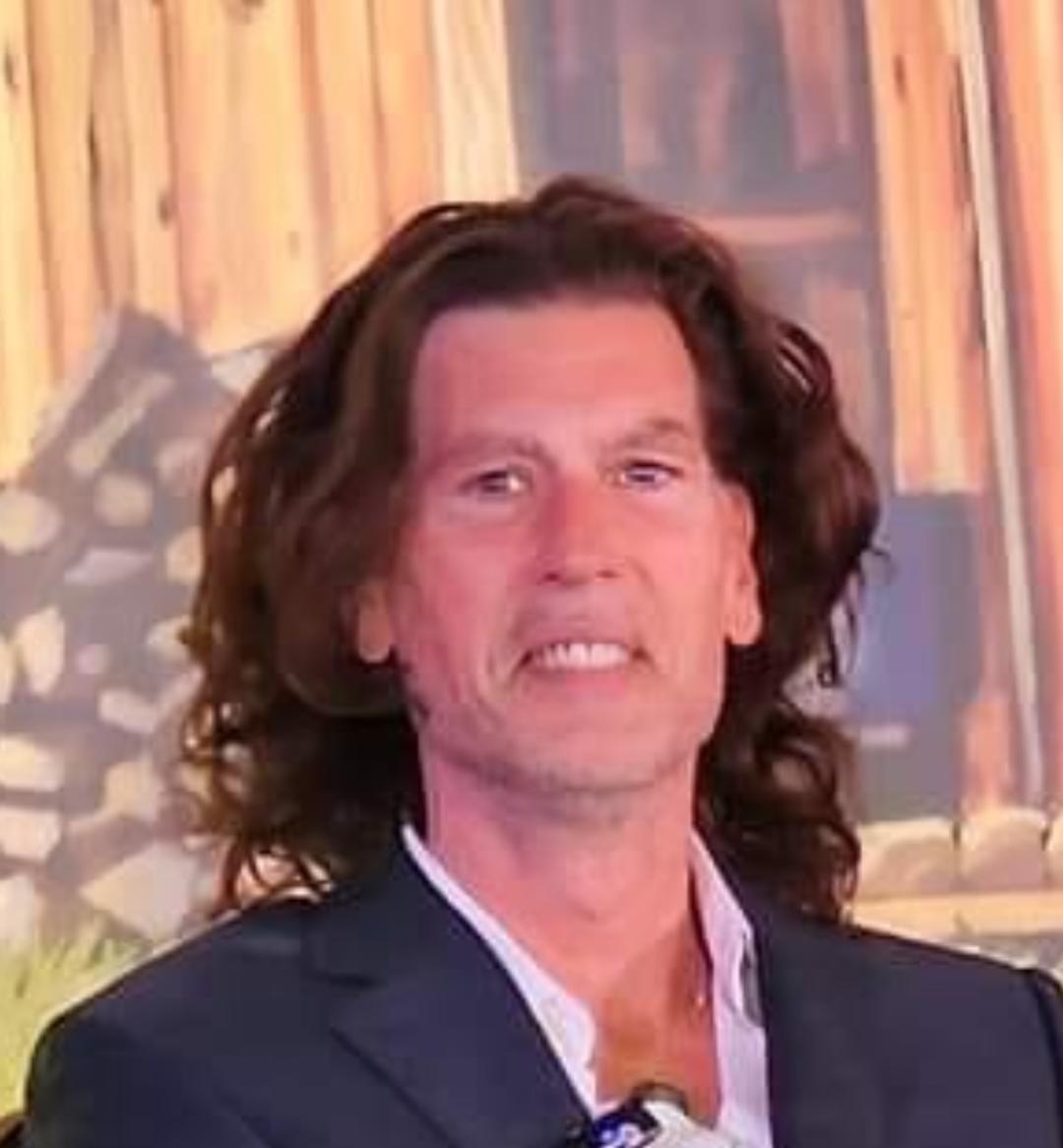
- Born: Jonathan J. Gilbert; April 28, 1967 (age 59); Los Angeles, California, U.S.
- Occupations: Actor; stockbroker
- Years active: 1974–1984 (actor); 1984–present (stockbroker)
- Father: Paul Gilbert
- Relatives: Melissa Gilbert (sister); Sara Gilbert (sister)

Jonathan J. Gilbert (born April 28, 1967) is an American former television and film actor known for his role as Willie Oleson on the TV series Little House on the Prairie.

== Personal life ==
Gilbert was born on April 28, 1967. He is the adopted son of actors Barbara Cowen (née Barbara Crane) and Paul Gilbert and brother of actresses Melissa Gilbert and Sara Gilbert.

In Melissa Gilbert's autobiography, she wrote that Jonathan had moved away from California when he was 18 and she'd had no relationship with him since, for reasons supposedly unknown to her. Her autobiography states that he is a stockbroker living in New York City.

He reunited with his sister Melissa and the cast of Little House for the show's 50th-anniversary reunion in Simi Valley on March 22, 2024.

== Acting career ==
Gilbert is best known for his performance as Willie Oleson on the NBC TV series, Little House on the Prairie, from 1974 to 1983. He is also one of only six actors on Little House on the Prairie to appear throughout the entire series, along with Melissa Gilbert, Richard Bull, Kevin Hagen and Dabbs Greer and Katherine MacGregor. In 1979, Gilbert was in the made for TV movie The Little House Years also as Willie Oleson. Also in 1979, he was in the made-for-TV Movie The Miracle Worker as Jimmy.

He was in two out of the three made-for-TV movies based on the Little House on the Prairie TV series (Little House: Look Back to Yesterday and Little House: The Last Farewell).

== Filmography ==
=== Television ===
Year	Title	Role	Notes
1974–1983	Little House on the Prairie	Willie Oleson	Recurring role
1979	The Little House Years	Willie Oleson	TV movie and archive footage
1979	The Miracle Worker	Jimmy	TV movie
1983	Little House: Look Back to Yesterday	Willie Oleson	TV movie
1984	Little House: The Last Farewell	Willie Oleson	TV movie
