= David Friedman (actor) =

American actor

- Born: June 10, 1973 (age 53); Los Angeles, California, U.S.
- Occupation: Actor
- Years active: 1982—1986

David Friedman (born June 10, 1973) is a former American child actor of the 1980s.

Friedman is known for his role as Jason Carter in the Michael Landon TV series Little House on the Prairie. He retired from Hollywood at the age of 12, went to college in the San Diego area and eventually became a marketing consultant.

== Filmography ==
| Year | Film | Role | Notes |
|---|---|---|---|
| 1982 | A Wedding on Walton's Mountain | John Curtis Willard | TV movie |
| 1982 | Mother's Day on Walton's Mountain | John Curtis Willard | TV movie |
| 1982 | A Day for Thanks on Walton's Mountain | John Curtis Willard | TV movie |
| 1982 | CHiPs | Butchy | Episode: "Ice Cream Man" |
| 1982 | Young Doctors in Love | Young Simon | Feature film |
| 1982 | Missing Children: A Mother's Story | Tom Junior | TV movie |
| 1982–1983 | Little House: A New Beginning | Jason Carter | 18 Episodes; Nominated - Young Artist Award for Best Young Actor in a Drama (1982 & 1983) |
| 1983 | Little House: Look Back to Yesterday | Jason Carter | TV movie |
| 1984 | Little House: The Last Farewell | Jason Carter | TV movie |
| 1984 | Little House: Bless All the Dear Children | Jason Carter | TV movie |
| 1984 | Mama's Family | Little Vint Harper | Episode: "Mama's Birthday"; Nominated - Young Artist Award for Best Young Actor in a Guest in a Television Series |
| 1984 | The Burning Bed | Jimmy (age 10) | TV movie |
| 1985 | The New Leave It to Beaver | Gladiator #1 | Episode: "The Gladiators" |
| 1985 | Highway to Heaven | Kevin | Episode: "Popcorn, Peanuts and CrackerJacks" |
| 1986 | Mr. Belvedere | Dennis | Episode: "Wesley's Friend" |
| 1986 | Amazing Stories | Jonathan (age 12) | Episode: "Gather Ye Acorns" |
| 1986 | St. Elsewhere | Terence O'Casey (age 10) | Episode: "Time Heals: Part 2" |
