= Big Sky Ranch =

Private Ranch in Simi Valley, California

Coordinates: 34°19′7″N 118°43′9″W

Big Sky Ranch is a movie ranch in Simi Valley, California, that is used for the filming of Western television series and motion pictures, among other projects. The Ventura County Cultural Heritage Board designated several of these buildings County Landmark #71 in July 1981. The ranch is within the Los Angeles Studio Zone.

== History ==
The site is part of the 12,500-acre (5,058.57 ha) (19.5 sq.mi.) ranch purchased by the Patterson Ranch Co. in 1903 to raise grain, cattle, hogs and sheep. J. Paul Getty bought the ranch in the 1930s. After purchasing the ranch in 1981, Watt Enterprises named it Big Sky Ranch. Many of the sets were destroyed by a wildfire in 2003.

== Productions ==
Television episodes and productions filmed at Big Sky Ranch include: Rawhide, Gunsmoke, Little House on the Prairie, Highway to Heaven, Father Murphy, Carnivàle, The Thorn Birds, The Yellow Rose, Tales from the Crypt, The Rookie and Westworld.

Films shot at the location include Coming to America (1988), Sidekicks (1974), The Gambler Returns: The Luck of the Draw (1991), Siringo (1996) and Annabelle: Creation (2017), Babylon (2022).
