= Hersha Parady =

American actress (1945–2023)

- Parady in Little House on the Prairie, 1978
- Born: Betty Ann Sandhoff; May 25, 1945; Berea, Ohio, U.S.
- Died: August 23, 2023 (aged 78); Norfolk, Virginia, U.S.
- Occupation: Actress
- Years active: 1959–2015
- Spouse: John Peverall
- Children: 1

Hersha Parady (born Betty Ann Sandhoff; May 25, 1945 – August 23, 2023) was an American actress, best known for her role of Alice Garvey in Little House on the Prairie.

== Early years ==
The daughter of Mr. and Mrs. K. C. Sandhoff, Parady was born as Betty Sandhoff in Berea, Ohio, and attended Berea High School. She began acting locally at age 14 in Cleveland area theatrical productions. She attended Ohio University and Cleveland State University.

== Career ==
Parady moved west in the early 1970s to further her acting career and landed a role opposite Jon Voight in a touring production of A Streetcar Named Desire.

Parady began her career in television with guest-appearances in Mannix, Bearcats! and The Waltons. Hersha was considered to play Caroline Ingalls in Little House on the Prairie, but lost out to Karen Grassle. Later, in 1976 episode "Journey in the Spring", Parady played Eliza Anne Ingalls, Charles's sister-in-law. Then, in 1977, she was given the role of Alice Garvey in Little House on the Prairie, which she played until 1980 when her character was killed in a fire accidentally set by a boy named Clay and Albert Quinn Ingalls. After Little House on the Prairie, she made only rare appearances in television, including Kenan & Kel.

== Personal life and death ==
Parady was married to Oscar-winning producer John Peverall and had one child with him. She died of complications from a brain tumor in Norfolk, Virginia, on August 23, 2023. She was 78. Her death was announced on Alison Arngrim's Facebook page. Parady is buried in Sunset Memorial Park in North Olmsted, Ohio.

== Filmography ==
Year	Title	Role	Notes
1971	Bearcats!	Carrie	Episode: "Conqueror's Gold"
1972	Mannix	Receptionist	Episode: "Cry Silence"
1975	The Waltons	Victoria Madden	Episode: "The Lie"
1976–1980	Little House on the Prairie	Alice Garvey / Eliza Ingalls	34 episodes
1979	CBS Afternoon Playhouse	Laura Harker	5 episodes
1980	NBC Special Treat		Episode: "The House at 12 Rose Street"
1981	ABC Weekend Specials	Janice Parker	Episode: "Mayday! Mayday!"
1981	The Phoenix	Lynn	Episode: "Pilot"
1984	Raw Courage	Fay Canfield	
1986	Hyper Sapien: People from Another Star	Mrs. McAlpin	
1995	The Break	Mrs. Lufkowitz	
1996	The Babysitter's Seduction	Mrs. Bartrand	
1997–1998	Kenan & Kel	Principal Dimly	3 episodes
