= Steve Tracy =

American film and television actor (1952–1986)

- Tracy in Little House on the Prairie, 1980
- Born: Steven Crumrine; October 3, 1952; Canton, Ohio, U.S.
- Died: November 27, 1986 (aged 34); Tampa, Florida, U.S.
- Occupation: Actor
- Years active: 1977–1986

Steve Tracy (October 3, 1952 – November 27, 1986) was an American film, television and stage actor. Tracy is best known for his role on Little House on the Prairie as Percival Dalton.

== Biography ==
=== Life and education ===
Tracy was born as Steven Crumrine into a Jewish family. He attended Kent State University in Kent, Ohio, and was a student in the Theatre Department at Los Angeles City College in Los Angeles, California, as well as the Harvey Lembeck Comedy Workshop.

=== Career ===
Tracy is best known for his recurring role as Percival Dalton in the television series Little House on the Prairie in the early 1980s.

After the end of the series, Tracy maintained a friendship with his on-screen wife Alison Arngrim (Nellie Oleson). Arngrim and Tracy were very close while filming on the set. During the series, there were rumors that he and Arngrim were having a love affair, but Arngrim says that was untrue. Arngrim has also stated that she was the only one on the set who knew that Tracy was gay.

Tracy appeared in several films and other television programs from 1977 to 1986, including Quincy, M.E., The Jeffersons, and National Lampoon's Class Reunion. Six months before his death, he performed in the theater piece AIDS/US: Portraits in Personal Courage in Los Angeles. The piece featured true stories of having AIDS or losing family members to AIDS, with half the cast being heterosexual, at a time when AIDS still was stereotyped as affecting only gay men. Tracy was the only professional actor in the production, as all other participants were non-actors telling their stories on stage because "they wanted to say something."

=== Death ===
Tracy died of AIDS-related complications on November 27, 1986, after which Arngrim became involved in AIDS activism. His ashes were scattered under the Hollywood Sign in the Hollywood Hills, Los Angeles, under the letter "D".

== Filmography ==
Film and television
Year	Title	Role	Notes
1977	Heavy Equipment	Chester	Feature film
1978	James at 15	Ernie	Episode: "Queen of the Silver Dollar"
1979	Quincy, M.E.	Kid	Episodes: "Walk Softly Through the Night: Part 1 & 2"
1979	Beneath the Valley of the Ultra-Vixens	Rhett	Feature film
1980–1981	Little House on the Prairie	Percival Dalton	Semi-regular role (11 episodes)
1981	Desperate Moves	Andy Steigler	Feature film (aka Steigler and Steigler)
1982	The Jeffersons	Steve	Episode: "Jeffersons Greatest Hits"
1982	National Lampoon's Class Reunion	Milt Friedman	Feature film
1984	Party Games for Adults Only	Steven	Feature film
1986	Say Yes	Clerk	Feature film
1987	Tales from the Darkside	Robber	Episode: "Miss May Dusa", (posthumous release)
