= Alison Stone (poet) =

American poet (born 1964)

- Born: 1964 (age 61–62); Framingham, Massachusetts, United States
- Occupations: Poet, psychotherapist

Alison Stone (born 1964) is an American poet. Stone's work deals with themes of feminism, intergenerational trauma, and misogyny within Jewish culture

== Biography ==
Alison Stone grew up in Framingham, Massachusetts and graduated summa cum laude from Brandeis University with a degree in poetry. During her semester abroad, she independently studied under poet Hugo Williams. Her work is published in nine full-length collections, and also appears in numerous publications including The Paris Review, Poetry, Ploughshares, Barrow Street, and Poet Lore. Two of her printed works are held in the permanent collection of the Poetry Foundation in Chicago, Illinois, and many of her poems appear in the foundation's online collection. She has also been awarded with the Frederick Bock Prize by Poetry and the Madeline Sadin Award by New York Quarterly. Several of poems have been published in many different magazines for people to read and enjoy.

Creator of The Stone Tarot, which contains 78 total images and took 9 years to produce, she is also a painter and a licensed psychotherapist. Her paintings have been exhibited in multiple venues across the world. Stone currently resides and practices in New York.

== Influence ==
Alison Stone's Inspiration originally stemmed from punk and incorporates themes such as spirituality and myth. Her religious background in Judaism, and experiences of gender inequality within the religion, influenced her to re-write and add a feminist spin on biblical tales such as Lot's Wife, Lot's Daughters, and Jezebel.

== Awards ==
- LitSpace St. Petersburg Residency (2017)
- New York Quarterly’s Madeline Sadin Award
- Many Mountains Moving Poetry Award (2003)
- Poetry Foundation's Frederick Bock Prize (1995)

== Bibliography ==
=== Anthologies ===
- Stone, Alison (1994), Elledge, Jim (ed.), Sweet Nothings: An Anthology of Rock and Roll in American Poetry, Indiana University Press, ISBN 978-0-253-31936-4

=== Full length collections ===
- Informed. NYQ Books. 2024. ISBN 978-1-63045-107-3.
- To See What Rises. CW Books. 2023. ISBN 978-1625494252.
- Zombies at the Disco. Jacar Press. 2020. ISBN 978-0-936481-41-8.
- Caught in the Myth. NYQ Books. 2019. ISBN 978-1-63045-060-1.
- Stone, Alison; Greinke, Eric (2018). Masterplan. Presa Press. ISBN 978-0-996502-68-9.
- Dazzle. Jacar Press. 2017. ISBN 978-0-936481-18-0.
- Ordinary Magic. NYQ Books. 2016. ISBN 978-1-63045-031-1.
- Dangerous Enough. Presa Press. 2014. ISBN 978-0-9888279-3-6.
- They Sing at Midnight. Many Mountains Moving Press. 2014. ISBN 978-0-9888279-3-6.

=== Chapbooks ===
- From the Fool to the World. UW-Madison Libraries Parallel Press. 2012. ISBN 9781934795408.
