= Hyper Sapien: People from Another Star =

- Directed by: Peter R. Hunt
- Written by: Christopher Adcock; Michael Wadleigh (as Christopher Blue); Marnie Page
- Story by: Michael Wadleigh (as Christopher Blue)
- Produced by: Jack Schwartzman
- Starring: Sydney Penny; Ricky Paull Goldin; Dennis Holahan; Keenan Wynn; Rosie Marcel; Hersha Parady; Peter Jason
- Cinematography: John Coquillon
- Music by: Arthur B. Rubinstein
- Production company: TaliaFilm II Productions
- Distributed by: Tri-Star Pictures
- Release date: December 19, 1986
- Running time: 92 min.
- Countries: Canada; United States
- Language: English

Hyper Sapien: People from Another Star is a 1986 Canadian-American science fiction film directed by Peter R. Hunt and starring Dennis Holahan, Ricky Paull Goldin, Sydney Penny, Keenan Wynn (in his final film), and Rosie Marcel.

== Plot ==
One night, three aliens from the planet Taros — a young woman named Robyn, a girl named Tavy, and a furry three-eyed, three-armed creature named Kirbi — stow away on a spaceship headed for Earth, and land near Aladdin, Wyoming. The next morning, the aliens befriend a rancher's son named Dirt while he's out riding fences on his motorcycle. Robyn shows off her bike-riding skills, and the quartet go to visit Dirt's grandparents. After Kirbi beats Grandpa at poker, the creature drinks a can of gasoline. Later, Kirbi keeps feeding the goats even though Grandpa wants him to feed the chickens. Grandpa then shows Kirbi how to shoot Coors cans with a gun while he complains about how much the world has changed. Dirt forms a relationship with Robyn, learning that her hair changes color depending on exposure to sunlight and that she's come from a moonbase and was supposed to go back to her home planet, rather than coming to Earth. Dirt tries to keep his new friends a secret from the rest of his family, but things get complicated when other aliens come looking for the missing trio, Grandpa shows Kirbi to some old folks at the General Store, and a Senator arrives at the ranch for a barbecue.

== Cast ==
- Sydney Penny as Robyn
- Ricky Paull Goldin as Robert "Dirt" McAlpin
- Dennis Holahan as Aric
- Keenan Wynn as Grandpa
- Rosie Marcel as Tavy
- Hersha Parady as Mrs. McAlpin
- Peter Jason as Mr. McAlpin
- Patricia Brookson as Cee Gee McAlpin
- Talia Shire as Dr. Tedra Rosen
- Marilyn Schreffler as the voice of Kirbi

== Production ==
Hyper Sapien was announced at the beginning of 1985 as one of two science fiction projects from producer Jack Schwartzman with the other being an unmade adaptation of The Stars My Destination with Michael Wadleigh (Woodstock, Wolfen) initially slated to direct. However, Wadleigh was asked to leave the project which lead to Peter R. Hunt taking over following producer Ariel Levy's offer.

This is the final movie appearance of actor Keenan Wynn, who died two months before the film's release.

The movie takes place in rural Wyoming, and was filmed in and around Calgary, Alberta.

== Release ==
Tri-Star Pictures had picked up the independent production for release with consideration for a July 1986 opening, but opted not to compete with other major summer films. The film ended up having a limited theatrical release, before being relegated to home video and cable TV airings such as on The Disney Channel.
