= Little House on the Prairie (1974 TV series) =

American Western drama television series (1974–1983)

- Also known as: Little House: A New Beginning
- Genre: Western; Historical drama
- Based on: Little House on the Prairie by Laura Ingalls Wilder
- Developed by: Blanche Hanalis
- Directed by: William F. Claxton; Maury Dexter; Victor French; Michael Landon; Leo Penn
- Starring: Michael Landon; Karen Grassle; Melissa Gilbert; Melissa Sue Anderson; Lindsay and Sidney Greenbush; Dean Butler; Richard Bull; Katherine MacGregor; Victor French
- Theme music composer: David Rose
- Composer: David Rose
- Country of origin: United States
- Original language: English
- No. of seasons: 9
- No. of episodes: 200 (+5 specials) (list of episodes)

Production
- Executive producers: Michael Landon; Ed Friendly
- Producers: John Hawkins; William F. Claxton
- Running time: 48‒49 minutes
- Production companies: Ed Friendly Productions; NBC Productions

Original release
- Network: NBC
- Release: September 11, 1974 – March 21, 1983

Related
- Little House on the Prairie (film); Father Murphy

Little House on the Prairie is an American Western historical drama television series loosely based on the Little House on the Prairie book series by Laura Ingalls Wilder. The series is centered on the Ingalls family, who live on a farm on Plum Creek near Walnut Grove, Minnesota, in the 1870s–1890s. Charles, Caroline, Laura, Mary, and Carrie Ingalls are respectively portrayed by Michael Landon, Karen Grassle, Melissa Gilbert, Melissa Sue Anderson, and twins Lindsay and Sydney Greenbush.

In 1972, with the encouragement of his wife and daughter, television producer and former NBC executive Ed Friendly acquired the film and television rights to Wilder's novels from Roger Lea MacBride and engaged Blanche Hanalis to write the teleplay for a two-hour motion picture pilot. Friendly then asked Michael Landon to direct the pilot; Landon agreed on the condition that he could also play Charles Ingalls. Conflict between Friendly's and Landon's vision for the show ultimately led to the disinvolvement of Friendly in the production, leaving complete creative control to Michael Landon.

The pilot, which first aired on March 30, 1974, was based on Laura Ingalls Wilder's third Little House book, Little House on the Prairie. The rest of the regular series premiered on the NBC network on September 11, 1974, and last aired on March 21, 1983. In the show's ninth and final season, with the departure of Michael Landon, the title was changed to Little House: A New Beginning. Three post-series movies were made. Since the original series run, the show has aired continuously in syndication and is available on a number of streaming platforms.

Although initial reviews from critics were less than positive, the series ultimately became an audience favorite, with strong ratings through most of the series run. Initial reviews drew comparisons to The Waltons, which was getting solid ratings at the time. Ultimately, positive reviews followed the first season until cancellation, and continued through syndication as the show has remained popular with audiences.

== Synopsis ==
Loosely based on the autobiographical Little House series, episodes of Little House on the Prairie usually concern members of the Ingalls family, who live on a small farm near the village of Walnut Grove, Minnesota. Many episodes concern the maturation of the family's second daughter, Laura. Other episodes focus on family and community members, providing a depiction of life in a small agrarian community in late nineteenth-century America. The show's central characters are Charles Ingalls (farmer and mill worker), his wife Caroline, and their three daughters, Mary, Laura, and Carrie, though the family expands as the seasons progress.

At the conclusion of season 4, Mary has gone blind and is sent to a school for the blind in Iowa, leaving Walnut Grove behind. This introduces Adam Kendall, a teacher at the school who is also blind. Meanwhile, in Walnut Grove, the school has closed, with no plans to reopen, as Miss Beadle marries and leaves Walnut Grove. At the opening of season 5, Adam, with Mary's help, starts a new school for the blind in Winoka, Dakota. The Ingalls move to Winoka, and the Garveys and Olesons soon follow, as the economic situation in Walnut Grove has soured. An orphan in Winoka, Albert, becomes a recurring character. When the families move back to Walnut Grove, the Ingalls take Albert with them. Later in season 5, the blind school in Winoka must close, and the decision is made to merge with another school from Kansas, moving both to Walnut Grove.

The story line in season 6 introduces the Wilders—Eliza Jane, who arrives to replace Alice Garvey as the teacher in Walnut Grove, and her brother Almanzo. By the conclusion of the season, the romance between Almanzo and Laura has blossomed to a marriage proposal, with the couple agreeing to wait a year to be married. As season 7 begins, Eliza Jane leaves Walnut Grove, with Laura being offered the position of teacher in the school. Adam Kendall regains his sight and becomes a lawyer. Although they still have six months of their agreed engagement period, Laura and Almanzo are married in the season's two-part premier.

Following season 8, Michael Landon decided to leave the show and the series was re-titled Little House: A New Beginning. The focus is placed on the characters of Laura and Almanzo. Charles is forced to sell the house and move to Burr Oak, Iowa, to pursue new work. Laura and Almanzo remain central characters as more characters are added to the cast. A new family, John Carter, along with his wife Sarah and sons Jeb and Jason, move into the Ingalls house. When Almanzo's brother dies, Almanzo and Laura take in their niece Jenny Wilder, and raise her alongside their own daughter Rose.

== Cast and characters ==
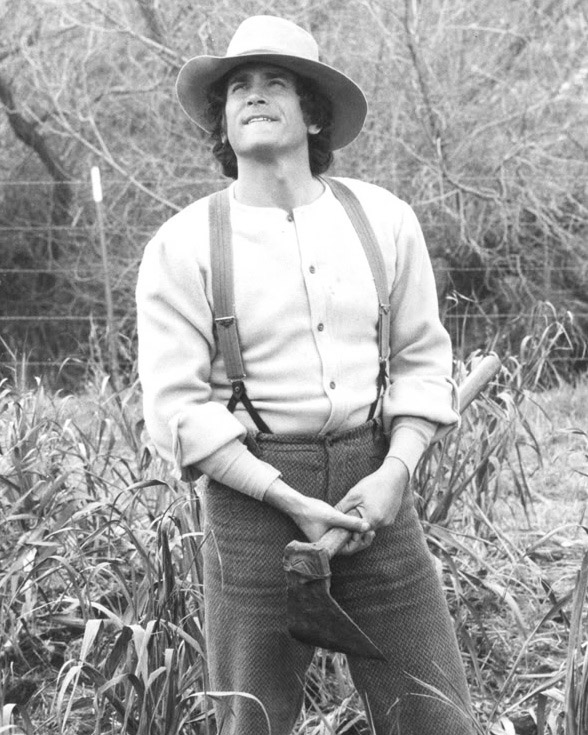
Michael Landon as Charles "Pa" Ingalls on Little House on the Prairie, 1974

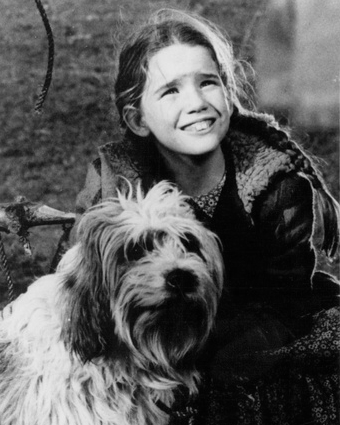
Laura Ingalls (played by Melissa Gilbert) with her dog Jack (played by Barney), 1975

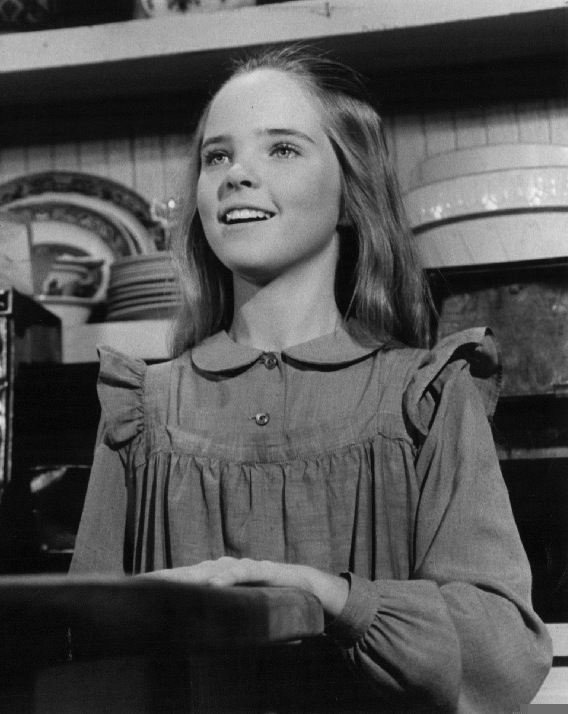
Melissa Sue Anderson as Mary Ingalls on Little House on the Prairie, 1974

=== Main cast ===
- Michael Landon as Charles Ingalls (seasons 1–8; guest season 9; two post-series movies)
- Karen Grassle as Caroline Ingalls (seasons 1–8; guest in one post-series movie)
- Melissa Gilbert as Laura Ingalls Wilder
- Melissa Sue Anderson as Mary Ingalls Kendall (seasons 1–7; guest season 8)
- Lindsay and Sidney Greenbush as Carrie Ingalls (seasons 1–8)
- Dean Butler as Almanzo Wilder (season 9; recurring 6–8; three post series movies)
- Katherine MacGregor as Harriet Oleson (season 9; recurring seasons 1–8)
- Richard Bull as Nels Oleson (season 9; recurring seasons 1–8; three post series movies)
- Victor French as Isaiah Edwards (season 9; three post-series movies; recurring seasons 1–3, 6, 8)

=== Recurring cast ===
- Kevin Hagen as Dr. Hiram Baker
- Karl Swenson as Lars Hanson (seasons 1–4; guest season 5)
- Dabbs Greer as Rev. Robert Alden
- Charlotte Stewart as Eva Beadle Simms (seasons 1–4)
- Bonnie Bartlett as Grace Snider Edwards (seasons 1–6)
- Ted Gehring as Ebenezer Sprague (seasons 2–3)
- Jim Jeter as Hans Dorfler (seasons 3–4, guest seasons 1–2, 6)
- Alison Arngrim as Nellie Oleson Dalton (seasons 1–7; guest season 9)
- Jonathan Gilbert as Willie Oleson (seasons 1–9; two post-series movies)
- Merlin Olsen as Jonathan Garvey (seasons 4–7)
- Hersha Parady as Alice Garvey (seasons 4–6)
- Patrick Labyorteaux as Andrew "Andy" Garvey (seasons 4–7)
- Hermione Baddeley as Kezia Horne (season 5–7)
- Matthew Labyorteaux as Albert Quinn Ingalls (seasons 5–8; guest season 9; one post-series movie)
- Linwood Boomer as Adam Kendall (seasons 5–8; guest season 4)
- Lucy Lee Flippin as Eliza Jane Wilder (recurring seasons 6–8)
- Steve Tracy as Percival Dalton (season 7; guest season 6)
- Allison Balson as Nancy Oleson (seasons 8–9, three post-series movies)
- Jason Bateman as James Cooper Ingalls (season 8; guest season 7)
- Melissa Francis as Cassandra Cooper Ingalls (season 8; guest season 7)
- Wendi & Brenda Turnbaugh as Grace Ingalls (seasons 5–8)
- Ketty Lester as Hester-Sue Terhune (season 5–9)
- Stan Ivar as John Carter (season 9; three post-series movies)
- Pamela Roylance as Sarah Reed Carter (season 9; three post-series movies)
- Lindsay Kennedy as Jeb Carter (season 9; three post-series movies)
- David Friedman as Jason Carter (season 9; three post-series movies)
- Shannen Doherty as Jenny Wilder (season 9; three post-series movies)
- Leslie Landon as Etta Plum (season 9; three post-series movies)
- Robert Casper as Sherwood Montague (three post-series movies; guest season 9)
- Sherri Stoner as Rachel Brown Oleson (three post-series movies; guest season 9)
- Moses Gunn as Joe Kagan (season 4–7)

=== Guest stars ===
Little House had many guest stars and incorporated a number of well-known actors, including Academy Award winners such as Ernest Borgnine ("The Lord is My Shepherd"), Red Buttons ("The Circus Man"), and Patricia Neal ("Remember Me").

Other established performers included Forrest Tucker ("Founder's Day"), Richard Basehart ("Troublemaker"), Theodore Bikel ("Centennial"), Johnny Cash ("The Collection"), Burl Ives ("The Hunters"), John Ireland ("Little Girl Lost" and "The Winoka Warriors"), Nehemiah Persoff ("The Stranger"), Ray Bolger ("There's No Place Like Home: Part I" and "Come Dance with Me"), Arthur Hill ("Journey in the Spring"), Jan Sterling ("Journey in the Spring: Part I"), Billy Barty ("Annabelle" and "Little Lou"), Kathryn Leigh Scott ("Blind Man's Bluff"), Ford Rainey ("Four Eyes" and "I'll Be Waving as You Drive Away: Part I"), Richard Jaeckel ("The Long Road Home" and "Sylvia"), and Barry Sullivan ("Author, Author").

Some guests were second generation performers, such as Dirk Blocker ("School Mom"), son of Bonanza's Dan Blocker, Anne Archer ("Doctor's Lady"), daughter of Marjorie Lord and John Archer, and Julie Cobb ("Money Crop"), daughter of The Virginian's Lee J. Cobb.

== Episodes ==
Season	Episodes	Originally released	
Season	Episodes	First released	Last released
Pilot movie		March 30, 1974	
1	23	September 11, 1974	May 7, 1975
2	22	September 10, 1975	March 31, 1976
3	21	September 27, 1976	April 4, 1977
4	22	September 12, 1977	March 13, 1978
5	24	September 11, 1978	March 19, 1979
6	23	September 17, 1979	May 12, 1980
The Little House Years		November 15, 1979	
7	22	September 22, 1980	May 11, 1981
8	22	October 5, 1981	May 10, 1982
9	21	September 27, 1982	March 21, 1983
Post-series Movies		December 12, 1983	December 17, 1984

== Background and production ==
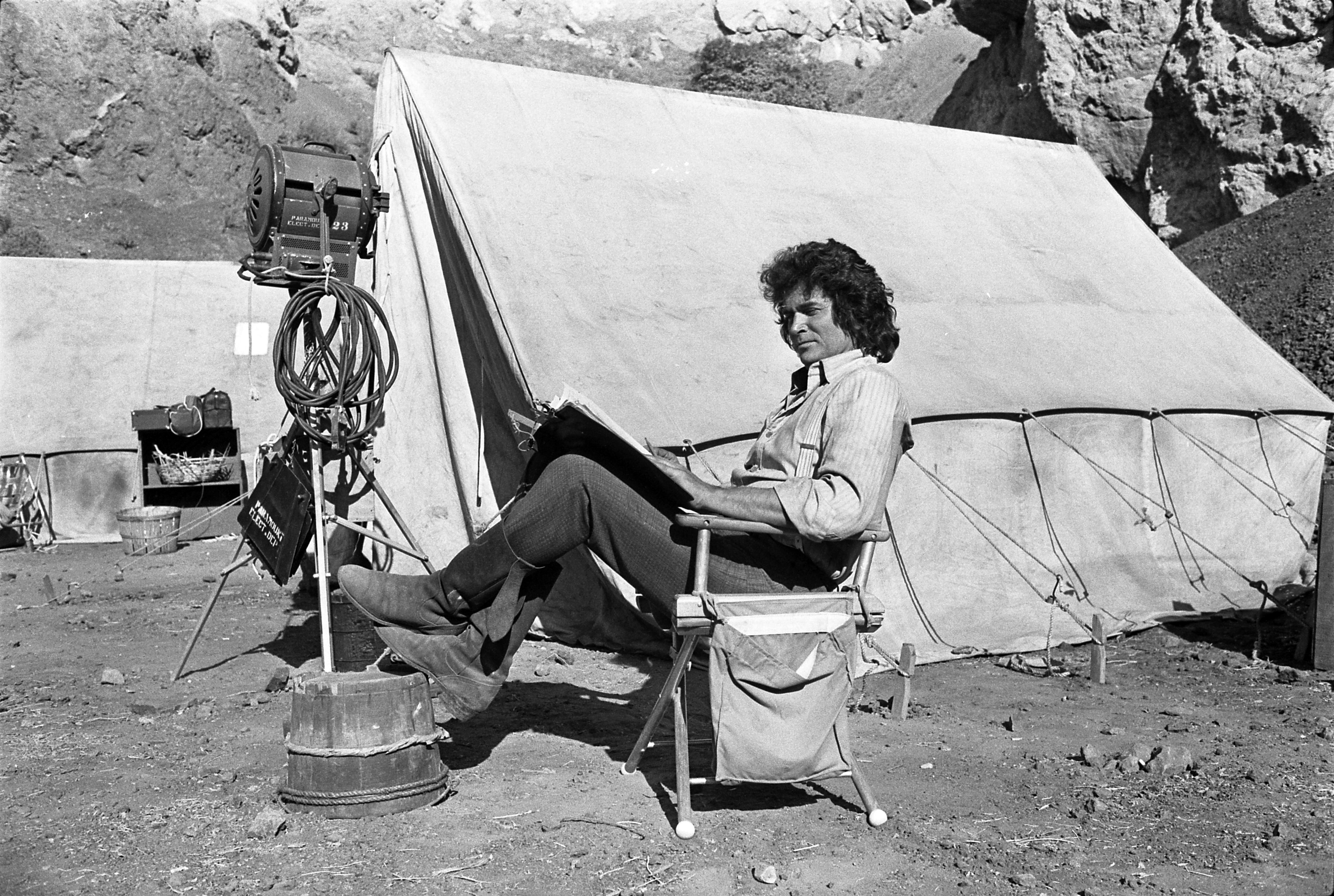
Michael Landon on the set of Little House on the Prairie

=== Development ===
Ed Friendly, former television executive and producer of Rowan & Martin's Laugh-In, had noticed that his daughter had a habit of reading Laura Ingalls Wilder's series of books every year and was convinced they had enormous licensing potential. The copyrights of the works were at the time owned by Roger MacBride. Friendly purchased the television rights to Little House on the Prairie to develop a family-oriented series, while he and Blanche Hanalis wrote the initial screenplay; but the result was not received well by the networks.

Upon seeing the Bonanza episode "The Wish" directed by Michael Landon, Friendly thought Landon could possibly direct the series. Friendly's daughter delivered a copy of the screenplay to Landon, after which the latter not only wanted to direct the pilot, but also to star in it. Following the cancellation of Bonanza, Landon had been given an exclusive contract with NBC to develop new projects. When Landon discovered his daughter had been reading the book series and that his wife had also read them, he also saw the opportunity for a family-oriented series that would encourage children to read. NBC was hesitant; they would be committing to a project from an era the networks were leaving behind. But NBC ultimately trusted Landon's intuition and committed to a two-hour pilot movie and a series to follow if ratings warranted.

Although they agreed that the series should look authentic, Friendly and Landon had different visions of what that meant. Among other differences, Friendly wanted the Charles Ingalls character to have a full beard, while Landon thought it would be bad for his image. Friendly wanted to strictly follow the stories in the books. Landon, on the other hand, noted that a series run of several years would require much more drama and character development. Eventually, Friendly wanted Landon removed. However, NBC backed Landon, and Friendly ended up as a silent partner, leaving the show in mid-1974. Ultimately, Landon "closely-supervised dimensions of story and character that were not present in the original material... nurtured the cast and crew, directed and wrote most of the stories, and entirely supervised every detail of the series." As executive producer, his "personal vision is embossed on every one of the 204 color episodes". The result is a series that is "so different from the books as to constitute a separate body of work".

=== Casting ===
Following NBC's commitment to the series, Landon put his effort into casting. Forty-seven actresses were auditioned for the role of Caroline Ingalls before Landon settled on Karen Grassle. Hersha Parady had been seriously considered for the role. However, Landon thought Grassle was perfect because she "looked like a pioneer woman". Grassle had very little in the way of television and no film acting experience. She was primarily a theater actress with university training and a degree in theater, along with a number of repertory theater credits. Landon also cast other actors with theater backgrounds and minimal television exposure including Katherine MacGregor and Richard Bull.

Landon's most difficult task was casting the children. He did not want "professional daughters with stage mothers". He wanted "real little girls". He selected Melissa Sue Anderson as Mary, and Melissa Gilbert as Laura, and gave them the nicknames "Missy" and "Half Pint" so they could be told apart on set. Anderson had only been working in television for less than a year, while the 9-year old Gilbert had been working in television since she was three. Hollywood's work rules for small children required the use of twins for the character of Carrie, who was played by Lindsay and Sidney Greenbush.

=== Writing ===
Writing was one of the many creative differences between Ed Friendly and Michael Landon. Friendly wanted to remain faithful to the original storylines of the books, while Landon saw that producing at least 22 hours of episodic television per year would make it necessary to build fictional stories around the incidents from the books. Landon also incorporated completely invented characters not found in the books. Thus, only some of the material for the series was taken directly from the books by Laura Ingalls Wilder, as well as from the actual lives of the Ingalls family. While many of the stories were pure fabrications, each was meant to be true to the character of the book series.

The original screenplay adaptation was written by Ed Friendly and Blanche Hanalis. As many as a dozen script ideas were later submitted by Ed Friendly and Roger MacBride, but all were rejected. Other writers, including Michael Landon, were used for the series and the post-series movies.

Some episodes written by Michael Landon were recycled storylines he had written for Bonanza. In season 5, the episode "Someone Please Love Me" had the same theme as the Bonanza episode "A Dream to Dream". Likewise, "Little Lou" in season 9 conveyed the same theme as the Bonanza episode "It's a Small World". To feature Karen Grassle, Landon wrote "A Matter of Faith" in season 2 based on the Bonanza episode "A Matter of Circumstance".

=== Production design ===
Both Ed Friendly and Michael Landon wanted the series to look authentic. Landon studied books on frontier life, using them to develop the set design, including tools and household utensils. Along with series production designer Trevor Williams, Landon reviewed more than 50 books about frontier life in 1870s Minnesota. Each building used was a replica of an actual building. Walter Jefferies served as art director for the series.

Make-up was supervised by Allan "Whitey" Snyder, who had been Marilyn Monroe's personal make-up artist. One of the problems that had to be addressed with the child actors was what to do about dental braces, which were not something one would see on a homesteading child of the 1870s. Melissa Gilbert and Alison Arngrim each at one point had braces which were hidden by white candle wax applied to their teeth.

The lead hair stylist was Larry Germain. Several female characters were outfitted with wigs in order to present a more period-authentic look. Originally, Alison Arngrim's hair was her own, but this required constant curling of her naturally straight hair. After a short period of filming with her own hair, Germain had Siegfried Geike create a wig for Arngrim.

=== Filming ===
From the beginning of the pilot, cinematography was handled by Ted Voigtlander, giving a picture of what prairie homesteaders faced in the late 19th century. He remained as principal cinematographer throughout the series, and for the three post-series movies.

Initially, two sound stages at Paramount Studios in Los Angeles were used for the interior shots. This included the massive sound stage 31 at Paramount. In 1978, filming moved to stage 15 at MGM Studios. This was the biggest soundstage at MGM, having been the set for The Wizard of Oz.

Location filming for the pilot was done in Sonora, California. During the series, exterior shots for the Ingalls home at Plum Creek and the village of Walnut Grove were filmed at the Big Sky Ranch in Simi Valley. The arid desert land of Ventura county was watered by a series of underground pipes to convert the California desert into a greener Minnesota. Old Tucson Studios was also used for location filming as the village of Mankato, Minnesota.

As a period show, outside dialogue was looped to avoid the potential of sounds such as cars or airplanes.

=== Music ===
The series theme song was titled "The Little House" and was written and conducted by David Rose. Rose composed and scored the music for the pilot movie, 204 episodes of the series, and the movies. The ending theme music, also written by Rose, originally appeared as a piece of incidental music in "Top Hand", a January 17, 1971, episode of Michael Landon's previous series, Bonanza.

=== Cancellation ===
In a 1980 interview, Michael Landon stated the series would end after season eight due to "many contractual agreements". The show continued beyond that, going into a ninth season. As ratings declined in the final season, Landon felt that the series had run its course, noting, "[W]hen we started this show, we never imagined it would last this long". The 1982–83 television season was the final season for the series, after which three made-for-television movies were released: Little House: Look Back to Yesterday (1983), Little House: The Last Farewell (1984), and Little House: Bless All the Dear Children (1984).

The Last Farewell was the final movie to be filmed and incorporated a unique ending in which each townsperson takes a turn blowing up his own building in an emotional farewell to the town. The reason for the ending was due to an agreement NBC made with the property owners when it leased the land from the Getty Oil Company and Newhall Land and Development Corporation. The agreement required that at end of the series, the acreage would be put back to its original state. Michael Landon decided to write the demolition into the show, thus dismantling the sets on camera.

== Themes ==
Opinions vary on whether the series is considered a Western, with critics generally split on this point. Tim Brooks and Earle Marsh in The Complete Directory to Prime Time Network and Cable TV Shows 1946–Present suggest that the series is "not a Western in the usual sense. There were no cowboys, Indians, or cowtown saloons in this version of frontier life—it was more like The Waltons in a different setting." The producers deliberately avoided the "black hat" conflict of the standard Western, even though critics claimed the show lacked action. In The BFI Companion to the Western, Edward Buscombe calls it a "middle Western" and a domestic Western. Most television critics have classified it as a "pioneer drama" or a "family Western". The series hit several themes that place it within the Western genre, including "cowboys and Indians" (pilot and "Freedom Flight"), its west of the Mississippi setting, as well as gunplay and violence. It has also been characterized as a "prairie soap opera" or a "soap opera with horses".

With total creative control, Michael Landon presented a vision of "the strong, honest pioneer family whose spirit of love and devotion overcomes all physical harshness and obstacles of the heart, and always taught a moral". He put more emphasis on the family's courage rather than their weaknesses. This is especially prominent in the character of Charles Ingalls. Landon preferred a portrayal of Charles that was different from that presented in the books, almost a total opposite. Landon presented him as strong and wise, yet able to maintain his vulnerability. In The Myth of the American Superhero, John Shelton Lawrence and Robert Jewett describe this portrayal using the model of the "Heidi man" as a monomythic hero who, like Heidi, uses nonviolence to "heal the sick and bring happiness to the lonely". They describe the themes of Little House as "domestic redeemer tales" and Landon as a "male Heidi [figure] who redeem[s] by nonviolent manipulations". Using the September 24, 1975, season 2 episode "Ebenezer Sprague" as an example, Lawrence and Jewett delve into the Pa Ingalls character as embodying the hero's journey of the monomyth.

Church, faith, and prayer were all strong themes in the series, in a way that reflected Landon's personal experience. Religious themes are more prominent in the television series than they are in the original book series. As historian John Fry notes in A Prairie Faith: The Religious Life of Laura Ingalls Wilder, faith, and Christianity in particular, plays a part in the books, but it is not a central theme, whereas it is much more central to the television series. In Favorite Families of TV, Christopher and Michael Denis suggest that "[t]his show in many ways was about a strong Christian family struggling to practice Christian principles". Episodes contained a type of sermonizing that was not a "fire-and-brimstone kind of preachiness, but always the moral lesson learned through tolerance of those different from us, compassion for those less fortunate, patience with those less able".

Landon's writing not only reflected his personal experience, but also his views on social issues. Little House explored themes involving many social issues including adoption, alcoholism, faith, poverty, blindness, menopause, aging, and death. Other plots include subjects of contemporary social issues such as leukemia, child abuse, premarital sex, and rape. The challenges of a Civil War soldier's struggle with drug addiction and suicide in "Soldier's Return" mirrored the struggles of the returning Vietnam War veterans of the 1970s. Melissa Gilbert noted that Landon "was very vocal in his support of people of color and women and very against a lot of the violence and bigotry that he was seeing in the world". This is echoed in the plotlines of episodes that deal with prejudice and bigotry of various types. The episodes "Dark Sage" and "Injun Kid" deal directly with racism, while "Come, Let Us Reason Together" addresses antisemitism. Prejudice against new and different ideas is explored in "Whisper Country" and prejudice against little people is seen in "Little Lou".

== Release ==
=== Broadcast ===
The pilot movie aired on NBC, March 30, 1974. Beginning September 11, 1974, the series began airing on Wednesday nights in the 8:00–9:00 ET timeslot. It was moved to Monday nights in the 8:00–9:00 ET timeslot on September 27, 1976 and remained in that timeslot until cancellation.

Following the cancellation of the series, NBC aired three made-for-television movies. Look Back to Yesterday aired on December 12, 1983, The Last Farewell aired on February 6, 1984, and Bless All the Dear Children aired December 17, 1984. Bless All the Dear Children was filmed prior to The Last Farewell, but ended up being the last of the three movies to air. Given its Christmas-related content, NBC made a last-minute decision to change the broadcast order, airing it during the Christmas season. A voice-over was added explaining the events occurred prior to the destruction of the town to resolve the continuity problem.

In the United States, NBC originally licensed syndication rights for Little House on the Prairie to Worldvision Enterprises for a period of thirty-five years, since fin-syn rules prohibited networks from airing syndicated programs in which they had a financial stake. Following its original run, the series has aired continuously in syndication, having been broadcast in more than 100 countries.

=== Home media and streaming services ===
Initially, some individual episodes were released on DVD and VHS. In 2003, as DVD players reached more than half of the homes with VCRs for the first time, and trends began towards watching entire seasons on DVD, full seasons of Little House were released on DVD by Goldhil in partnership with NBC Enterprises. In the U.S. and Canada, NBC Enterprises partnered with Imavision Distribution to release full-season collector's editions, due to Imavision's expertise in family-oriented products. These initial releases used time compressed episodes that had been prepared for syndication. These sets included interviews with former cast members Alison Arngrim and Dean Butler. For the original movies and complete series sets, Imavision included special features such as interviews with cast members such as Melissa Gilbert and Melissa Sue Anderson, as well as specials highlighting Michael Landon and the casting of the show.

Lionsgate signed an exclusive distribution agreement with Imavision in 2007 to release the entire series on DVD. In 2014, Lionsgate Home Entertainment began re-releasing the series in North America formatted as blu-ray full-frame, DVD full-frame, and ultraviolet HD digital download. The episodes were restored to their original broadcast length and were remastered for high-definition picture and sound. Seasons 1 through 6 each contain a roughly 15-minute segment of a special called "The Little House Phenomenon". Following the release of the series, an all-movie collection was released in 2016.

To address declining DVD sales in Canada, Imavision began offering the series via real-time streaming in 2012. This was followed by streaming on Amazon Prime Video in 2019 and Peacock in 2020. Availability on free ad-supported streaming television (FAST) channels began with Amazon Freevee and Xumo in 2023 and expanded to platforms such as The Roku Channel and Pluto TV. Little House is one of the most popular FAST channels available. In January 2025, Nielsen Media Research recognized the show with an ARTEY award as a top streaming legacy program with 13.25 billion minutes viewed on Peacock in 2024. According to Nielsen, 63% of Little House's viewing total was from adults 35-64 and it over-indexed among black viewers, which comprised 17% of its viewership.

== Reception ==
=== Critical reviews ===
The New York Times television critic John J. O'Connor gave the pilot film mixed reviews but also noted that it "contained enough family warmth and struggle to make The Waltons look like a pack of pampered snobs", noting that the possibility of a weekly series did have promise. The series itself, however, did not start off with positive reviews. Landon biographer Marsha Daly said, "It was as if they resented its simple, sweet characters, and preferred the trash-with-flash type shows then making in-roads on television." Daly specifically notes a review by Richard Schidel of Time in which he said that Landon looked "as if he just stepped out of a unisex beauty salon on the Strip rather than 430 episodes of Bonanza" and that the show seemed "to be striving for a simple, straightforward style, minimizing both molodramatic and sentimental excesses". Writing for TV Guide, Cleveland Amory wrote, "the show wants to have it both ways... an adult show and a children's show. It isn't bad as either... [b]ut if it had decided to be just one or the other, it would have been a whole lot better". By the end of the first season, Amory noted that TV Guide's most disagreeing mail was his critique of Little House, and that most viewers considered it to be a good family show. Having admitted to going back to watch it again, he agreed that he had been too hard on it.

Perhaps one of the most glowing reviews came from The Christian Science Monitor when it wrote that "to watch Little House on the Prairie is to fall in love with a time, a place, a way of life, a particular family", further noting that it was "an astounding, skillful production". Early reviews made constant comparisons to The Waltons, a comparison that flattered Landon. During the airing of the series, in 1975 a poll of Scholastic Newstime named the show its national favorite.

Even after the series was cancelled and entered syndication, it continues to receive positive reactions from viewers. In 1993, the series was named "All-Time Best Family Show" by a TV Guide readers' poll. In 1997, TV Guide included the two-part episode "I'll Be Waving as You Drive Away" as #97 on its 100 Greatest Episodes of All Time list. The episode was about Mary going blind. The BFI Companion to the Western calls the episodes written and directed by Landon, "among the finest episodic stories ever aired for this type of drama". Christopher and Michael Denis wrote in Favorite Families of TV, "The fact that the series was a resounding success, and continues resonating in syndication, affirms Landon's belief in his own visions and his remarkable ability to translate them successfully for a mass audience both in the U.S. and abroad." Even as recently as 2020, outlets such as The New York Times have described it as "perfectly balanced between sweet and sour", while highlighting its simplicity, self-sufficiency, and sentimentality.

=== Viewership ===
The pilot movie beat the competition with a 26.2 rating, representing roughly 45% of all television sets in operation at the time. With the success of the pilot, the series was scheduled into the fall line-up for Wednesday nights at 8 pm.

Although the pilot was a ratings success, the series began with low initial ratings. While NBC had concerns, it believed that Landon's production was one of its better bets. Realizing that it takes time to build an audience for a quality show, NBC was not about to cancel a program that was receiving high praise from parents and teacher groups. Season 1 had moderate ratings, while season 2 was the lowest-ranked season of the series. In 1976, the series was moved to a Monday night time slot. From season three through season 7 it was one of NBC's highest-rated scripted series. In season 4, it reached a peak of seventh in the Nielsen ratings, the highest-rated show for NBC that season.

Viewership and ratings per season of Little House on the Prairie
Season	Timeslot (ET)	Episodes	First aired	Last aired	TV season	Viewership rank	Avg. viewers (millions)	Avg. 18–49 rating	Ref.
1	Wednesday 8 p.m.	24	September 11, 1974	May 7, 1975	1974–75	13	16.1	23.5	
2	Wednesday 8 p.m.	22	September 10, 1975	March 31, 1976	1975–76	33	N/A	N/A	
3	Monday 8 p.m.	22	September 27, 1976	April 4, 1977	1976–77	16	15.9	22.3	
4	Monday 8 p.m.	22	September 12, 1977	March 13, 1978	1977–78	7	17.6	24.1	
5	Monday 8 p.m.	24	September 11, 1978	March 19, 1979	1978–79	14	17.2	23.1	
6	Monday 8 p.m.	24	September 17, 1979	May 12, 1980	1979–80	16	16.6	21.8	
7	Monday 8 p.m.	22	September 22, 1980	May 11, 1981	1980–81	10	17.7	22.1	
8	Monday 8 p.m.	22	October 5, 1981	May 10, 1982	1981–82	25	15.6	19.1	
9	Monday 8 p.m.	21	September 27, 1982	March 21, 1983	1982–83	29	14.5	17.4	

=== Accolades ===
Year	Organization	Award	Result	Ref(s)
1976	Emmy Award	Outstanding Achievement in Cinematography for Entertainment Programming for a Series, Ted Voigtlander, "Remember Me"	Nominated	
1976	TP de Oro, Spain	Mejor Actriz Extranjera (Best Foreign Actress), Karen Grassle	Won	
1978	Emmy Award	Outstanding Lead Actress in a Drama Series, Melissa Sue Anderson	Nominated	
1978	Emmy Award	Outstanding Cinematography in Entertainment Programming for a Series, Ted Voigtlander, episode "The Fighter"	Won	
1979	Emmy Award	Outstanding Cinematography for a Series, Ted Voigtlander, episode "The Craftsman"	Won	
1979	Emmy Award	Outstanding Music Composition for a Series, David Rose, episode "The Craftsman"	Won	
1980	Emmy Award	Outstanding Cinematography for a Series, Ted Voigtlander, episode "May We Make Them Proud"	Nominated	
1980	TP de Oro, Spain	Mejor Actriz Extranjera (Best Foreign Actress), Melissa Sue Anderson	Won	
1981	Emmy Award	Outstanding Cinematography for a Series, Ted Voigtlander, episode "Sylvia"	Nominated	
1981	Western Writers of America	Spur Award for Best TV Script, Michael Landon, episode "May We Make Them Proud"	Won	
1982	Emmy Award	Outstanding Achievement in Music Composition for a Series (Dramatic Underscore), David Rose, episode "He Was Only Twelve" (Part 2)	Won	
1982	Emmy Award	Outstanding Cinematography for a Series, Ted Voigtlander, episode "He Was Only Twelve"	Nominated	
1983	Emmy Award	Outstanding Cinematography for a Series, Harry Wolf, episode "The Wild Boy"	Nominated	
1983	Young Artist Award	Best Young Actress in a Drama Series, Melissa Gilbert	Won	
1984	Young Artist Award	Best Young Actress in a Drama Series, Melissa Gilbert	Won	

== Subsequent adaptations ==
Following the production of the pilot movie and his objections to how Little House was adapted for the screen, Ed Friendly remained involved in name only, although he retained billing in the show's credits and received royalty payments. Friendly teamed up again with Blanche Hanalis to produce a similar series based on books from Rose Wilder Lane. The television film The Young Pioneers was faithful to the book and received positive reviews from The New York Times. After a second movie, ABC bought the series and turned it over to Lorimar Productions, with Earl Hamner as executive producer. Although the series received positive reviews from critics, it was a flop for the network and was subsequently canceled.

Friendly also produced a six-part Little House on the Prairie miniseries for Wonderful World of Disney in 2005. These were based on two of Wilder's books and remained more faithful to the original material as Friendly had desired with the original series.

A musical adaption of Little House was staged and performed at the Guthrie Theater in Minnesota in 2008. The production starred Melissa Gilbert, this time in the role of Ma Ingalls. The production toured other cities in 2009.

In October 2012, Sony Pictures announced that a film adaptation of the Little House on the Prairie novel was under development. In early 2016, it was reported that Paramount Pictures had picked up the project in turnaround, but an agreement was never reached.

In December 2020, Paramount Television Studios and Anonymous Content announced they were developing a reboot as a one-hour dramatic series adaptation. Meeting together at the Monte-Carlo Television Festival in 2020, cast members of the original series expressed their doubts on the likelihood of success with such a project, suggesting that it would not work without the genius of Michael Landon.

On January 29, 2025, Netflix announced a new series based on the Little House on the Prairie books written by Laura Ingalls Wilder with CBS Studios in association with Anonymous Content Studios, following from the 2020 reboot plans. Trip Friendly, son of original series producer Ed Friendly, is an executive producer. Original cast members Allison Arngrim and Dean Butler told ReMIND Magazine the new series would be more focused on the original books, rather than a reboot of the original series.

== Legacy ==
Although there are fans of the book series who scorn the television series, many fans enjoy both the books and the show. Ultimately, the television series did serve to boost readership of the books, with many people coming to learn of the books from watching the series, bringing hundreds of thousands of new readers to the books. Additionally, it helped boost the popularity of historic sites where the Ingalls and Wilder families lived as well as leading to the creation of several museums. The original homesite in Walnut Grove, Minnesota averages 10,000 visitors per year.

Several cast members have written memoirs detailing their work on the series, including Melissa Gilbert in 2009, Melissa Anderson and Alison Arngrim in 2010, Charlotte Stewart in 2016, Karen Grassle in 2021, and Dean Butler in 2024.

Surviving cast members Melissa Gilbert, Melissa Anderson, Lindsay Greenbush, Matthew Labyorteaux, Alison Arngrim, Dean Butler, Charlotte Stewart, and Karen Grassle reunited for the show's 40th anniversary in 2014 for an Entertainment Weekly interview. It was the first time many of them had been together following the 1991 death of Michael Landon.

The 50th anniversary of the series in 2024 spawned multiple reunion interviews and appearances. In March, 2024, Melissa Gilbert, Karen Grassle, and Alison Angrim met for an interview ahead of a planned "Prairie Palooza" event at Big Sky Ranch in Simi Valley, California. The three-day event included panel interviews with cast members, exhibits of Little House artifacts such as scripts, merchandise, and other items, as well as recreated miniatures of some of the sets. Michael Landon's golf cart that had been made to look like a surrey was also on display. A documentary about the anniversary called "Loving Little House" aired in fall 2024 on Cozi TV.

Following the announcement of the potential remake moving forward in 2025, political commentator Megyn Kelly expressed concerns that producers might create a "woke" version of the series. Members of the original cast pointed out that the original series actually covered topics many consider to be "woke" such as racism, addiction, nativism, antisemitism, misogyny, rape, and spousal abuse. Melissa Gilbert suggested that the show's appeal is based on universal themes that were relevant not just when it aired, but decades after its release. Writing for Politico, Jason Kyle Howard suggested that the discussion illustrated how American society had become more politicized, and the show handled issues such as race and Christianity in ways that did not come across as partisan during its initial airing might be seen more controversially in the present day.
