= Kevin Hagen =

American actor (1928-2005)

- Born: April 3, 1928; Chicago, Illinois, U.S.
- Died: July 9, 2005 (aged 77); Grants Pass, Oregon, U.S.
- Occupation: Actor
- Years active: 1957–2004
- Spouse: Jan Hagen (m. 1993)

Kevin Hagen (April 3, 1928 – July 9, 2005) was an American actor best known for his role as Dr. Hiram Baker on NBC's TV series Little House on the Prairie.

Kevin Hagen played Ed Bosworth in a 1958 episode of Have Gun - Will Travel, titled "Three Sons."

== Early life ==
Hagen was born in Chicago, Illinois, to professional ballroom dancers, Haakon Olaf Hagen and Marvel Lucile Wadsworth. After his father deserted the family, Hagen was raised by his mother, grandmother, and aunts. As a 15-year-old, he relocated to Portland, Oregon, where one of his aunts had taken a teaching job.

Hagen attended Portland's Jefferson High School. His family returned to Chicago, and he attended Oregon State University in Corvallis and the University of Southern California in Los Angeles, California, from which he received a degree in international relations.

== Acting roles ==
Kevin Hagen in Little House on the Prairie

Hagen's first regular role on a series was in 1958 playing John Colton, the city administrator of New Orleans in the CBS Western Yancy Derringer.

On April 29, 1962, Hagen was cast in the episode "Cort" of Lawman.

Hagen guest-starred on Gunsmoke, The Big Valley, Bonanza, Laramie, Have Gun - Will Travel (playing Ed Bosworth in "Three Sons" S1E34, 1958), Mannix, The Time Tunnel, and Perry Mason. He made three appearances on Mason. In 1958 he played Sgt. Burke in "The Case of the Sardonic Sergeant"; in (1965) he played murderer Jacob Leonard in "The Case of the Gambling Lady", and Samuel Carleton in "The Case of the Fugitive Fraulein." Hagan appeared as Inspector Dobbs Kobick in nine episodes of Land of the Giants from 1968 to 1970.

Other appearances included Tales of Wells Fargo, The Untouchables, Bat Masterson, Riverboat, The High Chaparral, Wagon Train (S1 E21 "The Annie MacGregor Story" 1958 and S8 E25 “The Silver Lady” 1965), Outlaws, Straightaway, GE True, Hawaiian Eye, Voyage to the Bottom of the Sea, The Twilight Zone, Daniel Boone, Blue Light, Mission: Impossible, Rawhide, 77 Sunset Strip, M*A*S*H, The Rifleman (as Billy St.John in S2 E31 "The Prodigal" 1960), Lancer, The Virginian, The Guns of Will Sonnett, The Cowboys, Lost in Space, The Silent Force, Sara, Quincy, M.E., Simon & Simon, and Knots Landing.

Hagen played a Confederate renegade who kills James Stewart's son and daughter-in-law in the 1965 film Shenandoah. His most famous role was Doc Baker on Little House on the Prairie.

== Personal life and death ==
In 1992, Hagen moved to Grants Pass in southwestern Oregon where he performed in concerts, dinner theaters, and on stage in Medford, Ashland, and Grants Pass, including the one-man show A Playful Dose of Prairie Wisdom.

In 2004, Hagen was diagnosed with esophageal cancer. He died on July 9, 2005, at his home in Grants Pass. Hagen was survived by his son, Kristopher, and his wife, Jan, whom he married in 1993.

== Filmography ==
Year	Title	Role	Notes
1957	The Tales of Wells Fargo	Mitt	
1958	The Light in the Forest	Fiddler	Uncredited
1958	Gunsmoke in Tucson	Clem Haney	
1958	Gunsmoke	Bill Jennings	
1959	Gunsmoke	Coney Thorn	Episode: "Love of A Woman"
1959	Pork Chop Hill	Corporal Kissell	
1960	The Twilight Zone	Captain James Webber	Episode: "Elegy"
1961	The Untouchables	"Swede" Kelso	Episode: "Stranglehold"
1961	Straightaway	Frazer	Episode: "The Stranger"
1961–1967	Bonanza	Various	5 episodes
1962	Maverick	Justin Radcliffe	Episode: "One of Our Trains is Missing"
1962	Gunsmoke	Bowman	Episode: "Wagon Girls"
1962	Rider on a Dead Horse	Jake Fry	
1963	The Virginian	Oscar Swenson	Episode: "Run Away Home"
1963	The Man from Galveston	John Dillard	
1964	The Twilight Zone	Pete Radcliff	Episode: "You Drive"
1964	Rio Conchos	Major Johnson, aka "Blondebeard"	
1964	Gunsmoke	Emmett Ginnis	Episode: "No Hands"
1965	Shenandoah	Mule, Rebel Deserter	
1966	Voyage to the Bottom of the Sea	Holden	Episode: "The Shape Of Doom"
1966	The Time Tunnel	Greek Sword Leader	Episode "Revenge of the Gods"
1966	The Time Tunnel	McDonnell	Episode "Secret Weapon"
1967	Bonanza	Brother Guy	Episode: S9.E10 Showdown at Tahoe
1967	The Ride to Hangman's Tree	Prisoner	Uncredited
1967	The Last Challenge	Frank Garrison	
1967	The High Chaparral	Tanner	Episode "Shadows on the Land"
1967	The Time Tunnel	Sgt. Maddox	Episode: "The Death Merchant"
1967	The Time Tunnel	Alien Planet Leader	Episode: "Raiders from Outer Space"
1968–1970	Land of the Giants	Inspector Dobbs Kobick	9 episodes
1968	Voyage to the Bottom of the Sea	Komal	Episode: S4 E23 "Attack!"
1968	Big Valley	Unknown	Episode: "The Long Ride"
1968	Mission: Impossible	David Webster	Episode: "The Condemned"
1969	The Learning Tree	Tim "Doc" Cravens	
1969	Mission: Impossible	Kurt Lom	Episode: "Illusion"
1973	Gentle Savage	Ken Shaeffer	
1974–1984	Little House on the Prairie	Hiram "Doc" Baker	113 episodes & 3 TV movies
1976	M*A*S*H	Colonel Coner	Episode: "Some 38th Parallels”
1978	Quincy, M.E.	Dr. Dale Albers	Episode: "A Night to Raise the Dead"
1978	M*A*S*H	Major Goss	Episode: "Peace on Us"
1980	The Hunter	Poker Player #2	
1986	Power	Cop	
1990	The Ambulance	Cop At Stables	Final film role
