= Richard Bull (actor) =

American film, stage, and television actor

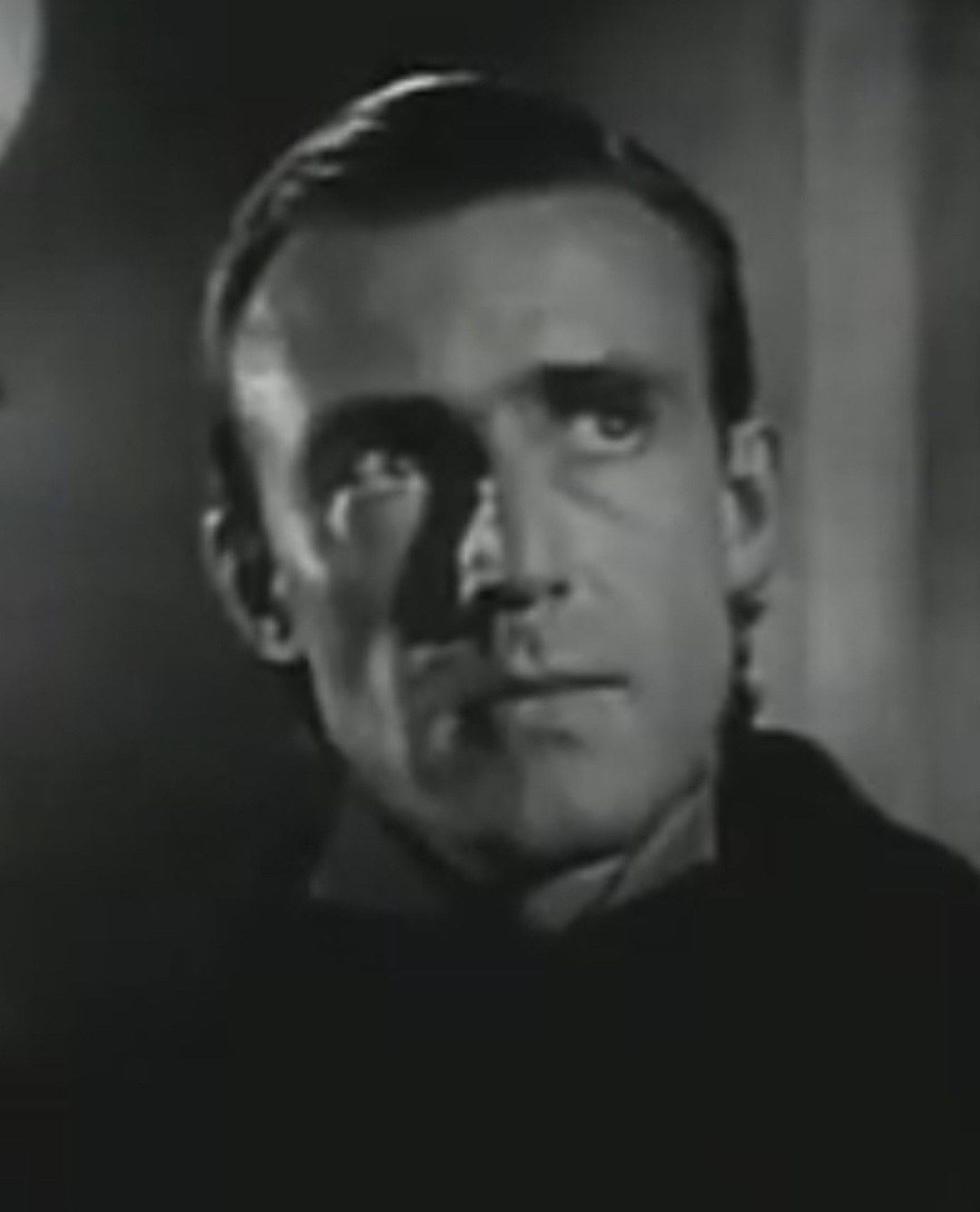
- Richard Bull in Tales of Frankenstein (1958)
- Born: Richard William Bull; June 26, 1924; Zion, Illinois, U.S.
- Died: February 3, 2014 (aged 89); Calabasas, California, U.S.
- Occupation: Actor
- Years active: 1956–2014
- Television: Little House on the Prairie
- Spouse: Barbara Collentine (m. 1948)

Richard William Bull (June 26, 1924 – February 3, 2014) was an American film, stage and television actor. He was best known for his performances as "Doc" on Voyage to the Bottom of the Sea and Nels Oleson on Little House on the Prairie.

== Personal life ==
Bull was born on June 26, 1924, in Zion, Illinois. After years of living in Los Angeles, he moved back to Chicago in 1994 with his wife Barbara Collentine.

Bull fell into acting by accident. “I never gave a serious consideration about becoming an actor. As a senior in high school, I decided to study music, but a friend suggested we attend the Goodman Theater School. In two weeks the friend dropped out, but I was hooked.” There was a three-year interruption while he served as a radio operator for the Army Air Corps, but when he was discharged in 1946 he resumed his acting studies at Goodman.

It was at the Goodman that he met his wife, also a notable actress, Barbara Collentine, and they became engaged in January 1948.

In 2012, the couple moved back to California to reside in the Motion Picture & Television Fund retirement home.

== Career ==
Bull began his stage career at the famous Goodman Theatre in Chicago. He said that a two-line part in The Greatest Story Ever Told "opened a lot of doors." Director George Stevens was impressed with Bull's emoting, and that "led directly to the role of an FBI agent in The Satan Bug," Bull said.

During the summer of 1948, Richard and Barbara performed in summer stock theatre at Bella Itkin's Lake Zurich Playhouse. There, Richard starred as Petruchio alongside Geraldine Page's Katherine in William Shakespeare's The Taming of the Shrew.

Following three years of acting in Chicago and another seven struggling to break through in New York, the couple relocated to Los Angeles do advance their careers.

Upon moving to Los Angeles, Richard and Barbara immersed themselves in the local theatre scene, frequently performing in two to three stage productions each year – sometimes individually, but often together. Although Richard's growing screen roles eventually limited his stage availability, his devotion to the medium never faded. As he put it "The theater keeps you alive as an actor."

Richard's television career gained real momentum in 1965 when he landed the role of the Seaview Doctor on Voyage to the Bottom of the Sea. He went on to appear in 27 episodes of the series alongside star Richard Basehart.

Richard Bull also crossed paths with Michael Landon prior to starring in Little House On the Prairie, when he played a rancher caught in a war, in an episode of Bonanza.

In 1974, on Little House on the Prairie, Richard's role as Nels Oleson had him portray the steady and fair-minded pillar of the Oleson family. The character had to balance keeping the peace with his overbearing wife Harriet (Katherine McGregor), and holding his children Nellie (Allison Arngrim) and Willie (Jonathan J. Gilbert) accountable.

He made more than 100 film and TV appearances.

== Death ==
Bull died on the morning of February 3, 2014, at the Motion Picture & Television Country House and Hospital in Calabasas, California, due to complications of pneumonia. He was 89 years old.

== Filmography ==
=== Film ===
- Full of Life (1956) as Doctor (uncredited)
- Fear Strikes Out (1957) as Reporter Slade (uncredited)
- Operation Mad Ball (1957) as Military Police Sergeant (uncredited)
- The True Story of Lynn Stuart (1958) as Customs Officer (uncredited)
- But Not for Me (1959) as Ticket Seller (uncredited)
- Then There Were Three (1961)
- Della (1964) as Mark Nodella
- The Satan Bug (1965) as Eric Cavanaugh
- In Like Flint (1967) as Newscaster (uncredited)
- Hour of the Gun (1967) as Thomas Fitch
- How to Steal the World (1968) as Captain Gelser (archive footage)
- The Thomas Crown Affair (1968) as Booth Guard
- The Secret Life of an American Wife (1968) as Howard
- The Stalking Moon (1968) as Doctor
- Moonfire (1970) as Hawkins
- Move (1970) as Keith
- Lawman (1971) as Dusaine
- The Andromeda Strain (1971) as an Air Force major
- Man and Boy (1971) as Thornhill
- Ulzana's Raid (1972) as Ginsford
- High Plains Drifter (1973) as Asa Goodwin
- The President's Plane is Missing (1973, TV Movie) as Flight Controller
- Executive Action (1973) as a gunman on "Team A"
- Breezy (1973) as Doctor
- Newman's Law (1974) as Immigration Man
- The Parallax View (1974) as Parallax Goon
- Mr. Sycamore (1975) as Dr. Ferfield
- A Different Story (1978) as Mr. Cooke
- A Day in a Life (2000) as Will
- The Secret (2001) as Grandpa
- Let's Go to Prison (2006) as Board Member #2
- Sugar (2008) as Earl Higgins
- Witless Protection (2008) as Sheriff Smoot
- Osso Bucco (2008) as Old Man Diner

=== Television ===
- Perry Mason (1958 – 1st-season episode 36) as Court Reporter in "The Case of the Prodigal Parent"
- Men Into Space (1959) as Radio Operator in "Asteroid"
- Highway Patrol (1959 – 4th-season episode 25) as bank robber, Bert Nelson
- Harrigan and Son (1961) as Lawson in "They Were All in Step But Jim"
- The Alfred Hitchcock Hour
  - (Season 1 Episode 14: "The Tender Poisoner") (1962) as Detective
  - (Season 1 Episode 27: "Death and the Joyful Woman") (1963) as Butler
  - (Season 3 Episode 28: "Night Fever") (1965) as Dr. Michaels
- Gunsmoke
  - as Nort in "Collie's Free" (1962)
  - as Deems in "The Sodbusters" (1972)
- My Three Sons (1962) as J. C. Dobbins
- The Eleventh Hour (1964) as Phil Whitman in "Sunday Father"
- Voyage to the Bottom of the Sea (1964-1968 TV Series) as The Doctor, various episodes
- Kentucky Jones (1965) as Harold Erkel in episodes "The Victim" and "The Return of Wong Lee"
- Blue Light (1966) in episode "Sacrifice!"
- Mission: Impossible (1966) as an agent for the Impossible Missions Force
- The Andy Griffith Show 2 episodes as Bill Lindsay and Mr.Jackson
- Mannix (1968–1974) 7 episodes as 4 different characters
- Gomer Pyle, USMC (1966) as the psychologist in the episode "Gomer and the Little Space Men".
- Hawaii Five-O (1969) as Dr. Shirmer in the episode "King of the Hill".
- Bonanza (1969–1972) as Jess Hill/Mr. Goodman (2 episodes)
- Columbo (1971) as 2nd Detective in episode "Lady in Waiting"
- Nichols (1971–1972) 5 episodes as Thatcher
- The Partridge Family (1972) 1 episode as Thompson
- The Rookies (1973) Season 2, episode 7 as Maître D'
- The Streets of San Francisco (1973–1974) as the coroner
- Barnaby Jones (1973–1976) 4 episodes
  - Perchance to Kill (1973) as J.I. Fletcher
  - Blind Terror (1973) as Mr. Strather
  - Dead Man's Run (1974) as Mr. Moore
  - Wipeout (1976) as Sheriff Safian
- Little House on the Prairie (1974–1983) as Nels Oleson
- The Harvey Korman Show (1978) as the Judge
- Hill Street Blues (1985) as Capt. Furillo's father
- Highway to Heaven (1985, 1988) (3 episodes)
  - Thoroughbreds: Part 1 (1985) as Doctor
  - Thoroughbreds: Part 2 (1985) as Doctor
  - A Mother's Love (1988) as Judge Wagner
- It's Garry Shandling's Show as Stanley (1 episode)
- Designing Women (1988) as Everett
- ER (1999) as nice man on the train (1 episode)
- Normal (2003, TV Movie) as Roy Sr.
- Boss (2011) as Elderly Farmer (final appearance)
