= Allison Balson =

American actress, singer, and songwriter, radio host and producer

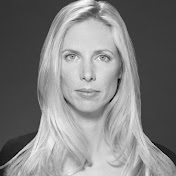
- Occupations: Actress, singer, songwriter
- Years active: 1978–present (actress); 2013–present (singer-songwriter)

Allison Balson is an American singer-songwriter and actress. Her best-known role was that of Nancy Oleson on the Little House on the Prairie series which she portrayed from 1981 to 1983.

== Biography ==
Balson portrayed the adopted Nancy Oleson on the TV drama Little House on the Prairie (1981) and Little House: A New Beginning (1982-1983). Prior she worked as a guest star in numerous syndicated television shows, such as Quincy, M.E. and CHiPs, after school specials, national commercial advertising campaigns, such as Coca-Cola, M&M's, KFC, Vivitar Camera, Minute Maid Orange Juice, and portrayed Chrissy Roberts in the syndicated TV sitcom The Life and Times of Eddie Roberts (1980). She also appeared in the film Best Seller (1987). Balson also portrayed Mary in the indie feature film Broken Blood (2013).

Balson hosted and produced the syndicated radio show Music Scene Live, a talk show format broadcast which featured musical artists in live performance of original music in front of a live audience. The show aired nationally on a weekly basis, and was recorded for more than three years, and featured over 250 musical artists of various musical genres.

Balson continues to act in television and film productions. She is also in the process of producing and recording her third solo album, and released the single called "My Friend" in conjunction with the celebration of the 50th Anniversary of Little House on the Prairie.

== Filmography ==
=== Film ===
Year	Title	Role	Notes
1980	The Hearse	Alice	
1980	The Goosehill Gang and the Mystery of Howling Woods	Beth	Direct to video
1980	The Goosehill Gang and the Gold Rush Treasure Map	Beth	Direct to video
1980	The Goosehill Gang and the Mystery of the Treehouse Ghost	Beth	Direct to video
1981	Looker	Daughter	
1987	Legend of the White Horse	Jewel	
1987	Best Seller	Holly Meechum	
2013	Broken Blood	Mary	

=== Television ===
Year	Title	Role	Notes
1978	A Guide for the Married Woman	Debby	TV movie
1980	The Life and Times of Eddie Roberts	Chrissy Roberts	Main role
1981	Quincy, M.E.	Megan Carmody	Episode – "Who Speaks for the Children"
1981	CHiPs	Amy	Episode – "Moonlight"
1982	Goldie & Kids: Listen to Us	Herself	TV special
1981–1983	Little House on the Prairie	Nancy Oleson	Main role
1983	Little House: Look Back to Yesterday	Nancy Oleson	TV movie
1984	Little House: The Last Farewell	Nancy Oleson	TV movie
1984	Little House: Bless All the Dear Children	Nancy Oleson	TV movie
1986	ABC Afterschool Specials	Jed's Girlfriend	Episode – "A Desperate Exit"
