= Lindsay and Sidney Greenbush =

American twin actresses

Rachel Lindsay Rene Greenbush and Sidney Robyn Danae Bush (born May 25, 1970 in Hollywood, California) are American former child actresses, best known for their combined (alternating) role as Carrie Ingalls, in the drama series Little House on the Prairie. They are identical twin sisters, born to actor Billy Green Bush and Carole Kay Greenbush. Their older brother, Clay, is also an actor.

== Careers ==
The twins played Jill Hayden in the 1973 made-for-television drama Sunshine .

From 1974 through 1982 they alternated the role of Carrie Ingalls in the television series Little House on the Prairie, although were credited as Lindsay Sidney Greenbush, with the implication that a single actor played the role. In the episode "The Godsister", first broadcast on December 18, 1978, both twins appear together when Carrie creates a make-believe friend because her family is too busy to spend time with her. The twins did not appear in the final season of the series as the plot line had Carrie's family (with the exception of sister Laura and her husband Almanzo) move away from Walnut Grove, Minnesota, the series' location.

== Post-Little House ==
In 1983, Lindsay guest starred in a Matt Houston episode as an abuse victim. Sidney starred in the film Hambone and Hillie that same year. The twins starred in commercials for, among others, Doublemint gum, Mattel Toys, and Kentucky Fried Chicken. They decided to retire from acting and continue their studies at public school, graduating from Santa Monica High in 1988.

== Personal lives ==
Sidney was married to horse breeder William "Rocky" Foster for nine years, until his death by suicide at the age of 55 in 2009.

Lindsay has been married to Daniel Sanchez since 2014. They originally met on the Little House set at Big Sky Ranch in Simi Valley (where exterior scenes were filmed) when she was a small child and he was a teenager who lived nearby. She has said Michael Landon allowed him to watch the filming at Big Sky Ranch. Decades later, they met again and married in the same spot where they first met.

== Filmography ==
Year	Title	Role	Notes
1973	Sunshine	Jill Hayden	TV movie
1974	Little House on the Prairie	Carrie Ingalls	Pilot movie
1974–1982	Little House on the Prairie	Carrie Ingalls	Season 1 - 8
1978	Little House on the Prairie	Alyssa	episode 5.06 "The Godsister"
1979	Little House Years	Carrie Ingalls	post series TV movie
1983	Hambone and Hillie	Amy McVickers	Sidney
1983	Matt Houston	Butterfly	Lindsay / episode 2.09 "Butterfly"
2001	To Tell the Truth	Herself	Sidney
2007	Weekend Today	Herself	Lindsay
