= Robert Alden =

American Congregational minister (1836-1911)

The Reverend Edwin Hyde Alden
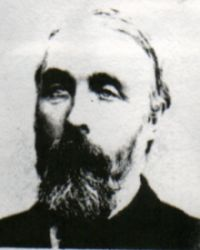
- Born: January 14, 1836; Windsor, Vermont, U.S.
- Died: May 6, 1911 (aged 75); Chester, Vermont, U.S.
- Occupation: Congregational minister
- Spouse: Twice married

Edwin Hyde "Robert" Alden (January 14, 1836 – May 6, 1911) was an American Congregational minister. He was one of the many real people upon whom Laura Ingalls Wilder based a character in the Little House on the Prairie series of books and the NBC television series of the same name.

Alden was a direct descendant of John Alden and Priscilla Mullins of the English sailing ship Mayflower.

== Life and work ==
Alden was born in Windsor, Vermont. He was the founding pastor of the First Congregational Church of Waseca, Minnesota in 1868, the first organized church in that town. Alden was later the minister at the Congregational Church in Walnut Grove, Minnesota, which was described in the book "On the Banks of Plum Creek". He was a home missionary, having a church in the East, involved in planting new churches on the western frontier, such as the one in Walnut Grove which he founded in 1875. Charles and Caroline Ingalls were among the first baptized members.

When the Ingalls family left Walnut Grove, they were convinced they would never see him again, but he unexpectedly appeared in Dakota Territory, which Laura Ingalls Wilder mentioned in "By the Shores of Silver Lake". Alden held the first church service in De Smet in February 1880, in the surveyors' house where the Ingalls family was temporarily living.

In the time between these two meetings with the Ingalls family, Alden went further north in Dakota Territory to work for the United States government as an Indian Agent at Fort Berthold. He was later accused of committing fraud while working there, and the natives he dealt with came to view him as dishonest, eventually threatening to kill him if he did not leave. The details surrounding Alden's practices, which were reported in the New York Times on August 15, 1878, state that Alden was charged with putting his wife on the agency payroll when she was still living in Minnesota. The events at Fort Berthold were reported in more detail in a Waseca, MN, newspaper on August 21, 1878.

Alden was married twice and had two children. He died in Chester, Vermont, at the age of 75.

== Television series ==
Alden was portrayed in the television series Little House on the Prairie and its movie sequels (1974–1984) by actor Dabbs Greer.

Reverend Alden is depicted as a loving, caring man who faithfully ministers the Word of God to the citizens of Walnut Grove and Hero Township, and is seen as a community leader who is looked to for his wisdom and understanding. As in real life, he has a particularly close relationship with the Ingalls family; in addition, the television series showed him to be close friends with Doctor Baker and Nels Oleson. He was frequently at odds, however, with Nels' snobbish wife, Harriet, who was a social climber and looked at others, especially the Ingalls' family, with scorn and disdain, and was upset that Alden often thwarted her plans for social climbing. Although Alden was generally patient with Mrs. Oleson, Nels and/or other members of the community frequently defended him.

Unlike most Christian teachings of the late 1800s, which emphasized fire and brimstone, Alden's teachings more closely reflected the religious teachings contemporary to the 1970s and early 1980s, the time period in which the television series was originally broadcast. However, Alden does deliver fiery sermons on occasion, as he did once (off-screen) in the episode "Fred" after he is butted by a goat while working at the church; he also gets angry and physical with a trouble-making family in "The Bully Boys."

Reverend Alden tends to be stubborn and has an ample sense of pride. The latter instance is shown in the episode "The Faith Healer," where a charismatic man claiming to have healing powers woos most of his congregation, deeply upsetting him and (temporarily) alienating Charles Ingalls when he tried to console him. When the faith healer is exposed as a fraud and the congregation returns, instead of a stern reprimand, Alden apologizes for his own stubbornness and pride.

Reverend Alden's tense relationship with Mrs. Oleson is most evident in the episode "The Preacher Takes a Wife," when Mrs. Oleson spreads scandalous gossip around town about his relationship with church parishioner Anna Craig, and later tries to contact the church synod, but when they are accepting, she is forced to relent. Anna's fate is left unclear, although she is referred to in a later episode.

In storyline terms, little was known about Alden's background until late in Season 8, when his past is finally revealed in "A Promise to Keep." In that episode, after Isaiah Edwards has lost his family due to a relapse into alcoholism, Edwards goes into the church to pray and ask for God's guidance. Alden enters the church, overhears Edwards, and eventually comforts him, revealing that he was a farmer who had his own struggles with alcohol after his entire family had died due to an illness.

Alden continued his ministries until the series' finale, "Little House: The Last Farewell," where the townspeople make a final stand against land baron Nathan Lassiter, after he was proven to hold deed to the land where Walnut Grove was located. When the townspeople blow up the town's buildings, leaving only the church and school building remaining, Lassiter realizes he'll have to rebuild everything. Leaders of other settlements say that they, too, will blow up their buildings to discourage his plans, When Lassiter walks off in defeat, Alden loudly proclaims, "Did you hear? Walnut Grove did not die in vain!"
