= Janee Michelle =

American actress and model

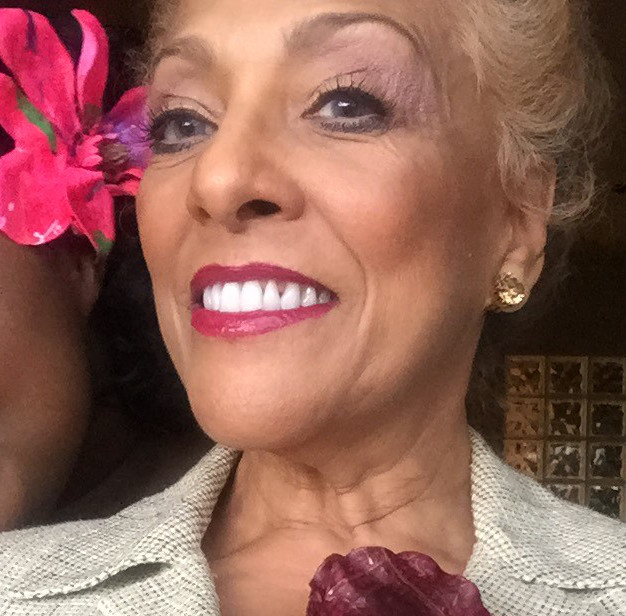
- Michelle in 2015.
- Born: Geneva Leona Mercadel; 1946 (age 79–80) (Note: The exact date of Michelle's birth is unknown, but she was born between April and June of 1946.); New Orleans, Louisiana
- Occupations: Actress; former model; business owner
- Years active: 1964–present
- Spouses: Albert Hubbard (m. 1966; div. 1968) Robert DoQui (m. 1969; div. 1978) Robert H. Tucker, Jr. (m. 1979; div. 1998)
- Children: Robert Diago DoQui (born 1971); Iam Christian Tucker (born 1983)
- Website: janeemichelle.com

Signature
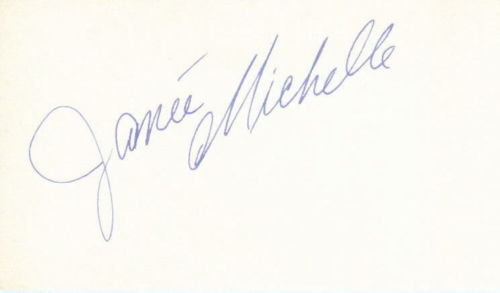

Janee Michelle (born Geneva Leona Mercadel; 1946), also known as Gee Tucker, is an American actress, former model, dancer, and businessperson, best known for her role in the 1974 horror film The House on Skull Mountain. Her acting and modeling career has included appearances in a variety of media, including films, television programs and advertisements, theatrical productions, and print advertisements. Mercadel made her first film appearance in the 1964 short film The Legend of Jimmy Blue Eyes.

She adopted the stage name Janee Michelle because her talent agent and the film studio both believed her birth name would be poorly received. Michelle's acting in the television series The Outcasts in 1968 was critically acclaimed, which led to several offers of film roles. Both in a 1969 episode of The Governor & J.J. and in the 1970 film Soul Soldier, she acted alongside her then-husband Robert DoQui.

In 1977, she was the queen in the New Orleans Mardi Gras Zulu parade. She was the first Zulu queen to wear two different gowns, both of which were designed by Bob Mackie, who had designed outfits for Cher. She divorced DoQui in 1978 and married New Orleans politician Robert H. Tucker Jr. the following year; she changed her name to Gee Tucker and became a businessperson.

In 1980, the couple founded Tucker and Associates, a management consulting company that, in 1990, received a US$26 million contract with the Strategic Petroleum Reserve, representing the largest contract that had ever been received by a minority-owned company in Louisiana. While working on this contract, Michelle and Tucker started a second company called Integrated Logistical Support.

The couple divorced and Michelle retained ownership of Tucker and Associates while Tucker retained ownership of Integrated Logistical Support. When Tucker retired in 2008, the couple's daughter Iam Tucker replaced him as president of Integrated Logistical Support. After Hurricane Katrina struck New Orleans, Michelle purchased Sophie's Gelato, an ice cream parlor on Magazine Street where she makes gelato in-house.

== Early life ==
Janee Michelle was born Geneva Leona Mercadel in New Orleans, Louisiana. Her paternal great-grandfather was a shoemaker who immigrated to New York from Champagne, France before moving to New Orleans in pursuit of a warmer climate.

Her extended family was large and had lived in the 7th Ward of New Orleans for many years. Michelle is related to Sidney Barthelemy, former mayor of New Orleans.

Traditionally, the Mercadels had worked in construction, and some of Michelle's cousins continued this tradition. Michelle's mother's surname was Mathieu and her family background included people from Africa, France, Germany, and Italy, as well as Choctaw people. She grew up in a religious home in which her father, Walter F. Mercadel, was a barber and her mother was a beautician. She had three siblings: an older brother named Walbert and two younger sisters named Zernell and Zona.

At age 13, Michelle created, produced, designed, and directed a dance show at the YWCA in New Orleans. She was named Miss New Orleans in 1960. She attended Rivers Frederick Junior High School where her principal, Leah McKenna, encouraged her to pursue a career in entertainment. While in high school, Michelle won fifteen certificates and medals for language proficiency. She started high school in New Orleans and then transferred to Manual Arts High School in Los Angeles, California, when her family moved there as a result of her mother's illness, which was aggravated by the high humidity of New Orleans.

Her father was unemployed at the time and her brother's wife was pregnant, so she started working as a cook to support the family. She graduated from Manual Arts ranked 25th scholastically in her 500-student class, and then attended Los Angeles City College and Woodbury College, receiving her best grades in English studies. She took drama courses from Actors Studio West and the Columbia Film Workshop.

== Career ==
=== Entertainment ===
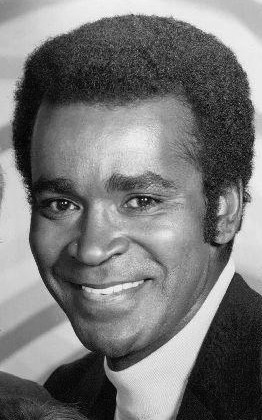
Janee Michelle appeared in an episode of Love, American Style alongside Greg Morris (pictured), known for his role in the Mission: Impossible television series.

Michelle's acting, modeling, and dancing career has included appearances in a variety of media, including films, television programs and advertisements, theatrical productions, and print advertisements. She commuted to a job as a dancer in Las Vegas while she was still in high school. She has learned to perform both ballet and Cuban dance styles and has danced at the Hollywood Palladium and Tropicana Las Vegas. As a stage actor, she appeared in productions of MacBird!, The Death of Daddy Hugs and Kisses, Ride a Wild Horse, The Vagina Monologues, In the Blink of an Eye, and other plays.

One of her early television advertisement appearances was for Ultra Sheen hair products. In 1964, Michelle—still known by her birth name Geneva Mercadel—received her first film role in the short film The Legend of Jimmy Blue Eyes, which was nominated for an Academy Award. Her contract did not allow her to receive residuals when the film later aired on television. Her talent agent and the film studio both believed her birth name would be received poorly, so she adopted the stage name Janee Michelle.

She chose the name Janee (pronounced Ja-Nay, and sometimes spelled Janée) to keep the first two syllables of her birth name. She chose the surname Michelle because she "thought it would be unique to have a name with two first names". When she found people had difficulty pronouncing the name Janee, she considered changing it again, but decided against it because she believed this pronunciation difficulty caused people to remember her.

In 1967, an article in The Chicago Defender predicted that Michelle's career in American cinema would be successful. Also that year, she appeared on the cover of an issue of the magazine Jet alongside Ronnie Eckstine in recognition of their appearance together in Eckstine's debut film The Love-Ins; it was Michelle's most prominent film role until that point. A Variety reviewer wrote that Michelle was cast well in the role. Michelle's acting in the television series The Outcasts was critically acclaimed, leading to several offers of film roles. The Outcasts reviews also led to her appearance in an episode of Love, American Style alongside Greg Morris, known for his role in the Mission: Impossible television series.

Michelle was included in the magazine Ebony's list of Fifty Eligible Girls for 1969. Also in 1969, Michelle again appeared on the cover of Jet, which called her "one of Hollywood's most attractive actresses". The article declares Michelle to be one of several up-and-coming African-American actresses, along with Gloria Foster, Gail Fisher, and Denise Nicholas. In the corresponding interview with Jet, Michelle said although racial inequality in the United States may have been a career obstacle for African-American women in the past, "that's not it today—and that's for sure". Michelle argued that her success as an actor proved the falsehood of the idea that African-American women need to have sexual intercourse with certain people to become successful in the cinema of the United States.

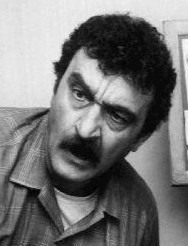
Michelle is best known for acting in the 1974 horror film The House on Skull Mountain alongside Victor French (pictured).

Michelle starred alongside her husband Robert DoQui in a 1969 episode of The Governor & J.J. The couple acted together again the following year in Soul Soldier, a film in which Michelle is the leading lady; she appears with DoQui in nude sex scenes. Michelle's and DoQui's characters form a love triangle with Lincoln Kilpatrick's character. In a New York Times review of the film, Howard Thompson called all three actors' performances "plain painful".

In 1973, Michelle collaborated with actors Judy Pace and Lillian Lehman to found Kwanza, a Hollywood, California-based nonprofit organization named after the African diaspora celebration Kwanzaa. Run entirely by African American actresses on a volunteer basis, Kwanza initially provided food to people in need at Christmas. Michelle and the other two co-founders each enlisted five other African American actresses to volunteer with the organization and, together, they raised enough funds to provide food to 75 families that first Christmas. By 1976, the organization had fed more than 2000 individuals and had expanded to function year-round.

Michelle is best known for her role in the 1974 horror film The House on Skull Mountain, which was once an obscure film but became better known when it was released on DVD. She portrays Lorena Christophe, who is summoned to the house of a recently dead distant relative who was a voodoo queen. Christophe is the love interest of the main character, who is portrayed by Victor French. In the Encyclopedia of African American Actresses in Film and Television, Bob McCann writes that Michelle "is quite pretty and gives a charming performance in her undemanding role". A Variety reviewer provided a similar appraisal of Michelle's appearance, calling her attractive and her role chic. In 2014, she appeared in a health insurance television advertisement for AARP.

=== New Orleans Mardi Gras ===
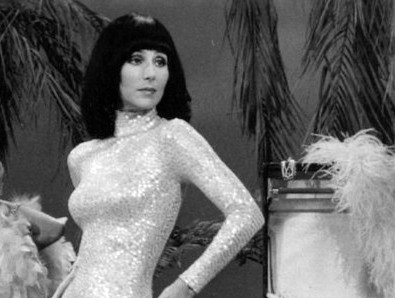
For her time as Zulu queen in the New Orleans Mardi Gras Zulu parade, Michelle borrowed a feather boa and headdress from Cher (pictured).

In 1977, Michelle's cousin, Anthony "Chuck" Mercadel, was chosen to be that year's king of the Zulu parade, part of New Orleans Mardi Gras. He and Michelle had not seen each other since before her film and television career when she was living in New Orleans. Michelle was volunteering with Kwanza in Shreveport, Louisiana with 25 other actresses, including Isabel Sanford, when Chuck and New Orleans politician Robert H. Tucker Jr. visited Michelle at her hotel. Chuck said he was looking for Sanford so he could ask her to be his queen. Michelle asked him, "Why don't you ask me to be your queen?", and he did so. Michelle refused the offer because she did not wish to be his second choice. Sanford was unable to appear in the parade due to a prior engagement and Chuck asked Michelle again. This time, she accepted, despite having to rearrange her schedule.

Until the time of the parade, Michelle was working in Hollywood. She flew to New Orleans to be ceremoniously greeted at the airport by a band and some Zulu Social Aid & Pleasure Club members. Michelle was the first Zulu queen to wear two different gowns: one for the parade and the other for the ball. Bob Mackie designed both of these gowns. Mackie had designed outfits for Cher, from whom Michelle borrowed a beige turkey feather boa and headdress for the parade. Michelle's parade gown was sleeveless, had a turtleneck, and was composed of a gold-and-cinnamon brocade decorated with topaz gemstones. The ball gown was a white, form-fitting garment with a see-through front, and was decorated with crystals and white bugle beads. She rejected the traditional tiara and instead wore a headpiece covered in pearls. Of her promenade around the ballroom, during which she swayed her shoulders and hips, Michelle later said "high-school girls were imitating it for a year after that: the 'Zulu queen' walk".

=== Business ===
After divorcing DoQui in 1978, Michelle married Robert H. Tucker Jr. the following year, changed her name to Gee Tucker, moved back to New Orleans, and became a businessperson. After Tucker had repeatedly been unsuccessful in being elected to public office, he convinced Michelle to go into business with him and stop working for Copeland. In 1980, Tucker and Michelle founded Tucker and Associates, a management consulting company.

The company did not generate much revenue at first, and Michelle worked elsewhere in management and marketing. For the first few years, Michelle and Tucker did not apply for assistance from the Small Business Administration (SBA) 8(a) Business Development Program, which offers support to businesses run by members of minority groups. Michelle said they made this decision because "we had seen other businesses start out strongly, graduate from the SBA 8-A program and fail [and] we wanted to be able to know that we could compete without it". Michelle had no formal business education, which made her feel inadequate as an entrepreneur. Of these early years in business, she later said, "I learned the hard way, on the job, things I could never have learned in school. But I think the formal training in school would have made it easier."

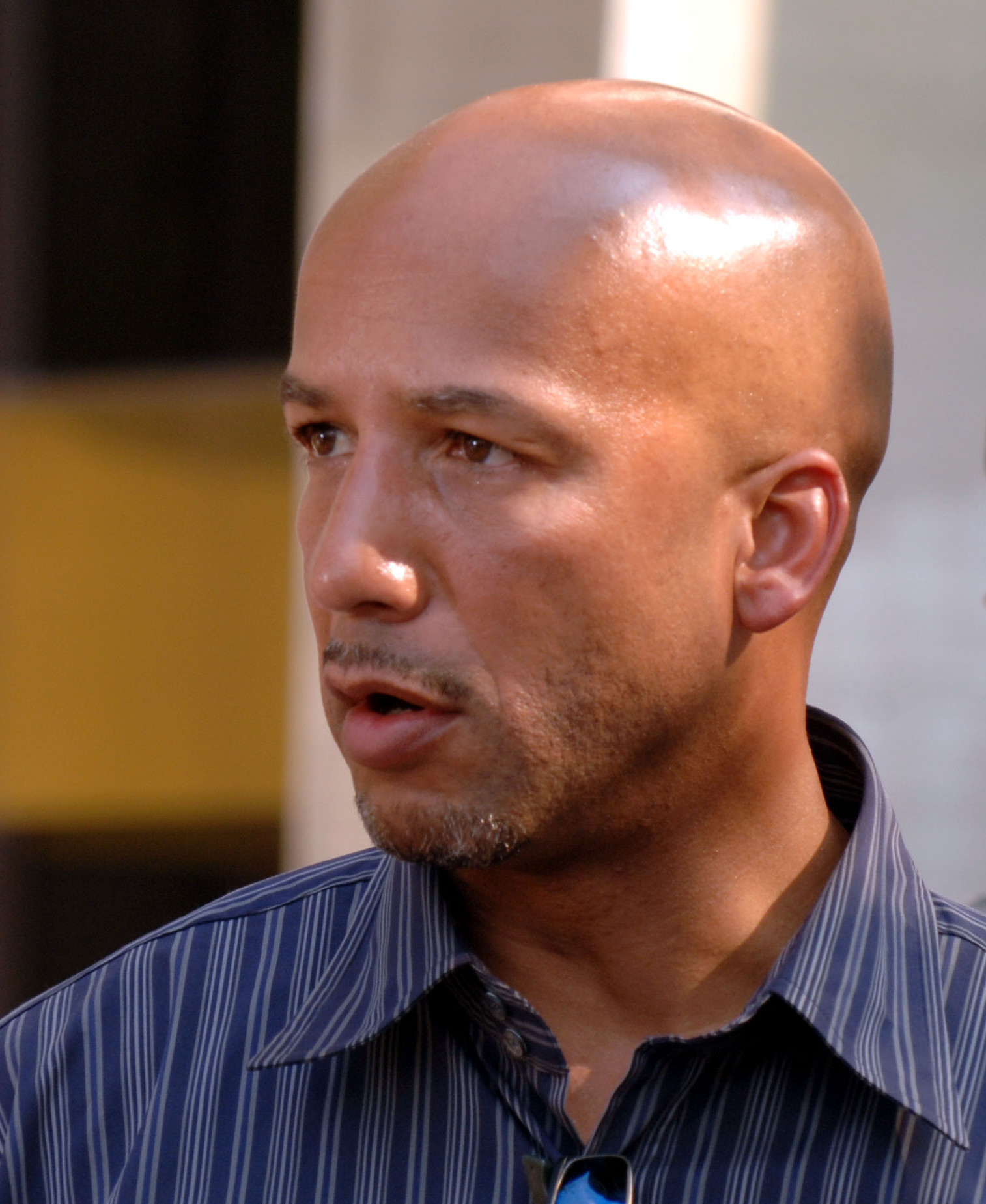
In 2003, Ray Nagin, Mayor of New Orleans, ended contracts with eleven companies that had ties to the previous mayor, including both of the companies that Michelle co-founded.

Eventually, Tucker and Associates began receiving contracts requiring a variety of services, including personnel, data processing, finance, and marketing. By 1990, the company employed 225 people and had a revenue of approximately $11 million. That year, the company received a $26 million contract with the Strategic Petroleum Reserve, representing the largest contract that had ever been received by a minority-owned company in Louisiana. This contract was awarded through the SBA 8(a) program and lasted seven years. While working on this contract, Michelle and Tucker started a second company called Integrated Logistical Support, of which Michelle became the vice president. The couple divorced before the Strategic Petroleum Reserve contract ended, and Michelle went back to using her maiden name. Michelle retained ownership of Tucker and Associates, remaining its president and chief executive officer, while Tucker retained ownership of Integrated Logistical Support.

Michelle was a director of Hibernia National Bank while it was a Forbes 500 company, and as of 2002, she is the chief operating officer of Tucker and Associates. In 2003, Ray Nagin, Mayor of New Orleans, ended contracts with eleven companies that had ties to the previous mayor, Marc Morial; both Tucker and Associates and Integrated Logistical Support were among these companies. Michelle has sat on the board of the Louisiana Children's Museum and has volunteered with the Drugs Off the Street program.

Michelle purchased Sophie's Gelato in New Orleans, which she operates.

== Awards ==
In 1991, Michelle was recognized as a YWCA Role Model. The National Council of Negro Women named her one of five community leaders of the year in 1995. Michelle has been named New Orleans Woman Business Owner of the Year and has received the Best of Black Business Award. The Business and Professional Women's Foundation has named her Employer of the Year. The American Council for Career Women has granted her their Achiever's Award.

== Personal life ==
On July 22, 1966, at the age of twenty, Michelle married 33-year-old Albert S. Hubbard in Marin County, California. They divorced in January 1968.

On April 25 of the following year, she married 35-year-old Robert DoQui in San Francisco. DoQui, whose term of endearment for Michelle was "crazy Creole chick", already had four children from a previous marriage to a woman who had died, and Michelle developed a relationship with these children, who were aged five, six, eight, and eleven. In a 1969 interview with the magazine Tan, Michelle indicated that DoQui's fashion preferences were an important factor in her clothing purchase decisions, saying, "I think a girl should dress for her husband". She also expressed her support for the breadwinner model in which men are expected to make the most income for their families and women are expected to be housewives, although Michelle argued that women should work outside the home if they want to. She went on to say that women no longer worked hard enough to retain the respect and love of their husbands, and the interviewer describes Michelle as following her own advice: "She dotes so much on her man, invests so much of herself in him, his well-being". Michelle gave birth to a son, Robert Diago DoQui, in 1971, and he later became an actor and writer. Michelle and DoQui divorced in June 1978.

Having met Robert Tucker when her cousin Chuck asked her to appear in the 1977 Zulu parade, Michelle eventually started dating Tucker and they married in 1979. Their daughter, Iam Christian Tucker, was born in 1983. Michelle and Tucker divorced after nineteen years of marriage.

== Filmography ==
=== Film ===
Title	Year	Role	Notes	Ref(s)
The Legend of Jimmy Blue Eyes	1964	Club Patron	Michelle had a non-speaking role in this Golden Globe Award-winning short film.	
Clarence, the Cross-Eyed Lion	1965	Girl in Pit		
The Love-Ins	1967	Lamelle		
Soul Soldier	1970	Julie Brown	Michelle is the leading lady in this film and shares nude sex scenes with Robert DoQui.	
The Mephisto Waltz	1970	Agency Chief's Girlfriend		
Scream Blacula Scream	1973	Gloria	This film is the sequel to Blacula.	
The House on Skull Mountain	1974	Lorena Christophe	This role is the one for which Michelle is best known.	

=== Television ===
Title	Episode	Year	Role	Notes	Ref(s)
Mr. Novak					
The Outcasts	"My Name is Jemal"	1968	Michelle	The reception of Michelle's acting in this episode led to several film role offers.	
Julia	"The Champ is No Chump"	1968	Marva Le Bouse		
Ironside	"Due Process of the Law"	1968	Helen Tobin		
The Governor & J.J.	"Rhyme with Reason"	1969		Michelle starred in this episode with Robert DoQui.	
Love, American Style	"Love and the Uncoupled Couple"	1970	Dessie Smith	Michelle starred in this episode with Greg Morris.	
The F.B.I.	"The Architect"	1970	Mary Borden	Michelle starred in this episode with Billy Dee Williams.	
Bewitched	"Sisters at Heart"	1970	Dorothy Wilson		
Sanford and Son	"Tower Power"	1974	Sandra		
In the Heat of the Night	"A Necessary Evil"	1988	Arlene Jeffson		
Star-Crossed	"An Old Accustom'd Feast"	2014	Vendor		

== Bibliography ==
- Berry, Torriano S.; Venise T. Berry (2009). The A to Z of African American Cinema. Rowman & Littlefield. ISBN 978-0810870345.
- Cowie, Peter (1977). World Filmography: 1967. Fairleigh Dickinson University Press. ISBN 0498015653.
- McCann, Bob (2009). Encyclopedia of African American Actresses in Film and Television. McFarland & Company. ISBN 978-0786458042.
- Miller, Steve (2010). 150 Movies You Should Die Before You See. F+W. ISBN 978-1440509032.
- Moore, Dorothy P.; E. Holly Buttner (1997). Women Entrepreneurs: Moving Beyond the Glass Ceiling. SAGE Publications. ISBN 0761904646.
- Muir, John Kenneth (2002). Horror Films of the 1970s. McFarland & Company. ISBN 0786491566.
- Smart-Grosvenor, Vertamae (2011). Vibration Cooking: Or, the Travel Notes of a Geechee Girl. University of Georgia Press. ISBN 978-0820339597.
- Walker, David; Andrew J. Rausch; Chris Watson (2009). Reflections on Blaxploitation: Actors and Directors Speak. Rowman & Littlefield. ISBN 978-0810867062.
- Winter, Jessica; Lloyd Hughes; Richard Armstong; Tom Charity (2007). The Rough Guide to Film. Penguin Books. ISBN 978-1405384988.
