= Soul Soldier =

1970 film by John Cardos

- Theatrical release poster
- Directed by: John Cardos
- Written by: Marlene Weed
- Produced by: Stuart Hirschman; James M. Northern
- Starring: Robert DoQui; Isaac Fields; Barbara Hale; Rafer Johnson; Lincoln Kilpatrick; Isabel Sanford; Janee Michelle
- Cinematography: Lew Guinn
- Edited by: Lew Guinn; Morton Tubor
- Music by: Stu Phillips; Tom McIntosh
- Production company: Hirschman-Northern Productions
- Release dates: December 16, 1970 (as The Red, White, and Black); 1972 (as Soul Soldier)
- Running time: 103 minutes
- Country: United States
- Language: English

Soul Soldier (produced under the working title of Men of the Tenth, originally released as The Red, White, and Black, released on home video as Buffalo Soldier in the United States and Black Cavalry in Australia, and also called Soul Soldiers) is a 1970 American blaxploitation Western film.

== Production ==
The film was initially produced by Hirschman-Northern Productions under the working title Men of the Tenth. After it was filmed on 16 mm film and released under the title The Red, White, and Black, producer Stuart Hirschman asked John Cardos to salvage the film, and Cardos, after looking at the existing footage, insisted that the entire film needed to be reshot in 35mm film. Cardos directed the reshoot, which was entirely shot on an Arriflex 35 IIC.

=== Casting ===
Richard Dix's son Robert Dix appears in the film as a Native American warrior. Isabel Sanford portrays the character Isabel Taylor. Janee Michelle and Robert DoQui share nude sex scenes in the film. Rafer Johnson, who had won medals as a decathlete at the Olympic Games, starred in the film and intended to use all the money he earned from acting in the film to start his own film company.

The financial success of the film led to the production of several other films in the genre. When the film was released on home video, it was renamed Buffalo Soldier.

== See also ==
- List of American films of 1970

== Bibliography ==
- Albright, Brian (2008). Wild Beyond Belief!: Interviews with Exploitation Filmmakers of the 1960s and 1970s. McFarland & Company. ISBN 9780786482504.
- Clark, Randall (1995). At a Theater or Drive-in Near You: The History, Culture, and Politics of the American Exploitation Film. Taylor & Francis. ISBN 0815319517.
- Fischer, Dennis (2011). Science Fiction Film Directors, 1895-1998. McFarland & Company. ISBN 9780786485055.
- Fisher, Austin (2011). Radical Frontiers in the Spaghetti Western: Politics, Violence and Popular Italian Cinema. I.B. Tauris. ISBN 9781848855786.
- Munden, Kenneth White. The American Film Institute Catalog of Motion Pictures Produced in the United States, Part 2. University of California Press. ISBN 0520209702.
- Pitts, Michael R. (2012). Western Movies: A Guide to 5,105 Feature Films (2 ed.). McFarland & Company. ISBN 9781476600901.
- Pope, Norris (2013). Chronicle of a Camera: The Arriflex 35 in North America, 1945-1972. University Press of Mississippi. ISBN 9781617037429.
