= Sisters at Heart =

- Bewitched episode
- Lisa (left) and Tabitha (right); shown after Tabitha has cast an awry spell to mix both girls' race in response to bigotry endured by other children
- Episode no.: Season 7 Episode 13
- Directed by: William Asher
- Story by: Jefferson High School (Los Angeles) tenth grade English class
- Teleplay by: Barbara Avedon & William Asher
- Original air date: December 24, 1970
- Running time: 30 minutes

Guest appearances
- Don Marshall as Keith Wilson; Janee Michelle as Dorothy Wilson; Venetta Rogers as Lisa Wilson; Parley Baer as Mr. Brockway

Episode chronology
← Previous "Samantha's Magic Potion"	Next → "Mother-in-Law of the Year"

"Sisters at Heart" is the thirteenth episode of the seventh season, and 213th episode overall, of the American Broadcasting Company (ABC) fantasy television sitcom Bewitched. This Christmas episode aired on ABC on December 24, 1970, and again the following December.

The narrative follows Lisa Wilson (Venetta Rogers), a black girl, as she visits her friend Tabitha Stephens (Erin Murphy), a white girl. Meanwhile, Tabitha's father Darrin Stephens (Dick Sargent), who works at an advertising agency, fails to land a million-dollar account with toy company owner Mr. Brockway (Parley Baer) because Mr. Brockway is racist and incorrectly believes Darrin to be married to Lisa's mother Dorothy (Janee Michelle). In an attempt to convince Mr. Brockway to overcome his bigotry, Darrin's wife Samantha (Elizabeth Montgomery), who is a witch, casts a spell on Mr. Brockway so he sees everyone, including himself, as having black skin.

The story of "Sisters at Heart" was written by 26 African-American students from a tenth grade English class at Jefferson High School after Montgomery and her husband William Asher, the director of the episode, had the students visit the set of Bewitched. Most students at the school were unable to read, write, or comprehend at a high school level, with 44% reading at a third grade level and very few students reading at a level much higher than that. Sargent said that the students, "who might have been stuck in the ghetto for the rest of their lives, loved Bewitched, and with just a little approval and motivation, came alive on the set." Montgomery considered "Sisters at Heart" her favorite episode of the series, and said that it "was created in the true spirit of Christmas ... conceived in the image of innocence and filled with truth." The episode received the Governors Award at the 23rd Primetime Emmy Awards ceremony in 1971. Montgomery's biographer Herbie Pilato wrote that "no episode of the series more clearly represented [the] cry against prejudice" than "Sisters at Heart". Critic Walter Metz praised Asher's choice of camera angles, but denounced the episode's liberalism as excessively sentimental and simplistic.

== Plot ==
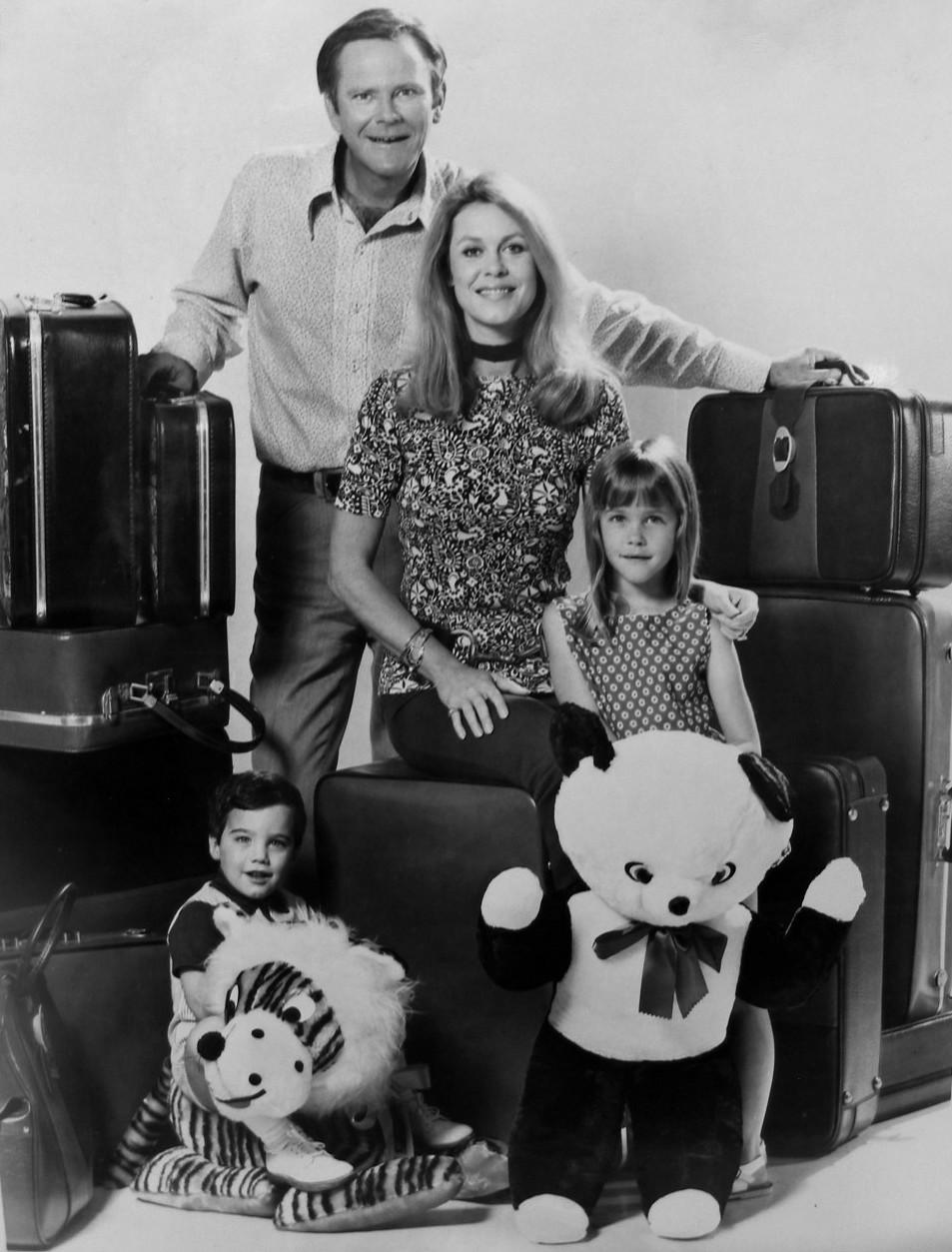
In the seventh season of Bewitched, the Stephens family is portrayed by (top to bottom) Dick Sargent, Elizabeth Montgomery, Erin Murphy, and David Lawrence.

Keith Wilson (Don Marshall), his wife Dorothy (Janee Michelle), their daughter Lisa (Venetta Rogers), and Keith's boss, Larry Tate (David White), visit the home of the Stephens family, with whom Lisa is to spend a few days while Keith is away on a business trip for Larry. The Wilsons are black, and all of the other characters are white, including the Stephens family: Darrin (Dick Sargent), his wife Samantha (Elizabeth Montgomery), their daughter Tabitha (Erin Murphy), and their son Adam (David Lawrence). Tabitha is glad to be able to spend a few days with Lisa and says they will temporarily be sisters. Darrin is another of Larry's employees at the advertising agency McMann and Tate. Darrin is trying to land a million-dollar account from Mr. Brockway (Parley Baer), who owns a toy company. Mr. Brockway visits the Stephens' residence unannounced to find out if Darrin has any dark secrets. When Mr. Brockway arrives, Samantha tends to Adam upstairs, so Lisa answers the door. When Lisa says her father works for McMann and Tate and that she is Tabitha's sister, Mr. Brockway leaves, saying he has seen enough.

Samantha takes the children to the park, where another child tells Lisa and Tabitha that they cannot be sisters because they have different skin colors. When they arrive home, Tabitha casts a spell on herself and Lisa so that Tabitha's skin has black spots and Lisa's skin has white spots. Lisa discovers that Tabitha and Samantha are witches. When Samantha finds the two girls polka-dotted, she tells Tabitha to reverse the spell, which Tabitha unsuccessfully tries to do. Eventually, Samantha realizes that Tabitha's attempt was unsuccessful because Tabitha subconsciously wants the spots to remain so she and Lisa will continue to be sisters. Samantha tells the girls that differences in appearance won't prevent them from being sisters, and Tabitha then successfully reverses the spell just as Lisa's parents arrive to pick up Lisa.

Larry tells Darrin that Mr. Brockway has insisted that Darrin be removed from the account. Darrin and Samantha host a Christmas party which Larry, Keith, and Dorothy attend. When Mr. Brockway arrives with presents for the children (a black baby doll for Lisa, a white baby doll for Tabitha, and a panda bear for Adam because he was unsure of "which side of the family he takes after"), he sees Darrin and Dorothy standing together and assumes they are married to each other. When Mr. Brockway realizes his mistake and that Darrin is instead married to Samantha, Mr. Brockway tells Larry that he is willing to allow Darrin back on the account. After discovering that Mr. Brockway was initially unwilling because he thought Darrin was married to a black woman, Larry rejects Mr. Brockway's offer. Mr. Brockway expresses disbelief that anyone would reject such a lucrative account. Through witchcraft, Samantha causes Mr. Brockway to see everyone in the room, including himself, as having black skin. On Christmas Day, while the Wilsons are visiting the Stephens, Mr. Brockway arrives, apologizes for his previous actions, and repents his racism. Samantha invites Mr. Brockway to join them for Christmas dinner ("integrated turkey"), and he accepts.

== Production ==
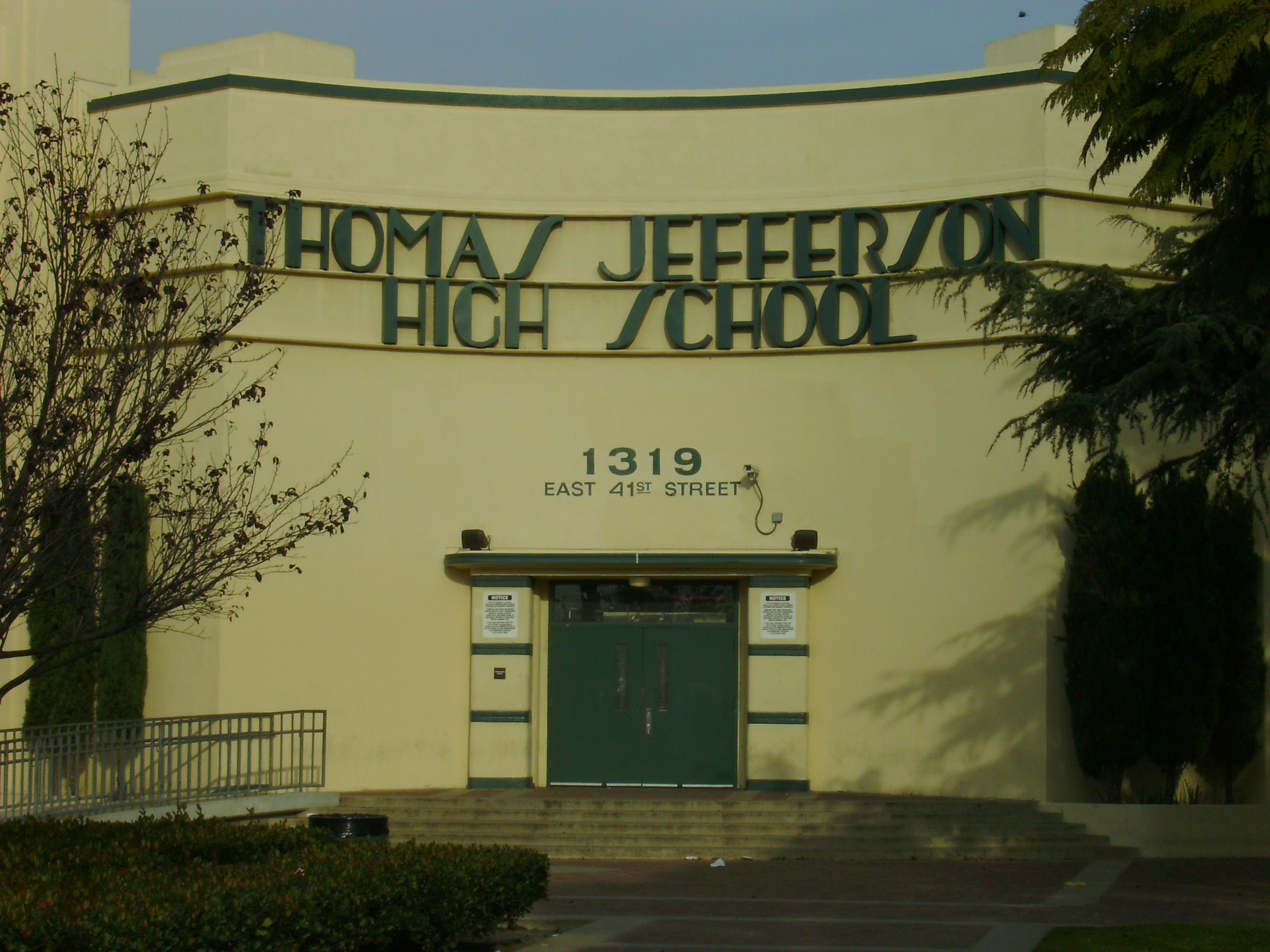
The story of "Sisters at Heart" was written by 26 African-American students from a tenth grade English class at Jefferson High School in Los Angeles.

In 1969, Marcella Saunders, a 23-year-old teacher at Jefferson High School in Los Angeles, found that her ninth-grade students were unable to read the short stories and poetry in the class textbook. She thought that, because her students were more familiar with television than poetry or short stories, she would have more success in teaching her students if she taught them by way of a television series. She found that her students liked Bewitched, Room 222, and Julia, so she contacted the corresponding television studios to tell them about her idea. Only Bewitched responded. Having gained an audience with Montgomery and her husband William Asher, Saunders told the couple that most students at the school were unable to read, write, or comprehend at a high school level, with 44% reading at a third grade level and very few students reading at a level much higher than that; less than 1% were reading at a ninth grade level. Saunders added that Bewitched was the students' favorite television series.

Out of concern for the students in Saunders' English class, Montgomery and Asher invited Saunders' class of black students to visit the set of Bewitched. (Note: There is some difference between various sources as to the actual number of students who visited the set. Elizabeth Montgomery's biographer Herbie Pilato claimed in 2012 that there were 24 students, but a Jet article contemporaneous with "Sisters at Heart" states that there were 22. The episode that was eventually completed from the students' story gave story credit to 26 students, though it is possible that not all of them made the initial visit to the Bewitched set.) Because many of these teenagers, now in the tenth grade, did not have the financial means to make their way to Hollywood, Montgomery and Asher paid for the class to be transported there and back by chartered bus. The students were impressed by the visit and later collaborated to write a teleplay for a Bewitched episode under Saunders' supervision. The teleplay was called "Sisters at Heart." At Christmas in 1969, they presented Montgomery and Asher with the teleplay, gift-wrapped. Montgomery and Asher were impressed with the quality of the script. Montgomery later said, "We've had bad scripts submitted by professional writers that weren't as well written or creative."

Unique closing credits "Story By" title cards for Sisters at Heart

Asher told Barbara Avedon about the students' script, saying that it only needed a little reworking, and he asked if she would help the students with the rewrite. Avedon, who had written for The Donna Reed Show and been a regular writer for Bewitched, accepted his request. Avedon visited Jefferson High School and later said of the experience, "I was horrified. Locker doors were hanging off their hinges. There wasn't a blade of grass in sight." Avedon expressed amazement over the script the students produced and helped them revise it and expand its length so it would sustain a full half-hour episode. She promised the students that no changes would be made to the script unless they approved. It was because of her recommendation that the story was reformulated as a Christmas episode, which she suggested because the script "was so imbued with the spirit." She said that one of the students indicated a desire to write for Bewitched because the series deals with miscegenation by way of a marriage between a witch and a mortal. The final script credited the teleplay to Avedon and Asher, and the story to all 26 students, who were listed on screen in alphabetical order.

The students attended a production and rehearsal meeting for the episode. The government of California gave Jefferson High School a grant to support a program to allow the students to be part of the filming and post-production of the episode. Film production company Screen Gems joined Montgomery and Asher in making donations to the program as well. The students donated the money they received for writing the episode to a foundation to keep the program going. Two more trips were organized, bringing a total of fifty Jefferson High School students to the set of Bewitched. Asher sent copies of thirty scripts of other Bewitched episodes to the school for use in classrooms. Saunders found the program a great success, saying "kids who could never write before were now writing three pages. Kids who could not read were now doubling up on scripts and fighting over who would be able to play the leads." Asher also expressed pleasure with the program's success, and recommended that other white businesspeople invite minority groups into their lives. Sargent considered Saunders the main reason for the success of the program, saying, "She was interested in innovative forms of teaching. These kids, who might have been stuck in the ghetto for the rest of their lives, loved Bewitched, and with just a little approval and motivation, came alive on the set."

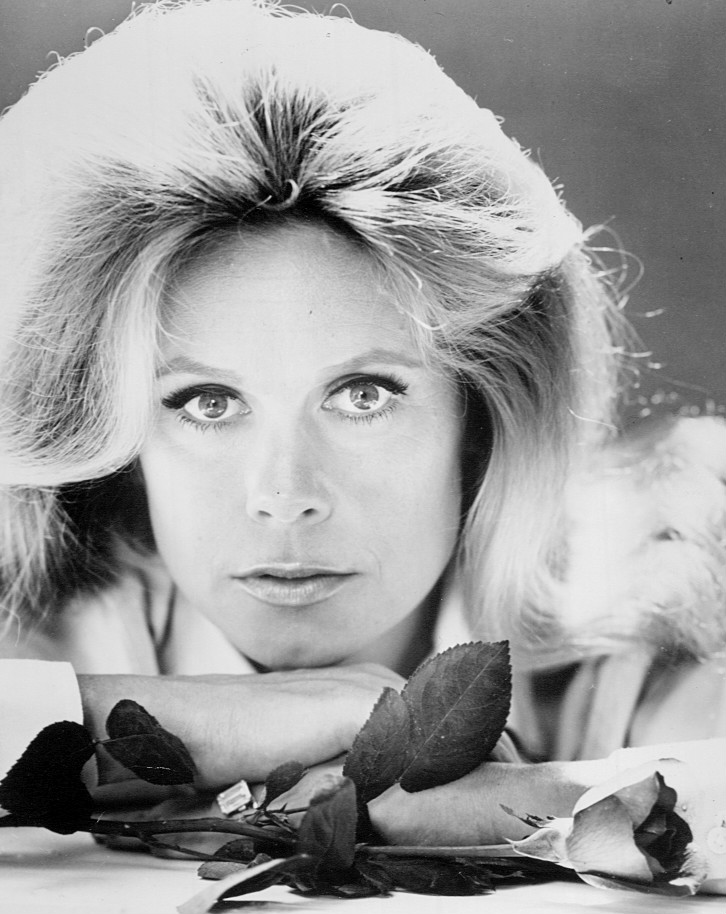
Montgomery considered "Sisters at Heart" her favorite episode of the series.

Asher produced and directed the episode. A high school student who was granted the role of assistant director at one point screamed "Quiet on the set!", a memory that Sargent later recalled fondly. For the scene in which Samantha casts a spell that makes Mr. Brockway see everyone as having black skin, the white actors, including Sargent and White, appeared in blackface. The name of Mr. Brockway's toy company is never mentioned. Samantha's statement at the end of the episode, "We're having integrated turkey: white meat and dark", was repeated in Spike Lee's 1986 film She's Gotta Have It. The final shot of the episode, which zooms out from the scene of Samantha and Darrin kissing to reveal the French doors at the back of their house as "Silent Night" plays in the background, is the only shot in any episode of Bewitched to depict the interior of the house from the perspective of the backyard. "Sisters at Heart" is the only episode of the series in which Lisa appears. Seven years before acting together in "Sisters at Heart", Montgomery and Baer appeared together in an episode of the CBS television series Rawhide called "Incident at El Crucero", which aired when the pilot episode of Bewitched was in pre-production. In 1970, Montgomery appeared on The Merv Griffin Show to promote "Sisters at Heart", thereby making one of the only three talk show appearances of her career. After Griffin left the network, CBS wiped all episodes of The Merv Griffin Show produced between 1969 and 1972, but a copy of the episode featuring Montgomery's promotion of "Sisters at Heart" was later discovered when it became known that relevant kinescopes and master tapes had survived.

Endorsed by meat production company Oscar Mayer, "Sisters at Heart" is a half-hour, color episode that aired on December 24, 1970, as the 213th episode of Bewitched to be aired. As an introduction and conclusion to the episode, Montgomery briefly spoke to the camera about the episode, saying that it "was created in the true spirit of Christmas ... conceived in the image of innocence and filled with truth." ABC aired the episode only once more, in December 1971. Unlike many of the other episodes in the season, it was neither a remake of an episode from a previous season nor part of the Salem, Massachusetts, story arc that was filmed in the area where the 17th-century Salem witch trials took place. Don Marshall, who made a guest appearance in "Sisters at Heart" as Keith Wilson, was known for his role in Land of the Giants, while Janee Michelle, who portrayed Dorothy Wilson in "Sisters at Heart", later became best known for her role in the 1974 horror film The House on Skull Mountain. "Sisters at Heart" was Montgomery's favorite episode of the series. Reflecting on the episode in 1989, she said, "Yeah, this is what I want Bewitched to be all about." Sony Pictures Home Entertainment eventually released the episode on a VHS collection called A Bewitched Christmas 2. On June 16, 2005, the episode was screened in Salem as the first entry in "The Art and Politics of Elizabeth Montgomery", a film-watching and discussion group that met at First Church in Salem.

== Reception ==
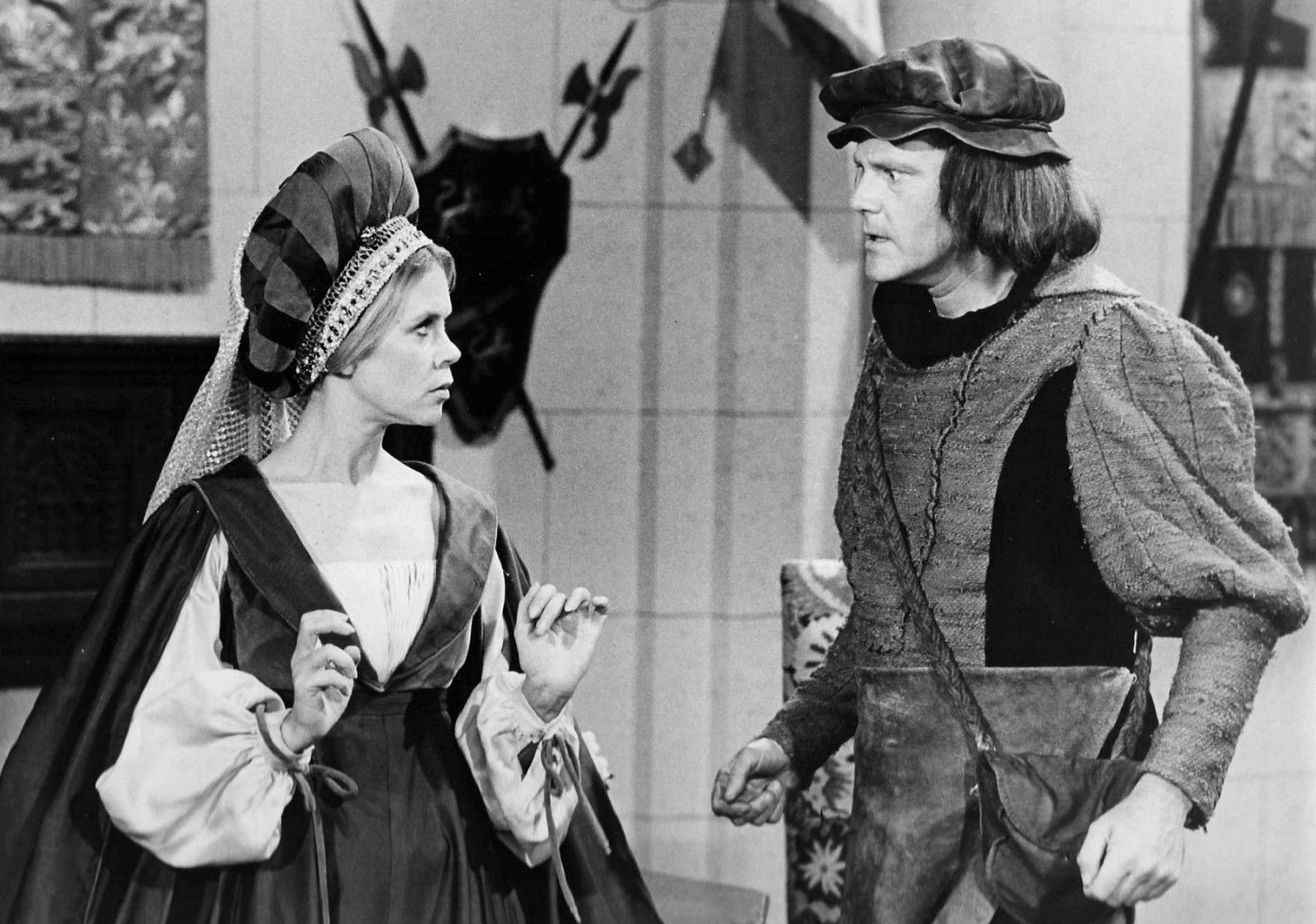
Herbie Pilato wrote that the theme of overcoming prejudice is central to Bewitched because it focuses on the marriage between a witch and a mortal, Samantha and Darrin Stephens (pictured in the Bewitched episode "How Not to Lose Your Head to King Henry VIII").

"Sisters at Heart" received the Governors Award at the 23rd Primetime Emmy Awards ceremony in 1971. Montgomery's biographer Herbie Pilato wrote that the theme of overcoming prejudice is central to Bewitched because of the prominence of the marriage between a witch and a mortal, and that "no episode of the series more clearly represented this cry against prejudice than the holiday story, 'Sisters at Heart.'" A reviewer from the Australian newspaper the Daily Liberal wrote that "Sisters at Heart" is "very thoughtful" and argued that it is the sole episode of the series that is not simply a "lightweight offering" reflective of "the United States' post-war society of new consumerism and advertising." When the seventh season of Bewitched was released on DVD in 2009, DVD Talk reviewer Paul Mavis wrote that "Sisters at Heart" has a more overt message than any other episode of the season. He praised the actors' performances in the episode and wrote that, because of the episode's obvious-yet-effective critique of racism, "what's highly ironic about Sisters at Heart today is that it would most likely be dubbed politically incorrect and 'insensitive' by some because the cast wear blackface at one point."

Hal Erickson of AllMovie called the episode "refreshingly free of the patronization which usually attended 'racially sensitive' TV episodes of the period." In his book about Bewitched, critic Walter Metz writes that "Sisters at Heart" exemplifies the liberalism endorsed by the series, which he argues is excessively sentimental and simplistic. He praises Asher for his "skillful understanding of film aesthetics", calling particular attention to Asher's choice of camera angles in the scene in which Mr. Brockway first meets Lisa. Metz argues that the Stephens' foyer is an important location in the series, and that this importance is exemplified in the episode both by the scene of Mr. Brockway's first encounter with Lisa as well as in the epilogue when Mr. Brockway revisits the house and apologizes for his prior racism. Metz criticizes Mr. Brockway's "magically found soft-heartedness" as a "paternalistic approach to liberal racial tolerance [that] implies that only white patriarchs have the cultural authority to declare that racism is wrong." Metz further argues that the episode problematically figures Samantha as the protector and provider for black people, a role that he says Samantha also fills in "Samantha at the Keyboard", another Bewitched episode.
