= Mr. Edwards =

Character in the Little House on the Prairie series

Mr. Edwards is a character that appeared in the Little House series of autobiographical children's novels written by Laura Ingalls Wilder. His character was later adapted for the NBC television show, Little House on the Prairie and given the name "Isaiah Edwards."

As stated by Wilder in her books, Mr. Edwards was "the wildcat from Tennessee" whom the Ingalls met during their stay near Independence, Kansas, in the Little House on the Prairie novel. They met for a short while also in By the Shores of Silver Lake, when Mr. Edwards helps Pa file his claim during a sudden settlement rush, and in The Long Winter, when he generously gives the now-blind Mary a $20 bill.

== Historical influences ==
It remains unknown whether Mr. Edwards was a completely fictional person or if his story was based on some authentic events and people from Laura's life. Many researchers of the "Little House" books believe that Edwards was actually a composite of people who did kind deeds for the Ingalls throughout the years.

In her earliest memoir Pioneer Girl, Wilder recalled the name of the neighbor who swam a creek near their house to bring her and sister Mary Christmas presents as "Mr. Brown," a deed that she ascribed to Mr. Edwards in Little House on the Prairie. An Alabama native and 35-year-old bachelor named Fred Brown is listed as a resident of Rutland Twp Montgomery Co. KS in the 1870 US Census, the same township where the Ingalls family lived in 1870. Possibly this Fred Brown was the model for Mr. Edwards. However, Pamela Smith Hill, the editor of Pioneer Girl suggested that Mr. Edwards may have been the 25-year old English native named Edmund Mason who is also enumerated as a bachelor neighbor of the Ingalls in Rutland Co. Montgomery Co KS. Mason's grave may be found in the local Harrison Cemetery, near where the Ingalls were living in the book Little House on the Prairie, though certain key aspects of Mason's known life are at odds with the information about "Mr. Edwards" supplied by Laura in her novels.

== In the media ==
=== Little House on the Prairie series ===
Isaiah Edwards
- Little House on the Prairie character
- Portrayed by: Victor French
- First appearance: The Pilot Movie
- Last appearance: Little House: The Last Farewell
In-universe information
- Spouse: 1st - Unknown; 2nd - Grace Snider
- Children: with 1st Wife - Alice Edwards; Adopted with Grace Snider - John Jr., Carl and Alicia Sanderson

The character of Isaiah Edwards was introduced in the pilot movie, which established the Ingalls family settling on a prairie tract in Kansas. Victor French, a close friend of series creator Michael Landon and a character actor who had acted in several television westerns beforehand, portrayed the role throughout most of the series run.

A poorly educated, gruff-looking dirt farmer, Mr. Edwards helps the Ingalls family build their new home on the prairie and deal with the hardships that arise. It is during this time that the series' main protagonist, Laura Ingalls, develops a close relationship with Edwards. Laura's mother, Caroline, distrusts Mr. Edwards at first, finding his mannerisms and rough demeanor uncouth, but in time grows to respect and accept him as one of the family. Edwards and the Ingalls family are separated when they are forced to leave their property by the government.

When Little House on the Prairie was picked up as a weekly television series, Victor French returned to the role. In the time between the pilot movie and his first episode, "Mr. Edwards' Homecoming," Mr. Edwards had become a drunken drifter, and eventually arrives in Mankato, Minnesota. There, he gets into a barroom brawl when by chance Charles Ingalls – who was making a delivery run from Walnut Grove, where the Ingalls family had settled – arrives and (upon hearing the commotion and recognizing Mr. Edwards) comes to his defense. Mr. Edwards is brought to the Ingalls' new home near Walnut Grove, and eventually gets a place of his own. It is about this time he reveals his past: He became an alcoholic after his first wife and young daughter died of Mountain Fever, and renounced his Christian faith as a result. For the most part, Mr. Edwards is able to keep his drinking under control in episodes that aired during the first three seasons. Mr. Edwards frequently sang the song, "Old Dan Tucker" and a musical cue sometimes introduced his character.

Mr. Edwards eventually meets Grace Snider; the two fall in love and are married. They adopt three children orphaned when their mother dies of an illness: John Jr., Carl and Alicia Sanderson. The family remains a part of the cast until the end of the third season, when Mr. Edwards uses a gold claim to begin a logging empire (the storyline was created after Victor French took the lead role in another series, "Carter Country"). French reprised his role in a Season 6 episode, "The Return of Mr. Edwards", where he is seriously injured by a falling tree and becomes suicidal. Charles and Laura arrive to help Mr. Edwards out of his depression.

With French's return to the show during Season 8, a story arc was developed around the death of Mr. Edwards' eldest son, John Jr., and the consequences that result. John Jr., who had become an investigative reporter for a Chicago newspaper, was murdered by a corrupt businessman who didn't want his activities becoming public. Mr. Edwards is initially told that it was a street accident that killed John Jr., but as Charles helps him grieve, the two – along with the editor and a street urchin – uncover the truth. It is John Jr.'s death that causes Mr. Edwards to relapse into deep alcoholism, causing him to presumably lose his logging business and eventually, his family. Distraught, Mr. Edwards returns to Walnut Grove, keeping his dark secrets under wraps until he causes a street accident that seriously injures Albert Ingalls (Charles' adopted son). Charles breaks off his friendship with Mr. Edwards and tells him to leave and never return, leaving Laura as his only hope. Laura and her husband, Almanzo, agree to help reform Mr. Edwards, and it works until he gets a letter from Grace telling him she has filed divorce papers. Mr. Edwards tries to break into the Oleson Mercantile to obtain alcohol, but when it is locked up, he sees the church and goes in to pray and seek God's forgiveness and guidance. He subsequently reconciles with Charles and eventually becomes Rose Wilder's godfather.

During the final season, Mr. Edwards was featured in several episodes, primarily as a comic foil to Harriet Oleson, the snobbish wife of mercantile owner Nels Oleson. However, there were a few serious episodes featuring the character, most notably the two-part episode "The Wild Boy," where he agrees to adopt a mute boy who had been abused by a traveling showman. He also plays key roles in the TV films that aired in 1983 and 1984, most notably "Bless All the Dear Children."

=== Little House on the Prairie mini-series (2005) ===
The character was played by Gregory Sporleder.
