= Two Lost Worlds =

1950 film by Norman Dawn

- Theatrical poster
- Directed by: Norman Dawn
- Written by: Tom Hubbard; Phyllis Parker; Boris Petroff (story); Bill Shaw
- Produced by: Boris Petroff
- Starring: James Arness; Kasey Rogers
- Cinematography: Harry Neumann
- Edited by: Fred R. Feitshans Jr.
- Music by: Alex Alexander
- Distributed by: Sterling Productions Inc. Eagle-Lion films
- Release date: January 5, 1951
- Running time: 61 minutes
- Language: English

Two Lost Worlds is a 1951 science fiction/adventure film directed by Norman Dawn and starring James Arness and Kasey Rogers. The film was produced independently by Boris Petroff, who wrote the original story, which was adapted by Phyllis Parker and Tom Hubbard into a screenplay written by Hubbard. The film was distributed by Eagle-Lion Films.

== Plot ==
On August 16, 1830, the American clipper ship Hamilton Queen sails from Salem bound for the East Indies. The ship is attacked by pirates in the New Hebrides and the ship's mate Kirk Hamilton is wounded in the leg. The clipper outruns the pirate ship and Captain Tallman heads to Queensland, Australia so that Kirk can receive medical treatment.

While convalescing, Kirk meets and falls in love with Elaine Jeffries, the fiancée of rancher Martin Shannon. A romantic rivalry develops, and the pirates who attacked Kirk and his ship kidnap Elaine, along with her friend, Nancy Holden. Kirk and Shannon pursue the pirates and find themselves on a volcanic island inhabited by dinosaurs. After a short time on the island, they are forced to leave as the volcano erupts. During the disaster, Nancy is killed by an avalanche.

== Cast ==
- Kasey Rogers as Elaine Jeffries (as Laura Elliott)
- James Arness as Kirk Hamilton (as Jim Aurness)
- Bill Kennedy as Martin Shannon
- Gloria Petroff as Janice Jeffries
- Pierre Watkin as Magistrate Jeffries
- Tom Hubbard as John Hartley
- Jane Harlan as Nancy Holden
- Tom Monroe as Captain Tallman
- Michael Rye as Captain Hackett
- Fred Kohler, Jr. as Nat Mercer

== Production ==
The film contains no original dinosaur effects; the dinosaur scenes were culled from stock footage created for the film One Million B.C. (1940).

The film was shot in Red Rock Canyon State Park.

== See also ==
- 1951 in film
- List of films featuring dinosaurs
