= List of Bewitched characters =

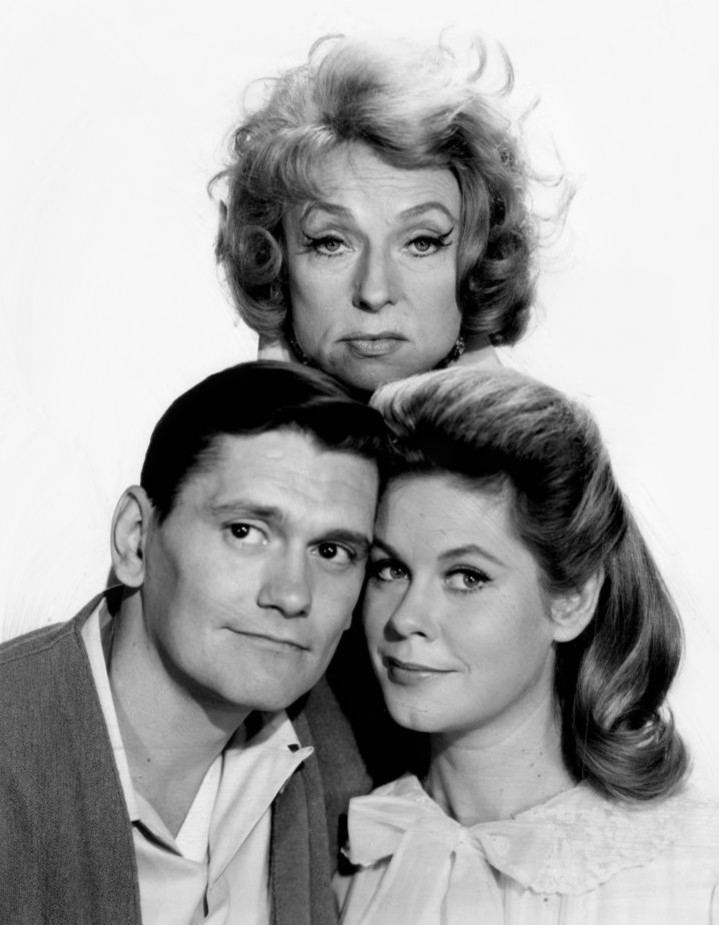
Agnes Moorehead as Endora, Dick York as Darrin Stephens and Elizabeth Montgomery as Samantha

This is a list of characters in Bewitched, an American fantasy television sitcom which aired from 1964 to 1972.

== Cast ==
=== Main ===
Character	Portrayed by	Seasons							
Character	Portrayed by	1	2	3	4	5	6	7	8
Samantha Stephens	Elizabeth Montgomery	Main	Main	Main	Main	Main	Main	Main	Main
Darrin Stephens	Dick York	Main	Main	Main	Main	Main	—N/a	—N/a	—N/a
Darrin Stephens	Dick Sargent	—N/a	—N/a	—N/a	—N/a	—N/a	Main	Main	Main
Endora	Agnes Moorehead	Main	Main	Main	Main	Main	Main	Main	Main
Larry Tate	David White	Recurring	Recurring	Recurring	Recurring	Recurring	Main	Main	Main

=== Recurring ===
Character	Portrayed by	Seasons							
Character	Portrayed by	1	2	3	4	5	6	7	8
Tabitha Stephens	Cynthia Black, Heidi and Laura Gentry, Julie and Tamar Young (Note: The two sets of twins and one non-twin who portrayed Tabitha in season 2 were not credited onscreen.)	—N/a	Recurring	—N/a	—N/a	—N/a	—N/a	—N/a	—N/a
Tabitha Stephens	Erin and Diane Murphy (Note: While both twins appeared as Tabitha in seasons 3 and 4, only Erin Murphy was credited onscreen. Diane Murphy appeared in one solo episode in season 5 in which she received onscreen credit, which was her last appearance as Tabitha.)	—N/a	—N/a	Recurring	Recurring	Recurring	Recurring	Recurring	Recurring
Gladys Kravitz	Alice Pearce	Recurring	Recurring	—N/a	—N/a	—N/a	—N/a	—N/a	—N/a
Gladys Kravitz	Sandra Gould	—N/a	—N/a	Recurring	Recurring	Recurring	Recurring	Recurring	—N/a
Abner Kravitz	George Tobias	Recurring	Recurring	Recurring	Recurring	Recurring	Recurring	Recurring	—N/a
Louise Tate	Irene Vernon	Recurring	Recurring	—N/a	—N/a	—N/a	—N/a	—N/a	—N/a
Louise Tate	Kasey Rogers	—N/a	—N/a	Recurring	Recurring	Recurring	Recurring	Recurring	Recurring
Aunt Clara	Marion Lorne	Recurring	Recurring	Recurring	Recurring	—N/a	—N/a	—N/a	—N/a
Serena	Elizabeth Montgomery	—N/a	Guest	—N/a	Recurring	Recurring	Recurring	Recurring	Recurring
Adam Stephens	unknown	—N/a	—N/a	—N/a	—N/a	—N/a	Recurring	—N/a	—N/a
Adam Stephens	David and Greg Lawrence	—N/a	—N/a	—N/a	—N/a	—N/a	—N/a	Recurring	Recurring
Phyllis Stephens	Mabel Albertson	Recurring	Recurring	Guest	Recurring	Recurring	Recurring	Recurring	—N/a
Dr. Bombay	Bernard Fox	—N/a	—N/a	Guest	Recurring	Recurring	Recurring	Recurring	Recurring
Esmeralda	Alice Ghostley	—N/a	—N/a	—N/a	—N/a	—N/a	Recurring	Recurring	Recurring
Frank Stephens	Robert F. Simon	Recurring	Recurring	Guest	—N/a	—N/a	—N/a	Guest	—N/a
Frank Stephens	Roy Roberts	—N/a	—N/a	—N/a	Recurring	Recurring	Recurring	—N/a	—N/a
Maurice	Maurice Evans	Guest	Guest	Guest	—N/a	Recurring	Recurring	—N/a	Recurring
Uncle Arthur	Paul Lynde	—N/a	Guest	Recurring	Guest	Recurring	Recurring	Guest	—N/a

Cast notes:

== Main characters ==
=== Samantha Stephens ===
Samantha Stephens (Elizabeth Montgomery) is a good witch and the show's protagonist. She is married to a mortal named Darrin Stephens and has two children by him. The daughter, Tabitha is magical. The son, Adam, is magical as well, as demonstrated in "Adam, Warlock or Washout" (Season 8, Episode 14) Samantha often has difficulty adjusting to mortal life, even though she is trying to give up using her powers. She is perhaps the most sensible character in the show; she enjoys her mother's company and is able to take her jabs at mortal life with ease. She is optimistic and treats everyone with respect, be they magical creatures, powerful witches and warlocks, or ordinary people.

=== Darrin Stephens ===
Darrin Stephens, son of Frank and Phyllis Stephens, (originally Dick York, seasons 1–5; later Dick Sargent, seasons 6–8) is a mortal married to Samantha. He did not know she was a witch until she told him after they got married, and tries to dissuade her from using witchcraft as much as possible, preferring to live an ordinary, mortal life. He works as a Vice President/Account Executive at the McMann & Tate Advertising agency. Dick York was unable to continue his role as Darrin because of a severe back condition, the result of an accident during the filming of They Came to Cordura in 1959. Starting during the third season, York's disability caused ongoing shooting delays and script rewrites. After collapsing while filming the episode "Daddy Does His Thing" and being rushed to the hospital in January 1969, York left the show. Dick Sargent was cast for the role that same month, and went on to play Darrin in the sixth through eighth seasons.

=== Endora ===
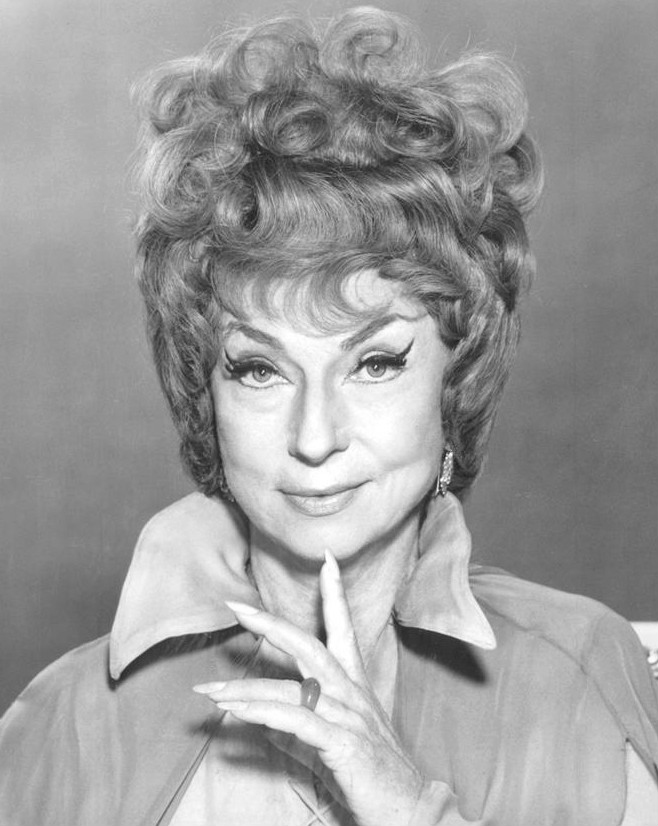
Agnes Moorehead as Endora

Endora (Agnes Moorehead) is Samantha's mother and Darrin's chief antagonist in the series. Though the credit "And Agnes Moorehead as Endora" appears in the opening credits of every episode, the character typically only appears in about half to two-thirds of the episodes of any given season.

Like all witches, Endora never reveals her surname, indicating to Darrin that he would be unable to pronounce it. However, the name she uses might be related to the Biblical Witch of Endor. Endora finds mortals dull and disapproves of Darrin, as do many of Samantha's relatives. Endora refuses even to speak Darrin's name correctly, alternately calling him "Derwood", "What's-his-name", "Darwin", "Dum-Dum", etc., all much to his annoyance. She refers to him as "Darrin" only eight times during the entire series. Endora's ploys to provoke a breakup always fail, as Samantha's and Darrin's love overcomes every obstacle. Even though Endora casts countless farcical spells on Darrin, she never attempts to destroy him outright. During the first season, Endora threatens her warlock husband Maurice, after he destroys Darrin, saying that she will not have a human being on her conscience. It was one of the few times when Endora went out of her way to protect Darrin from Maurice (see episode 1.10). Endora once let Maurice kiss her. But when she realizes that, after he has kissed her and disappeared, she has contracted an illness which leaves her unable to use her powers, she is furious—until Maurice returns to gives her an antidote, and take her to "the place we used to go to on the Milky Way" to have dinner. As the series continued, Endora and Maurice's hostility to Darrin mellows to a grudging tolerance.

She does not get along with Darrin's mother, Phyllis Stephens, because she gets along too well with Phyllis's husband, Frank. But they are civil to one another in what Samantha calls "killing one another with kindness". Endora does dote on her grandchildren, Tabitha and Adam; they call her "Grandmama".

Numerous references imply that Endora is hundreds of years old. It is noted at one point (see episode 8.02) that she was "not even born yet" in the 16th century, as an explanation for why her witchcraft did not work when she went back to the time of Henry VIII; however, a few episodes later (see episode 8.06) she states that she was there when the cornerstone was laid at the Louvre 900 years previously. (As witches are capable of time travel, however, this is not necessarily a continuity error.)

=== Larry Tate ===
Larry Tate (David White) is Darrin's profit-obsessed boss and friend. Tate is a regular character, appearing in about half to three-quarters of the episodes of any given season. Tate's opinions turn on a dime to appease a client in an attempt to land a deal. However, there are three episodes which show evidence that Larry has deep feelings as well as having a sense of integrity. In the first season installment, "And Something Makes Three", Larry realizes he is to become a father for the first time and is almost overcome with joyful emotion. In the second-season episode, "The Magic Cabin", he sells his run-down cabin to a newlywed couple for only the price of its down payment, one fifth of his original asking price, to which they had agreed. In the seventh season Christmas episode "Sisters at Heart", Larry turns down work from a potential important client when he realizes the client is a racist.

== Supporting characters ==
=== Louise Tate ===
Louise Tate (Irene Vernon, later Kasey Rogers) is Larry's wife and Samantha's closest mortal friend. Louise Tate was played by Irene Vernon during the first two seasons and then replaced by Kasey Rogers, who wore a short black wig to appear similar to Vernon. According to Rogers, Bill Asher noticed her tugging at the wig and asked why she was wearing it. She laughed and said, "because you told me to." He replied, "Why don't you take it off?" and she did, playing Louise with red hair for the show's final three seasons.

=== Gladys Kravitz ===
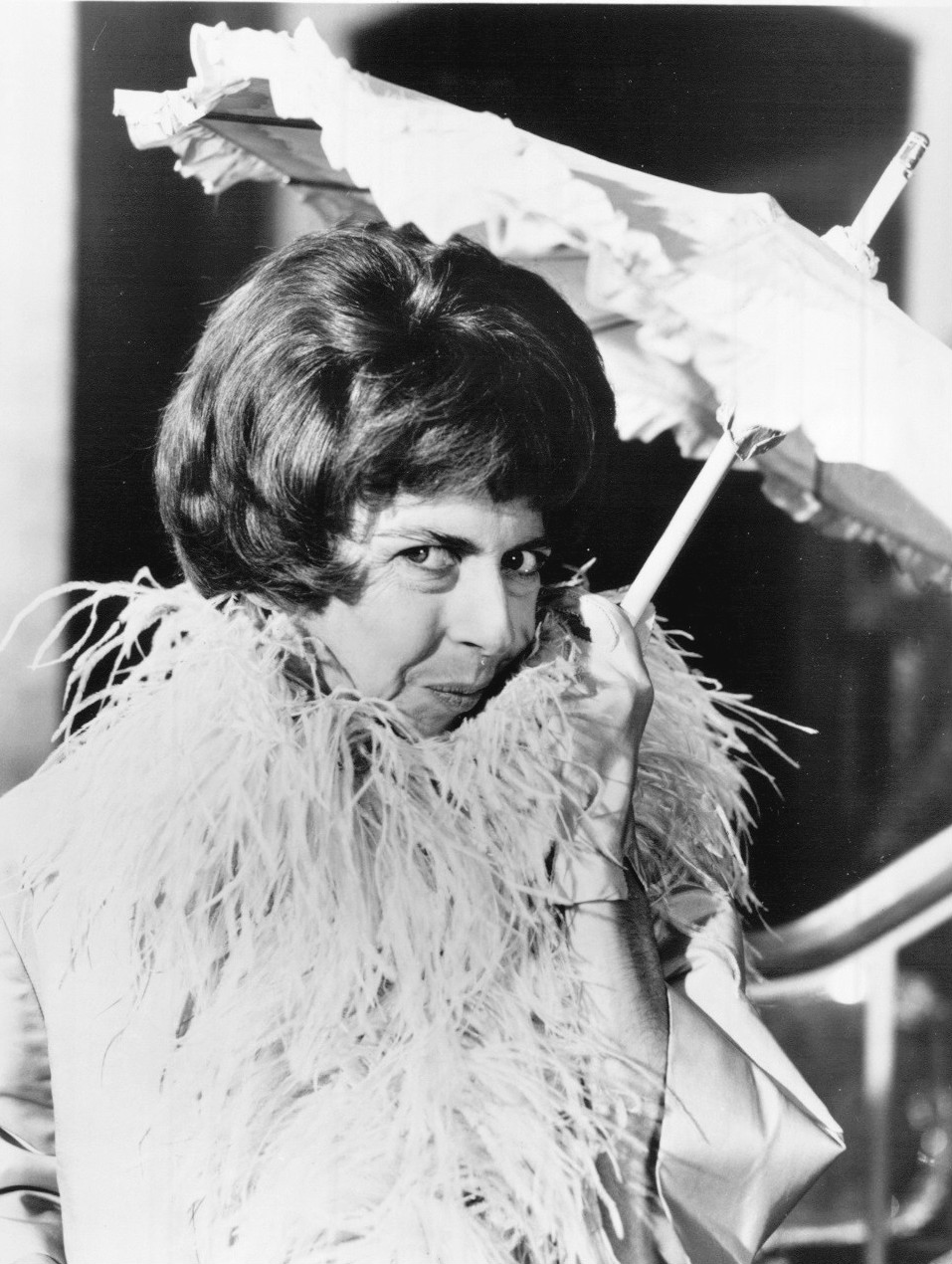
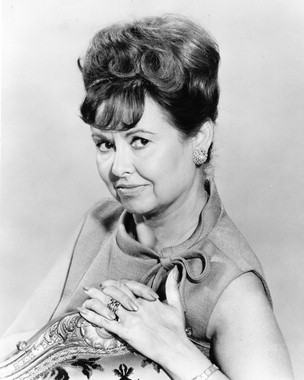
Alice Pearce (left) and Sandra Gould (right) as Gladys Kravitz

Gladys Kravitz (née Gruber) (Alice Pearce, Sandra Gould after Pearce's death) is Samantha and Darrin's nosy neighbor who lives across the street. She often witnesses incidents of witchcraft, but never can convince her husband Abner of what she saw. The Alice Pearce version of Gladys Kravitz was nosy and confused, but generally good-hearted and was often friends with the Stephenses; Samantha and Gladys were particularly friendly, and were seen together at lunches and social events. Though she sees many strange events, and connects Samantha with many of them, Pearce's version of Gladys doesn't actually bear ill-will to Samantha. By contrast, the Sandra Gould version of Gladys Kravitz was more mean-spirited and very much an antagonist to the Stephens -- she was convinced Samantha was responsible for the strange events she kept witnessing, and was determined to expose her.

Despite being a secondary character, the name "Gladys Kravitz" has gained wide societal use as a synonym for an annoying busybody.

=== Abner Kravitz ===
Abner Kravitz (George Tobias) is Gladys's retired husband, frequently seen reading the paper, doing a crossword, or watching a sporting event. He does not believe the stories his wife tells about the unusual goings-on she claims to have seen at the Stephens household—by the time she gets him to come to the window to see some magic she has just witnessed, it is invariably all over. His sister, Harriet (Mary Grace Canfield), stayed with him once while Gladys was out of town (around the time Alice Pearce died). Harriet also witnessed some behavior that caused her to share her sister-in-law's opinion of their neighbors. Abner again disagreed just as he always did with his wife. The Kravitzes did not appear in the final season (Season 8), but they were referenced.

=== Aunt Clara ===
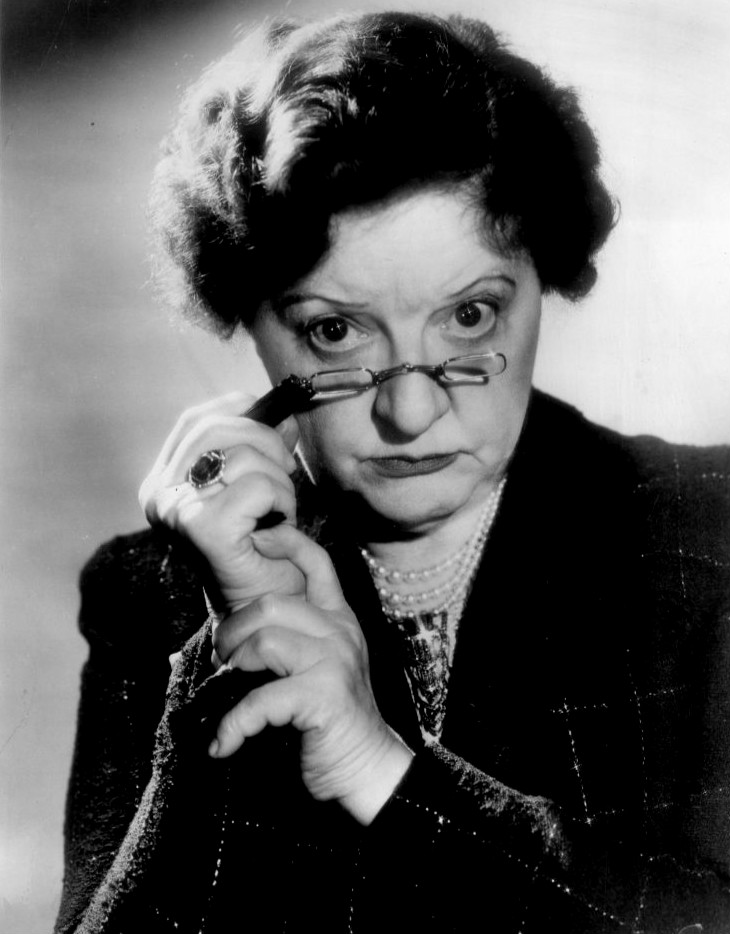
Marion Lorne played much-loved Aunt Clara

Aunt Clara (Marion Lorne) is the only one of Samantha's relatives who had a truly good relationship with Darrin. She is Samantha's bumbling, elderly, and absent-minded but lovable aunt. The well-meaning Aunt Clara's spells usually backfire, and her entrances and exits are often a grand fumble, such as entering via a chimney or colliding with a wall. She has a collection of over 3,000 doorknobs (inspired by Lorne's real-life collection). Rather than recast the role after Marion Lorne died at the end of the fourth season, a new character was introduced in season six with Samantha's bumbling new housekeeper Esmeralda.

=== Tabitha Stephens ===
Tabitha Stephens (Erin Murphy) (spelled Tabatha in production credits until season 5) is Samantha and Darrin's older child born in season 2. She has supernatural powers. Tabitha Stephens' birth in the season 2 episode "And Then There Were Three" featured infant Cynthia Black in the role. For the remainder of the season, Tabitha was played by twins Heidi and Laura Gentry, followed by twins Tamar and Julie Young. Fraternal twin toddlers Diane Murphy and Erin Murphy were cast for the role at the beginning of season 3. In time, they began to look less alike, so Diane was dropped during season 4. Diane made several guest appearances in other roles, and filled in as Tabitha one last time in season 5's "Samantha Fights City Hall", because Erin had the mumps. The character was the focus of a spin-off series, Tabitha, initially played by Liberty Williams in the 1976 pilot and by Lisa Hartman in the short-lived 1977 series. Despite airing only five years after the end of the original series, and being set in the 1970s as were the final seasons of Bewitched, Tabitha is depicted as a 20-something college graduate in the spin-off.

=== Adam Stephens ===
Adam Stephens (David Lawrence) is Samantha and Darrin's younger son. Just like his mother and older sister, he has supernatural powers. In the Tabitha TV show pilot, he is played by Bruce Kimmel and he also possessed warlock powers and a mischievous nature, but in the series itself, he was played by David Ankrum, and was often the disapproving mortal figure of the family, much like their father was. Despite his entreaties to his sister to not use her powers, and his dismay when their Aunt Minerva (Karen Morrow) encouraged her to use them, he really does love his sister very much. A continuity error switched the birth order of Tabitha and Adam (in Bewitched, Tabitha is older and Adam is younger; in Tabitha, Adam is older and Tabitha is younger).

=== Serena ===
Serena (Elizabeth Montgomery, although credited as "Pandora Spocks," Montgomery's spin on the phrase "Pandora's box," in many of her appearances from 1969 to 1971) is Samantha's cousin on Maurice's side. Serena is first seen in episode, #54, "And Then There Were Three".

Serena looks like Samantha, with a few notable exceptions. She has raven-black cropped hair, sports a tattoo under her left eye which changes from one episode to another, often referencing the episode theme, and wears mod mini-skirts.

Serena's personality is, however, the antithesis of Samantha's. Egocentric, ever mischievous, irresponsible, and somewhat bawdy, she often flirts with Larry Tate (calling the white-haired Tate "Cotton-Top") just for sport. She occasionally dates mortals and has been known to flirt with Darrin while pretending to be Samantha. Despite her conduct and frequent co-plotting with Endora, Serena has been known to assist Samantha and Darrin, although she finds them "both a bit square".

=== Uncle Arthur ===
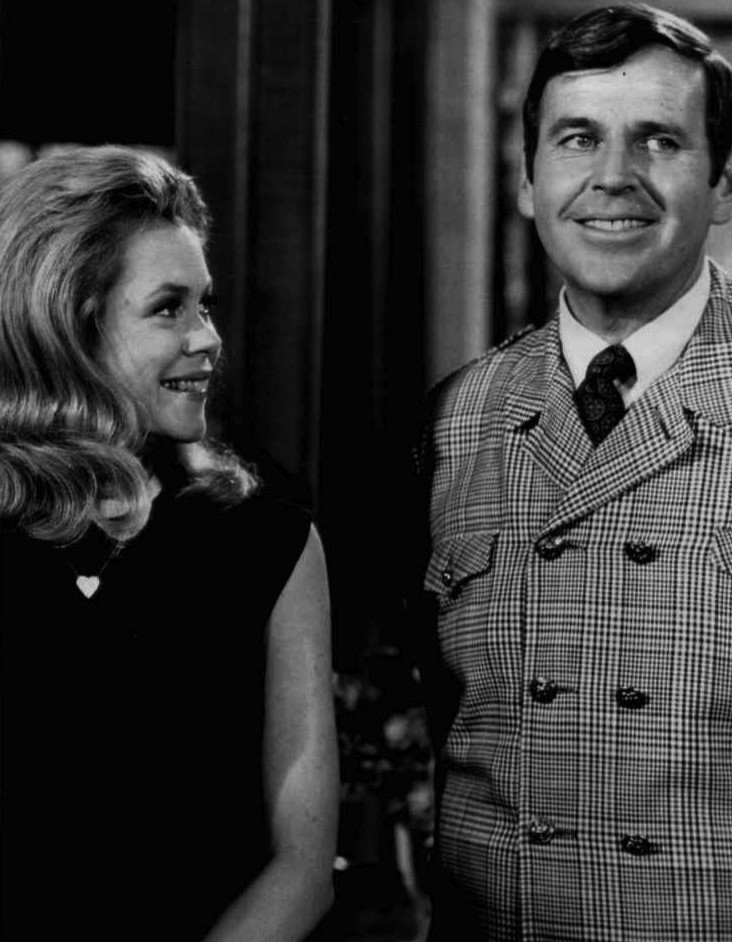
Samantha and Uncle Arthur in the 1968 episode "No Harm Charm"

Uncle Arthur (Paul Lynde), Endora's prank-loving, joke and pun telling brother, makes several appearances. Despite many practical jokes at Darrin's expense, Uncle Arthur has a less antagonistic relationship with him than Endora does. In one episode, both Serena and Uncle Arthur go head-to-head with the Witches Council to support the Stephenses' union, only to have their own powers suspended. Samantha is clearly very fond of her uncle, and vice versa.

=== Dr. Bombay ===
Dr. Bombay (Bernard Fox) is a witch doctor and womanizer, almost always accompanied by a buxom assistant in a nurse's outfit. He constantly cracks stale jokes. A strange occurrence or condition caused by a supernatural illness is occasionally used as a plot device, and his assistance is often sought. He could be summoned by the phrase: "Calling Dr. Bombay, calling Dr. Bombay. Emergency, come right away." His first name, Hubert, was revealed in the final episode of the spinoff series Tabitha where he marries his mortal nurse.

=== Esmeralda ===
Esmeralda (Alice Ghostley) is the Stephenses' anxiety-ridden and magically inept "Yoo-Hoo" maid. She is prone to uncontrolled bursts of magic (especially when she sneezes) and becomes invisible when she is nervous. Like Clara, her magic is unpredictable but, because her powers are weak, the manifestations usually fade away in time. Esmeralda was introduced in 1969 after Lorne's death. Ghostley stated that she did not consider her character as a replacement for Clara.

=== Phyllis Stephens ===
Phyllis Stephens (Mabel Albertson) is Darrin's straight-laced mother who visits occasionally but never learns of Samantha's supernatural powers. Phyllis makes inopportune surprise visits (which often cause Samantha to use magic to clean up the house quickly). Phyllis often becomes discombobulated and complains of "a sick headache" after accidentally witnessing something inexplicable. She and Endora do not get along, as Endora often displays contempt for her mortal counterpart. Phyllis also once thought her husband was having an affair with Endora, which did not help relations between the two. They are civil to one another in what Samantha refers to as "killing each other with kindness".

=== Frank Stephens ===
Frank Stephens (Robert F. Simon, Roy Roberts) is Darrin's laid-back father. He loves musicals and operas and once, during the first season, he and Endora go together to a musical, from which he doesn't come back that night. He and his wife, Phyllis, get near to a divorce, until Samantha and Endora use their magic to bring them back together.

=== Maurice ===
Maurice (Maurice Evans) is Samantha's father, an urbane thespian, and the only warlock in the House of Lords. Insisting that his name is pronounced "Maw-REESE", he bristles with indignation at hearing it pronounced "Morris" (whereas actor Maurice Evans' pronounced his first name as "Morris" -- and his real attitude was the exact opposite to that of the character he portrayed). He often embellishes his entrances and exits with strained Shakespearean verse. Bewitched is unique for pre-1970s sitcoms in that it portrays Endora and Maurice in, as Maurice describes to his private secretary, "an informal marriage". Maurice once introduces Endora as "her (Samantha's) mother", and Endora twice threatens, if she does not get what she wants, to "move back in" with Maurice, a prospect that terrifies him. In the episode "Samantha's Good News", Endora threatens to file for an "ectoplasmic interlocutory" (i.e. "divorce"), only to wrangle Maurice's affection. He is also a member of the Warlock's Club in London. Maurice refers to Darrin with incorrect names (like Endora), including "Duncan" and "Dustbin", with Endora going so far as to "correct" him, saying "that's Durwood". Once in the series he kisses Endora, and after takes her to "the little place, we used to go to on the Milky Way" (episode: "A Plague on Maurice and Samantha"). Like Endora, he dotes on his grandchildren, Tabitha and Adam, who call him "Grandpapa".

=== Aunt Enchantra, Aunt Hagatha, Aunt Grimalda and other family members ===
Apart from those members of Samantha's family who made up some of the supporting characters on the show (parents Endora and Maurice, Aunt Clara, Cousin Serena and Uncle Arthur), the vast majority of the members of her extended family (Cousin Panda, Cousin Lucretia, Great-Uncle Lorenzo, et al.) were mentioned in passing or in cursory lists of relatives rather than actually appearing on the show. Aunt Hagatha was frequently mentioned as a back-up babysitter for Tabitha when Endora or Aunt Clara was not available, whereas Enchantra was mentioned now and again when Samantha rattled off a litany of other witch-relatives. Aunt Hagatha and Aunt Enchantra, seemingly maternal aunts (or possibly great-aunts) given their familiar interactions with Endora and more formal ones with Maurice, made a limited number of actual appearances on the show. Hagatha made several solo appearances (as a baby-sitter), but often appeared along with Enchantra, the two of them and Endora making up a coven to conduct official witch business including putting Aunt Clara on trial for her foul-ups and declining abilities and testing Tabitha's magical potential. The two aunts arrived in a supernatural, antique car called “Macbeth” that passed through walls into the Stephenses’ living room (sometimes driven by Rasputin, other times operating without a chauffeur). Hagatha, viewers learned in the episode regarding Tabitha, ran a school for the training of young witches, a school that Samantha attended as a girl. When Adam's powers were tested by Hagatha, Enchantra was absent and, instead, she arrived with Grimalda, presumably another maternal aunt or great-aunt. Like many minor characters on the show, Hagatha and Enchantra were portrayed by different actresses over the course of the series. Enchantra was played by three women (Estelle Winwood, Ottola Nesmith and Diana Chesney), whereas six women had the role of Hagatha (Reta Shaw, Nancy Andrews, Doreen McLean, Kay Elliot, Diana Chesney, and Ysabel MacCloskey. Note that Diana Chesney played both Hagatha and Enchantra in different episodes. Shaw also appeared as Bertha, inconsistently portrayed as yet another aunt or, perhaps, a long-time family friend). Actress Maryesther Denver was Aunt Grimalda for the character's single appearance.

=== Apothecary ===
A witches' apothecary named Postlethwaite (“Postlethwaite‘s Potent Potions”) (Bernie Kopell) is an amorous old warlock from whom help for supernatural illnesses is occasionally sought. He appears in four episodes.

=== Betty ===
Betty, the secretary at McMann and Tate, was played by various actresses, including Jill Foster (ten appearances) and Marcia Wallace.

=== Sheila Sommers ===
Sheila Sommers (Nancy Kovack) is Darrin's wealthy former fiancée and Samantha's nemesis. She appeared three times in the series: in the pilot episode ("I, Darrin, Take This Witch, Samantha"), and in "Snob in the Grass", where she tries to seduce Darrin, only to be publicly humiliated by Samantha's witchcraft. She also appeared in the 1968 episode "If They Never Met". Nancy Kovack also appears as the character Clio Vanita, Darrin's beautiful and flirtatious female client from Italy in the two-part episode "Cousin Serena Strikes Again".

=== Howard McMann ===
Howard McMann (Roland Winters, Leon Ames) is Larry Tate's business partner, and appears only twice during the series, in "Man of the Year" and "What Makes Darrin Run".

=== Charlie Leach ===
Charlie Leach (Robert Strauss) is a conniving private investigator who attempts to blackmail Samantha, with disastrous results, in "Follow that Witch" and "Catnapped". In the former episode, he was working for a client of Darrin's who was considering hiring the advertising firm. In the latter episode, he caught Samantha using her powers. The Leaches were the reverse of the Kravitzes with Charlie convinced that Samantha was a witch, while his wife, Charmaine (Virginia Martin) was convinced that her husband was crazy. However, unlike the Kravitzes, Charlie used blackmail to get Samantha to give him what he wants, but it always backfired when Samantha used her powers to defeat him. After "Catnapped", despite Charlie's vow to return, he and Charmaine were never seen or spoken of again.

=== Drunk ===
The character "Drunk in Bar," played by Dick Wilson, was frequently seen offering Darrin advice at the bar or getting tangled up in one of Samantha's magical mishaps. Since he was often intoxicated, it seemed that his hallucinations were likely a result of the liquor, which led him to reach for another drink. Wilson is also widely recognized for his role in a series of TV commercials as a grocery store employee "Mr. Whipple", famously encouraging people not to "Squeeze the Charmin". Wilson appeared as various characters in a total of 18 episodes of "Bewitched" between 1965 and 1972.

=== Other historical and fictional characters ===
Thanks to witchcraft, a number of interesting characters were seen, including Benjamin Franklin, Franklin Pierce, George and Martha Washington, Paul Revere, Sigmund Freud, Julius Caesar, Queen Victoria and Prince Albert, Leonardo da Vinci, Napoleon, King Henry VIII, Cleopatra, Bonanno Pisano, Santa Claus, Jack of Jack and the Beanstalk, Mother Goose, The Artful Dodger, Hansel and Gretel, The Tooth Fairy, the Loch Ness Monster, a leprechaun, Prince Charming, Sleeping Beauty, Willie Mays (playing himself), and Boyce and Hart (playing themselves).
