= The Quick and the Dead (1963 film) =

War film directed by Robert Totten

- Directed by: Robert Totten
- Written by: Sheila Lynch; Robert Totten
- Produced by: Sam Altonian
- Starring: Larry D. Mann; Victor French; Jon Cedar; Stuart Nisbet; Majel Barrett
- Cinematography: John Arthur Morrill
- Edited by: Weber Ford
- Music by: Jaime Mendoza
- Production company: Manson Corporation
- Distributed by: Beckman Film Corporation
- Release date: 1963
- Running time: 92 minutes
- Country: United States
- Language: English

The Quick and the Dead is a 1963 war film directed by Robert Totten, set in Nazi-occupied Europe during World War II.

== Plot ==
A group of American soldiers and Italian partisans during World War II join forces in northern Italy against the Germans.

== Cast ==
- Victor French as Milo Riley
- Majel Barrett as Teresa
- Louis Massad as Donatelli
- Sandy Donigan as Maria
- James Almanzar as Giorgio
- Larry Mann as Parker
- Jon Cedar as Lt. Rogers
- Joe Folino as American Soldier
- Gerald Ervin as American Soldier
- Joseph Locastro as Giovanni
- William Kirschner as Dr. Romano
- Frank D'Agostino as Priest
- Stuart Nisbet as Nazi Officer
- Ted French as Old Man
- Jack Crawford as American Officer
- Robert Harker as German Officer
