= Irene Vernon =

American actress (1922–1998)

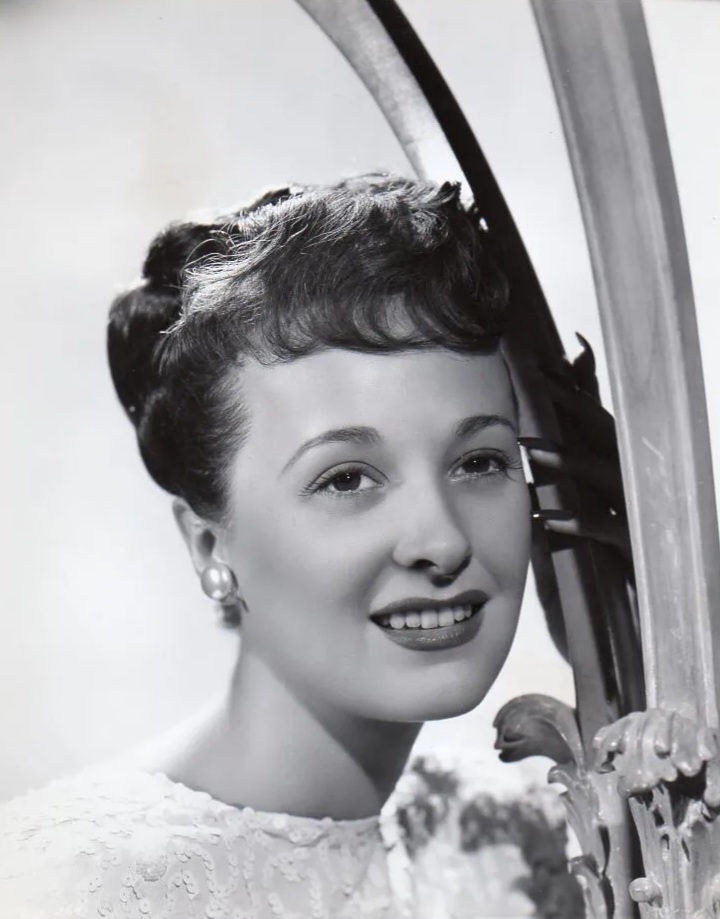
- Vernon in 1947
- Born: Irene Vergauwen; January 16, 1922; Mishawaka, Indiana, U.S.
- Died: April 21, 1998 (aged 76); South Bend, Indiana, U.S.
- Resting place: Saint Joseph Catholic Cemetery
- Other name: Irene Rosenberg
- Occupation: Actress
- Years active: 1947–1966

Irene Vernon (born Irene Vergauwen, January 16, 1922 – April 21, 1998) was an American actress.

== Background ==
Vernon was born Irene Vergauwen in Mishawaka, Indiana, and graduated from Mishawaka High School. Following graduation, she moved to New York to become an actress. Her career began with small uncredited roles in 1940s movies. Vernon ended her movie career in 1952, but during the 1950s, she began performing television roles.

== Career ==
Throughout the early 1950s, Vernon guest starred in shows such as Fireside Theater, The Lone Ranger, Danger, Flight, Dennis the Menace, and The Donna Reed Show. In 1964, Vernon began portraying Louise Tate on the hit television series Bewitched. Vernon held the role until 1966.

After writer Danny Arnold left the series, the producers, actress Elizabeth Montgomery and Montgomery's husband, director William Asher, reportedly pressured Vernon to also leave the show due to her friendship with Arnold (although the official reason given was that Vernon's husband was ill). Regardless of the reason for her departure from the show, Vernon's role on Bewitched was her last in film or television, as she left the industry entirely. The role of Louise Tate was later taken over by Kasey Rogers.

On Broadway, Vernon performed in The Lady in Ermine (1922).

== Personal life ==
On July 29, 1944, Vernon married U. S. Army Major Edward Duryea Dowling in Englewood, New Jersey. Before his military service, Dowling had been a director of musical shows.

On March 26, 1993, Vernon married Emanuel Rosenberg in Miami Beach, Florida. He preceded her in death on October 28, 1997.

== Death ==
Irene Rosenberg (as she was known at the time of her death) died on April 21, 1998, in South Bend, Indiana, aged 76. Death certificate indicates from congestive heart failure and coronary artery disease. She is interred in Saint Joseph Catholic Cemetery in Mishawaka, Indiana.

== Filmography ==
| Year | Title | Role | Notes |
|---|---|---|---|
| 1946 | Till the Clouds Roll By | Showgirl | Uncredited |
| 1947 | The Secret Life of Walter Mitty | Goldwyn Girl | Uncredited |
| 1948 | The Pirate | 'Nina' Showgirl | Uncredited |
| 1948 | A Song Is Born | Woman at Crow's Nest | Uncredited |
| 1950 | The Sound of Fury | Helen Stanton | |
| 1951 | The Blue Veil | Adult Stephanie | Uncredited |
| 1952 | Deadline – U.S.A. | Mrs. Burrows | Uncredited |
| 1960 | High Time | Matron | Uncredited |

== Television ==
| Year | Title | Role | Notes |
|---|---|---|---|
| 1964-1966 | Bewitched | Louise Tate | Wife of Larry Tate |
