= Kasey Rogers =

American actress (1925–2006)

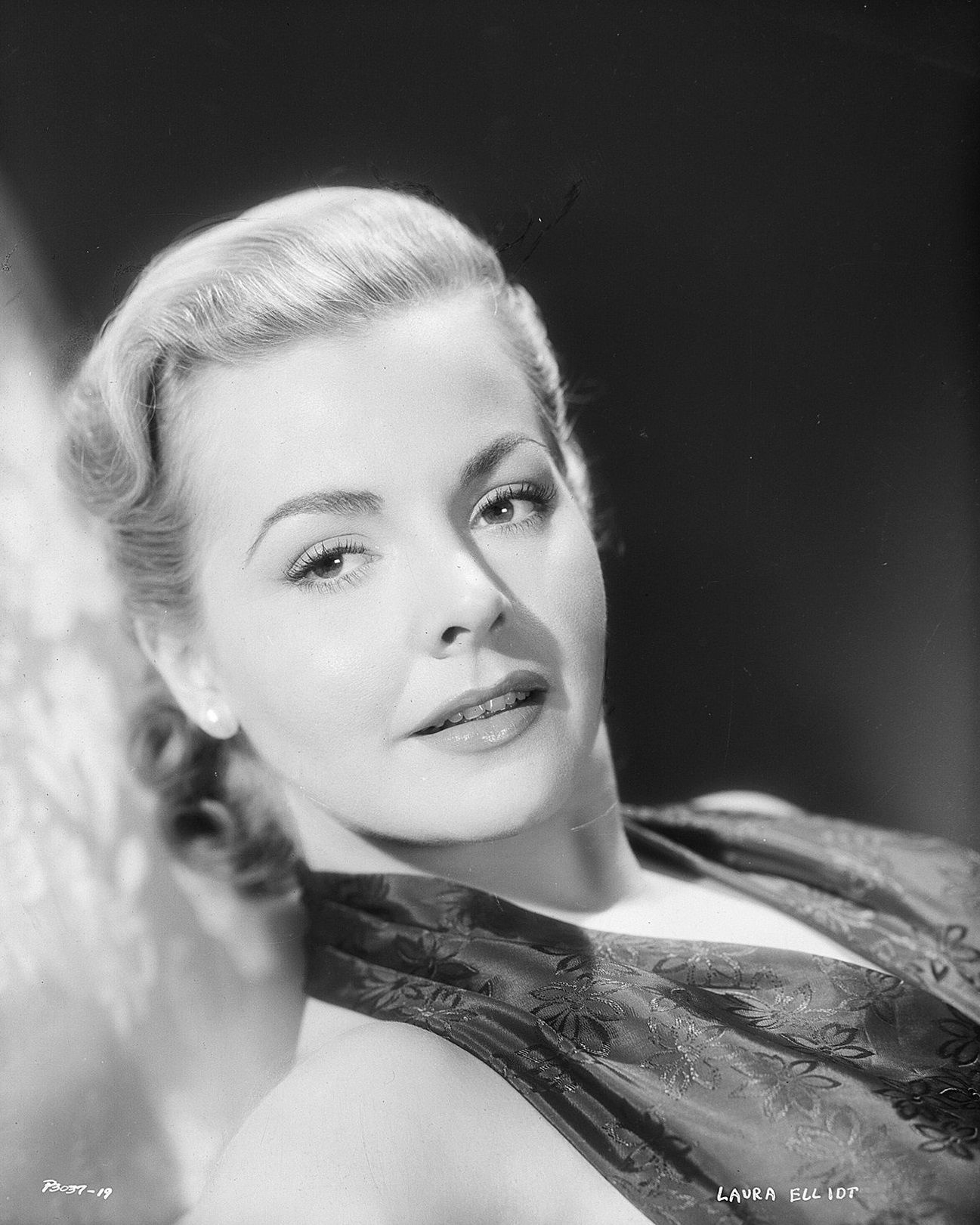
- Rogers in the 1950s
- Born: Josie Imogene Rogers; December 15, 1925; Morehouse, Missouri, U.S.
- Died: July 6, 2006 (aged 80); Los Angeles, California, U.S.
- Resting place: Forest Lawn Memorial Park (Hollywood Hills)
- Other names: Laura Elliott; Laura Elliot
- Occupation: Actress
- Years active: 1949–2000
- Spouse: Walter Winslow Lewis III "Bud" (1955-1974) (divorced) (3 children)
- Partner: Mark Wood
- Children: 4

Kasey Rogers (born Josie Imogene Rogers; December 15, 1925 – July 6, 2006) was an American actress and writer, best known for playing the second Louise Tate in the sitcom Bewitched.

== Life and career ==
Rogers was born Josie Imogene Rogers in Morehouse, Missouri, the daughter of Ina Mae (Mocabee) and Eben E. Rogers. She moved with her family to California at the age of two. As a child, her prowess at the game of baseball led her friends to nickname her Casey (after the famous poem "Casey at the Bat"). While under contract to Paramount, she used the stage name Laura Elliot. In 1955, she began working with a press agent in Hollywood, Walter Winslow Lewis III (aka "Bud"). It was Bud who suggested that she use the nickname with her maiden name and changed the "C" to a "K". They later married and had four children.

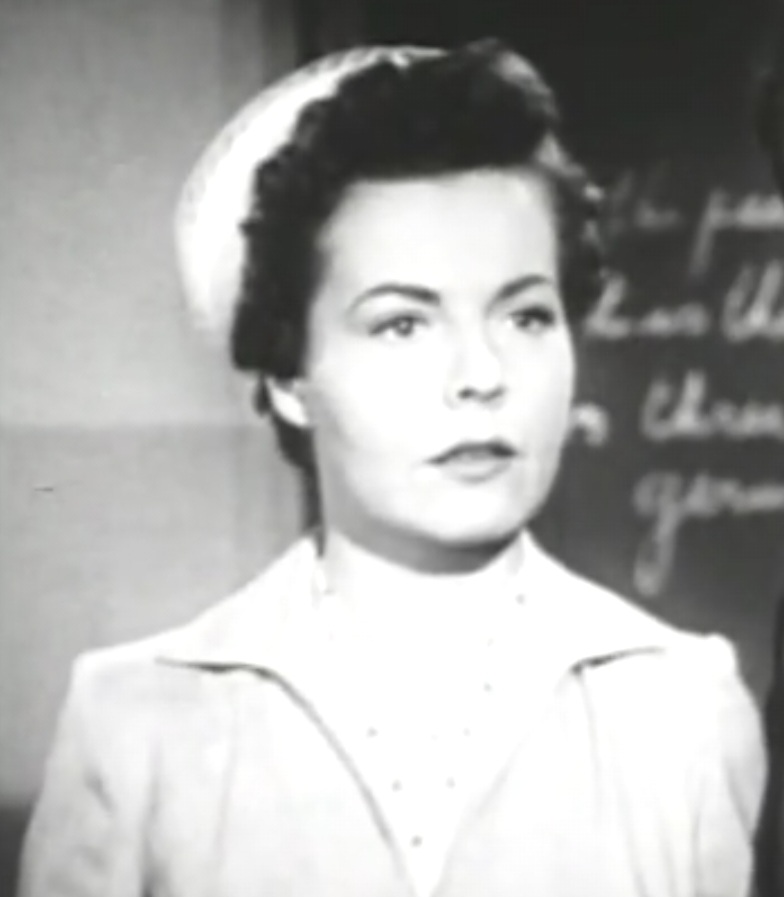
Rogers in the episode "Out of the Past" of The Public Defender (1954)

Rogers began work under the names Laura Elliott and Laura Elliot for Paramount Pictures. She appeared in movies such as Special Agent, Samson and Delilah, Silver City, Paid in Full, Two Lost Worlds, and, in perhaps her best-known film role, Alfred Hitchcock's Strangers on a Train, playing Miriam, the scheming, adulterous wife of Guy Haines (Farley Granger).

In the mid-1950s, Rogers began working on television. She guest-starred on various series, such as Sergeant Preston, Stage 7, The Restless Gun, The Lone Ranger, Bat Masterson, Maverick, Yancy Derringer, Perry Mason, as Francie Keene in the Wanted: Dead or Alive episode "Railroaded", and many other programs. In 1964 she landed a starring role on Peyton Place, portraying the character Julie Anderson, the mother of Betty Anderson (Barbara Parkins). She left the series in 1966 to replace Irene Vernon in the role of Louise Tate on Bewitched. In 1972, she performed as Louise Tate for the final time in the episode "Serena's Youth Pill". She then retired from acting, appearing in only a few guest television spots and making appearances on the Bewitched edition of E! True Hollywood Story.

== Death ==
After battling throat cancer for many years, Rogers went into cardiac arrest. She then suffered a stroke and died in Los Angeles, California, on July 6, 2006, aged 80. She was buried at the Forest Lawn, Hollywood Hills Cemetery in Los Angeles.

== Other achievements ==
In the 1970s, she became involved with motorcycles after her son began riding and then racing at the age of nine. Rogers became involved in the world of motocross racing. She worked closely with the AMA and established PURR ("PowderPuffs Unlimited Riders and Racers"), an association that brought women into the male-dominated sport, in 1974. PURR would later evolve into what is now the Women's Pro-Class division.

== Books ==
Rogers wrote five books with Mark Wood. The first was The Bewitched Cookbook: Magic in the Kitchen (1996), a cookbook based on the television series Bewitched with the foreword written by Rogers' co-star and friend Sandra Gould. Her other books are Halloween Crafts: Eerily Elegant Décor (2001), Character Wreaths: Holiday Projects for Year 'Round Decor (2002), Decorating for Christmas (2003), and Create a Bewitched Falloween: 55 Projects for Decorating and Entertaining (2003).

In 2013, Bewitched and Beyond: The Fan Who Came to Dinner by Mark Wood (with Eddie Lucas) was published by BearManor Media, a book that recounts Wood's friendship with Rogers. The title of Charles Tranberg's biography of Agnes Moorehead, I Love the Illusion, derives from Rogers' recounting how Moorehead used this expression when asked about acting.

== Partial filmography ==
- Special Agent (1949) - Lucille Peters
- Top o' the Morning (1949) - Larkin's Secretary
- Chicago Deadline (1949) - Marcia Grantland (uncredited)
- Samson and Delilah (1949) - Spectator
- The File on Thelma Jordon (1950) - Dolly - Cleve's Secretary
- Paid in Full (1950) - Tina, Bridesmaid
- Girls' School (1950) - Lucille Farnsworth
- No Man of Her Own (1950) - Friend of the Family (uncredited)
- Riding High (1950) - Spectator (uncredited)
- Union Station (1950) - Jenny - Clerk (uncredited)
- Dark City (1950) - Stewardess (uncredited)
- Two Lost Worlds (1951) - Elaine Jeffries
- The Mating Season (1951) - Bridesmaid / Party Guest (uncredited)
- A Place in the Sun (1951) - Miss Harper (uncredited)
- Strangers on a Train (1951) - Miriam Joyce Haines
- When Worlds Collide (1951) - Stewardess (uncredited)
- Here Comes the Groom (1951) - Maid (uncredited)
- Silver City (1951) - Josephine
- My Favorite Spy (1951) - Maria (uncredited)
- Something to Live For (1952) - Actress at Audition (uncredited)
- Denver and Rio Grande (1952) - Linda Prescott
- Jamaica Run (1953) - Janice Clayton
- The French Line (1953) - Katherine 'Katy' Hodges
- About Mrs. Leslie (1954) - Felice
- The McConnell Story (1955) - Claire (uncredited)
- Yancy Derringer (1958) - Black-eyed Susan in episode "Marble Fingers"
- Wanted Dead or Alive (1959) -- episode entitled "Railroaded", and as Ruby Todd in S2E3 "The Matchmaker"
- The Gunfight at Dodge City (1959) - Molly Day (uncredited)
- The Restless Gun (1959) - Episode "A Trial for Jenny May"
- Ask Any Girl (1959) - Girl in Tub (uncredited)
- Perry Mason (1960, TV Series) - Lois Langely, Irate Inventor s3e25
- Colt .45 (TV series) (1959) "Return To El Paso". Jessica Delgado
- Bat Masterson (1960) - Dixie Mayhew /Francine Wallace
- The Naked Flame (1964) - Elena
- Peyton Place (1964-1965) - Julie Anderson (103 episodes)
- Bewitched (1966-1972, TV Series) - The 2nd Mrs Louise Tate (33 episodes)
- Adam-12 (1971) Mrs. Jones
