= Mike Evans (actor) =

American actor (1949–2006)

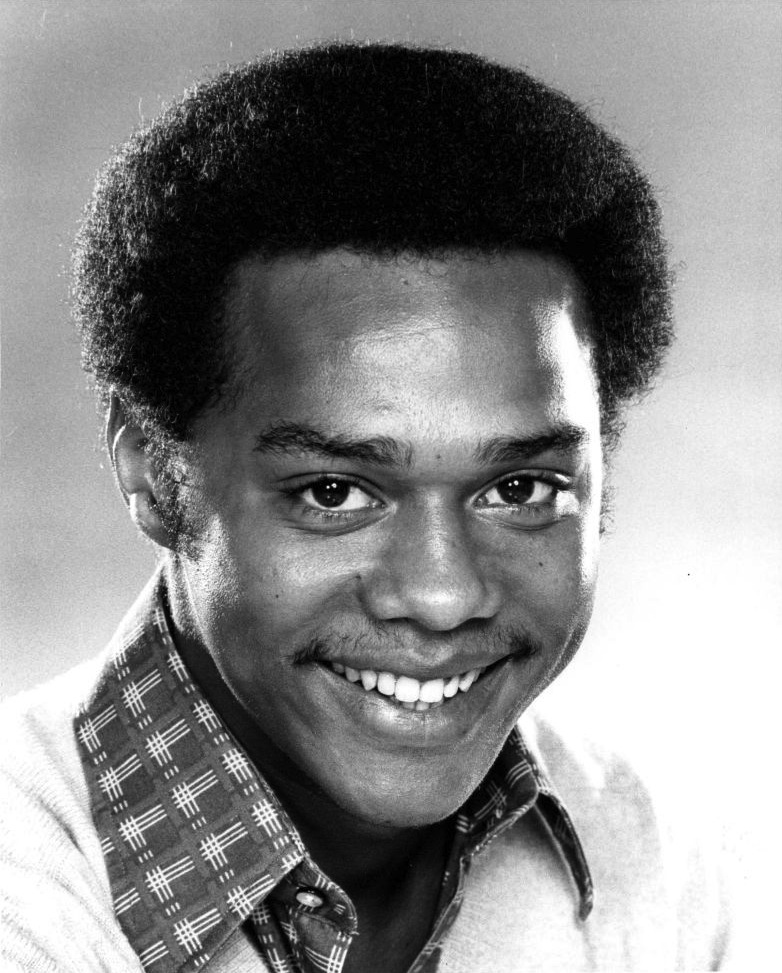
- Mike Evans, circa 1975
- Born: Michael Jonas Evans; November 3, 1949; Salisbury, North Carolina, U.S.
- Died: December 14, 2006 (aged 57); Twentynine Palms, California, U.S.
- Occupations: Actor/creator and writer
- Years active: 1971–1985
- Children: 2

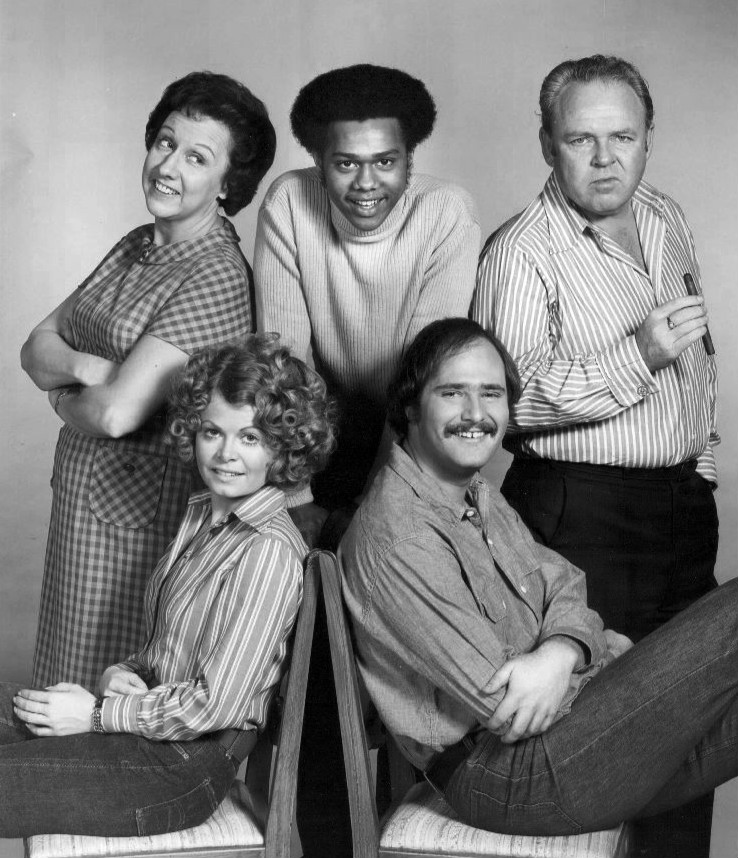
All in the Family cast. Back row, from left: Jean Stapleton, Evans, Carroll O'Connor. Front: Sally Struthers, Rob Reiner (1971)

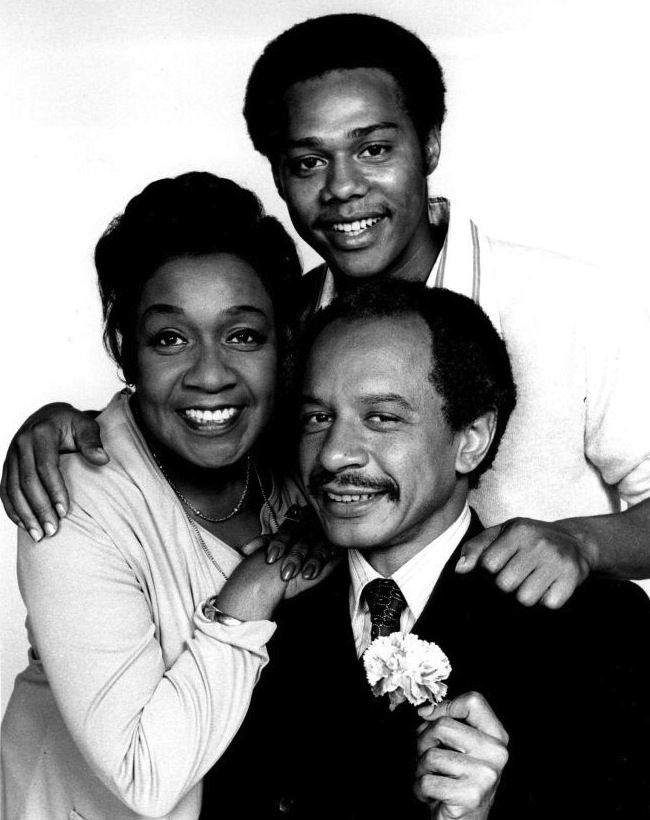
Cast of The Jeffersons, clockwise from top: Evans, Sherman Hemsley, and Isabel Sanford (1975)

Michael Jonas Evans (November 3, 1949 – December 14, 2006) was an American actor and television writer, best known as Lionel Jefferson on both All in the Family and The Jeffersons. Evans was a creator/writer of the series Good Times (1974–79). He was also a guest celebrity panelist on the TV game show Match Game.

== Early life ==
Evans was born in Salisbury, North Carolina, on November 3, 1949. His father, Theodore Evans Sr., was a dentist, and his mother, Annie Sue Evans, was a teacher. He attended Palmer Memorial Institute, a private school for young African Americans in Sedalia, North Carolina. His family later moved to Los Angeles, where he graduated from Los Angeles High School. He studied acting at Los Angeles City College.

== Career ==
A college student majoring in drama but with no acting experience, Evans caught his big break when All in the Family producer and director John Rich hired him to play Lionel Jefferson, the son of the Bunkers' new Black neighbors. Show developer Norman Lear preferred Cleavon Little for the role, but Rich lobbied to cast an actor who would appear less "threatening."

Evans continued to play the role on the spinoff The Jeffersons, but left after the first season to pursue other aspects of his career. According to Jimmie Walker, Evans had threatened to leave if he was not given more screen time, and Norman Lear let him out of his contract. Actor and opera singer Damon Evans (no relation to Michael) then took the role of Lionel, but Mike Evans returned to the role for the sixth, seventh, eighth and eleventh seasons. Evans was a creator/writer of the series Good Times (1974–79).

Evans played Lenny in the cast of the 1976–77 Danny Thomas situation comedy The Practice during its second and final season.

Evans was also a real estate investor and owned properties in California's Inland Empire.

== Personal life and death ==
Evans died of throat cancer at his mother's home in Twentynine Palms, California, at the age of 57. Evans never married.

== Filmography ==
| Year | Title | Role | Notes |
|---|---|---|---|
| 1971–1975 | All in the Family | Lionel Jefferson | Main cast (33 episodes) |
| 1972 | Killer by Night | Marley | Television film |
| 1972 | Call Her Mom | Wilson | Television film |
| 1972 | Now You See Him, Now You Don't | Myles | |
| 1972 | Love, American Style | Jerome Wilson | "Love and the Perfect Wedding" segment |
| 1973 | Voyage of the Yes | Orlando B. Parker | Television film |
| 1974 | The House on Skull Mountain | Phillippe Wilette | |
| 1974 | The Streets of San Francisco | Paul Hudson | Episode: "For Good or Evil" |
| 1975 | Far Out Space Nuts | | Episode: "Galaxy's Greatest Athlete" |
| 1975–1985 | The Jeffersons | Lionel Jefferson | Main cast (62 episodes) (final appearance) |
| 1976 | Rich Man, Poor Man | Arnold Simms | Television miniseries |
| 1976–1977 | The Practice | Lenny | Main cast (13 episodes) |
