= The Legend of Jimmy Blue Eyes =

- Directed by: Robert Clouse
- Written by: Edward P. Brophy (as Edmund Brophy)
- Starring: Donald Elson; Garland Thompson
- Cinematography: John A. Alonzo
- Edited by: Robert Wollin
- Music by: Teddy Buckner; Mario Casetta; Lincoln Mayorga
- Distributed by: Manson Distributing
- Release date: 1964
- Running time: 22 minutes
- Country: United States
- Language: English

The Legend of Jimmy Blue Eyes is a 1964 short film directed by Robert Clouse.

== Summary ==
'In Storyville, where blues were born/ There's a legend of a golden horn/ And a hot-lipped kid, blue-eyed and fair/ Who tried for a note that wasn't there.'

== Production ==
Teddy Buckner composed the film score. Janee Michelle had her film acting debut in the film. John A. Alonzo, who would later become best known for his camerawork for Chinatown, served as the cinematographer for The Legend of Jimmy Blue Eyes.

== Accolades ==
The film was screened at the 1965 Cannes Film Festival. The film was nominated for the Academy Award for Best Live Action Short Film at the 37th Academy Awards, but lost to Casals Conducts: 1964. The Legend of Jimmy Blue Eyes was Clouse's second film to be nominated for this award, the first being the 1962 film The Cadillac.

== Bibliography ==
- McCarty, Clifford (2000). Film Composers in America: A Filmography, 1911-1970. Oxford University Press. ISBN 0195114736.
