= Stuart Nisbet =

American character actor (1934–2016)

- Nisbet in The Virginian, 1970
- Born: January 17, 1934; Los Angeles, California, U.S.
- Died: June 23, 2016 (aged 82); Glendale, California, U.S.
- Occupation: Actor
- Years active: 1955–2001

Stuart Nisbet (January 17, 1934 – June 23, 2016) was an American character actor and former President of the Nesbitt/Nisbet Society of North America.

== Early life ==
Born in Los Angeles, California, Nisbet studied theater at Los Angeles City College and California State University, Los Angeles.

== Career ==
Nisbet guest starred on such television shows as Mama's Family; Murder, She Wrote; L.A. Law; Little House on the Prairie; Quincy, M.E. (in 2 episodes); Three's Company; McMillan & Wife; Emergency!; The Rockford Files; Kolchak: The Night Stalker; Happy Days; Adam-12 (in 2 episodes); Columbo (in 2 episodes); Cannon; Mannix (in 5 episodes); Night Gallery; Bonanza (in 9 episodes); Laredo, McCloud; The Partridge Family; Love, American Style (in 2 episodes); The Name of the Game; Dragnet (in 8 episodes); The Golden Girls; Get Smart (in 3 episodes); Mayberry R.F.D.; The Wild Wild West; The Monkees; Dundee and the Culhane, Mission: Impossible; Bewitched; My Three Sons; The Man from U.N.C.L.E.; The Fugitive; Gomer Pyle, U.S.M.C.; The Munsters; Dennis the Menace (as Mr. Wade), and The Dukes Of Hazzard. Nisbet appeared in several roles in a total of 19 episodes of the western TV series The Virginian. He appeared in 6 episodes of Barnaby Jones and 9 of Bonanza.

For more than 20 years, Nisbet ran the Baker-Nisbet casting agency, which he co-founded, in Hollywood.

== Death ==
Nisbet died on June 23, 2016, at Verdugo Hills Hospital in Glendale, California. He was 82. He was survived by his wife, children and grandchildren.

== Filmography ==
Year	Title	Role	Notes
1962	Third of a Man		Uncredited
1963	The Quick and the Dead		
1966	For Pete's Sake		
1967	Hot Rods to Hell	Surgeon	Uncredited
1967	The Ride to Hangman's Tree	Russell	Uncredited
1967	In the Heat of the Night	Shuie	
1967	Games	Detective	
1967	The Monkees	Bartender	S2:E13, "Monkees in Texas"
1968	Yours, Mine and Ours	Man of the Cloth	
1968	The Shakiest Gun in the West	Man Going Upstairs	Uncredited
1968	Dragnet 1968	Gideon C. Dengle	Poses as Policeman and Fire Chief
1968	The Virginian (TV series)	Bartender	saison 6 episode 24 (The handy man)
1969	Angel in My Pocket	Sheriff	
1969	Love Is a Funny Thing		Uncredited
1969	The Virginian (TV series)	Burt	saison 7 episode 18 (The price of love)
1969	The Virginian (TV series)	Bartender	saison 7 episode 21 (Eileen)
1969	The Virginian (TV series)	Bart	saison 7 episode 24 (the girl in the shadows)
1970	The Virginian (TV series)	Bart	saison 8 episode 24 (the gift)
1971	How to Frame a Figg	Gentry Groat	
1972	The Loners	Bridegroom	
1973	Slither	Buddy	
1973	The Mad Bomber	Attorney	
1973	Your Three Minutes Are Up	Dr. Claymore	
1974	Thunderbolt and Lightfoot	Couple at Station #2	
1974	The Law	Lieutenant Norland	
1974	Earthquake	Loudspeaker Voice	Voice, Uncredited
1974	The Missiles of October	Reporter #2	TV movie
1975	Hearts of the West	Lucky	
1977	Oh, God!	Doorman	Uncredited
1978	Mr. Too Little	Missionary Worker	
1982	Madame's Place	John Gilhooey	Episode: "In Love, Engaged, Crazy"
1989	The Fabulous Baker Boys	Veterinarian	
1989	Mama's Family	Burt Cooper	Episode: "Mr Wrong"
1994	Police Academy: Mission to Moscow	Anchor Person #2	
1995	Murder in the First	Harve	
1995	Casino	LA Banker	
