= Victor French =

American actor and director (1934–1989)

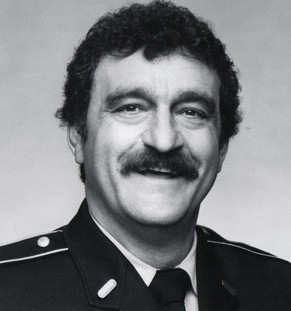
- French in 1977
- Born: Victor Edwin French; December 4, 1934; Santa Barbara, California, U.S.
- Died: June 15, 1989 (aged 54); Los Angeles, California, U.S.
- Occupations: Actor; director
- Years active: 1954–1989
- Known for: Gunsmoke; Highway to Heaven; Little House on the Prairie; Carter Country
- Spouses: Judith Schenz (m. 1959; div. 1975); Julie Cobb (m. 1976; div. 1978)
- Children: 3

Victor Edwin French (December 4, 1934 – June 15, 1989) was an American actor and director. He is remembered for roles on the television programs Gunsmoke, Little House on the Prairie, Highway to Heaven, and Carter Country.

== Early career ==
French appeared with his father, Ted, in one episode of Gunsmoke, "Prime of Life", and another episode, "The Wishbone", where he was credited as "Victor Frence", both in 1966. Ted French died in 1978.

French appeared in the war film The Quick and the Dead (1963), which was produced by the theatre arts department of Los Angeles Valley College in Van Nuys, which French attended. Also in 1963, he appeared as one of the "Spencer brothers" in the movie that was a forerunner of the television series The Waltons titled Spencer's Mountain starring Henry Fonda and Maureen O'Hara. Both the movie and the series were based upon the same novel by Earl Hamner Jr.

Like his father, French began his television career as a stuntman in mostly Westerns and anthology shows. He guest-starred in 39 television series. Though he had an uncredited role as an office clerk in the film The Magnificent Seven, French's first real Western role was the 1961 episode "The Noose" of the syndicated series Two Faces West. French was cast as Larrimore in the episode "Fargo" on the ABC/Warner Bros. Western series The Dakotas.

French appeared a record 23 times on Gunsmoke, often playing a dangerous or bumbling crook. On October 25, 1971, he portrayed cold-hearted robber and murderer Trafton. French guest-starred in another episode, "Matt's Love Story".

French appeared on The Waltons a year later. In "The Fulfillment", French plays blacksmith Curtis Norton, whose wife could not have children and subsequently adopts an eight-year-old orphan boy who has come to spend the week on Walton's Mountain.

This led to his being cast in his most well-known role as Mr. Edwards in Little House on the Prairie, beginning in 1974.

In other work, French starred opposite Elvis Presley in the 1969 Western, Charro!, and played the recurring character Agent 44 in the NBC series Get Smart in 1965–1966, where he portrayed an undercover spy who showed up in the worst, most unlikely of places (such as a mailbox, a porthole in a boat or in a standup clock), and appeared in a few episodes of Bonanza, with Michael Landon. Shortly before being teamed up once again, French made a guest appearance on Kung Fu as a corrupt, bigoted sheriff in 1973. French also guest-starred in episode 24 ("Trial by Fury") of season two of Mission: Impossible, in which he played the informer in a prison. Continuing in that corrupt mode, in 1974 on Gunsmoke, he played the part of "Sheriff Bo Harker", a ruthless & murderous town sheriff in "The Tarnished Badge" (S20E9).

In 1976, French appeared in an episode of the Western series Sara. In 1982, he appeared in the film An Officer and a Gentleman as the stepfather of protagonist Paula Pokrifki, played by Debra Winger.

== Work with Michael Landon ==
French co-starred with Michael Landon on Little House on the Prairie (1974–1977, 1981–1984) as Isaiah Edwards. French also directed some episodes of the show.

From 1977 to 1979, he left Little House on the Prairie to star as a small-town Georgia police chief in Carter Country.

After Little House on the Prairie, he appeared on Highway to Heaven (1984–1989) as Mark Gordon, co-starring with Landon.

== Personal life and death ==
French had two daughters and a son.

He died at the age of 54 on June 15, 1989, at Sherman Oaks Community Hospital in Los Angeles, California, three months after being diagnosed with lung cancer while filming the live-action segments for Rock-a-Doodle in Dublin. The remaining live-action segments for the film were directed by Don Bluth. Highway to Heaven aired its series finale two months after French’s death.

French was inducted into the Western Performers Hall of Fame at the National Cowboy & Western Heritage Museum in Oklahoma City.

== Filmography ==
=== Film ===
Year	Film	Role	Notes
1960	The Magnificent Seven	Front Office Clerk	Uncredited
1961	The Clown and the Kid	Patrolman #1	Uncredited
1963	The Quick and the Dead	Milo Riley	
1963	Spencer's Mountain	Spencer Brother	Uncredited
1968	Gavilan	Villain	
1969	Charro!	Vince Hackett	
1969	Death of a Gunfighter	Phil Miller	
1970	Cutter's Trail	Alex Bowen	TV film
1970	There Was a Crooked Man...	Whiskey	
1970	Flap	Sergeant Rafferty	
1970	Rio Lobo	Ketcham	
1971	Wild Rovers	Sheriff	
1972	The Other	Angelini	
1972	Chato's Land	Martin Hall	
1974	The Nickel Ride	Paddie	
1974	The House on Skull Mountain	Dr. Andrew Cunningham	
1974	The Tribe	Mathis	TV film
1979	Amateur Night at the Dixie Bar and Grill	Mac	TV film
1980	The Golden Moment: An Olympic Love Story	Anatoly Andreyev	TV film
1980	Riding for the Pony Express	Irving G. Peacock	TV film
1980	The Ghosts of Buxley Hall	Sergeant Major Chester B. Sweet	TV film
1981	Choices	Gary Carluccio	
1982	An Officer and a Gentleman	Joe Pokrifki	
1983	Little House: Look Back to Yesterday	Isaiah Edwards	TV film
1984	Little House: The Last Farewell	Isaiah Edwards	TV film
1984	Little House: Bless All the Dear Children	Isaiah Edwards	TV film

=== Television ===
Year	Title	Role	Notes
1955	TV Reader's Digest	Bill's Henchman	Episode: "Human Nature Through a Rear View Mirror"
1961	Two Faces West		Episode: "The Noose"
1961	Hazel	Bailiff	Episode: "A Matter of Principle"
1962	The Donna Reed Show	Mike	Episode: "The New Office"
1962	G.E. True		Episode: "Circle of Death"
1962	The Virginian	Roy	Episode: "The Accomplice"
1962	Bonanza	Conn	Episode: "Gallagher's Sons"
1963	Hawaiian Eye	Floyd Dillon	Episode: "The Long Way Home"
1963	The Dakotas	Larrimore	Episode: "Fargo"
1963	77 Sunset Strip	Deputy Collins	Episode: "Stranger from the Sea"
1963	Temple Houston	Willie Harrod	Episode: "Letter of the Law"
1963	Kraft Suspense Theatre	Murderer	Episode: "A Hero for Our Times"
1963	Grindl	Deputy #1	Episode: "The Great Schultz"
1964	The Virginian	Michael	Episode: "The Secret of Brynmar Hall"
1964	No Time for Sergeants	Leonard	Episode: "The $100,000 Canteen"
1964	Rawhide	Corporal	Episode: "Incident at Hourglass"
1965	Wagon Train	Beal	Episode: "The Silver Lady"
1965	Hogan's Heroes	Commando	Episode: "Kommandant of the Year"
1965	Mister Ed	Murphy	Episode: "Anybody Got a Zebra?"
1965	The Wild Wild West	Arnold	Episode: "The Night of a Thousand Eyes"
1965	Rawhide	Bartender	Episode: "The Vasquez Woman", uncredited
1965	Slattery's People	Peter Lindler	Episode: "The Hero"
1965	Dr. Kildare	Jack	Episode: "Welcome Home, Dear Anna"
1965	Ben Casey	Dr. Wood	Episode: "The Man from Quasilia"
1965	My Favorite Martian	Mugs Carson	Episode: "Lorelei Brown vs. Everybody"
1965	Lassie	Joe	Episode: "Charlie Banana"
1965	Get Smart	Insurance Man	Episode: "Too Many Chiefs"
1966	Batman	Hood No. I	Episode: "A Death Worse Than Fate"
1966	Get Smart	Agent 44	7 episodes
1966	Lassie	Surveyor	Episode: "The Untamed Land"
1966	Branded	Sheriff	Episode: "Kellie"
1966	The Hero	Fred Gilman	11 episodes
1966	Death Valley Days	Louis Baptiste	Episode: "Hugh Glass Meets the Bear"
1966–1975	Gunsmoke	Various roles	18 episodes
1967	Tarzan	Cotonasos	Episode: "A Pride of Assassins"
1967	F Troop	Corporal Matt Delaney	Episode: "The Day They Shot Agarn"
1967	Iron Horse	Harry Cleary	Episode: "Decision at Sundown"
1967	Captain Nice	Anthony	Episode: "The Week They Stole Payday"
1967	The Beverly Hillbillies	Tony	Episode: "Robin Hood and the Sheriff"
1967	Death Valley Days	Charbonneau	Episode: "The Girl Who Walked the West"
1967	Cimarron Strip	Rafe Coleman	Episode: "Till the End of Night"
1967	The Danny Thomas Hour	Detective	Episode: "The Zero Man"
1967	Daniel Boone	Blue Belly Sangster	Episode: "The Ballad of Sidewinder and Cherokee"
1967	The F.B.I.	Lloyd Smith	Episode: "False Witness"
1968	Gentle Ben	Turner	Episode: "Ben the Champ"
1968	Bonanza	Aaron Gore	Episode: "The Burning Sky"
1968	Mission: Impossible	Leduc	Episode: "Trial by Fury"
1969	Lancer	Travis Caudle	Episode: "The Measure of a Man"
1969	Bonanza	Jesse Potter	Episode: "Meena"
1969	The F.B.I.	Vincent Roger Tobias	Episode: "Moment of Truth"
1970	Daniel Boone	Ess	Recurring role
1970	Bonanza	Jesse Potter	Episode: "The Horse Traders"
1970	Dan August	Art Bowman	Episode: "When the Shouting Dies"
1970	Mannix	Karl Hastings	Episode: "Figures in a Landscape"
1971	Bonanza	Tom Callahan	Episode: "An Earthquake Called Callahan"
1971	Longstreet	Hank Cottle	Episode: "One in the Reality Column"
1971	Mission: Impossible	Vic Hatcher	Episode: "The Tram"
1971	O'Hara, U.S. Treasury	Paris Kohler	Episode: "Operation: Deadhead"
1973	The Streets of San Francisco	Reggie Norris	Episode: "Deathwatch"
1973	Kung Fu	Sheriff Aldon Pool	Episode: "The Ancient Warrior"
1973	The Rookies	Crazy Marvin	Episode: "Deadly Cage"
1973	The F.B.I.	Vince Riles	Episode: "Tower of Terror"
1974	Mannix	Matt Brandon	Episode: "The Dark Hours"
1974	The Waltons	Curtis Norton	Episode: "The Fulfillment"
1974–1983	Little House on the Prairie	Isaiah Edwards	57 episodes
1976	Sara	Achille	Episode: "Mountain Man"
1976	Petrocelli	Roy Caldwell	Episode: "The Pay Off"
1977–1979	Carter Country	Chief Roy Mobey	44 episodes
1979	CHiPs	Victor French	Episode: "Roller Disco"
1980	Disneyland	Sergeant Major Chester B. Sweet	Episode: "The Ghosts of Buxley Hall"
1984–1989	Highway to Heaven	Mark Gordon	111 episodes

== Director (film and television) ==
- Little House on the Prairie - 18 episodes (1974–1983)
- Gunsmoke - 5 episodes (1974–1975)
- Buck Rogers in the 25th Century - episode "The Satyr" (1981)
- Dallas - episode "Denial" (1982)
- Little House: Look Back to Yesterday - TV movie (1983)
- Little House: Bless All the Dear Children - TV movie (1984)
- Highway to Heaven - 12 episodes (1984–1986)
- Rock-a-Doodle - co-director (live action segments) (1991)
