= The House on Skull Mountain =

1974 film

- Theatrical release poster.
- Directed by: Ron Honthaner
- Written by: Mildred Pares
- Produced by: Ray Storey
- Starring: Victor French; Janee Michelle; Jean Durand; Mike Evans; Ella Woods
- Music by: Jerrold Immel
- Distributed by: 20th Century Fox
- Release date: October 16, 1974
- Running time: 89 minutes
- Country: United States
- Language: English

The House on Skull Mountain is a 1974 American horror film directed by Ron Honthaner. After Pauline Christophe (Mary J. Todd McKenzie), the sole heir for the mansion on Skull Mountain dies, four of her family members are called to hear her will. Upon arrival, each of the guests is stalked by a skeleton in a robe.

== Plot summary ==
Elderly Pauline Christophe dies in her home on Skull Mountain. Two days later, four of her relatives arrive for the funeral and reading of the will: Phillippe, Lorena, Dr. Andrew Cunningham, and Harriet Johnson. Pauline, as well as her butler Thomas and maid Louette, were avid practitioners of voodoo and the funeral proceedings are plagued by various voodoo related phenomena.

The night after the funeral, Philippe sees Thomas performing a ritual with a voodoo doll. When Thomas plunges a needle into the doll, Philippe falls down an empty elevator shaft to his death. Drawn by his screams, Cunningham finds Philippe's body, along with a voodoo fetish. The sheriff is called and takes the body away, telling the others they cannot leave town until after an autopsy is performed.

The next morning, while Lorena and Cunningham are in town, Harriet enters Pauline's room, discovering a voodoo shrine. A rocking chair begins to move and Harriet is bitten by a rattlesnake. Cunningham and Lorena return to find her unconscious and rush her to the hospital. Thomas kills Harriet with another voodoo doll. When Cunningham arrives at the hospital, he finds a feathered bead on Harriet's body.

Back at the house, Lorena sleeps while Cunningham keeps watch and reads one of the many voodoo books there. As Cunningham begins to fall asleep, Thomas conjures a snake, which slithers all over Lorena's sleeping body until she awakens and faints. She rises in a trance and leaves the room. Cunningham wakes up to discover Lorena missing, and begins to search for her. Louette leads him to a passageway at the bottom of the elevator shaft and leaves. Cunningham enters a room filled with people dancing around Louette, now tied to a pole in the center of the room. There is a skull atop the pole.

Thomas stabs Louette in the chest and pulls Lorena from the crowd to join in the ritual. Andrew finds a machete. As Lorena starts to come out of her trance, Thomas conjures a machete in his hand. As Thomas swings his machete, Cunningham grabs the skull on a stick, using it as a defense. Thomas splits it, and everyone screams. The lights go out and Cunningham finds he is the only one in the room. He goes to find Lorena, discovering her entranced in Pauline's bed. Thomas tells Cunningham that Lorena is his and will do anything he wants. As Thomas draws her toward him, Cunningham shakes her out of the trance.

Thomas performs a voodoo ritual to bring Pauline from the grave. Pauline rises from the dead, coming into the room to kill Cunningham. Cunningham uses his knowledge from reading the voodoo book to put a reversal spell on Pauline, who then goes for Thomas. Backing away, Thomas falls through the window, crashing to his death on the fence. Pauline returns to her grave.

The next morning, Cunningham asks Lorena to stay with him in the house, now that he's inherited it. She tells him she has to go, and he takes her to her car.

== Primary cast ==
- Victor French as Dr. Andrew Cunningham
- Janee Michelle as Lorena Christophe
- Jean Durand as Thomas Petion
- Mike Evans as Phillipe Wilette
- Ella Woods as Louette Pettitone
- Xernona Clayton as Harriet Johnson
- Lloyd Nelson as Sheriff
- Mary J. Todd McKenzie as Pauline Christophe
- Don Devendorf as Priest
- Jo Marie as Doctor
- Leroy Johnson as Mr. Ledoux
- Ray Bonner as Deputy Sheriff
- O.J. Harris as Voodoo Dancer

== Production ==
Shooting took place in Atlanta.

== Release ==
The motion picture had its world premiere at Loew's Grand Theater in Atlanta, Georgia, on October 16, 1974.

Fox released The House on Skull Mountain on DVD in September 2007.

== Reception ==
Writing in The Zombie Movie Encyclopedia, academic Peter Dendle described the film as having "crusty acting and hokey dialogue". In his book Mixed Blood Couples, film critic Steven Jay Schneider suggests that the choice of making French's and Michelle's characters cousins is an excuse to avoid depicting miscegenation.

== See also ==
- List of American films of 1974

== Bibliography ==
- Schneider, Steven Jay (2004). Ruth Bienstock Anolik; Douglas L. Howard (eds.). "Mixed Blood Couples: Monsters and Miscegenation in U.S. Horror Cinema". The Gothic Other: Racial and Social Constructions in the Literary Imagination. McFarland & Company: 72–89. ISBN 0786427108.
