= Robert DoQui =

American actor (1934–2008)

- DoQui in Sanford and Son, 1975
- Born: April 20, 1934; Stillwater, Oklahoma, U.S.
- Died: February 9, 2008 (aged 73); Los Angeles, California, U.S.
- Occupation: Actor
- Years active: 1964–2007
- Spouse: Janee Michelle (m. 1969; div. 1978)

Robert DoQui (April 20, 1934 – February 9, 2008) was an American actor who starred in film and on television. He is best known for his roles as King George in the 1973 film Coffy, Wade in the 1975 film Nashville, and Sgt. Warren Reed in the original RoboCop film series. He is also known for his voice as Pablo Robertson on the cartoon series Harlem Globetrotters from 1970 to 1973.

== Early life ==
DoQui was born on April 20, 1934, in Stillwater, Oklahoma. He served in the U.S. Air Force before heading to Hollywood in the early 1960s. DoQui was married to actress Janee Michelle from 1969 until 1978.

== Career ==
He is best known for his roles as the flashy pimp King George in the 1973 blaxploitation film Coffy. He starred in the film Walking Tall Part 2 in 1975, the miniseries Centennial in 1978, and the television film The Court-Martial of Jackie Robinson in 1990. He starred as Sgt. Warren Reed in the three RoboCop films. He made guest appearances on many television series, including I Dream of Jeannie, Happy Days, The Jeffersons, Mission: Impossible, The Fall Guy as Captain Coppersmith in the season 3 episode Boom Daniel Boone, Gunsmoke, Adam-12, The Parkers, Family Affair in Take Me Out of the Ballgame (1967 - Season 2, Episode 9) as Officer Wilson, and Star Trek: Deep Space Nine in the season 4 episode "Sons of Mogh" as a Klingon named Noggra.

== Death ==
DoQui died February 9, 2008, at the age of 73, from natural causes.

== Filmography ==
- Taffy and the Jungle Hunter (1965)
- The Outer Limits - The Invisible Enemy (1964)
- Clarence, the Cross-Eyed Lion (1965) - Sergeant
- The Cincinnati Kid (1965) - Philly (uncredited)
- The Fortune Cookie (1966) - Man in Bar
- Doctor, You've Got to Be Kidding! (1967) - Orderly (uncredited)
- Fitzwilly (1967) - Workman (uncredited)
- Up Tight! (1968) - Street Speaker
- The Devil's 8 (1969) - Henry Reed
- The Red, White, and Black (1970) - Eli Brown
- Mission Impossible (1971) - John Darcie (Kitara)
- The Man (1972) - Webson
- Adam 12 (1973) - Elword Staff
- Coffy (1973) - King George
- Willie Dynamite (1974) - Baylor the Pimp (uncredited)
- Nashville (1975) - Wade
- Buffalo Bill and the Indians, or Sitting Bull's History Lesson (1976) - The Wrangler (Oswald Dart)
- Treasure of Matecumbe (1976) - Ben
- Green Eyes (1977) - Hal
- Guyana: Crime of the Century (1979) - Oliver Ross
- I'm Dancing as Fast as I Can (1982) - Teddy
- Cloak & Dagger (1984) - Lt. Fleming
- Fast Forward (1985) - Mr. Hughes
- My Science Project (1985) - Desk Sergeant
- Good to Go (1986) - Max
- Pound Puppies (1986) (TV) - Additional voices
- RoboCop (1987) - Sergeant Warren Reed
- Mercenary Fighters (1988) - Colonel Kyemba
- Paramedics (1988) - Moses
- Miracle Mile (1988) - Fred the Cook
- RoboCop 2 (1990) - Sergeant Warren Reed
- The Court-Martial of Jackie Robinson (1990) (TV) - Top Sergeant
- Diplomatic Immunity (1991) - Ferguson
- I Don't Buy Kisses Anymore (1992) - Fred
- RoboCop 3 (1993) - Sergeant Warren Reed
- Short Cuts (1993) - Knute Willis
- Walking Thunder (1997) - Gun Trader
- Glam (1997) - Don Mallon
- A Hollow Place (1998) - Alban Porter
- Positive (2007) - Josh (final film role)
