= List of Little House on the Prairie episodes =

Little House on the Prairie is an American Western historical drama about a family living on a farm in Walnut Grove, Minnesota from the 1870s to the 1890s. The show is a full-color series loosely based on Laura Ingalls Wilder's series of Little House books.

The regular series was preceded by a two-hour television film, which first aired on March 30, 1974, and served as a backdoor pilot for the series. The series aired on NBC from September 11, 1974 to March 21, 1983. Following the departure of Michael Landon after season eight, the series was renamed Little House: A New Beginning for season nine. Three made-for-television post-series movies followed during the 1983–84 television season: Little House: Look Back to Yesterday (1983), Little House: The Last Farewell (1984), and Little House: Bless All the Dear Children (1984).

The majority of the episodes filled a 60-minute timeslot. Some expanded episodes originally aired as a single episode in a 120-minute timeslot. These have been indicated as such. Only those episodes that originally aired as two parts are listed as two part episodes.

== Series overview ==
Season	Episodes	Originally released	
Season	Episodes	First released	Last released
Pilot movie		March 30, 1974	
1	23	September 11, 1974	May 7, 1975
2	22	September 10, 1975	March 31, 1976
3	21	September 27, 1976	April 4, 1977
4	22	September 12, 1977	March 13, 1978
5	24	September 11, 1978	March 19, 1979
6	23	September 17, 1979	May 12, 1980
The Little House Years		November 15, 1979	
7	22	September 22, 1980	May 11, 1981
8	22	October 5, 1981	May 10, 1982
9	21	September 27, 1982	March 21, 1983
Post-series Movies		December 12, 1983	December 17, 1984

== Pilot movie premiere (1974) ==
Title	Directed by	Written by	Original release date
Little House on the Prairie	Michael Landon	Blanche Hanalis	March 30, 1974
Charles and Caroline Ingalls move with their three young daughters, Mary, Laura, and Carrie from the big woods of Wisconsin to the open prairies of Kansas. Their closest neighbor, Isaiah Edwards, helps them settle on the prairie as they encounter fierce storms, destructive fires, and tribes of the Osage Nation. Ultimately, the government forces the family off the land in Kansas.

== Episodes ==
=== Season 1 (1974–1975) ===
No. overall	No. in season	Title	Directed by	Written by	Original release date	Prod. code
1	1	"A Harvest of Friends"	Michael Landon	Story by : John Hawkins; Teleplay by : John Hawkins & William Putman	September 11, 1974	1002
The Ingalls family moves to the banks of Plum Creek, near Walnut Grove, Minnesota, and Charles gets a job at Hanson's mill for the lumber to build the 'Little House'. Then, needing a plough and wheat seeds to make a crop, he has a disappointing first encounter with the Olesons and makes a tough deal with the feed and seed merchant, Liam O'Neill. Despite the tough long hours of arduous work on top of his own farm work, Charles copes until a family picnic in the meadow leads to a serious setback with him getting injured after falling out of a tree. When O'Neill wants to enforce the terms of their deal, threatening the Ingalls' prospects, the businessmen of Walnut Grove, who have seen Charles's willingness to work, come to his aid. Laura reminisces about her father claiming to have reaped a harvest he did not expect: a harvest of friends. Guest cast: Ramon Bieri as Liam O'Neill
2	2	"Country Girls"	William F. Claxton	Juanita Bartlett	September 18, 1974	1001
Mary and Laura begin their first day of school at Walnut Grove and meet their teacher, Miss Eva Beadle. While Caroline learns how to deal with Harriet Oleson, the rich part-owner of Oleson's Mercantile, Laura learns how to deal with the Olesons' spoiled daughter, Nellie. Then Laura encounters an even greater problem, when all the children have to write an essay for Parents' Day, but she creatively rises to the occasion.
3	3	"100 Mile Walk"	William F. Claxton	Ward Hawkins	September 25, 1974	1003
Anticipating a bumper return from his wheat crop, Charles is devastated when a hail-storm flattens all the crops in the area. As a result, he has to travel away from home to find work and make some money, and he meets up with Jack Peters and Jacob Jacobsen. Jack has a job as a powder monkey in a quarry and enables Charles and Jacob to get work there too, where the dangerous work is well paid. Meanwhile, with the men away, Caroline organizes the local wives and children to salvage what they can of the wheat, using only their manual labor. Guest cast: Don Knight as Jack Peters, and Rick Hurst as Jacob Jacobsen
4	4	"Mr. Edwards' Homecoming"	Michael Landon	Joel Murcott	2 October 1974	1004
While in Mankato, Charles encounters a drunken Mr. Edwards in the midst of a bar fight and takes him back to Walnut Grove. To encourage him to stay, Charles gets him a job at Hanson's Mill, while Caroline sets him up with widow Grace Snider. Their relationship appears to be blooming until they have a serious difference of opinion.
5	5	"The Love of Johnny Johnson"	William F. Claxton	Gerry Day	9 October 1974	1005
Laura has a crush on a new boy in school named Johnny Johnson, an older student in her class, but Johnny only wants to be her friend, while he is romantically attracted to Mary, who has no interest in him. Laura's jealousy leads to her accusing Mary of deliberately encouraging Johnny, and they fall out. Caroline and Charles both have talks with Laura to restore harmony in the family.
6	6	"If I Should Wake Before I Die"	Victor French	Harold Swanton	23 October 1974	1006
After the sudden death of her dear friend, 80-year old "Miss Amy" Hearn feels lonely for her children Bridget, Sean, and Andy, and grandchildren who never visit her. At the funeral, Laura declares that it is not fair for loved ones to ignore a birthday but show up for a funeral, so Miss Amy decides to have her funeral wake before she dies, and she enlists the help of Doctor Hiram Baker and Charles and Caroline to secretly plan the event. She attends the reception incognito at first, with a veil hiding her face, before surprising the others present, including a son she had not known was still alive. Guest cast: Josephine Hutchinson as Amy O'Hara Hearn, Betty Lynn as Bridget, Frank Parker as Sean Hearn, and Herman Poppe as Andy Hearn.
7	7	"Town Party, Country Party"	Alf Kjellin	Juanita Bartlett	30 October 1974	1007
While at Nellie Oleson's birthday party, Nellie pushes Laura and hurts her ankle. This leads to Laura becoming friends with Olga Nordstrom, a quiet girl from her school who was born with her left leg shorter than the right leg. When her grandmother begs Charles for help, he has an idea for a way to help Olga, despite her embittered father Jon's lack of support. Jon is overly protective and doesn't want his daughter to go anywhere. When the Ingalls girls have their own party with their friends from school, Laura exacts revenge on Nellie. Meanwhile, when Jon finds out that Charles was fitting Olga with specially adaptive shoes, he goes to the Ingalls house to confront him, and the two attack each other; the fight abruptly comes to a stop when Jon sees his daughter happily playing with the other children. Guest cast: Kim Richards as Olga Nordstrom, and Jan Merlin as Jon Nordstrom
8	8	"Ma's Holiday"	Leo Penn	Dale Eunson	6 November 1974	1010
Charles decides to surprise Caroline with a romantic holiday in Mankato for just the two of them. When Grace Snider falls ill, Laura and Mary persuade Mr. Edwards to stay and look after the girls, but he discovers that they, and especially Carrie, can sometimes be hard work. Meanwhile, despite Charles's best efforts, Caroline cannot stop thinking about the children.
9	9	"School Mom"	William F. Claxton	Story by : Jean Rouverol; Teleplay by : Ward Hawkins	13 November 1974	1011
When Miss Beadle is injured and ordered to rest by Doc Baker, Caroline is invited by the school board to take over as substitute teacher of the Walnut Grove School. One of the older students, Abel McKay, is teased by the other children because he is illiterate, and when Caroline's attempts to help him are undermined by Mrs. Oleson's meddling, he runs out. Caroline leaves and vows not to return to the school until she can convince Abel to try again. Guest cast: Dirk Blocker as Abel McKay
10	10	"The Racoon"	William F. Claxton	Joseph Bonaduce	20 November 1974	1013
When Laura accidentally breaks her toy doll while playing catch with Mary, Mary finds an orphaned baby raccoon and takes it home, where Laura decides to take care of it. Charles is persuaded by the girls and Caroline to let them keep it for a while and Laura names him Jasper. However, its wild instincts surface, and Jasper bites Laura and Jack, then runs away. The girls keep it a secret, but when Charles has to deal with a raccoon raiding the chickens and everyone assumes that it was Jasper, it gives rise to a frightening possibility for Laura and Jack. The family is overjoyed when a healthy Jasper returns, revealing that there were two different raccoons all along.
11	11	"The Voice of Tinker Jones"	Leo Penn	Tony Kayden & Michael Russnow	4 December 1974	1012
When Reverend Robert Alden asks for donations for a bell for the church building, Mrs. Oleson announces that she and her husband will donate a large bell, along with a plaque with their names. This divides opinions in the town, causing Reverend Alden to feel he is to blame so he decides he should leave. The situation is saved by a mute copper-smith, 'Tinker' Jones, who enlists the help of the local children in making their own bell. Guest cast: Chuck McCann as 'Tinker' Jones. Sean Penn appears as an uncredited kid.
12	12	"The Award"	William F. Claxton	Michael Landon	11 December 1974	1014
While Charles and Mr. Edwards are away for three weeks on a delivery trip for Mr. Hanson, Mary is enthralled by the prize to be awarded for the best score in an extra-credit examination, a Webster's Dictionary. However, her late-night studying causes a fire in the barn, resulting in Caroline forbidding her to take the examination, but Mary decides to take the test anyway. When Caroline finds out the truth, she prepares for a showdown with Mary, but another surprise is in the offing for her, and mother and daughter are reconciled.
13	13	"The Lord is My Shepherd"	Michael Landon	Michael Landon	December 18, 1974 (Note: The Lord is My Shepherd originally aired as a single episode with a 120 minute runtime. It may air as two parts in syndication or on DVD sets.)	1008
13	13	"The Lord is My Shepherd"	Michael Landon	Michael Landon	December 18, 1974	1009
The Ingalls family is delighted by the birth of a baby boy, Charles Frederick Ingalls, but Laura becomes jealous about the attention he receives from Charles and refuses to pray for her new brother's good health. When the baby dies soon afterwards, Laura is crushed with guilt, and Reverend Alden advises that she needs to get closer to God. Laura runs away from home and climbs a mountain, where she prays that she should take the place in Heaven of her baby brother so that the baby may come back to life. As Charles and Mr. Edwards search for Laura, she is looked after by Johnathan, a heaven-sent stranger who helps her realize how much she means to her father. Guest cast: Ernest Borgnine as Johnathan
14	14	"Christmas at Plum Creek"	William F. Claxton	Arthur Heinemann	December 25, 1974	1015
When Christmas comes around, the Ingallses are caught up in the secrecy and excitement. Charles and Mary take jobs to obtain gifts for their loved ones, but Laura cannot think of what to give or how to raise money, until she realizes she has something of value in her horse, Bunny, which Nels Oleson wants to buy for Nellie. Christmas Day brings surprises, and Carrie learns the meaning of Christmas.
15	15	"Family Quarrel"	William F. Claxton	Ward Hawkins	15 January 1975	1017
Nels and Harriet Oleson both go too far in what they say during one of their squabbles, and they decide to separate, with Harriet taking the children back east. The Ingallses and other townspeople make various attempts to get them to settle their differences.
16	16	"Doctor's Lady"	Lewis Allen	Story by : Arthur Heinemann and Ann M. Beckett; Teleplay by : Arthur Heinemann	January 22, 1975	1016
When Harriet Oleson's niece, Kate Thorvald, comes to visit, she and Doc Baker fall in love, but Kate has to give him much encouragement to court her. Influenced by the opinions of townspeople, the Doc gives a lot of thought to the age difference between them and wavers between his love for Kate and his concern for what is best for her. When Kate accompanies him on a visit to deliver a baby to a woman whose own birth he had attended, it brings their situation into sharp focus for both of them and leads to the Doc making a difficult decision. Guest cast: Anne Archer as Kate Thorvald
17	17	"Plague"	William F. Claxton	Story by : William Keys and Michael Landon; Teleplay by : Michael Landon	29 January 1975	1019
A typhus outbreak hits Walnut Grove, so Doc Baker advises everyone to stay in isolation in their homes. While out hunting, Charles finds more victims, so, having been exposed, he joins Doc Baker and Reverend Alden, quarantined in the church, which is set up as a makeshift hospital. Later, Charles is devastated to see his friend Mr. Edwards sick with the typhus, but something Edwards says helps Charles and the Doc find the source of the disease: cornmeal that has been contaminated by rats. The sick are treated while the storehouse containing the cornmeal is burned to the ground.
18	18	"Circus Man"	Victor French	Story by : Preston Wood and Ward Hawkins; Teleplay by : Ward Hawkins	5 February 1975	1018
A traveling circus man, 'Willie' O'Hara, with the gift of blarney and sleight of hand skills, persuades Charles to allow him to stay at the farm, where he charms Laura and Mary with his tricks and animals. But when some of the townspeople prefer his 'miracle powders' to Doc Baker's medical treatment, the Doc gets Charles to send O'Hara on his way. Then their dog, Jack, is injured, and Laura is convinced that only O'Hara can heal him, so Charles fetches him back to tell Laura the truth. Guest cast: Red Buttons as William 'Willie' O'Hara
19	19	"Child of Pain"	Victor French	John Meston	12 February 1975	1020
Miss Beadle and Doc Baker discover that a boy in school named Graham Stewart gets beatings from his alcoholic father John, but only when Charles angrily confronts him does the father admit he has a problem and ask for help. The boy stays with the Ingalls family, while Charles undertakes to help rehabilitate his father and break him from his dangerous habit. Guest cast: Harris Yulin as John Stewart, Johnny Lee as Graham Stewart, Wayne Heffley as Mr. Kennedy, and Matt Clark as Boulton
20	20	"Money Crop"	Leo Penn	Story by : John Meston; Teleplay by : Ward Hawkins	19 February 1975	1021
A university-educated farmer named Joseph Coulter convinces the farmers of Walnut Grove to invest in planting a new kind of corn instead of wheat. During his return trip from Minneapolis with the corn-seed, Coulter's wagon runs off the road and crashes down a steep bank. When he is late returning, the farmers become anxious, and some of them cause trouble in town. Charles goes out to look for Coulter, and later the other farmers make amends for their behavior. Guest cast: Alan Fudge as Joseph Coulter
21	21	"Survival"	William F. Claxton	Story by : John Hawkins and Preston Wood; Teleplay by : John Hawkins	February 26, 1975	1022
While returning from a spring family trip to Mankato, the Ingalls family receives a twofold warning from a Federal Marshal Anders: a blizzard is coming, and a dangerous Indian fugitive is on the loose. When they are caught in the blizzard, the family take shelter in an abandoned cabin. Charles nearly freezes to death while out hunting for food, but he is rescued by the Indian fugitive, Jack Lame Horse. Meanwhile, the Marshal has taken shelter with Caroline and the girls, and Charles has the chance to return the favour by saving the fugitive's life. Guest cast: Jack Ging as Marshal Anders, and Robert Tessier as Chief Jack Lame Horse
22	22	"To See the World"	Michael Landon	Gerry Day	5 March 1975	1023
After Johnny Johnson has an argument with his father, he decides to leave "to see the world", having been influenced by Mr. Edwards' tall tales. He gets a ride with Mr. Edwards on a delivery trip to Mankato and gets involved with a poker game and a dance hall girl. Edwards, feeling responsible, uses his own money to finance various schemes to persuade the boy to return home.
23	23	"Founder's Day"	William F. Claxton	Story by : Byron Twiggs and Ward Hawkins; Teleplay by : Ward Hawkins and John Hawkins	7 May 1975	1024
Walnut Grove celebrates Founder's Day, and in the competitions Caroline, Laura, and Mary find themselves up against the Olesons. Charles just wants to be a spectator and tells his girls that it is the taking part that is important, not the winning. But when Charles is annoyed by the attitude of aging lumberjack Jim Tyler, who wants to prove that he is still the "Bull of the Woods", he enters the logging contest determined to win - until he is asked to throw the match to save the old man's pride. Guest cast: Forrest Tucker as Jim Tyler

=== Season 2 (1975–1976) ===
No. overall	No. in season	Title	Directed by	Written by	Original release date	Prod. code
24	1	"The Richest Man in Walnut Grove"	Michael Landon	Michael Landon	September 10, 1975	2001
A major customer goes bankrupt, so Hanson closes the mill and cannot pay Charles two months' back pay, which means Charles cannot pay their large tab at the Mercantile. The family pitches in to help: Mary sews to earn money while Laura does her chores as well as her own, Caroline helps with the farm work, and Charles toils at two jobs. When Charles pays the tab, Mr. Oleson wonders which of them is richer.
25	2	"Four Eyes"	William F. Claxton	B.W. Sandefur	September 17, 1975	2002
Miss Beadle and the Ingalls become concerned about Mary's faltering performance in school, until Charles realizes that she has a problem with her eyesight. Mary is excited when she gets a pair of glasses from Doctor Burke in Mankato, but her excitement fades when Nellie and Willie tease her, even though Miss Beadle also wears glasses. Mary decides to 'lose' her glasses, until she sees Miss Beadle's handsome boyfriend. Guest cast: Ford Rainey as Dr. Burke
26	3	"Ebenezer Sprague"	Victor French	Story by : Ray Goldrup; Teleplay by : Ray Goldrup & John Hawkins & B. W. Sandefur	September 24, 1975	2003
In a twist on Dickens' A Christmas Carol, Laura befriends a stranger, Ebenezer Sprague, while out fishing, and is stunned to discover he is Walnut Grove's self-centered and miserly new banker. However, she is even more surprised when the man accuses her of being kind to him to secure a loan her father wants. Guest cast: Ted Gehring as Ebenezer Sprague
27	4	"In The Big Inning"	William F. Claxton	B.W. Sandefur	October 1, 1975	2008
It is Walnut Grove vs. Sleepy Eye in the annual baseball game. Accustomed to heavy defeats, Walnut Grove believe they now have a star pitcher in mild-mannered Jebediah Mumfort, but his domineering wife threatens to disrupt things until Caroline comes up with a plan. A hard-fought game, which includes foul play and underhand tactics by Sleepy Eye, comes to a dramatic climax. Guest cast: Karl Lukas as Jebediah Mumfort
28	5	"Haunted House"	Victor French	Story by : Joseph Bonaduce; Teleplay by : Gerry Day	October 8, 1975	2007
Although many in Walnut Grove think he's a homicidal maniac who lives in a haunted house, Laura befriends mysterious hermit Amos Pike and discovers the truth behind the rumors and the old man's reclusive life. Guest cast: John Anderson as Amos Pike
29	6	"The Spring Dance"	William F. Claxton	Gerry Day	October 29, 1975	2004
Laura and Grace Snider need dates for the annual Spring Dance, but those they have their eyes on seem not to be interested. Caroline shares a 'womanly wile' she used on Charles to get his attention, but when Laura and Grace try it the consequences are not what they had hoped for. Then Charles reminds Caroline of what actually happened when she tried it on him, and she changes her advice to Laura and Grace, with a happier outcome.
30	7	"Remember Me"	Michael Landon	Michael Landon	November 5, 1975	2009
31	8	"Remember Me"	Michael Landon	Michael Landon	November 12, 1975	2010
Part 1: Widowed mother Julia Sanderson learns she has a terminal illness and, with no close relatives to care for her three children, John Jr., Carl, and Alicia, she gets Charles to promise to find the children a home after she dies. Meanwhile, Laura and Mary rescue some abandoned puppies, and the relationship between Mr. Edwards and Grace Snider begins to blossom. Part 2: After Julia Sanderson's death, her three children stay with Grace, with help from Mr. Edwards. When Charles is unable to find someone to adopt all three children, he has to make the difficult decision to place them in separate homes. At the last minute, Mr. Edwards makes a monumental decision: he marries Grace - and they take all three children. Guest cast: Patricia Neal as Julia Sanderson, Radames Pera as John Sanderson, Brian Part as Carl Sanderson and Kyle Richards as Alicia Sanderson
32	9	"The Campout"	Gerry Day	William F. Claxton	November 19, 1975	2006
The Olesons get invited onto the Ingalls family campout after Nellie complains that it will give Laura and Mary an advantage for the school holiday project of leaf-collecting. The two men bond while fishing and their wives try to improve their relationship, but the children clash. However, when Nellie falls into a river, her later false account of what happened brings out the same Mrs. Oleson. Back at the school, the result of the leaves project gives some satisfaction to Laura and Mary.
33	10	"At The End of the Rainbow"	Michael Landon	Arthur Heinemann	December 10, 1975	2005
While Laura is fishing with her new friend Jonah, they think they have discovered gold. They resolve to keep it a secret, especially from Nellie and Willie, and the two spend all their spare time digging it out. Laura fantasizes about her family being very, very rich - and the Olesons being dirt-poor. When the friends take it to the bank for safe keeping, Mr. Sprague delivers unwelcome news.
34	11	"The Gift"	William F. Claxton	Rocci Chatfield	December 17, 1975	2013
The children of Walnut Grove pool their money to buy Reverend Alden a birthday gift and entrust Mary with the cash. Laura persuades Mary to use the money to try to make more money and enable them to buy a better gift. After a lot of effort for no returns, they have to tell Reverend Alden what they have done. In church on his birthday, the Reverend finds a silver lining to the cloud over Mary and Laura's heads.
35	12	"His Father's Son"	Michael Landon	Michael Landon	January 7, 1976	2015
Mr. Edwards wants to bond with his son, John Jr., and buys him a rifle for his birthday so that he can pass on to him his skills in hunting. In fact, John Jr. doesn't want to kill animals and prefers reading and writing poetry, but Mr. Edwards is reluctant to accept that and insists they go on a hunting trip. During the trip, things do not go as planned, but a frightening encounter leads to Mr. Edwards and John Jr. becoming closer.
36	13	"The Talking Machine"	Victor French	Harold Swanton	January 14, 1976	2012
Laura and Nellie vie for the affections of a new schoolboy named Jason, who has a keen interest in science. When Jason chooses to spend time with Laura rather than Nellie, even with the advantage of her new "talking machine", Nellie uses the machine to get back at Laura. When Charles tells Nels what Nellie did, he takes drastic action. Later, at school, there is a happy ending for Laura and Jason. Guest cast: Eric Shea as Jason
37	14	"The Pride of Walnut Grove"	William F. Claxton	Arthur Heinemann	January 28, 1976	2014
Mary wins a place in a statewide math competition, but when Charles cannot afford the cost of the trip to Minneapolis for her and Caroline, Laura is pleased to play a role in getting the town council to foot the bill. However, this causes Mary to worry she will let down the whole town if she fails to win, but her return to Walnut Grove dispels her fears. With her Ma away, Laura keeps the home fires burning! Guest cast: Beth Howland as Clerk, Rick Segall as Small Boy, and John Howard as Hiram Potter
38	15	"A Matter of Faith"	William F. Claxton	B.W. Sandefur	February 4, 1976	2011
Charles and the girls go on a camping trip, with Caroline planning to join them later. Previously, Caroline had scratched her leg on a piece of baling wire, and the minor scratch turns into a serious infection. Unable to summon help, she is about to succumb to her illness, but she is inspired by a passage in her Bible to perform a painful procedure, which later impresses even Doc Baker.
39	16	"The Runaway Caboose"	William F. Claxton	Story by : Ernie Durham; Teleplay by : John Hawkins and Ernie Durham	February 11, 1976	2016
Inspired by learning about the railroads at school, Mary, Laura, and Carl resort to underhand tactics to join their fathers on a haulage trip to Springfield, so that they can see real trains. At the train station, the children's curiosity takes them too far and they find themselves in a runaway caboose. Charles and Mr. Edwards set off on a race against time to prevent a head-on collision with another train.
40	17	"Troublemaker"	Victor French	John Hawkins	February 25, 1976	2019
Miss Beadle is relieved of her duties as schoolmistress when the schoolboard decide she cannot control the older students. In her place, they appoint Hannibal Applewood, a strict disciplinarian. Influenced by Mrs. Oleson's gossip, Mr. Applewood treats Laura unfairly as the class troublemaker. When the other students fight back and feelings run high, Charles convinces the rest of the town council to think twice. Guest cast: Richard Basehart as Hannibal Applewood
41	18	"The Long Road Home"	Michael Landon	John Hawkins	March 3, 1976	2017
When a bumper harvest causes a huge fall in the price of their wheat, Charles and Mr. Edwards take very well-paid jobs freighting highly explosive blasting oil for railroad construction. Traveling with them are a black man, Henry Hill, who has done the job many times before, and a white man, Murphy, who is prejudicial against those of color. Rough roads and bandits are just some of the problems the four men have to deal with. Guest cast: Louis Gossett Jr. as Henry Hill, and Richard Jaeckel as Murphy
42	19	"For My Lady"	William F. Claxton	B.W. Sandefur	March 10, 1976	2020
To buy Caroline a new set of china, Charles secretly takes a woodworking job for attractive young widow Elizabeth Thurmond. However, Mrs. Oleson's gossip plants a suggestion in Caroline's mind that there is more going on than woodworking behind closed doors. Laura and Mary have their own suspicions and decide they need to try to "win Pa back" with plans of their own. Guest cast: Mariette Hartley as Elizabeth Thurmond
43	20	"Centennial"	William F. Claxton	John Hawkins	March 17, 1976	2018
It is 1876 and Walnut Grove prepares to celebrate the nation's centennial, for which Laura and Mary are making a flag. However, the party is threatened when the state taxes are increased to pay for a road construction scheme. Meanwhile, a Russian immigrant, Yuli Pyatakov, receives an unexpected large bill for back-taxes on his new farm. An impassioned speech about the freedoms they enjoy inspires the town to go ahead with the celebrations. Guest cast: Theodore Bikel as Yuli Pyatakov, William Schallert as Snell. Historical inaccuracies: The band plays America the Beautiful during the flag raising, but Katharine Lee Bates' poem was written 19 years later in 1895. Yuli mentions moving to South Dakota which was still called Dakota Territory, not having achieved statehood until 1889.
44	21	"Soldier's Return"	William F. Claxton	B.W. Sandefur	March 24, 1976	2022
Mrs. Whipple's son, Granville, returns to Walnut Grove from Philadelphia where he was an orchestral musician. He sets up as a music teacher and soon has many pupils, including Nellie and Mary. However, an encounter with the son of a man with whom he served in the Civil War brings back painful memories of that time, leading him to relapse into a dangerous addiction. Guest cast: Richard Mulligan as Granville Whipple
45	22	"Going Home"	Michael Landon	Michael Landon	March 31, 1976	2021
When a tornado hits, Charles loses his wheat crop and the house and farm buildings are badly damaged. A despondent Charles decides to move the family back to Wisconsin, and he agrees a sale to an elderly couple who had owned the property previously. A crushed Laura prays with the Reverend for Charles to find the strength for them to somehow stay in Walnut Grove. Meanwhile, Mary and John are discovering they have feelings for each other. Guest cast: E. J. André as Matthew Simms, and Lurene Tuttle as Anna Simms

=== Season 3 (1976–1977) ===
No. overall	No. in season	Title	Directed by	Written by	Original release date	Prod. code
46	1	"The Collection"	Michael Landon	Arthur Heinemann	September 27, 1976	3008
Reverend Alden gets badly hurt while on his way to collect donations for a struggling town in another part of his parish. Caleb Hodgekiss, an ex-convict, finds him and takes him to his house where his wife Mattie takes care of him. Caleb volunteers to get the donations from Walnut Grove, but plans to take the donations for himself. However, his experiences with the people of Walnut Grove, especially Mary, bring about a change of heart. Guest cast: Johnny Cash as Caleb Hodgekiss, and June Carter Cash as Mattie Hodgekiss
47	2	"Bunny"	Michael Landon	Michael Landon	October 4, 1976	3001
Nellie has been mistreating Bunny, who was Laura's horse until she sold it to Mr. Oleson (in "Christmas at Plum Creek"). When Nellie falls off the horse and appears to be seriously injured, Mrs. Oleson blames Laura and wants Bunny to be killed, so Laura takes Bunny and hides her. Nellie exploits Laura's guilty feelings, but then Laura makes a discovery which leads to a comeuppance for Nellie, and Bunny becomes Laura's horse again.
48	3	"The Race"	William F. Claxton	John V. Hanrahan	October 11, 1976	3005
In the Hero Township horse race, Laura and her horse Bunny go head-to-head with Nellie and her new Thoroughbred, which Mrs. Oleson has bought for her, against the wishes of Nels. Laura has to battle all kinds of adversity and needs a pep-talk from her Pa when she begins to feel sorry for herself. However, Nellie does not properly prepare for the race, so the stage is set for a close finish.
49	4	"Little Girl Lost"	Michael Landon	Paul W. Cooper	October 18, 1976	3006
Carrie goes along with Laura and Mary when they go out collecting insects for a school project, but Carrie wanders off and falls into an abandoned mine shaft. As the townspeople battle to find a way to rescue her, Lars Hanson clashes with the man he blames for the death of the woman he loved. Guest cast: John Ireland as Wendell Loudy
50	5	"The Monster of Walnut Grove"	William F. Claxton	John Hawkins	November 1, 1976	3007
Laura's imagination runs wild on Halloween when she sees Nels apparently cutting off Mrs. Oleson's head, but only Carl will believe her. Laura makes the mistake of telling Nellie and Willie, and they have some fun at Laura's expense.
51	6	"Journey in the Spring"	Michael Landon	Michael Landon	November 15, 1976	3011
52	7	"Journey in the Spring"	Michael Landon	Michael Landon	November 22, 1976	3012
Part 1: When Charles's mother, Laura Colby Ingalls passes away, he travels to Wisconsin and persuades his father, Lansford Ingalls, to go back with him to Walnut Grove. While staying with Charles and his family, Lansford begins to form a special relationship with his granddaughter Laura, and this is strengthened when he tells Laura that she was named after her grandmother, Lansford's wife. Part 2:Laura continues to remind her grandfather Lansford of his deceased wife, and their relationship continues to grow. However, it falls into jeopardy when Bunny, Laura's horse, is badly injured and has to be put down. Laura's grief becomes anger against Lansford, which makes him go away without warning, but that brings about a change of heart in a repentant Laura. Guest cast: Matthew Labyorteaux as young Charles Ingalls, Jan Sterling as Laura Colby Ingalls, and Arthur Hill as Lansford Ingalls
53	8	"Fred"	William F. Claxton	Robert Vincent Wright	November 29, 1976	3002
Laura is tricked into adopting a "unique" billy goat, named Fred, but he quickly becomes unpopular when he helps himself to the Ingalls family's crops and exhibits a particularly unpopular behaviour. Laura is instructed to get rid of her new pet, but that proves to be difficult. Guest cast: Don "Red" Barry as Rufe Parsons
54	9	"The Bully Boys"	Victor French	B.W. Sandefur	December 6, 1976	3009
The Galender brothers settle in Walnut Grove, causing trouble for the entire community by intimidating and terrorizing the inhabitants. When Caroline becomes one of their victims, Charles decides to take action. Guest cast: Geoffrey Lewis as Sam Galender, Michael LeClair as Bubba Galender, Rayford Barnes as Bert Henderson, and Roy Jenson as George Galender
55	10	"The Hunters"	Michael Landon	Harold Swanton	December 20, 1976	3003
Charles is badly wounded while on a hunting trip with Laura. The only person she can find to help her is Sam Shelby, who is almost blind, but still able to find his way in the forest. Together, they manage to get Charles to Sam's cabin and then they go out to find medical help. Guest cast: Burl Ives as Sam Shelby
56	11	"Blizzard"	William F. Claxton	Paul W. Cooper	December 27, 1976	3013
When a serious snowstorm threatens to strand the children in the schoolhouse on the last day before Christmas vacation, Miss Beadle dismisses the children early. Unfortunately, many are unable to get home and the men of Walnut Grove must organize a search party. But for one particular family, it will not be a merry Christmas.
57	12	"I'll Ride the Wind"	William F. Claxton	Paul W. Cooper	January 10, 1977	3010
John is offered a scholarship in Chicago that will allow him to live his dream of becoming a writer. This causes Mary and John much heartache, as they must decide whether to remain together or risk a separation for the sake of John's career.
58	13	"Quarantine"	Victor French	John Hawkins	January 17, 1977	3015
Mr. Edwards and Doc Baker provide help to a nearby town during a mountain fever epidemic. When Mr. Edwards returns, Walnut Grove is placed under quarantine and Alicia, Mr. Edwards' daughter, becomes ill with the disease. Laura, unaware of the danger, visits the Edwards' home and helps nurse her friend back to health. Guest cast: Richard Farnsworth as Wall
59	14	"Little Women"	William F. Claxton	Dale Eunson	January 24, 1977	3014
While Laura and Mary prepare a play for school with Ginny Clark, they learn that Ginny wants her mother, who is a single parent, to date again. Ginny decides to use the play to help her mom gain the confidence necessary to meet new people.
60	15	"Injun Kid"	Victor French	Arthur Heinemann	January 31, 1977	3004
After the death of his father, Joseph Stokes, the mixed-race son of a Sioux Indian and a white woman, moves to Walnut Grove. Joseph and his mother move in with her father, Jeremy. However, the old man rejects Joseph because he feels angry and ashamed that his daughter married an Indian. After Joseph gets attacked by bullies in an effort to keep him out of school, his grandfather has a change of heart and shows up at the school to defend Joseph's attendance and asks that his true (native) name be used. Guest cast: Willie Aames as Seth Johnson, and George Murdock as Jeremy Stokes
61	16	"To Live with Fear"	William F. Claxton	B.W. Sandefur	February 14, 1977	3016
62	17	"To Live with Fear"	William F. Claxton	John Hawkins	February 21, 1977	3017
Part 1: Mary is severely injured when a horse kicks her in the stomach while she is putting him away in the barn. When her condition deteriorates, it becomes clear she needs an expensive surgery to save her life. Charles and Mr. Edwards are forced to take dynamiting jobs for the railroad to fund the surgery. Part 2:Mary needs more surgery, something that weighs heavily on Charles's mind as he feverishly works to earn enough money for his daughter's surgery. Eventually, a fatigued Charles causes an accident that traps him and a co-worker inside. Mr. Edwards leads a harried but courageous effort to save the two men's lives. Guest cast: James B. Sikking as Mr. Franklin, and Ivan Bonar as Dr. Mayes
63	18	"The Wisdom of Solomon"	William F. Claxton	Scott Swanton	March 7, 1977	3019
Solomon Henry, an 11-year-old black boy, runs away from his family because he is tired of being treated differently. He lives with the Ingalls family for a while and during his stay is pleased to be able to attend school. Guest cast: Todd Bridges as Solomon Henry
64	19	"The Music Box"	Michael Landon	Robert Janes	March 14, 1977	3020
Nellie discovers that Laura has "borrowed" a music box from her room and decides to blackmail her. In order to stay quiet about Laura's crime, Nellie demands that Laura abandon her new friend Anna Gillberg, who has a stutter, and join her new club. Eventually, Charles discovers what happens and teaches Laura a lesson about lying. In the end, Nellie gets her comeuppance, as well. Guest cast: Katy Kurtzman as Anna Gillberg
65	20	"The Election"	Victor French	B.W. Sandefur	March 21, 1977	3018
The school holds an election for school president. Mary, Nellie and Elmer (Eric Olson), an unpopular boy amongst the children, are in the running. Mary drops out of the race when she realizes Elmer is the best person for the job.
66	21	"Gold Country"	Michael Landon	John Hawkins & B.W. Sandefur	April 4, 1977 (Note: Gold Country originally aired as a single episode with a 120 minute runtime. It may air as two parts in syndication or on DVD sets.)	3021
When heavy rains make it impossible to plant their crops, the Ingalls and Edwards families head west to pan for gold. The promise of becoming rich is realized by only a lucky few, which leads to ill-feeling, lawlessness and even deaths. Laura and Carl come across an ex-miner who has seen the ill-effects of the search for gold and lives like a hermit. Eventually, seeing the bad effect it is having on others, Charles and Mr. Edwards realize that they have riches enough, in the shape of their loving families, and they decide to go home.

=== Season 4 (1977–1978) ===
No. overall	No. in season	Title	Directed by	Written by	Original release date	Prod. code
67	1	"Castoffs"	Michael Landon	Tony Kayden	September 12, 1977	4003
Caroline orders Laura to care for her dog, Jack, before going to town to greet a newcomer, Kezia Horn. Laura becomes frustrated with Jack and gives up trying to take the foxtails out of his ears. Mary, Laura, Nellie, and Willie visit Kezia and find out what a unique yet kind person she is. When Laura arrives home, she finds Jack dead in the barn. Charles assumes Jack knew his time was coming and decided to spare everyone the sadness of watching him die, but Laura feels guilty. Later, Charles brings home a stray dog (Bandit) that followed him home from Mankato, but Laura refuses to bond with the dog, still grieving the loss of Jack. Kezia tells Laura the dog only wants to love her and how she also wants to love others but hasn't been accepted. Guilt-ridden Laura runs to find Bandit and bonds with him. Kezia decides to leave Walnut Grove because no one is accepting of her and it is up to Laura to get everyone to change their minds before it is too late. In the end, Reverend Alden gives a sermon comparing casting off Bandit and Kezia with casting off Jesus. Kezia stays, as does Bandit. Guest cast: Hermione Baddeley as Kezia Horn
68	2	"Times of Change"	William F. Claxton	Carole & Michael Raschella	September 19, 1977	4002
Charles takes Mary to Chicago, where he is attending the Grange Convention. There, Mary meets up with John Jr., who has started a job as a cub reporter for a newspaper. Former lovebirds John and Mary soon find their lives headed in separate directions, especially for John Jr., who has a new girlfriend. Meanwhile Charles has problems with the corruption he witnesses at the Grange meetings.
69	3	"My Ellen"	Michael Landon	Michael Landon	September 26, 1977	4007
When Laura and Mary go skinny-dipping with their friend, Ellen Taylor, some boys come by to get a glimpse. The girls all hide underwater until they go away. Laura and Mary come back up, but Ellen becomes trapped under the surface; she drowns as a result. After the funeral, Ellen's grief-stricken mother blames Laura for the tragedy and rebuffs the efforts of several people to cheer her up. When Laura pays a visit to Mrs. Taylor, she tricks Laura and traps her in the basement, because in her grief she deliriously imagines that Laura is her daughter Ellen. Laura's things are found outside the house of Busby, a mentally challenged and disfigured man whom Charles had warned his daughters to stay away from, and suspicion falls on him. While the hunt is on for Busby, Laura must rely on her wits to escape Mrs. Taylor's clutches and help her come to terms with Ellen's death, which she is finally able to accomplish along with help and support from her husband. The men realize that they were wrong about Busby, and Laura later gives Busby a picture book.
70	4	"The Handyman"	William F. Claxton	Arthur Heinemann	October 3, 1977	4004
After Caroline complains about the small size of her kitchen, Charles decides to build an addition onto the house, but after starting the work he has to leave to take a rush delivery to Mankato. Caroline hires a handsome young handyman named Chris Nelson to complete the job. Chris stays with the Ingalls family and unwittingly becomes head of the household in Charles's absence, prompting Carrie to mistakenly call the man "Uncle Chris." Mary soon becomes convinced that her Ma and Chris are becoming romantically involved, and she freely expresses her opinions. Nellie and Mrs. Oleson don't help matters when they share Mary's suspicions. Eventually, Mary confronts Chris with her suspicions and tells him he must leave, only to find out later it was a misunderstanding. Charles later returns and finishes the new kitchen. Guest cast: Hermione Baddeley as Kezia, and Gil Gerard as Chris Nelson
71	5	"The Wolves"	Michael Landon	Lawrence M. Konner	October 17, 1977	4005
Laura and her new friend, Andy Garvey, find an injured mother wolf trying to tend to her litter of cubs. Andy takes the wolf and her babies home to care for them. He decides to move them to the Ingalls family barn when he learns farmer Jud Larabee wants to shoot them, believing that they are the ones responsible for killing several of his sheep. Things turn deadly when a pack of feral dogs advance on the barn, trapping Andy, Laura, Mary, Carrie, and Bandit inside, leaving them to rely on Jonathan, and even more so, Bandit and the mother wolf, to save them from being mauled.
72	6	"The Creeper of Walnut Grove"	William F. Claxton	John T. Dugan	October 24, 1977	4006
Laura and Andy become detectives to solve a series of burglaries in Walnut Grove. After an incident at the Olesons', Charles becomes very angry with Laura. Things get worse when Laura sets some traps to catch the culprit, but winds up catching Charles instead (at one point, causing him to be doused with green paint). Eventually, it is discovered that a boy named Timothy Ferrel was the burglar all along, stealing to support himself and his ill father.
73	7	"To Run and Hide"	Michael Landon	John T. Dugan	October 31, 1977	4001
When Dr. Baker is unable to save a patient, he feels it was due to his incompetence and resigns as Walnut Grove's doctor. While he tries his hand at farming, a new physician, Dr. Logan, accepts a call to replace him. However, Dr. Logan proves to be ill-tempered and has no compassion for his patients, prompting Charles to go all out to convince Dr. Baker that he really is a good doctor and that the people of Hero Township need him.
74	8	"The Aftermath"	William F. Claxton	Don Balluck	November 7, 1977	4008
Outlaws Frank and Jesse James bring their trail of treachery to Walnut Grove. They stake out the town and assume aliases while trying to blend into the background, even hiring Mary to do their work. Their cover is soon blown when a posse arrives to arrest the James brothers, causing them to take Mary hostage. Guest cast: John Bennett Perry as Frank James, and Dennis Rucker as Jesse James.
75	9	"The High Cost of Being Right"	Michael Landon	Don Balluck	November 14, 1977	4009
When the Garveys' barn burns down and they lose their entire harvest, Alice wants to take a job at the post office to bring in some money, but Jonathan believes that it is a man's role to support his family and forbids it. Their disagreement grows to the point where they intend to divorce. However, as they appear before the judge, Charles helps them realize that their love for each other is more important than their differences, and they are reconciled.
76	10	"The Fighter"	Michael Landon	Lawrence Konner	November 21, 1977	4011
When boxer Joe Kagan's career seems to be going nowhere, he chooses to continue boxing rather than keep his family with him. Unable to compete in the professional circuit, he travels to small towns and takes challengers for money. While he is stricken with medical problems, a fight with Charles Ingalls ends his career. After being nursed back to health by Charles, Joe decides to stay in Walnut Grove and make a new living as a farmer. He then finds that his own estranged son is now trying to become a boxer. Now, Joe's biggest challenge is to figure out how to keep his son from making the same mistake he did.
77	11	"Meet Me at the Fair"	William F. Claxton	Bradley Berwick, Ray Berwick & Arthur Heinemann	November 28, 1977	4012
The Oleson and Ingalls families travel to a fair, where Mary hopes to spend time with a boy, Patrick. Instead, she falls for the flattery of Cass, a balloonist and Patrick's worldly employer. Elsewhere, Caroline and Mrs Oleson find they are rivals, Nels and Charles join forces to enter a donkey-riding contest, and Laura quickly loses all her spending money and then has trouble trying to stay with both Carrie and Bandit. Carrie wanders off, falls asleep inside a hot-air balloon basket and wakes up to find herself flying. Patrick helps to rescue her, and Mary finally chooses him over Cass.
78	12	"Here Come the Brides"	William F. Claxton	John T. Dugan & Robert F. Metzler	December 5, 1977	4010
When Adam Simms and his shoeless son Luke move to town, Adam instantly takes a liking to Miss Eva Beadle, while Luke and Nellie fall in love. After Nellie talks with Miss Beadle, she and Luke run away to have a short-lived marriage (about 10 minutes). In the end, Adam and Eva themselves marry, not only uniting them through their symbolic names, but causing now-Mrs. Eva Simms to become a stepmother, though annoying the officiator and his wife to no end at the ungodly hour they were awakened. Guest cast: Joshua Bryant as Adam Simms, Bob Marsic as Luke Simms, Ivor Francis as Varnum, and Montana Smoyer as Philomena
79	13	"Freedom Flight"	Michael Landon	Ron Chiniquy, Richalene Kelsay	December 12, 1977	4013
An Indian tribe comes to Walnut Grove asking for medical help for their sick chief. Doc Baker agrees to help and Charles goes with him, but they are opposed by a group of citizens who have memories of relatives and neighbors who were killed by Indians and want to take revenge and attack them. However, the tribe moves on, except that Charles hides the tribe leader at his farm while he recovers. When their secret is discovered, Charles and the Doc help the chief and his family rejoin their tribe and make good their escape.
80	14	"The Rivals"	William F. Claxton	Hindi Brooks	January 9, 1978	4014
Charles and Jonathan compete against another team to win a freighting contract. Laura feels the first stirrings of attraction to a boy named Jimmy Hill with whom she has previously enjoyed playing baseball and going fishing, but he does not respond in the same way. When a new girl arrives in school who looks like a rival, Laura decides she must compete for him by giving up her 'tom-boy' behavior and becoming more like Nellie. Charles and Jonathan unexpectedly win the freighting contract, but, as they celebrate and make big plans, they realize that it would involve them not seeing their families for long stretches of time, so they refuse the contract. When Laura's new strategy does not work, her Ma persuades her that she should be true to her real self. Eventually, Jimmy does notice her as a girl, and Laura has her first kiss with a boy.
81	15	"Whisper Country"	Michael Landon	John Hawkins	January 16, 1978	4015
Mary gets her first teaching job in the backwoods community of Willow Prairie, but she is met with stern opposition from Ms. Rachel Peel, an elderly woman who has thwarted a previous attempt to establish a school and justifies her actions with a flawed understanding of the Bible. The husband, Caleb Fisher, in the family that gives Mary accommodation has the same harsh beliefs and is also hostile towards Mary. After one of Mary's students tries to kiss her and she hits him to stop him, Rachel accuses Mary of being a Jezebel, and, feeling outnumbered, Mary retreats home. However, after a talk with her father, she goes back with Charles, and at a church meeting Mary takes on her opponents, and it emerges that Miss Peel cannot read, which is why she misquotes the Bible. As they all sing a hymn, Miss Peel accepts the hand of friendship that Mary offers to her. Guest cast: Anita Dangler as Miss Rachel Peel, Sandy McPeak as Jacob Bond and John McLiam as Caleb Fisher
82	16	"I Remember, I Remember"	William F. Claxton	Arthur Heinemann	January 23, 1978	4016
On Charles's and Caroline's anniversary, Charles is stuck on the road in the rain with a broken wagon wheel, making him late home for their celebration meal. While they are waiting, Caroline tells the children the story of how she and Charles met, eventually revealing that she learned that he always has a good reason for keeping her waiting. In flashback: the day they met, Charles's troubles in school, and their first dance. Guest cast: Matthew Labyorteaux as young Charles Ingalls, and Sorrell Booke as Mr. Watson, the teacher.
83	17	"Be My Friend"	Michael Landon	Michael Landon	January 30, 1978	4017
While out fishing, Laura finds a bottle in the creek with a note inside that reads "Be my friend." She eventually persuades Charles to help her look for the writer of the note, but instead they find an abandoned baby. Laura looks after the baby, whom she names Grace, while Charles tries to find the parents. Charles first locates the young father, Bobbie, and together they find the mother who is his beloved, Anna. They had wanted to marry but she was taken away by her strictly religious father who is deeply embittered because his wife went off with another man. Fearing his reaction, Anna had managed to keep secret that she was pregnant and even that she had given birth, but then realized that she could not keep the baby while staying with her father. Bobbie takes Anna back with him, while her father chooses to stay alone in the woods. Anna is reunited with her baby, telling Laura she will keep the name Grace.
84	18	"The Inheritance"	William F. Claxton	Arthur Heinemann	February 6, 1978	4018
A lawyer visits to tell Charles that he is the heir to the extensive estate of his late Uncle Ned, who owned a business— Ingalls Carriage Company —and a large house in St Louis. Mrs. Oleson is suddenly keen to socialize with them, and other people treat them differently as well. Charles and Caroline uncharacteristically (and somewhat unwillingly) run up a large debt at the Oleson Mercantile. When the lawyer returns after winding up the estate, he explains to Charles that, because of Uncle Ned's eccentric and profligate lifestyle, his whole estate was eaten up by debts and legal costs, and all that is left is a box containing worthless Confederate banknotes. Mrs. Oleson immediately forecloses on the Ingalls farm, but their friends in town come up with a plan to help them keep it. Meanwhile, Laura and Andy use the Confederate money to decorate the inside walls of their new clubhouse. Guest cast: Allan Rich as Otto Ripley, Michael Prince as Roger Whitehead, and Michael Flanagan as Harvey Woods.
85	19	"The Stranger"	Michael Landon	Arthur Heinemann	February 13, 1978	4019
Nels' well-to-do city cousin sends his 12-year-old son, Peter, to Walnut Grove after the boy's behavior grows unmanageable. Mrs. Oleson babies the boy, sending him to school in a fancy suit which invites bullying. Peter breaks the Oleson's window in anger. A frustrated Nels arranges for Charles to put the boy to hard work on his farm and sleep in a hayloft. He learns to swim in a pond. Peter thrives and is reconciled with his remorseful father when he returns.
86	20	"A Most Precious Gift"	Michael Landon	Carole Raschella and Michael Raschella	February 27, 1978	4020
Charles has always wanted a son, and has another chance to get one when Caroline announces she's pregnant. But Caroline fears how Charles will react if the baby is a girl, especially after Mrs. Beadle-Simms has a boy herself. Eventually, it's all for nothing, as Charles loves his baby Grace just the same.
87	21	"I'll Be Waving as You Drive Away"	William F. Claxton	Carole Raschella and Michael Raschella	March 6, 1978	4021
88	22	"I'll Be Waving as You Drive Away"	William F. Claxton	Carole Raschella and Michael Raschella	March 13, 1978	4022
Part 1: Just as Mary falls in love with newcomer Seth Barton, her nearsightedness begins to worsen. Charles takes her to an optometrist, Dr. Burke, and she initially appears to need stronger lenses, but the vision still worsens a few days later. She returns to the eye doctor, who discovers she had scarlet fever a few years back. The resulting nerve damage means Mary's vision cannot be saved, and she will soon go blind. In denial, Charles does not tell his daughter until a few days before she wakes up and finds, to her horror, she is completely blind. Mary becomes bitter over her predicament and having to rely on others for basic needs. Her parents decide to send her off to a blind school in Iowa. Meanwhile, Charles, Jonathan Garvey, and the rest of the town of Walnut Grove have another problem as the whole township is threatened by an escalation of a dispute between The Grange and the railroads. This prevents crops and other items from being sold and traded, and disables the bank, causing financial problems for the entire town. The outlook for the town is bleak. At the end of the episode, Charles drives Mary to the blind school where she will spend the next few months. Part 2: Mary, who has recently gone blind, is sent to a blind school in Iowa, where she meets Adam Kendall. Mary refuses to accept Adam's help at first, but he eventually helps her learn to deal with her blindness and a relationship blossoms between the two. Adam reveals to Mary that he is also blind. He is soon leaving this large blind school to accept a better teaching position at a smaller school in Winoka. He invites Mary to come with him and teach there as well. She returns to Walnut Grove temporarily in order to say goodbye. Meanwhile, in Walnut Grove, due to an escalation of the dispute, the school closes for the summer with no plans to reopen next fall, and the teacher, Mrs. Beadle-Simms, and her husband make the decision to leave Walnut Grove. Charles and Caroline decide to also move to Winoka in order to be near Mary. They vacate their home and farm without even putting it up for sale, since no one would buy it anyway considering the shape Walnut Grove is in. The Garveys follow suit. The Olesons prepare to move also and close the mercantile. At the last church service, Mary shares her testimony with the congregation. She has accepted her condition and is ready to go on with her new life with Adam in Winoka. Guest cast: Ford Rainey as Dr. Burke

=== Season 5 (1978–1979) ===
No. overall	No. in season	Title	Directed by	Written by	Original release date	Prod. code
89	1	"As Long as We're Together"	Michael Landon	Michael Landon	September 11, 1978	5001
90	2	"As Long as We're Together"	Michael Landon	Michael Landon	September 18, 1978	5002
Part 1: Picking up where the previous season left off, the Ingalls family moves to Winoka, where Mary teaches at a new blind school established by Adam Kendall. Charles takes a maintenance job at a hotel owned by a despotic local businessman, Mr. Standish. Caroline takes a job as a cook and waitress at the hotel restaurant. The family moves into the hotel. Charles is disgusted by the noisy saloon and its foul-mouthed patrons. The Garveys arrive and move in right behind the Ingalls family, though Jonathan initially cannot find a job. The Olesons surprise the Ingalls and Garvey families when they move to Winoka as well. Nels takes a job at the saloon and they move into the rooming house next door, all of which are also owned by Standish. Part 2: The former Walnut Grove residents continue to adapt to life in Winoka. Charles and Caroline manage The Dakota Hotel; Nels and Jonathan Garvey are working in the saloon; and Alice Garvey starts a school in a livery stable since the public school burned down and the only other school in town is an expensive private academy. Mrs. Oleson refuses to send her children to school in a barn. She enrolls them at the Winoka Prep School, much to Mr. Oleson's dismay. He insists that Harriet pay for it herself by getting a job, which she does- as a barmaid at Standish's bar. A homeless orphan named Albert, whom Laura encountered in the previous episode, continues a life of panhandling, shoe shining, and stealing. Charles and Caroline discuss buying an expensive hat for Mary's 16th birthday. Laura writes Mary a card in Braille. When Standish refuses to give Charles a pay advance, he sells his fiddle to get enough money for the hat without telling Caroline. Caroline sees it in the store window on her way to the hat shop. At Mary's surprise birthday party, she reveals that her "gift" from Charles and Caroline is not the hat, but her Pa's fiddle, and Mary says that the best birthday present she could have is hearing Pa play. Mary expresses her feelings for Laura when she reads the Braille card. When it's time to make a wish and blow out the candles, everyone is brought to tears when Mary says, "I have nothing to wish for! I have everything in the world right here in this room!" Albert appears and is welcomed at Mary's party. Guest cast: Anne Ramsey as Mrs. Schiller
91	3	"The Winoka Warriors"	William F. Claxton	John T. Dugan	September 25, 1978	5003
Charles convinces Albert to attend the livery school. With Jonathan as coach, Albert and the livery school's football team challenge the private academy's undefeated football team. Both sides attempt to unbalance the game in their own favor. When it seems all is lost for the livery school, help comes from an unexpected place in the form of one of Adam's blind students.
92	4	"The Man Inside"	Michael Landon	Michael Landon	October 2, 1978	5004
Laura makes friends with shy classmate Amelia Bevins, but winds up jeopardizing the friendship when she makes fun of an obese man, not knowing he is Amelia's father John. Overhearing that his daughter is ashamed of him, John tells his family that he got a job out of town, but instead sleeps in a storeroom in the blind school, where he works. John's ruse is exposed once he is seriously injured at the school. Guest cast: Julie Anne Haddock as Amelia Bevins, and Cliff Emmich as John Bevins
93	5	"There's No Place Like Home"	Michael Landon	Michael Landon	October 9, 1978	5007
94	6	"There's No Place Like Home"	William F. Claxton	Michael Landon	October 16, 1978	5008
Part 1: Laura is unfairly blamed in a conflict with Mr. Standish's son, which only serves to increase Charles's dislike of Winoka. Charles and Caroline discuss moving back to Walnut Grove, but Charles does not want to leave Mary. After Laura argues with Mr. Standish, he threatens Charles's job if Laura does one more thing against him or his son. A happy-go-lucky man, Toby Noe, is exploited by Standish and gambles away all his lottery winnings. His final losing bet is for crates of fireworks he had ordered for an Independence Day celebration in defiance of Standish's wishes. Jonathan Garvey loses his job for trying (unsuccessfully) to stop Toby from gambling away his windfall. Mary encourages the family to move back to Walnut Grove, explaining that she is an adult now and must seek her own path in life. The decision is made. The Olesons and the Garveys decide to move home as well. Standish's son accidentally sets off the fireworks that Standish intends to return after canceling Toby's fireworks show. The saloon burns to the ground. Part 2: The Ingalls, Oleson, and Garvey families are all set to return home. Charles talks Albert into joining them. The families return home to Walnut Grove, only to find the town in disrepair and a dispirited and disabled Lars Hanson declining after a stroke. It is up to the townspeople to rebuild Walnut Grove and rekindle the spirit of both the town and Mr. Hanson. People clean and repair their homes as well as town buildings. The school, church, mill, and mercantile all reopen. Alice Garvey continues as teacher. Lars Hanson summons his final strength and appears before the townspeople to thank them for revitalizing the town he founded. Everyone enters the church singing. Laura explains that Mr. Hanson died peacefully a few months later, happy in the knowledge that the town he loved would live on. Guest cast: Ray Bolger as Toby Noe
95	7	"Fagin"	Michael Landon	Carole Raschella & Michael Raschella	October 23, 1978	5010
Charles buys Albert a calf for the upcoming county fair, which Albert names Fagin. Laura grows jealous when Charles starts giving more attention to Albert. When Nellie teases Laura about having Albert as a brother, Laura socks Nellie in the eye. After Albert overhears Charles and Caroline talking about Laura's jealousy, Albert runs away, leaving Laura to take care of Fagin for the fair. When Fagin wins, Laura gets the ribbon, but then says that she wants to give it to "my brother Albert," which brings him to tears. Albert is unofficially adopted in this episode.
96	8	"Harriet's Happenings"	William F. Claxton	John T. Dugan	October 30, 1978	5009
Mrs. Oleson's distant cousin, Sterling Murdoch, comes to Walnut Grove to start the town's first newspaper, "The Pen and the Plow." Mrs. Oleson finagles a job writing a column for the fledgling newspaper, and soon pens scandalous stories about the residents of Hero Township. When she learns that a German student, Erich Schiller, beat Nellie in the school spelling bee, Mrs. Oleson claims that the lad's German immigrant parents are illiterate. Charles confronts Murdoch about his newspaper, but his complaints fall on deaf ears. Laura and Albert temporarily get back at Mrs. Oleson, but she responds by writing a story suggesting Charles fathered Albert outside his marriage. Charles has had enough and exposes the work of Murdoch and Mrs. Oleson in church on Sunday, clearing up the lie about the Schiller family (they could read German), then chastises the rest of the town for reading the newspaper. Guest cast: Ike Eisenmann as Erich Schiller, John Hillerman as Sterling Murdock, and King Moody as Otto Schiller
97	9	"The Wedding"	Michael Landon	Arthur Heinemann	November 6, 1978	5013
Adam proposes to Mary, and she accepts. Charles and Caroline travel to Winoka for the wedding (without the children, because it would be too much to pay for the train tickets). Mary starts to have doubts after hearing how hard it was for Charles and Caroline to take care of her when she was younger and considering how difficult it would be for her and Adam to care for a baby as blind parents. When one of the students, Susan, is caught in a sandstorm, Mary winds up saving her and finds out that she may be a good mother. In the end, the wedding goes on, with Susan as flower girl.
98	10	"Men Will Be Boys"	William F. Claxton	Arthur Heinemann	November 13, 1978	5005
When Albert and Andy boast they can become self-sufficient, Charles and Jonathan decide to take them on a camping trip to put that claim to rest. But Albert and Andy prove their worth, hiking for miles through woods to find a comfortable bed and meal in Sleepy Eye during a downpour. Their fathers, who are secretly following them, wind up having to shovel manure in order to sleep in a barn, and then fall off a log bridge.
99	11	"The Cheaters"	William F. Claxton	Don Balluck	November 20, 1978	5014
The Walnut Grove school children take a series of tests to prepare for the next grade, but after Andy Garvey shows barely passing grades, his mother, who is the teacher Mrs. Garvey, enlists Nellie to help him improve. Instead of helping him, Nellie shows him how to succeed by cheating, which she has also been doing. Andy cheats to improve his grades, which Laura witnesses. Later, at Andy's house, she sees him stealing his mom's test. Laura tells her dad, who later convinces Andy to own up to it. Andy confesses in front of the class. Laura speaks up to Mrs. Garvey about what Nellie had done to Andy. The next day for the final exams, Mrs. Garvey forces Nellie to remove her jacket she uses to hide cheat sheets. Nellie passes but not with excellent grades as before. Mrs Olesen was awarding a blue ribbon to the best student expecting it to be Nellie, but Albert wins it instead. Mrs. Garvey reveals why Nellie's final exam was so much lower than her other work. When Mrs. Olesen finds out Nellie was cheating, she chases Nellie out of the schoolhouse as the other kids and Mrs. Garvey get the last laugh.
100	12	"Blind Journey"	William F. Claxton	Story by : Carole & Michael Raschella & John T. Dugan; Teleplay by : John T. Dugan	November 27, 1978	5011
101	13	"Blind Journey"	William F. Claxton	Story by : Carole & Michael Raschella; Teleplay by : John T. Dugan	December 4, 1978	5012
Part 1: The church council in Walnut Grove finally vote to accept black man Joe Kagan as a member, against Mrs. Oleson's and Mr. Larabee's wishes. Mrs. Oleson's husband votes to let Kagan in the church against his wife's wishes. Meanwhile, the late Mr. Hanson had willed his large house to the church in Walnut Grove. Meanwhile, back in Winoka, the school for the blind's building was sold from under them to Mr. Standish who planned to move the destroyed saloon and hotel there. The blind school either has to find a new location or has to close. The congregation members in Walnut Grove agree to the Reverend's suggestion that the house become a new school for the blind. The school was to merge with another blind school in Kansas which would not bring their small staff but would still retain their matron, a woman by the name of Mrs. Terhune. The Winoka Blind School would retain Mary and Adam while its administrator would retire. When Mrs. Oleson makes a large cash donation, they also agree to name the new school after her. Charles and Joe travel to Winoka to help with the move, and they are astonished when Mrs. Oleson arrives at Winoka to accompany them and thereby meet and impress Mrs. Terhune, who she thinks is a wealthy socialite from St. Louis and France. Part 2: Mrs. Oleson is disappointed when she discovers that Mrs. Terhune is not an elite society lady from St. Louis, as she had thought, but rather Hester-Sue Terhune, the African-American caretaker of the blind school that has merged with the one run by the Kendalls. During the journey back to Walnut Grove, after scenes where Mrs. Oleson gets dirty, falls in the lake, and damages her good clothes, she begins to question her racist behavior and appears to "reform". Adam, meanwhile, must overcome his fear of water. He tearfully reveals to Mary that he lost his sight when he slipped and fell in a creek and smashed his head on a rock, causing a concussion that impaired his eyesight, and Mary tells him it is alright for him to be afraid after what happened and helps him power through his fear. When they arrive in Walnut Grove, Nels is pleasantly surprised to see the change in his wife...for now. Guest cast: Ketty Lester as Hester-Sue Terhune
102	14	"The Godsister"	Michael Landon	Don Balluck	December 18, 1978	5006
Carrie becomes heartsick for her Pa when Charles and Jonathan take jobs on a telephone crew and must be away for weeks. When nobody has time for her, Carrie creates an imaginary friend named Alyssa, and the two have wonderful adventures together.
103	15	"The Craftsman"	Michael Landon	Paul Wolff	January 8, 1979	5018
Albert takes a job as apprentice for Isaac Singerman, a Jew who is the target of deep prejudice in the community, particularly Harriet Oleson and Judd Larrabee and his sons. When Doc Baker tells Singerman he's terminally ill, Albert unknowingly (until the end is near) helps the craftsman construct the man's coffin. Guest cast: John Bleifer as Isaac Singerman, Alvin Kupperman as Aaron Singerman, Frank de Kova as Brower, Don 'Red' Barry as Jud Larrabee and Tony Becker as Zeke
104	16	"Blind Man's Bluff"	William F. Claxton	Arthur Heinemann	January 15, 1979	5016
Jordan Harrison, has dreams of one day working in a circus, but is troubled by his quarreling parents Timothy and Belle, who announce that they are planning to divorce. After an accident causes temporary blindness and brings his parents close again in their concern for him, Jordan says nothing when his sight returns. Laura finds out and struggles with whether she should tell everyone. Then Jordan has another fall and the outcome leaves Laura wondering. Guest cast: Ronnie Scribner as Jordan Harrison, Bert Kramer as Timothy Harrison, and Kathryn Leigh Scott as Belle Harrison
105	17	"Dance with Me"	Michael Landon	Paul Wolff	January 22, 1979	5015
The happy-go-lucky-who-turned-bankrupt Toby Noe returns. He is staying with the Ingalls family, eating them out of house and home, when the spirited spinster Amanda Cooper catches his eye. Toby sets out to win her heart, but she is determined to keep him at arm's length. Meanwhile, Laura has a crush on schoolmate Jason and, with Albert's counsel, tries to get him to notice her. Guest cast: Ray Bolger as Toby Noe, and Eileen Heckart as Amanda Cooper
106	18	"The Sound of Children"	William F. Claxton	Carole & Michael Raschella	February 5, 1979	5019
Mary and Adam discover they are having a baby. Adam's father Giles Kendall visits Walnut Grove upon learning the news, and convinces Adam and Mary to move to New York City so that Adam can attend law school and eventually become a partner in his father's law firm. After Mary suffers a miscarriage, Adam decides to stay in Walnut Grove with Mary. When Mary hears this, she says that it is what she wanted all along. Guest cast: Philip Abbott as Giles Kendall
107	19	"The Lake Kezia Monster"	Michael Landon	John T. Dugan	February 12, 1979	5020
Mrs. Oleson attempts to evict Kezia from her house by the lake. She, Willie, and Nellie move in and force Kezia to serve as their maid, but Laura, Albert, and Andy Garvey hatch a plan to drive the Olesons away: they get Kezia to concoct a story about a monster that inhabits the lake and then dress up as the monster. The plan works, the Olesons run away screaming, and Kezia keeps her house.
108	20	"Barn Burner"	Michael Landon	Don Balluck	February 19, 1979	5021
Judd Larabee agrees to join other farmers to insist on fair wheat prices from the mill-owners, but breaks his promise, making a separate deal at a lower price, partly because of his racist antagonism against black farmer Joe Kagan. Outraged, Jonathan Garvey confronts Larabee in front of his family. Larabee vengefully takes a shotgun to Jonathan's house, but only Andy is home; Larabee accidentally injures him. Andy, looking for his mom and dad, leaves a lamp by the barn which catches on fire. When the Garveys return home, they find their barn in flames, and Larabee is fingered as the likely culprit. At his trial, there are several surprising developments, including Andy's confession about leaving the lamp by the barn on a windy night, which prompts Judge Parker to throw out the barn burning charge. He still finds Larabee guilty of assault and instead of any additional jail time, he orders Larabee to recompense Jonathan for the value of his lost wheat crop. Larabee's wife, as a result of his hatred of many people, takes their sons and leaves him. Guest cast: Don "Red" Barry as Judd Larabee, and Jeff Corey as Judge Parker
109	21	"The Enchanted Cottage"	William F. Claxton	Don Balluck	February 26, 1979	5022
Mary suddenly thinks she is able to see light, and everybody has hopes that she might soon recover her sight. She and Charles travel to visit the eye doctor for tests, while Adam struggles with the possibility of Mary regaining her vision and what that might mean for their future. An excited Laura recruits Albert to help her fix up Mr. Edward's old shack for Mary and Adam to live in. However, the eye doctor discovers that Mary is only experiencing a rare condition in which her senses perceive the heat in sunlight as light (now known as synesthesia). Charles helps Mary come to terms with the shattering of her hopes, and when they are back in Walnut Grove Mary bravely does the same for a despondent Laura. Guest cast: Nathan Adler as Dr. Fromm
110	22	"Someone Please Love Me"	William F. Claxton	Michael Landon	March 5, 1979	5017
During a horse-buying trip to Sleepy Eye, Charles meets up with Brett Harper, one of the state's best horse breeders. Harper's alcoholism has taken a deep toll on the family, which is coming apart because of the lack of a strong head of the household. Charles temporarily takes the role as the family man while he tries to sober Harper up, but his touch may have worked too well: Harper's wife and children like Charles better than drunken Brett (who had become that way after his son had died). Charles manages to convince his family that Brett is a good person, but needs to be sober to be so. Guest cast: Charles Cioffi as Brett Harper, Jenny Sullivan as Leslie Harper, Kyle Richards as Samantha Harper, Bobby Rolofson as Thomas Harper, Edwin Owens as Sandy, Bill McLean as Clerk, and Eddie Quillan as Gargan
111	23	"Mortal Mission"	William F. Claxton	John T. Dugan	March 12, 1979	5023
When many Walnut Grove townsfolk, including Laura, Albert and Adam, become seriously ill after eating anthrax-infected mutton, the Blind School is turned into a makeshift hospital and morgue. Charles and Jonathan, among the few who have not fallen sick, rush to get Dr. Baker's urgently needed medical supplies from the railhead at Springfield, but after collecting them they are held up at gunpoint and robbed. As their families and friends in Walnut Grove become increasingly anxious, they set out to track down the thief and recover the vital medicines. Guest cast: Jerry Hardin as Hank Slade, Charles Parks as Virgil Fenton, Carolyn Conwell as Bess Slade, and Peter Kilman as Garth Fenton
112	24	"The Odyssey"	Michael Landon	Carole & Michael Raschella	March 19, 1979	5024
Laura and Albert's friend from school Dylan Whittaker has a dream: to one day see the ocean, which he loves to paint pictures of. When Dylan discovers he has a terminal illness (revealed to be leukemia), he sets out in pursuit of his dream, and Laura and Albert join him. The trio begin the journey west by jumping a ride on a train, but their problems are only just beginning. Charles manages to catch up with them, but the children persuade him to help Dylan realize his dream of seeing the ocean before he dies. In San Francisco, William Randolph Hearst, the famous American newspaper magnate, helps them get to the coast, and to get home. Guest cast: Steve Shaw as Dylan Whittaker, Melinda Cordell as Gwen Whittaker, Ken O'Brien as Ferret, J.S. 'Joe' Young as Zacc McCabe, James Driskill as Snake, Bill Ewing as William Hearst, John Steadman as Jasper, Bill Quinn as Conductor, Gavin Mooney as Stationmaster, and Maurice Hill as Editor

=== Season 6 (1979–1980) ===
No. overall	No. in season	Title	Directed by	Written by	Original release date	Prod. code
113	1	"Back to School"	Michael Landon	Michael Landon	September 17, 1979	6001
114	2	"Back to School"	Michael Landon	Michael Landon	September 24, 1979	6002
Part 1: A new school year in Walnut Grove begins with a new teacher, Miss Eliza Jane Wilder as Alice Garvey stepped down from being the teacher at the end of the school year. With Nellie graduating, Laura (now 15) also meets Eliza's brother Almanzo Wilder (in his mid-20s), who has a remarkable effect upon her, and she is overjoyed when Almanzo tells her they should have nicknames just for each other: "Manly" and "Beth". Nellie and her mother also have eyes on the handsome young farmer and hope that Nellie's new restaurant and hotel will attract his attention. Charles is badly injured in an accident at the mill and has to take time off work while he recovers, so Caroline takes the post of cook at Nellie's restaurant, where Nellie has refused to do the cooking. Later, Almanzo reluctantly has dinner with Nellie, who serves his favorite dish, cinnamon chicken. However, stand-in cook Laura maliciously loads the chicken with cayenne pepper instead. Part 2: Caroline makes Laura apologize to Nellie and Almanzo. Deciding she wants to speed up becoming an adult, Laura tells her Pa to stop calling her 'Half-Pint', and asks to take her graduation exam early. Nellie gives Laura some bad advice and she fails the exam miserably. When Laura and Nellie end up fighting in a muddy pond, Almanzo takes Laura back to his place to clean up but he leaves Nellie in the mud, much to her annoyance. Nellie tells everyone in the kitchen at the restaurant that she caught Almanzo kissing Laura, and Charles hurries to Almanzo's house to "beat Almanzo Wilder within an inch of his life". This leads to Charles punching Almanzo and Laura running off, before Charles finds out what really happened. After Laura talks with Caroline, who understands that she is in love with Almanzo, Laura makes up with her Pa and tells him he can still call her "Half-Pint".
115	3	"The Family Tree"	William F. Claxton	Vince Gutierrez	October 1, 1979	6006
The school's latest project is to create a "family tree" documenting the history of the pupils' families, which causes Albert to remember his own dark past. He has become so attached to the Ingalls family that he asks Charles to adopt him. But first, they must face Albert's birth father, Jeremy Quinn, who wants a son who can help him on his farm. When they attend the court offices, Albert meets Mr. Quinn alone and feigns blindness in front of him. This causes Quinn to tell him he can stay with the Ingalls, which confirms to Albert that his father does not love him as Charles does. Albert is officially adopted in this episode. Guest cast: Michael Pataki as Jeremy Quinn, John Zaremba as Judge Adams, Richard Lockmiller as Jacob, and Tiger Williams as Simon
116	4	"The Third Miracle"	Michael Landon	Kenneth Hunter	October 8, 1979	6005
Laura and Albert work hard to harvest honey after Mr. Oleson agrees to buy it at 30 cents a pound. Adam wins a teaching award and must travel to Saint Paul to receive it, but they lack money for the trip. Laura and Albert offer their earnings from the honey to cover most of the cost. Mr. Oleson is out of town, and Mrs. Oleson attempts to swindle the children by only offering them 15 cents a pound. Albert cleverly offers Mrs. Oleson their main beehive for the full amount promised, and she accepts. En route to Saint Paul, Mary, Adam and another woman are involved in stagecoach accident and Mary is the only one who is able to seek help. While she is climbs a hillside, her old glasses fall from her pocket and the lenses magnify the sunlight, starting a fire, which acts as a signal for Charles and Jonathan, who are searching for them. Meanwhile, Laura and Albert get Mrs. Oleson and Nellie to come pick up the hive, not telling them they're doing it during the time the bees are the most active, causing them to get attacked on the way home. Guest cast: Leslie Landon as Marge Loren, James Jeter as Hans Dorfler, Ruth Foster as Melinda Foster, Troy Melton as Stage Driver, and Alex Sharp as Rider #1
117	5	"Annabelle"	William F. Claxton	Del Reisman	October 15, 1979	6003
When the circus comes to town, Nels discovers that his estranged obese sister, Annabelle, whom he was always ashamed of when they were kids, is the Fat Lady, and seeks to avoid anyone knowing this. When Annabelle visits the Blind School, Nels' shame is still apparent. Meanwhile, Laura becomes depressed when she goes to ask Almanzo to the circus, only to find out that he is already taking a rude, snobby and snooty young woman named Christie, for whom she has been mending a dress. When she delivers the dress five minutes late, Christie refuses to pay her the full amount. Laura has a heart to heart with the sad clown about Almanzo and discovers the clown is the circus manager! He keeps her secret and allows her to be an unrecognizable clown at the circus. Laura seeks revenge on Christie when she becomes a guest clown for the circus, dumping water on her and, after she runs off, kissing Almanzo. Later at the circus, Nels announces [as the ring master] to all in attendance that Annabelle is his sister and how proud he is of her. Guest cast: Billy Barty as Owen, and Ken Berry as London, Harriet Gibson as Annabelle, Wendy Schaal as Christie Norton, De'voreaux White as Roscue
118	6	"The Preacher Takes A Wife"	Maury Dexter	Story by : John T. Dugan; Teleplay by : Blanche Hanalis	October 22, 1979	6007
Rev. Alden falls in love with a member of his congregation and marries her, but almost comes at a cost when Mrs. Oleson attempts to tear their relationship apart, distressing the Reverend to illness. Mrs. Oleson reports Rev. Alden to church leadership, but the tables turn when the minister representative Dean Russell Harmon turns out to be her former fiancé, who broke their engagement when unable to commit to serving "both God and marriage". Guest cast: William Schallert as Dean Russell Harmon and Iris Korn as Anna Craig
119	7	"The Halloween Dream"	Michael Landon	Michael Landon	October 29, 1979	6011
Before going to a Halloween party at Nellie's dressed up as Indians, Albert and Laura take a nap because they will be staying up late. Albert has a dream in which they are mistaken for real Indians and taken to the camp of a tribe which believes Albert is the son of an Indian chief. Guest cast: Philip Carey as Commander Kaiser, Frank DeKova as Chief Kilowatt, and George Aguilar as Brave x#1
120	8	"The Return of Mr. Edwards"	Michael Landon	Arthur Heinemann	November 5, 1979	6004
Mr. Edwards has become prosperous owning a logging business. After Alicia brings him lunch, she is endangered by a falling tree, and although Edwards saves her, he is hit by the tree, badly injuring one of his legs. Having to use a crutch and fearing he is crippled for life and will be a burden to his family, he falls into severe depression. Grace writes to the Ingalls asking for their help. Charles and Laura travel to visit, and after Laura seems to revive Edwards' old spirit, he suggests a hunting trip for the three. However, it soon transpires that Edwards has other plans, and twice Charles has to stop Edwards from trying to commit suicide. In desperation, Charles pretends to have been injured in a gun accident, and Edwards has to walk out for help, shocking him back to his old, irascible self. Guest cast: Bonnie Bartlett as Grace Snider Edwards, Kyle Richards as Alicia Sanderson Edwards, Victor French as Isaiah Edwards, Eddie Quillan as Shorty, Rod McGaughy as Rod McGaughy Townsman, and Vince Tortell as Thomas
121	9	"The King Is Dead"	Michael Landon	Michael Landon	November 12, 1979	6010
Milo Stavropoulis is a former Greek champion wrestler forced to become a jobber in order to pay for his ailing wife Anna's continued medical treatment. His boss, an unscrupulous professional wrestling promoter persuades Jonathan to compete for a large money prize in his shady wrestling competition in Mankato, duping him into facing the current champion Hans. After Jonathan wins a rigged preliminary bout, many of the residents of Walnut Grove bet on Jonathan to win the final, including Mrs. Oleson who risks the money entrusted to her as treasurer for the church. Milo receives word that Anna has chosen to discontinue her treatments for the sake of her husband's pride, because hanging on to life is causing him pain; she has died, leaving him with the words, "Life is a temporary condition- love is forever.". Milo, no longer constrained to throw fights, decides to show Jonathan what he's really getting into and takes his place in the championship bout to prevent his boss from raking in easy money, ironically causing Harriet to more than double the church fund, much to Nels's dumbfounding. However, this final match strains elderly Milo's heart, and he dies after the match concludes with his victory and his pride restored. Guest cast: Leo Gordon as Milo Stavroupolis, Ray Walston as Jimmy Hart, Nora Meerbaum as Anna Stavroupolis, Jack Yates as Hans Mueller, Jennifer Rhodes as Nurse, and Charles Julian as Bookie
—	S	"The Little House Years"	Michael Landon	Michael Landon	November 15, 1979	6680
In this three-hour special retrospective, the Ingalls and Kendall families spend Thanksgiving together, as Laura pages through her remembrance book. They reminisce about their past years in Walnut Grove. Scenes include clips from previous episodes: Moving, buying the land, building the "Little House," and losing their first crop to rain in "A Harvest of Friends" – Charles leaving on a "100 Mile Walk" to work in a quarry – Laura and Jonah finding gold "At The End of the Rainbow" – Caroline giving birth to their only son, Charles Fredrick Ingalls, Laura's subsequent jealousy, and the baby's death and aftermath in "The Lord is My Shepherd" – Laura and Nellie quarreling over "Bunny" and "The Race" they have afterwards – Charles's father visits the Little House after a "Journey in the Spring" and the death of Charles's mother. Note: Runtime without commercials is approximately 2 hours and 12 minutes. The special was also shown in three, one hour-long (~42 min.) segments on Hallmark Drama.
122	10	"The Faith Healer"	Maury Dexter	Don Balluck	November 19, 1979	6009
A traveling minister, Jacob Danforth, comes to Walnut Grove on a 'healing' crusade and attracts a large attendance at his meetings where some people make miraculous recoveries. Despite the death of a young local boy whom he had treated, Danforth is asked to replace Reverend Alden who prepares to leave. Then, on a business trip to Sleepy Eye, Charles discovers the truth about Danforth's methods: he performs a schlemiel from town to town with the same three performers in the audience pretending to be disabled, and Reverend Alden is persuaded to stay on. Guest cast: James Olson as Reverend Jacob Danforth and Tom Rosqui as Matthew Dobbs
123	11	"Author! Author!"	William F. Claxton	Carole and Michael Raschella	November 26, 1979	6013
Caroline hears that her mother and stepfather are coming for a visit, but her mother passes away during the train journey. Caroline's stepfather, Frederick Holbrook, is inconsolably distraught, until the family—enjoying his tales of when Caroline was young—persuade him to write his autobiography. Then Charles has the idea of trying to get it published. Meanwhile, Mary is heavily pregnant, and soon gives birth to Charles's and Caroline's first grandson, Adam Charles Holbrook Kendall. Guest cast: Barry Sullivan as Frederick Holbrook, Dan Priest as Station Master, and Babs Bram as Dowager
124	12	"Crossed Connections"	Michael Landon	Don Balluck	December 10, 1979	6008
The telephone comes to Walnut Grove when Harriet Oleson buys the local franchise, and, as the switchboard operator, Harriet listens in on all the phone conversations. Jonathan Garvey has recently inherited some money and has a phone installed as a surprise for his wife. However, Harriet overhears a secret from Alice Garvey's past regarding a hidden divorce and broadcasts it, which causes problems for the Garveys and sends Jonathan on a quest to Minneapolis to find Alice's ex-husband, a failed gambler who was in prison for a failed bank robbery. Albert and Laura get the help of the bank manager, Mr. Anderson, in teaching Harriet an expensive lesson, which includes Harriet giving her share of Oleson's Mercantile to Nels, making him the sole owner. Guest cast: Royal Dano as Harold, Sam Edwards as Mr. Bill Anderson, Marie Denn as Alice's Mother, and Dave Morick as First Technician
125	13	"The Angry Heart"	William F. Claxton	Del Reisman	December 17, 1979	6012
A long time ago, drunken Joe Dortmunder abuses his wife and son, before finally storming out of his house and getting into a fight with the local dock foreman, who shoots and kills him in self-defense. Now a teenage boy, his bitter and hateful son Tod, comes to Walnut Grove from Chicago to live with his grandparents when his mother can no longer tolerate his ill-tempered behavior. After he steals Charles's pocket watch and strikes his grandfather, Charles offers to help reform Tod by having him work on his farm. When Tod has repaid his debt and prepares to leave for San Francisco, Charles gives him a gift for his hard work: a blue shirt; but it triggers his horrible memories of abuse from his father and he angrily rips it up. Charles helps Tod face and then let go of his past, and he comes to realize the importance of needing someone in his life as he makes peace with his grandparents.
126	14	"The Werewolf of Walnut Grove"	William F. Claxton	John T. Dugan	January 7, 1980	6014
A new pupil, Bartholomew "Bart" Slater, bullies Miss Wilder, the schoolteacher, and the other children, especially Albert. Albert and Bart get into a fight and Almanzo steps in after coming out of Oleson's and seeing what is happening. When the school board fails to back her, Miss Wilder fears she will have to leave, and Almanzo tells Laura he will be leaving with his sister. So Laura helps the resourceful Albert in an attempt to bring down the bully by creating a papier-mâché werewolf costume, and it nearly succeeds until Carrie unwittingly exposes their prank. Now desperate to prevent Almanzo leaving, Laura rallies all the children to act together to gang up on Bart and fight back when he next picks on one of them. Bruised, Bart apologizes to Miss Wilder and promises to change his ways. Laura is happy that Almanzo will also be staying.
127	15	"What Ever Happened to The Class of '56?"	Michael Landon	John T. Dugan	January 14, 1980	6015
Charles is elected to represent the farmers of Hero Township at a Grange convention in Milwaukee to consider a proposal that farming machinery should be bought directly from manufacturers, saving money for the farmers. At the same time, Caroline gets an invitation to the 25th anniversary reunion party of her school class of 1856 in the same city, so Charles and Caroline travel there together. They find that some of their old classmates have become financially prosperous, and are on the other side of the proposal by the Grange. However, they are saddened by the state of some of the marriages of their old friends. When they return home, they agree that they are the ones who are really successful and prosperous – with the love of their family. Guest cast: Liam Sullivan as Dillon Hyde, Lynn Benisch as Amy Phillips Sawyer, James Gallery as Arnie Cupps, Phillip Pine as Winthrop Morgan, Mary Elizabeth Corrigan as Clementina Hyde, Lynn Cartwright as Florence Garner Platz, John Lawrence as Jacob Platz, Jean Howell as Hattie Simpson Cupps, and Damian London as Waiter
128	16	"Darkness Is My Friend"	Michael Landon	Vince R. Gutierrez	January 21, 1980	6016
Adam travels with Hester-Sue, Caroline and Harriet to Redwood Falls to apply for state funding for the blind school. As they will be away overnight, Laura goes to stay with Mary. During the night, Laura and Mary are taken hostage by a trio of escaped convicts, one of whom has a gunshot wound sustained during their escape. When Laura is sent to get a doctor, she goes home and tells her Pa what has happened. Charles goes to the school and poses as Doc Baker, and he manages to overcome the villains. When Adam returns, saying they were refused the funding, Charles finds a good use for the reward money he has received for the recapture of the convicts.
129	17	"Silent Promises"	Maury Dexter	Carole and Michael Raschella	January 28, 1980	6017
Laura offers to teach sign language to a deaf boy, Daniel, and his widowed father. Daniel makes good progress, and then he suddenly tells Laura he loves her and tries to kiss her. She does not feel the same but, when she sees Almanzo with yet another lady-friend, she considers seeking consolation with Daniel. A talk with her Pa helps her to decide that honesty will be best for both her and Daniel. Meanwhile, Albert builds a doghouse for Bandit, who seems not to understand its purpose. Guest cast: Lou Fant as Nathan Page, Alban Branton as Daniel Page, and Gaye Nelson as Sara
130	18	"May We Make Them Proud"	Michael Landon	Michael Landon	February 4, 1980 (Note: May We Make Them Proud originally aired as a single episode with a 120 minute runtime. It may air as two parts in syndication or on DVD sets.)	6018
130	18	"May We Make Them Proud"	Michael Landon	Michael Landon	February 4, 1980	6019
Part 1: The 1st Annual Charity Picnic is held at The Harriet Oleson Institute for the Advancement of Blind Children to raise funds to extend the building. Albert and a friend named Clay experiment with smoking a pipe in the basement and accidentally start a fire, which destroys the building and claims the lives of Alice Garvey and Adam Jr. Afterwards, Mary is in deep shock and denial that her baby has gone, so Adam goes to New York City to find specialist help for her and to look for a new teaching post. Albert struggles with feelings of guilt, while Jonathan Garvey starts to drink alcohol, blaming God for his wife's death. Part 2: A gift from Albert to Mary awakens her memory of the fire and the loss of her baby, and her screams frighten Albert into running away. Albert eventually seeks out his estranged father Jeremy, only to stumble upon a freshly-dug grave at his homestead and realize Jeremy has just died, and he has nowhere else to go now. Charles and Jonathan set out to discover the truth about the fire and to track down Albert, and it is Jonathan who convinces Albert that it wasn't his fault that the two had died. Adam returns from New York City to announce that his father has offered to finance the rebuilding of the school, and has insisted that it be named "The Alice Garvey and Adam Kendall Jr. School for The Blind". As they unveil the plaque, Adam says "May we make them proud."
131	19	"Wilder and Wilder"	Maury Dexter	John T. Dugan	February 11, 1980	6020
As the second half of the original series begins, Almanzo's wandering younger brother, Perley Day, comes to stay, and Charles hopes Laura's feelings will shift to him, until it emerges that he is a troublemaker who doesn't care about injuring a horse, only winning bets. But Laura's dreams are still firmly focused on Almanzo, whom Charles begins to see in a new light, after Almanzo forfeits an arm wrestling match in order to save his horse from Perley Day. Meanwhile, Albert falls for a new girl in town, but she only has eyes for Andy.
132	20	"Second Spring"	William F. Claxton	John T. Dugan	February 18, 1980	6021
Charles is in trouble with Caroline after forgetting their wedding anniversary. Nels decides he has had enough of his henpecked family life and begins selling Mercantile wares on the road. Along the way, he takes lodgings in Tracy and meets a beautiful Irish woman named Molly. The two begin a wonderful friendship, and they learn they have real feelings for each other. Nels finds himself fighting temptation and infidelity, complicated by Charles accidentally catching him kissing a woman who is not his wife. Eventually, Nels tells Molly he is married and that they cannot see each other anymore. Nels goes home where he and Harriet make up. Guest cast: Suzanne Rogers as Molly Reardon and Tom Clancy as Dan Reardon
133	21	"Sweet Sixteen"	Michael Landon	John T. Dugan	February 25, 1980	6022
The school district's superintendent comes to Walnut Grove, looking for someone who can replace a teacher who has fallen and broken her leg. Eliza Jane recommends Laura, despite her being two weeks short of the minimum age of 16, and she passes her teacher's exam and is given her teacher's certificate and the position. Almanzo drives her to the town where she will teach and stay with the injured teacher. When Almanzo sees her after her first week, he begins to think he may have romantic feelings for Laura, which confuses him. So he invites Laura to a church social and is taken aback when she says she'll think about it. Later he comes in while one of her students is showing her how flexible the rib cage is, and thinks that the student is kissing Laura. Almanzo punches the student out of jealousy then thinks he has no chance of Laura falling in love with him. Charles explains to Laura that Almanzo acted out of jealousy, which means that he is now returning her feelings for him. So Laura seeks him out at the church social, and they share their first kiss on her 16th birthday. Guest cast: Lucille Benson as Miss Trimble, Parley Baer as Mr. Williams, Tim Maier as Chad Brewster, and Jonathan B. Woodward as Tommy Dobkins
134	22	"He Loves Me, He Loves Me Not"	Michael Landon	Michael Landon	May 5, 1980	6023
135	23	"He Loves Me, He Loves Me Not"	Michael Landon	Michael Landon	May 12, 1980	6024
Part 1: Almanzo proposes to Laura, who accepts, but Charles insists that they should not marry until Laura is eighteen. Almanzo refuses to accept this, and tells Laura he plans to leave Walnut Grove and asks her to defy her father and go with him, but she refuses. The Olesons hire Percival Dalton to improve the operation of Nellie's failing restaurant and hotel but, even when it is temporarily renamed "Caroline's Restaurant and Hotel", Nellie stubbornly refuses to learn. Only when Percival tells her she is pretty does she soften and start to cooperate. As construction of the new school for the blind is progressing, Adam gets the news that his father has died, and when he and Laura go to New York City they learn that his father's entire estate has been wiped out by his heavy debts and cannot now finance the new school building. However, as they return through Sleepy Eye, Laura spots an old courthouse building available for rent. Having learned that Almanzo is working in Sleepy Eye, Caroline suggests Laura go there to help set up the new blind school, but she runs into opposition from the grouchy caretaker who holes himself up in the building and the irascible rent collector. Part 2: Laura goes to Sleepy Eye to help Mary and Adam get the new blind school ready. Almanzo visits her, but their talk turns into another argument. However, Almanzo takes a second job so that he can secretly pay the shortfall of rent for the blind school, persuading Houston the caretaker to tell Laura that the landlord has reduced the rent. Then Laura sees Almanzo in town with a saloon girl and thinks he has found a new girlfriend. Later, through working two jobs, Almanzo becomes gravely ill with pneumonia. Charles finds out the whole story and tells Laura. She goes to care for Almanzo and, with the matter of the 'other woman' cleared up, they make up. After Almanzo's recovery, Charles tells him and Laura they must wait one year [rather than two] before they marry. Meanwhile, under Percival's tutelage, Nellie learns to cook and be pleasant to her customers, and when he is about to leave she tells Percival she loves him. After her earlier insults, it is what Percival has been waiting for, and they marry the next day. Guest cast: Dub Taylor as Houston Lamb, Michael Prince as Mr. Carter, Dan McBride customer #1, Dee Croxton as secretary, Dean D'Annibale as butcher Boy, Alvy Moore as Mr. Crowley, Robert Wexler as Mr. Pims, Nancy Lee Grahn as saloon girl, Michelle Downey as Susan 'Sue' Goodspeed, Robert Ulrich as customer #2, and Rafael Moscatel as little boy

=== Season 7 (1980–1981) ===
No. overall	No. in season	Title	Directed by	Written by	Original release date	Prod. code
136	1	"Laura Ingalls Wilder"	Michael Landon	Michael Landon	September 22, 1980	7052
137	2	"Laura Ingalls Wilder"	Michael Landon	Michael Landon	September 29, 1980	7053
Part 1: Six months before their planned wedding, Almanzo buys land for free from a Mr. Gray for a farm for him and Laura, but he agrees to a harsh deal that he must pay off the mortgage by a deadline or lose the title. When there is a drought, Gray, who owns the neighbouring farm, dams the stream which also waters Almanzo's land, thereby threatening Almanzo's crop and his ability to meet the deal. Eliza Jane falls in love with Harve Miller, a friend of Almanzo's who has come to live in Walnut Grove. Laura begins teaching at the Walnut Grove school, but Almanzo strongly objects to the idea of her teaching after they are married, insisting that he will provide for them and will not want her to go out to work. Nellie finds out that she is pregnant, which comes as a shock to her mother. Part 2: As the drought continues, Almanzo loses his crop and the land. Laura suggests she take the teaching position in Radnor to help them earn money for a new farm, but Almanzo still objects and postpones the wedding. After another argument, Laura breaks their engagement. The relationship of Eliza Jane and Harve seems to blossom, but when she tells him she loves him, he reveals he is in love with someone else. The loss of her dream incites Eliza Jane to strike out for a new life elsewhere and to bring Laura and Almanzo back together by allowing Laura to take the teaching job in Walnut Grove, along with the house which goes with it. Almanzo agrees, and he and Laura are married at the Blind School in Sleepy Eye, which happens to be the same day as Adam and Mary's anniversary. Guest cast: James Cromwell as Harve Miller and Chris Shaffer as Matt Gray, Alvy Moore as storekeeper, Edmund Stoiber as Reverend Hartwig, Judy Sardo as Mary Allenby, Kyle Williams as John Allenby, and Jack Lilley as stage driver
138	3	"A New Beginning"	William F. Claxton	John T. Dugan	October 6, 1980	7054
Trying to start a new life after Alice's death, Jonathan moves to Sleepy Eye and buys a freight business. Jonathan helps Andy resolve his feeling that Mary and Adam are to blame for his mother's death. The fledgling business quickly becomes the target of robbers, and Jonathan becomes a deputy to support the sheriff in dealing with the villains. With help from Charles, Jonathan catches the ringleaders, but then Andy is beaten up by the gang, and the repercussions lead to a violent and tragic outcome. Guest cast: Harry Carey Jr. as Sheriff Pike, Med Flory as Pete Rawlins, John Dukakis as Tim Mahoney, Milton Selzer as Elija Pattman, John Larch as Arthur Mahoney, and Stuart Nisbet as Jenkins
139	4	"Fight Team Fight!"	Michael Landon	Don Balluck	October 13, 1980	7056
Former college football star Pete Ellerbee comes to Walnut Grove to coach the town's football team and to encourage his son in playing. Albert joins the team and is inspired by Ellerbee's stirring pep talks about teamwork, responsibility and doing your best. Ellerbee's real goal is just to win, which for him proves manhood and pride, but his demands upon the boys' time leads him to a confrontation with Laura as their teacher. Soon, Albert and the others find football is not so much fun, and when Ellerbee's single-mindedness endangers Albert's well-being, Charles has to step in. Albert then decides that his priority is his studies and that for him football should be for fun. Pete grudgingly resigns to making football practice less severe, after nearly destroying his marriage and family life. Guest cast: William Traylor as Pete Ellerbee, Terrence O'Connor as Sandra Ellerbee, James Jarnigan as Dan Ellerbee, Ron Doyle as referee, Joshua Davis as Clyde, and Margaret Richey as girl
140	5	"The Silent Cry"	Michael Landon	Michael Landon	October 20, 1980	7051
Houston, the cantankerous caretaker at the Blind School, tries to help two orphaned boys. The younger one, Josh, has not spoken since his arrival at the orphanage in Sleepy Eye, making him unappealing to a potential adoptive couple, but his older brother, Michael, refuses to be separated from him, so they run away, and Jonathan, as deputy, spends much time searching for them. Houston hides the boys, and they become attached to him and he wants to adopt them, but is told that would not be possible for him. However, his impassioned intervention on behalf of the boys produces a change in Josh which changes the minds of the couple previously wanting to adopt only Michael, and they agree to take Josh too. Guest cast: David Faustino as Josh, Ivan Bonar as Mr. Case, David Hollander as Michael, Dub Taylor as Houston Lamb, Elizabeth Hoffman as Miss Mason, George Dickerson as Mr. Rooney, Barbara Beckley as Mrs. Rooney, Al Dunlap as Doc Higgs, and Michelle Downey as Susan 'Sue' Goodspeed
141	6	"Portrait of Love"	William F. Claxton	Michael Landon	October 27, 1980	7055
A young, talented painter named Annie Crane is the talk of the town for her talent, despite having lost her sight in early childhood. An art exhibitor is impressed by Annie's work and arranges for her pictures to be publicized. Annie's birth mother realizes who she is and tries to arrange a meeting, but Annie refuses, embittered by memories of being abandoned by her as a child. Caroline intervenes to bring about a reconciliation. Meanwhile, with Nellie's permission, Percival confronts his mother-in-law over her interference in their lives by her over-protectiveness of Nellie. Annie's mother, married to her second husband, tells him not to reveal the fact that she is also blind, but the truth comes out when she is reunited with her child, who reveals that she suffered a bout of scarlet fever, and Annie's biological father died (possibly due to contracting the fever as well). The aftereffects caused her to go blind, and she was carrying Annie at the time of the sickness, who contracted them as well. Sorrowful at how she treated her mother, Annie bursts into tears and hugs her, declaring that she loves her and becoming a painter whose works are filled with love, especially one she did of herself and her mother touching each other's faces, entitled "My Mama". Guest cast: Madeleine Stowe as Annie Crane, Jim Antonio as Victor Crosby, and Ward Costello as Jeremy Unger
142	7	"Divorce Walnut Grove Style"	Michael Landon	Don Balluck	November 10, 1980	7057
Laura and Almanzo clash again over their different aspirations for their marriage, and this is aggravated when Laura comes to believe that Almanzo is having an affair with one of his former girlfriends, Brenda Sue. Laura returns to her family, saying she wants to leave Almanzo, and even picks a fight with Brenda Sue. Mrs. Oleson seems to enjoy spreading the bad news, but Charles and Caroline help to bring Laura and Almanzo back together. Meanwhile, Charles has his own problems with Laura as he tries to fit a new picture window in the house. Guest cast: Tisch Raye as Brenda Sue Longworth, Alvy Moore as Storekeeper, Eve Brent as Eve Brent as Olga Tuttle, Eric Taslitz as Timothy, Gillian Grant as Susan, and Patrick Armstrong as Steven
143	8	"Dearest Albert, I'll Miss You"	Michael Landon	Michael Landon	November 17, 1980	7059
As part of a school project, Albert becomes pen pals with a girl in Minneapolis named Leslie. Both of them fabricate stories about themselves to appear more attractive to the other: Albert postures as a tall athlete, while Leslie portrays herself as a ballerina and hides her paraplegia which confines her to a wheelchair. When Albert falls in love with her, he determines to see her by accompanying Charles when he travels to a Grange meeting in Minneapolis but, when his father refuses, Albert resorts to desperate measures. Guest cast: Diane Shalet as Mrs. Barton, Martin Rudy as Dr. Marx, Olan Soule as Mr. McGinnis, Dan Priest as conductor, Jamie Seibert as Timmy, Gillian Grant as Heather, Ruth Foster as Melinda Foster, Dan Caldwell as photographer, and Dorothy Butts as maid
144	9	"The In-laws"	William F. Claxton	Don Balluck	November 24, 1980	7058
At the suggestion of Jonathan Garvey, who has more business than he can cope with, Charles and Almanzo agree to start their own freight business from Walnut Grove to Sleepy Eye, and they decide to call it 'Ingalls and Wilder'. However, they disagree when Almanzo suggests that there might be a shortcut to get to Sleepy Eye more quickly than the usual route, so the two decide to have a race to see who is right. Almanzo makes a mistake in carrying too much uphill and is forced to unload, then finds his goods absconded by a desperately poor family, while Charles gets the hare-brained idea of leaving the beaten path and driving his horses into a creek and private property, picking up a hitchhiker named Kavendish who berates him for his foolishness. Guest cast: Eddie Quillan as Kavendish, Terrence Evans as Horace Choate, Patricia Herd as Emma Choate, Dan Priest as conductor, Donald Brenon as Cooley, and Chad Cowgill as Boy #1
145	10	"To See the Light"	Michael Landon	Michael Landon	December 1, 1980	7060
146	11	"To See the Light"	Michael Landon	Michael Landon	December 8, 1980	7061
Part 1: After being caught in an explosion at Jonathan Garvey's freight warehouse, Adam regains his sight after suffering a second concussion that undoes the blinding effect of the first, and revives his ambition to be a lawyer like his father. When he gets the opportunity to take the entrance test for law school, Adam studies with such commitment that he neglects his teaching duties, and is unaware of Mary's misgivings. This worries Mary, who starts to believe Adam will not want to stay with a blind wife now that he has rejoined the world of the sighted. Meanwhile, Nels and Percival are both concerned about their wives' eating habits. Part 2: Adam eventually travels to Minneapolis to take the entrance examinations for law school, but late one night he is assaulted and robbed by hoodlums. Although he recovers temporarily, he then falls seriously ill, causing him to miss the final examinations. Fortunately, his friend Alan Barton allows him to stay at his house and be attended by his doctor. When they hear, Mary and Charles travel to see Adam, and Mary, trying to make up for her previous lack of support for Adam's ambition, persuades the college professor to allow him to complete his examinations, and Adam wins a scholarship to study law. Guest cast: Donald Petrie as Alan Barton, Sid Conrad as doctor, and Donald Hotton as Professor Mayfield
147	12	"Oleson Versus Oleson"	William F. Claxton	Chris Abbott	January 5, 1981	7062
A female campaigner for the equal rights of married women comes to Walnut Grove, looking for signatures on a petition to be submitted to the state legislature. The men are all reluctant to sign, including Nels, who is in the middle of another big disagreement with Harriet. Charles and Almanzo also oppose it, even though they believe in equality and joint ownership in their own marriages. So Caroline moves out of the house and organizes other wives in a mass 'walk out' from their matrimonial duties. Eventually, the husbands, led by Charles, decide that they can support the petition, and marital peace and harmony is restored. Guest cast: Kay Howell as Elizabeth Smith, Ruth Foster as Melinda Foster, Rod McGaughy as Man #1, Robert Balderson as Man #2, and Jaye Durkus as Man #3
148	13	"Come, Let Us Reason Together"	Michael Landon	Carole & Michael Raschella	January 12, 1981	7063
When Percival's parents visit Walnut Grove for the birth of Nellie's baby, Percival reveals that his real name is Isaac Cohen, much to Harriet's consternation. Percival's father, Benjamin, is passionately and devoutly Jewish, which brings him into conflict with Harriet and her Christian beliefs, especially over the question of which religion the new baby will be raised in. Nels brokers a truce between Benjamin and Harriet with the suggestion that a boy should be raised in the Jewish faith and a girl should be raised as a Christian. When Nellie gives birth, she unexpectedly has twins, a girl and a boy, so Nellie and Percival agree to raise their son Benjamin as Jewish and their daughter Jennifer as a Christian. Guest cast: E.M. Margolese as Benjamin Cohen, Bea Silvern as Edna Cohen, Dan McBride as Mr. Reilly, and Jack Lilley as stage driver
149	14	"The Nephews"	William F. Claxton	Chris Abbott	January 19, 1981	7064
Almanzo's elder brother Royal and his wife Millie visit Walnut Grove, and they leave their two young sons in the care of Almanzo and Laura, while Royal and his wife go away on a vacation. Royal's wife believes a parent should never say 'No' to a child, and their boys' constant mischief tries the patience of Almanzo and Laura, who are determined to adopt a different parenting style with their own children. Guest cast: Woody Eney as Royal Wilder, Aileen Fitzpatrick as Millie Wilder, Ham Larsen as Myron Wilder, Rossie Harris as Rupert Wilder, Jack Lilley as stage driver, and Ruth Foster as Melinda Foster
150	15	"Make a Joyful Noise"	William F. Claxton	Kathleen McGhee-Anderson	January 26, 1981	7065
Joe Kagan gives up his farm and moves to Sleepy Eye to work with Jonathan Garvey in his freight business and hoping to persuade Hester-Sue to marry him. However, although she has feelings for Joe, he reminds her of her shiftless and unfaithful ex-husband, and she has plans to marry a successful local businessman. Joe starts doing odd jobs at the blind school, and he befriends and helps a blind boy called Timothy who has failed to respond to Hester-Sue. When she sees the change in Timothy, she calls off her wedding, and tells Joe there might be a chance for them yet. Guest cast: Keith Mitchell as Timothy, Moses Gunn as Joe Kagan, Mel Stewart as Hertzell Lundy, Starletta DuPois as Freda, Simeon Holloway as minister, De'voreaux White as Gideon, Randy Gray as Wayne, Tyrrell Winfrey as organist, and Elisha Rapson as student
151	16	"Goodbye, Mrs. Wilder"	William F. Claxton	Don Balluck	February 2, 1981	7066
An official from the Board of Education visits to assess the Walnut Grove school for state funding and he suggests that the curriculum should be extended. At a subsequent town meeting, Laura clashes with Mrs. Oleson over what changes should be made and, when Mr. Oleson abstains and the meeting votes against her, Laura resigns and challenges Mrs. Oleson to take over the teaching, a task she gleefully accepts. She introduces lessons in French and art appreciation, and also a dress code, to the consternation of most pupils and many parents. Albert organizes a class rebellion against the innovations, but Laura admonishes them and surprises Mrs. Oleson by speaking up in her favor. However, when the state official returns, he says the funding will only be provided if the new curriculum subjects are those Laura wanted, so Mrs. Oleson steps down and Laura is reinstated as the teacher. Guest cast: Walker Edmiston as Mr. Stohler, Dennis Dimster as Ralph Parker, Cletus Young as Cole Parker, Gillian Grant as Hildy, Terry Wagner-Otis as Waif, and Patrick Armstrong as Jed
152	17	"Sylvia"	Michael Landon	Michael Landon	February 9, 1981	7067
153	18	"Sylvia"	Michael Landon	Michael Landon	February 16, 1981	7068
Part 1: A new girl in town, petite but buxom Sylvia Webb, gets some unwelcome attention from the older boys at school, but her father and Mrs. Oleson both accuse her of leading the boys on. Her father in particular is quite enraged, claiming that her late mother had a devil in her which killed her upon Sylvia's birth, and it lives on through her. Albert spends much time with her and they fall in love. Then Sylvia is raped in the woods by a masked assailant, but Mr. Webb, fearful of the townspeople's reaction, insists she keep it a secret. Later, Sylvia collapses at school, and Albert and Laura take her to Doc Baker who discovers that she is pregnant. When Sylvia and her father refuse to explain, Albert comes under suspicion. Part 2: Sylvia's father decides that they must leave Walnut Grove. Mrs. Oleson spreads the news around the town, suggesting that Albert is the father. Sylvia and Albert meet secretly and plan to elope. To raise money, Albert gets a job with the town's blacksmith, Irv Hartwig. When Mr. Webb finds out that Sylvia is still seeing Albert, he grabs his shotgun and goes to the Ingalls' house. They manage to convince him that Albert did not make Sylvia pregnant, but Sylvia has run off. As they search for her, the mystery rapist (revealed to be Hartwig) attacks both Sylvia and Albert, then is shot down by Mr. Webb. During the confrontation, Sylvia suffers a bad fall, and she later dies in the arms of a distraught, heartbroken Albert. Guest cast: Olivia Barash as Sylvia Webb, and Richard Jaeckel as Irv Hartwig, Royal Dano as Mr. Hector Webb, Terry Nani as Boy #1, Bradley Green as Boy #2, and Carl Pitti as Man #1
154	19	"Blind Justice"	Maury Dexter	Carole & Michael Raschella	February 23, 1981	7069
Adam returns to Sleepy Eye, having completed his studies and become a lawyer, but a promised job at a local law firm falls through. Adam and Mary decide to leave the blind school in the care of Hester-Sue, and they return to Walnut Grove, where Adam opens a law firm of his own. He takes on as his first client a man accused of fraud, after the failure of a land investment deal resulted in many of the citizens of Walnut Grove losing their money. The initially angry and violent reaction from the townsfolk changes when the full story emerges at his trial. Guest cast: Jeff Corey as Edgar Mills, Peter Hobbs as Atty. Arthur Davis, John Zaremba as Judge Adams, Dub Taylor as Houston Lamb, James Brodhead as William Sykes, William S. Forester as Dr. Howard Ruddy, Barbara Collentine as Edna Mills, William Bramley as Jed Finley, Vivian Brown as secretary, Michelle Downey as Susan 'Sue' Goodspeed, Jack Lilley as stage driver, Peter Griggs as bailiff, Donald Brenon as jury Foreman, Marion Scherer as Blonde
155	20	"I Do, Again"	William F. Claxton	Don Balluck	March 2, 1981	7070
When Laura announces that she is expecting a baby, Caroline says that she is also. Later, she finds out from Doc Baker that she is not expecting but is experiencing an early menopause and cannot have any more children. This devastates Caroline, who has tried to birth a surviving true male heir for Charles and fears she is worthless to him now because this is now impossible. She falls into depression, so Charles, himself heartbroken upon learning that he will never have the chance of another natural son, takes Caroline on a trip to Wisconsin for the wedding of the son of an old friend, and there they decide to renew their own wedding vows. Guest cast: James Gallery as Ed Poulsen, Sarah Miller as Eunice Poulsen, Dolores Albin as Ada Phipps, and Hugh Warden as Amos Phipps
156	21	"The Lost Ones"	Michael Landon	Don Balluck	May 4, 1981	7071
157	22	"The Lost Ones"	Michael Landon	Don Balluck	May 11, 1981	7072
Part 1: Charles and Albert go on a delivery run for Jonathan Garvey, and they travel with the Cooper family (parents Alvin and Sarah, 11-year-old James and 8-year-old Cassandra) who are on their way to join Alvin's Uncle Jed on a gold claim. Encountering a steep hill, Charles and Albert (with James and Cassandra in the back of their wagon) descend safely, but Alvin loses control of his wagon which overturns, killing him and Sarah instantly. When the children's Uncle Jed tells Charles he is too old to take care of them, Charles feels he has a responsibility to find a new home for them. After exploring various possibilities, Charles is persuaded by Albert to take the children back to Walnut Grove to search for a foster family there. Part 2: James and Cassandra settle in happily with the Ingalls family. Then Rev. Alden finds a family who agree to take in the orphans, but the husband, Isaiah Tomkins, is a harsh man who works the children to exhaustion, resulting in Laura warning them that they are failing at school. Also, the Tomkins' own son bitterly resents their arrival and sets up James for an unjust whipping. Eventually, James and Cassandra run away, and after Mr. Tomkins declines to help in searching for them, Charles sets off with Almanzo and Adam. When he finds James and Cassandra, he tells them that they will be going home with him, and they joyfully agree. Guest cast: E. J. André as Uncle Jed, George McDaniel as Alvin Cooper, M.E. Loree as Sarah Cooper, Ivan Bonar as Mr. Case, Elizabeth Hoffman as Miss Mason, Dan Priest as conductor, Herb Armstrong as Halstead, Len Wayland as Isaiah Tomkins, Barbara Tarbuck as Beth Tomkins, Randy Norton as Seth Tomkins, and Elisha Rapson as student

=== Season 8 (1981–1982) ===
No. overall	No. in season	Title	Directed by	Written by	Original release date	Prod. code
158	1	"The Reincarnation of Nellie"	Michael Landon	Michael Landon	October 5, 1981	8402
159	2	"The Reincarnation of Nellie"	Michael Landon	Michael Landon	October 12, 1981	8403
Part 1: Nellie and Percival move to New York City to run Percival's family's store after the death of his father. Then Adam and Mary also move there when Adam takes a position at his late father's law firm. The blind school in Sleepy Eye has been taken under the control of the state, so Hester-Sue moves to Walnut Grove to help Caroline run the restaurant and hotel. Harriet becomes very depressed, and Doc Baker suggests she and Nels adopt, but it takes a visit from Cassandra to revive Harriet's spirits. At the orphanage in Sleepy Eye, Harriet's wish is realized when she finds a young girl named Nancy who reminds her of Nellie and of Harriet herself as a child. Nancy quickly causes trouble at the school in Walnut Grove, but Laura has already worked out that Nancy is another Nellie. Part 2:Nancy tricks her new brother Willie into locking a classroom rival in the ice-house all night. She convinces Doc Baker and the Olesons that she was not responsible, but Albert and Willie work out the truth and foil her plot. Later, the adults learn that Nancy's account that she had been recently abandoned by her mother was untrue, and that her mother actually died while giving birth to Nancy, and she had since been moved from orphanage to orphanage because of her incorrigible behavior. Eventually, Laura and the other school children scheme together to play a trick on Nancy at the school's charity bazaar and seem to succeed in teaching her a lesson. Guest cast: Ivan Bonar as Mr. Case, Elizabeth Hoffman as Miss Mason, Melora Hardin as Belinda Stevens, Dan McBride as customer #2, Dick Armstrong as customer #1, Gillian Grant as Cindy, and Leroy Sweet as Burly Customer, Lawrence Bame as Mr. Stevens, and Shanee Edwards as Mavis
160	3	"Growin' Pains"	Maury Dexter	Larry Bischof	October 19, 1981	8401
Charles and Caroline are finding life stressful trying to bring up five children in their crowded house, and Albert is not enjoying being an older brother to James who is having problems trying to fit into the family. After James is caught out in a lie and having stolen from the Mercantile, he runs away from home. Albert goes after him and, using some reverse psychology, tells him that he is running away too. During a severe thunderstorm, the two take refuge in an old house where they receive an unexpected welcome, and they settle their differences and return home. Guest cast: Aaron Fletcher as Mr. Tibbs, Tricia Cast as Jenny, Dan McBride as Bixler, Justin Randi as Danny, Lawrence Moran as Tom, and Carl Pitti as wagon driver
161	4	"Dark Sage"	Maury Dexter	Vince Gutierrez	October 26, 1981	8405
Doc Baker hires a highly qualified doctor named Caleb Ledoux, but is disconcerted to discover that he is black. Despite a friendly welcome from the Ingalls, other citizens are indifferent or openly hostile, while Doc Baker gives his new assistant only menial tasks. Eventually, when Doc Baker is unavailable for a call, Charles has to resort to desperate measures to enable Dr. Ledoux to attend to a pregnant mother experiencing complications during childbirth. Ledoux safely delivers the baby, but angrily decides he will never be accepted in the town and plans to leave. When Doc Baker makes an impassioned plea at the next church service and is supported by the congregation, Dr. Ledoux decides to stay. Guest cast: Don Marshall as Caleb Ledoux, Marlene Warfield as Mattie Ledoux, John Shearin as Nathan Sherman, Anne E. Curry as Jenny Sherman, and Ruth Foster as Melinda Foster
162	5	"A Wiser Heart"	Michael Landon	Chris Abbott	November 2, 1981	8404
Laura is invited by Eliza Jane to attend a college class on 'Great American Writers' in Arizona, and on the train she meets a man, Mort, who is going to the same class and who takes a liking to Eliza Jane. However, she only has eyes for their class professor, but he causes problems between the two women when he propositions Laura. To pay her way, Laura has to work long hours as a dishwasher. Later, Eliza Jane is dismayed when she finds out the truth about the professor, but when Mort stands up for Laura against the professor, Eliza Jane says she will support Mort's application for a vacant teaching post at her school in Minneapolis, and they leave together on the train. Guest cast: Patrick Collins as Mortimer Carstairs, Joe Lambie as William Woestehoff, Lucy Lee Flippin as Eliza Jane Wilder, Darlene Conley as Mrs. Pierce, Kathryn Fuller as Miss Ott, George Petrie as Ralph Waldo Emerson, Leslie Landon as Pam, Casey Erickson as delivery boy, Warner McKay as ticket vendor, Frank Kennedy as conductor, Brett Miller as waiter, Kaley Ward as Emily, R. Michael Fierro as student, and John Richard Petersen as student
163	6	"Gambini the Great"	Michael Landon	Jeri Taylor	November 9, 1981	8406
Most of the people of Walnut Grove, including Harriet Oleson, are excited by the arrival of Gambini the Great, an aging circus daredevil, but when Albert and Willie try to replicate some of his stunts, Charles and Nels are not impressed. Albert starts to spend all his spare time training with Gambini, but is brought down to earth when one of the daredevil's most dangerous stunts goes wrong. Guest cast: Jack Kruschen as Rudolpho 'The Great' Gambini, Stephen Manley as Marco Gambini, Gloria Manos as Anna Rosa, Martha Nix as Amy Cassidy. Robert Torti as Stefano Gambini, William Keene as ringmaster, William A. Forester as Dr. Abbott, Carl Pitti as 1st Townsman, and Sean A. McGaughy as 2nd Townsman
164	7	"The Legend of Black Jake"	Michael Landon	Chris Abbott	November 16, 1981	8407
This is a comedy episode, in which Nels is kidnapped by a pair of bumbling criminals who demand a $100 ransom, which Harriet refuses to pay. Nels then plots his own escape and his revenge upon Harriet, which gets out of hand when it leads to several other members of the community also being kidnapped. Guest cast: Todd Susman as Max, Royce D. Applegate as Georgie, Sam Edwards as Mr. Bill Anderson, Gavin Mooney as policeman, Ruth Foster as Melinda Foster, and Carl Pitti as townsman
165	8	"Chicago"	Michael Landon	John Hawkins & B.W. Sandefur	November 23, 1981	8411
Charles visits grief-stricken Mr. Edwards in Chicago after his adopted son John Jr. dies in an apparent street accident. Working with Callahan, deputy editor of the newspaper John Jr. was working for, their inquiries rouse their suspicions over the circumstances of his death, and lead them to uncover political and business corruption which John Jr. was investigating. It becomes clear that John Jr. was murdered, and Charles and Edwards and Callahan bring the villains to justice. Guest cast: M. Emmet Walsh as Callahan, and Ernie Hudson as William Thomas, a ditch worker, John C. Becher as Mr. Golden, Lillian Adams as Mrs. Baxter, Ernie Hudson as William Thomas, Herb Mitchell as workman, Lorinne Vozoff as nurse, Will MacMillan as bartender, Ruth Foster as Melinda Foster, and Jack Lilley as wagon driver
166	9	"For the Love of Nancy"	Maury Dexter	Chris Abbott	November 30, 1981	8408
When Mrs. Oleson leaves town for a week on a buying trip for the Mercantile, Nancy again feels that everybody hates her so she gets in being nasty first, including fighting with Cassandra (which has been a counterpart to the past fights between Laura and Nellie). Then an obesely overweight boy, Elmer, joins the school and is teased by his classmates, but he is a bright student and Nancy exploits his attraction to her. Albert and Willie see what she is doing and get her into trouble with Laura, but Nancy blames Elmer who decides to quit school, so the boys have to put things right. Guest cast: J. Brennan Smith as Elmer Miles, Elizabeth Rogers as Mrs. Miles, Charles Shull as Mr. Miles, Michael P. Alan as Joey, Carl Steven as Jess Miles, Ruth Foster as Melinda Foster, and Carl Pitti as stage driver
167	10	"Wave of the Future"	Maury Dexter	Jeri Taylor	December 7, 1981	8409
With Caroline and Hester-Sue run off their feet at the restaurant, Harriet signs up with a franchise which promises greater efficiency and more profit, and the restaurant is renamed "Mrs. Sullivan's Kitchen". Unfortunately, Harriet has not read the small print in the contract, and the onerous conditions result in everyone's life becoming even more busy. When Charles reluctantly has to take over the cooking at home, he gets together with Nels to work on a plan to release Harriet from her contract and get things back to normal. Guest cast: Laurie Main as Major Guffey, Roger Bowen as advertising man, Margaret Wheeler as lady, John A. Roberts as bearded man, Elmore Vincent as Ernest, Anita Keith as Mrs. Matlock. Phil Chambers as Mr. Matlock, Mona Bruns as customer, Dan McBride as Mr. Taylor, Ruth Foster as Melinda Foster, David Carlile as photographer, Carl Pitti as driver, Bill Walker as townsman and Clyde Harper as customer
168	11	"A Christmas They Never Forgot"	Michael Landon	Don Balluck	December 21, 1981	8410
Adam and Mary make a surprise visit to Walnut Grove for Christmas. They arrive with Hester-Sue and join the family with Laura and Almanzo. Soon after, a fierce blizzard snows them in, and they all have to stay the night. Caroline, Almanzo, Laura and Hester-Sue recall Christmas memories from when they were children.. Guest cast: Newell Alexander as Frederick Holbrook, Tom Lester as Mr. Wilder, Victor French as Isaiah Edwards (archive footage), Eddy C. Dyer as Poppa Terhune, Helby Ziroe as Momma Terhune, Alene Wilson as Young Hester-Sue, Don Dubbins as Master Hayes, Holly Villaire as Charlotte Holbrook, Melissa Sue Anderson as Mary Ingalls Kendall, Maggie Gwinn as Mrs. Wilder, Jerry Supiran as Young Almanzo, Kathy Pazoff as Young Eliza Jane, Rebecca Wolfe as Young Alice, Dago Dimster as Young Royal, Sheri Strahl as Young Caroline, Vernon Barnwell as Boy #1, Rodney Booker as Boy #2, Kathleen McNaughton as Emily, Oliver Aubrey as Santa Claus, and Elisha Rapson as student
169	12	"No Beast So Fierce"	Michael Landon	Carole and Michael Raschella	January 11, 1982	8412
James makes friends with Gideon Hale, a new young boy in school who stutters, but then Gideon catches James joining in the laughter at Willie's pretend stutter, and a distraught Gideon runs away from home. While the townspeople search for him, Charles takes James along on a shipping trip to Minneapolis. A feral wolf-dog takes a liking to James and tags along throughout their journey. Caroline finds Gideon and persuades him to go home, and the wolfdog plays a key role in resolving the rift between James and Gideon. Guest cast: Peter Billingsley as Gideon Hale, Dennis Howard as Braden Hale, Jennifer Rhodes as Mrs. Hale, Robert Boon as Sven Johanssen, Robert Hoy as Morgan, Jerry Wills as Sticks, John J. Fox as bartender, Wayne Hall as Jed, and Lori Sparling as Hildy
170	13	"Stone Soup"	Maury Dexter	Peter Dixon	January 18, 1982	8413
Laura and Almanzo have invested all their money in trees for an orchard. Then Almanzo joins Charles in a well-paid job hauling mining equipment to Arizona which takes them away for two months. Laura has a serious talk to Willie about responsibility, which he takes seriously, particularly after Laura (now five months pregnant) collapses from heat stroke trying to save the orchard during a heatwave. When Caroline tells the story of "Stone Soup" at school, Willie and Albert enlist their classmates to help the local farmers deal with the drought, starting with Laura and Almanzo's orchard. Guest cast: John Miranda as Farmer #1, Donald Elson as Farmer #2, Brandon Goldstein as Jimmy, Ruth Foster as Melinda Foster, and Richard Lilley as townsperson (as Dick Lilley)
171	14	"The Legacy"	Michael Landon	Vince R. Gutierrez	January 25, 1982	8414
Charles and a friend, Jack Prescott, deliver some tables, hand-made by Charles, to a store in Minneapolis, for which Charles makes a few "as a hobby". After Jack dies suddenly of a heart attack on the return trip, and after which his farm is sold and his nameplate casually tossed into the kindling by the new owner, Charles decides he wants to do something to be remembered for. He agrees to move to the city to work full-time on producing the tables for a trial period before selling the farm and moving the entire family and things go well at first, until a big furniture manufacturer copies the table and underprices them. Sales dry up and Charles decides that his greatest legacy will be his children. But later, one of his tables with his 'CI' mark is bought as a prized antique at an auction approximately 100 years later in the then present day (1982). Guest cast: Claude Earl Jones as Jack Prescott, Robert Boon as Sven Johanssen, J.S. 'Joe' Young as Uriah Cooper, Pamela Murphy as Linda Martin, Ken Smolka as Bob Martin, June Whitley Taylor as Dolphia Prescott, Paul Larson as Addison Fisk, Pitt Herbert as Taylor, Kurt Smildsin as Josh Bennett, William P. O'Hagan as Marvin, Wade Wallace as Matthew Prescott, Pat Destro as Sara Prescott, Maurice Kowalewski as Hastings, George Barclay as auctioneer, and Maggie Brown as Birdie Bennett
172	15	"Uncle Jed"	Maury Dexter	Don Balluck	February 1, 1982	8415
James and Cassandra's granduncle Jed comes to Walnut Grove to visit them. He is now wealthy, having finally hit a big gold strike, and a donation to pay for a new roof for the church makes him popular in town. He also gets along well with James and Cassandra, so he decides that he can now offer them a home with him in Minneapolis. When the children choose to stay with the Ingalls, Jed reluctantly resorts to the law to gain custody. But then he finds out that his health is failing, so he tells the children he will let them stay with the Ingalls. Guest cast: E.J. André as Jed Cooper, Wiley Harker as Judge Barrow, Claude Woolman as Philip Loring, and Carl Pitti as stage driver
173	16	"Second Chance"	Maury Dexter	Don Balluck	February 8, 1982	8416
Hester-Sue's ex-husband, Sam Terhune, comes to Walnut Grove claiming he has reformed himself from his drinking and gambling and asking for a second chance with her. Although she is initially suspicious and cautious, Hester-Sue eventually gives in to her feeling that she still loves him, and it is not long before they plan to re-marry. However, on the wedding day, some surprise visitors show up, and Hester-Sue sadly realizes that, despite his good intentions, Sam has not changed. But Hester-Sue now has, and she forgives him. Guest cast: J. A. Preston as Sam Terhune, Ketty Lester as Hester-Sue Terhune, Marguerite DeLain as Naomi Terhune, William Edward Phipps as Myron Hicks, Jack Perkins as bartender, Norman Rice as croupier, Ruth Foster as Melinda Foster, Dan McBride as customer, Lexie Neal as saloon girl, and Richard Lilley as townsman
174	17	"Days of Sunshine, Days of Shadow"	Michael Landon	Don Balluck	February 15, 1982	8417
175	18	"Days of Sunshine, Days of Shadow"	Michael Landon	Chris Abbott	February 22, 1982	8418
Part 1: Almanzo falls ill with diphtheria, and with Laura heavily pregnant, Charles goes to great lengths to help them. While Almanzo is recovering, there is a hailstorm which threatens their crop, and he rushes out into the storm in a panic and suffers a stroke. In the aftermath, he bitterly resigns himself to life as a 'cripple', and Laura welcomes the arrival of Eliza Jane. But they have different ideas about what will be best for Almanzo. Part 2: Almanzo grows more and more depressed after his stroke and refuses to perform his therapy, and even the birth of his daughter, Rose, doesn't help. Laura continues to clash with Eliza Jane, who wants them all to move to Minneapolis. Then Laura is injured when a tornado strikes, and she becomes angry when she discovers the calamitous effect upon their house. Seeing her anger, Almanzo is inspired to pitch in and help rebuild the house. Guest cast: Lucy Lee Flippin as Eliza Jane Wilder, Eddie Quillan as old timer, Sam Edwards as Mr. Bill Anderson, Bill McLennan as Mr. Walsh, and Ruth Foster as Melinda Foster, Dean Butler as Almanzo James Wilder, Dee Croxton as Mrs. Jackson, Nathan Adler as Mr. Jackson, and Jennifer Coleman-Donati as Rose Wilder
176	19	"A Promise to Keep"	Michael Landon	Vince R. Gutierrez	March 1, 1982	8419
Laura and Almanzo's new house is completed and he has fully recovered his health. Then Mr. Edwards returns to Walnut Grove, but he hides that his marriage to Grace has failed because of his relapse into alcoholism. When he drunkenly causes an accident that nearly kills Albert, Charles angrily tells his old friend to leave town. However, Laura persuades him to stay, and he works on the farm with Almanzo and sobers up. But after more bad news, Mr. Edwards ends up in church where he prays and talks to Rev. Alden, who brings about a reconciliation with Charles. Laura and Almanzo's daughter Rose is baptized and Mr. Edwards becomes her godfather. Guest cast: Corinne Camacho as Grace Snider Edwards, Kyle Richards as Alicia Sanderson Edwards, David Kaufman as Carl Edwards, Victor French as Isaiah Edwards, Charles Young as cowboy, Jack Perkins as barkeep, Duane Tucker as workman, Ruth Foster as Melinda Foster, Richard Lilley as man #1, Hal Burton as driver, Jennifer Steffin and Michelle Steffin as Rose Wilde
177	20	"A Faraway Cry"	Maury Dexter	Story by : Pamela Balluck and Don Balluck; Teleplay by : Don Balluck	March 8, 1982	8420
Caroline responds to a plea for help from her childhood friend, Louisa Beckwith, by traveling with Doc Baker to a mining camp where there is an influenza outbreak. After losing two previous pregnancies to miscarriage, Louisa is again pregnant and desperately ill, with a cruel husband Horace who hates children and only sees wives as someone to cook and clean. Caroline nurses her and sees loathingly to Horace's basic needs until he threatens her after which she lashes back with a fire torch. She and Doc Baker organize the remaining healthy camp residents to treat the sick. Camp resident Helen Andruss is due at virtually the same time as Louisa and she and her husband Sherman are distraught over a potentially fatal breech birth. Helen's birth is indeed a breech and the baby dies. Louisa bears a healthy baby boy, but dies in childbirth. As Louisa is now no longer there to stick up for her son and Horace is openly hostile toward children, especially girls, Caroline and Doc Baker are faced with a moral dilemma but eventually make the decision to let Helen and Sherman raise the Beckwith boy as their own in a loving home with two parents. Guest cast: Brion James as Amos, Ruth Silveira as Louisa Beckwith, Cal Bartlett as Horace Beckwith, James Griffith as preacher Bob, Dennis Lipscomb as Sherman Andruss, Betty McGuire as Nora Cramer, Judith Weston as Helen Andruss, Linda Hoy as Katherine Parker, Tom Pletts as Arnie Cramer, Eric Milota as Jeffrey. Jack Stryker as 1st man, Tom Rosqui as 2nd man, Will MacMillan as 3rd man, Alex Sharp as Andy, Barbara Beaman as woman, and Lila Waters as another woman
178	21	"He Was Only Twelve"	Michael Landon	Paul W. Cooper	May 3, 1982	8421
179	22	"He Was Only Twelve"	Michael Landon	Michael Landon	May 10, 1982	8422
Part 1: Charles, Albert, James and Mr. Edwards travel to Sleepy Eye on business. James, wanting to open a savings account with his birthday check from Uncle Jed, walks into the bank as it is being robbed. James is shot and critically wounded, and the doctor tells Charles that the injuries are potentially fatal. Charles and Mr. Edwards, and later Albert, against Charles's orders, set out to track down the villains. Part 2: James remains comatose after a successful operation to remove the bullet. Charles refuses to accept Doc Baker's prognosis that James will not recover, because he believes God has told him James will be healed. When his family and friends question if he is losing his grip on reality, Charles takes James away into the woods, and builds a shelter and a stone altar. Refusing to leave until James recovers, Charles prays to God for a miracle. Guest cast: Chris Hendrie as Coy, John Dennis Johnston as Lawrence, Tom Roy Lowe as Leon. Bill Vint as Escal, R. D. Call as Dwayne, Victor French as Isaiah Edwards, Hal Smith as Trumble, Doug McGrath as Harkness, Lionel Decker as doctor, Robert Telford as gun proprietor, Sam Theard as swamper at Wooden Nickel, Eldon Quick as teller, Nancy B. Berggren as Aggie, Paul Smith as bartender at Wooden Nickel, John Kelly as Sheriff, Don Beddoe as old man, Martin Rudy as Dr. Stanfill, and Georg Olden as Danny

=== Season 9: A New Beginning (1982–1983) ===
No. overall	No. in season	Title	Directed by	Written by	Original release date	Prod. code
180	1	"Times Are Changing"	Maury Dexter	Michael Landon	September 27, 1982	8451
181	2	"Times Are Changing"	Maury Dexter	Michael Landon	October 4, 1982	8452
Part 1: In the spring of 1887, Charles, having suffered a hard winter and wanting to pursue a promising life, has moved the family to Burr Oak, Iowa. He completes the sale of their homestead to the Carter family from New York City, and is given a farewell party by his friends. John Carter is the new town blacksmith and his wife Sarah starts a newspaper, the Walnut Grove Gazette. Four months later, Laura announces her resignation from Walnut Grove School to raise Rose at home and introduces the kids to their new teacher, Etta Plum. Almanzo's older brother, Royal, arrives with his daughter, Jenny Wilder, and with a devastating secret: he is terminally ill and the true reason he is visiting Walnut Grove is to give Jenny a chance to get to know Laura and Almanzo, who will become her adoptive parents. Part 2: The Carters, including their sons Jeb and Jason, adjust to life in Walnut Grove, but Jenny has a hard time doing so after her father dies. She blames herself and Laura for her father's death, saying that she should have been told that he was ill. After Reverend Alden assures her that she will see her parents again in heaven, Jenny tries to drown herself to join them, but Jeb conquers his fear of water and dives in and saves her. Then Laura teaches Jenny a "tough love" lesson on the importance of life, as Charles had done for her. Guest cast: Nicholas Pryor as Royal Wilder
182	3	"Welcome to Olesonville"	Maury Dexter	Paul W. Cooper	October 11, 1982	8454
Mrs. Oleson finds an old Walnut Grove Bearer Bond and, claiming that she is owed over $14,000 in unpaid interest, uses it to have the town renamed Olesonville. However, when she wants her compliant husband elected as mayor, she encounters unexpected opposition from some of the town's oldest inhabitants. Guest cast: Lew Ayres as Lem McCary, Charles Lane as Jess Moffet, Sam Edwards as Mr. Bill Anderson, Norma Ransome as Maddy Sutherland, Noni White as Elsie Moffet, Elmore Vincent as Floyd, Ruth Foster as Melinda Foster, Carl Pitti as Dance Caller, Doc Livingston as farmer #1, Thomas Murphy as farmer #2, Clyde Harper as pig farmer, Bruce Andre as Wrangler, Paul Bradley as townsman at debate, Jennifer Steffin and Michelle Steffin as Rose Wilder, and Tom Willett as cowboy
183	4	"Rage"	Maury Dexter	B. W. Sandefur	October 18, 1982	8456
A farmer named Mr. Stark is denied a loan at the bank and soon goes bankrupt. He flies into a terrible rage and shoots his wife and daughter, and takes off. The citizens of Walnut Grove organize a posse to track him down, but, as they are searching for him, he chances upon the Wilders' house, and Laura and Jenny must rely on their wits to escape from a dangerous situation. Guest cast: Robert Loggia as Thomas Stark, Michele Marsh as Constance Stark, Tammy Lauren as Elizabeth Stark, and Ronnie Scribner as Randall Page, J. Edward McKinley as Phillips, Kurt Smildsin as Tracy, and Jennifer Coleman-Donati, Sarah Coleman, Jennifer Steffin and Michelle Steffin as Rose Wilder
184	5	"Little Lou"	Victor French	Michael Landon	October 25, 1982	8453
A widowed circus man and young father named Little Lou makes a promise to his wife to quit the circus and move to Walnut Grove to try to make a living after his wife dies during childbirth. He interviews for a job at the bank, but a prejudiced Mrs. Oleson refuses to do business as long as he is employed there. Jobless, Little Lou begins stealing from the Mercantile to support his baby daughter. Just before he is set to go on trial for theft, Nancy falls down a well, and Little Lou is the only one who can reach inside to save her. Mrs. Oleson realizes how wrong she was and gets the charges dropped against Lou, who gets the job at the bank. Guest cast: Billy Barty as Little Lou, Susan French as Mrs. Bates, Patty Maloney as Alice Bates, Sam Edwards as Mr. Bill Anderson, Ruth Foster Melinda Foster, Jennifer Steffin and Michelle Steffin as Rose Wilder, and Steve 'Bunker' de France as customer
185	6	"The Wild Boy"	Victor French	Vince R. Gutierrez	November 1, 1982	8457
186	7	"The Wild Boy"	Victor French	Vince R. Gutierrez	November 8, 1982	8458
Part 1: Dr. McQueen, an unscrupulous traveling medicine man, visits Walnut Grove to sell his elixir and promote his sideshow attraction, the "Wild Boy", a wild-looking boy in a cage who goes mad when McQueen beats him with a stick for the entertainment of his customers. When the Walnut Grove children sneak into the tent and Nancy pokes the boy with a stick, Jenny defends him. Later, the boy escapes and takes refuge in the Wilders' barn. Jenny finds him there and befriends him, and she discovers he is not really wild, only mute and tortured, and that his name is Matthew Rogers. Then Almanzo and Laura discover Matthew is regularly beaten by McQueen and given morphine elixir. While they try to keep Matthew safe with Mr. Edwards, McQueen posts a reward for the boy's return, which Nancy hopes to claim. Part 2: Laura has taught Matthew, Jenny and Mr. Edwards sign language and Matthew has become accepted by many of the adults and children of the town. However, Nancy, whose mind is focused on the large reward, leads McQueen to Mr. Edwards. This initiates a custody battle between McQueen and Mr. Edwards. The judge initially decides to have Matthew placed in a mental hospital for his protection, but after a heartfelt and tearful speech by Mr. Edwards, he allows Matthew to stay with him in Walnut Grove as long as he keeps it quiet. Guest cast: Anthony Zerbe as Dr. McQueen, Jonathan Hall Kovacs as Matthew Rogers, David Hooks as Luther, Ancel Cook as farmer #1, Steve 'Bunker' de France as farmer Tom, Jennifer Steffin and Michelle Steffin as Rose Wilder, and Walter Brooke as Judge Simpson
187	8	"The Return of Nellie"	Maury Dexter	Don Balluck	November 15, 1982	8459
Nellie returns to Walnut Grove, and most of her family try to make it the best visit ever. But what will happen if Nancy does not get the attention she normally gets? Guest cast: Alison Arngrim as Nellie Oleson Dalton, Ruth Foster as Melinda Foster, Jennifer Coleman-Donati and Sarah Coleman as Rose Wilder, Jack Lilley as 2nd stage driver, and Richard Lilley and Rod McGaughy as townsmen
188	9	"The Empire Builders"	Joseph Pevney	Larry Jensen	November 22, 1982	8460
The railroad is coming to Walnut Grove, and with it the promise of jobs and economic growth. But that joy turns sour when the townspeople learn the side effects: the railroad needs property easements, forcing many farmers from their homes, and plenty of ill repute to boot. Guest cast: Stephen Elliott as Spencer Hollingsworth, James O'Sullivan as Stewart Hobson, Taylor Lacher as Harlam Wilkins, Ross Elliott as Atty. Webb, Hugh Warden as ticket agent, Leroy Sweet as Collins, Chuck Hicks as Big Arnie, R.L. Tolbert as Hank, Bob Terhune as Herb, David Wiley as businessman, Charles Young as 1st Thug, Robert Balderson as Lester, Steve Jesse Starr as express manager, James L. Kelly as Foreman, Dan McBride and Rod McGaughy as men, and Jennifer Coleman-Donati and Sarah Coleman as Rose Wilder
189	10	"Love"	Victor Lobl	Paul W. Cooper	November 29, 1982	8462
Jane Canfield, a childhood friend of Laura's who attended the blind school, visits Walnut Grove and falls in love with Mr. Edwards. He encourages Jane to have a new surgical treatment which restores her sight, and her feelings for him do not change when she sees he is much older than she. Mr. Edwards also loves Jane, but he faces hostile opinion in town, and when Laura is reluctant to offer her unqualified support for their love match, he rejects Jane and she leaves town. Guest cast: Jill Schoelen as Jane Canfield, Walker Edmiston as Dr. Vanderan, M.E. Loree as woman, Elmore Vincent as Floyd, Lorrie Blower as nurse Nelson, Frederic Downs as storekeeper, Justin Bayly as boy, and Jennifer Steffin and Michelle Steffin as Rose Wilder
190	11	"Alden's Dilemma"	Maury Dexter	Don Balluck	December 6, 1982	8461
A traveling minister is planning a surprise for Rev. Alden; he is arranging a house for him in Walnut Grove. But this truth does not come to light until Rev. Alden concludes his congregation is planning to leave him. Meanwhile Almanzo and Mr. Carter travel to San Francisco for the Grange with a series of humorous adventures including the culture shock of a Japanese hotel, bathhouse, and eating with chopsticks, getting arrested after a false accusation by the very old lady who pick-pocketed them, and sneaking home aboard a dingy cattle car with a single apple to split.
191	12	"Marvin's Garden"	Michael Rhodes	Michael Landon	January 3, 1983	8463
The aging Dr. Marvin Haynes is losing his sight and knows he will soon have to retire. Meanwhile, Jenny goes swimming with a group of friends and nearly drowns while looking for her locket in the lake. Jeb jumps back into the lake and is able to save her in time, but not before her brain is partly damaged and she is unable to walk, talk, and use her hands normally. Dr. Marvin convinces Laura to let Jenny help him with his garden to rehabilitate. She regains her original stamina and also turns out to be Dr. Marvin's last patient because of his failing eyesight. Guest cast: Ralph Bellamy as Dr. Marvin Haynes
192	13	"Sins of the Fathers"	Victor French	E. F. Wallengren	January 10, 1983	8464
Sarah Carter's imposing father Elliott Reed visits Walnut Grove. He starts to take over her newspaper, demand that she and the family move back to New York City and causes other problems for Sarah and the rest of her family in their own personal lives. Sarah eventually grows tired of being told what to do and stands up to her father. Sarah's father eventually sees the error of his ways and lets Sarah and her family stay in Walnut Grove. Guest cast: Elliott Reed as John McLiam, and Sheila Larken as Linda McAndrews
193	14	"The Older Brothers"	Victor French	Michael Landon	January 17, 1983	8455
Mr. Edwards, and later, Almanzo and John, become mixed up with the criminal activities of a bumbling gang of outlaws. Guest cast: Geoffrey Lewis as Cole Younger, Robert Donner as Bart Younger, and Timothy Scott as Lonnie Younger
194	15	"Once Upon a Time"	Maury Dexter	Don Balluck	January 24, 1983	8465
At Almanzo's urging, Laura enters a writing contest and produces a novel about the Ingalls family, which Almanzo and Jenny love. After travelling with Jenny to Minneapolis, Laura learns that she has won the contest and she is offered the opportunity to have her novel published. She reluctantly agrees to changes which the publishers want to make, but Jenny convinces Laura that the new version is not as good as her original and should not be published.
195	16	"Home Again"	Michael Landon	Michael Landon	February 7, 1983 (Note: Home Again originally aired as a single episode with a 120 minute runtime. It may air as two parts in syndication or on DVD sets.)	8467
Charles and Albert return to Walnut Grove after Albert has repeated run-ins with the law for curfew violations and theft. It is soon discovered that Albert is hooked on morphine, which increasingly causes his behavior to be violent and eventually leads Charles to take drastic measures to help his son withdraw from the drug. Discontinuity: The episode ends with Laura (Melissa Gilbert) narrating a voice-over that Albert would return to Walnut Grove years later as "Doctor Albert Ingalls." However, the first of the post-series movies, Little House: Look Back to Yesterday, features Albert diagnosed with a fatal blood disease (presumably leukemia) before being able to achieve a degree in medicine. Whether Albert's death actually took place is controversial because Albert is still alive, though seriously ill, at the end of the movie; most assume that Albert's death happened off-screen. Nonetheless, if Albert did indeed die before becoming a doctor, this would contradict Laura's narration. Also, Walnut Grove was destroyed in the post-series movie Little House: The Last Farewell, thus further contradicting Laura's narration.
196	17	"A Child with No Name"	Victor French	Don Balluck	February 14, 1983	8466
"In the late summer of 1889", Almanzo and Laura's newborn son dies overnight from no obvious cause after having been proclaimed healthy by Doc Baker when he delivered him. At the memorial, Laura loudly blames Doc Baker for her baby's death and insists that he leave the graveside service. Doc Baker's reputation is damaged to the point that residents of Walnut Grove begin leaving town for medical care and he decides to move away. Then Rose becomes sick with smallpox and, against Laura's wishes, Almanzo calls in Doc Baker, who has to stay with them in quarantine. After Rose recovers, Laura acknowledges that she had been wrong about the doctor and persuades him to stay.
197	18	"The Last Summer"	Maury Dexter	Duke Sandefur	February 21, 1983	8469
Jason begins doing odd jobs for an aging woman, Ruthy Leland. Sarah becomes jealous over the blossoming friendship, until Ruthy reveals her that she is dying. Jason makes plenty of happy memories with his friend before her death. Guest cast: Vera Miles as Ruthy Leland
198	19	"For the Love of Blanche"	Michael Landon	Michael Landon	March 7, 1983	8470
Mr. Edwards promises to care for a dying traveler's "baby," only to discover it to be an orangutan named Blanche, which makes quick friends with everyone except Nancy, who tries to swat the animal, only for it to fight back. Mrs. Oleson wants Blanche killed, but Mr. Edwards devises a plan to trick them into thinking Blanche is dead. Mr. Edwards decides that Blanche needs to live in a zoo. Later, Blanche saves Rose from a potentially deadly house fire that Jenny puts out, and when Jenny tells the story at school, Nancy finds out that Blanche is still alive. Mrs. Oleson demands that the sheriff make sure Blanche is dead this time, but the ape hides in a tree until the arrival of the zookeeper, who convinces the sheriff and Mrs. Oleson to let Blanche live.
199	20	"May I Have This Dance?"	Victor French	Chris Abbott	March 14, 1983	8471
Willie graduates and his mother expects him to go on to college, but Willie has fallen in love with his girlfriend Rachel Brown, and wants to marry and take over the running of the family's restaurant. Mrs. Oleson opposes his plans and cruelly insults Rachel, and when Willie stands up to his mother and defends Rachel against her, she vows not to show up at the wedding. In the event, she does go, but theatrically dressed in black funerial clothes. Nels later reminds Harriet that his mother similarly opposed their marriage, and he says he has never regretted it. Meanwhile, Mrs. Flannery, a childless elderly friend of Laura's, passes away after gifting her big house to Laura and Almanzo, who set about turning it into a boardinghouse, and Willie and Rachel move in as their first boarders.
200	21	"Hello and Goodbye"	Michael Landon	Don Balluck	March 21, 1983	8472
Matthew Rogers's natural father arrives in Walnut Grove, wanting to reclaim custody after years of searching for him. Initially, Matthew is angry that his parents abandoned him as a baby, but, after learning why they did it and receiving a gift of his late mother's Bible, Mr. Edwards helps him to decide to leave town to live with his father. A devastated Mr. Edwards decides he will move into Laura's new boarding house, where a multi-talented English writer named Sherwood Montague has also taken up residence. Guest cast: Jonathan Hall Kovacs as Matthew Rogers

== Post-series movie specials (1983–1984) ==
Title	Directed by	Written by	Original release date	Prod. code
Little House: Look Back to Yesterday	Victor French	Vince R. Gutierrez	December 12, 1983	8486
Burr Oak, Iowa: Charles is promoted to purchasing agent. He takes Albert on a buying trip to Minnesota. En route, they visit the University of Minnesota for Albert to pursue his medical endeavors. Reuniting with family and friends in Walnut Grove, Albert suffers serious nosebleeds and exhaustion, being diagnosed with leukemia. He remains in Walnut Grove for what may be his last days. Though weak and seriously ill, Albert is determined to spend the rest of his time in life doing all he can. Laura does not truly come to grips with Albert's possible imminent death, wishing he rest rather than exhaust himself. Albert falls in love with a long-time friend, Michele Pierson. Charles starts a cooperative with local farmers to compete with the larger farms. Albert, Laura, Michele, Miss Plum and the local school children make their annual climb to the "keepsake tree" atop Harper's Bluff, where Laura and Albert place their own keepsake in the box hidden there. Miss Plum and the children join hands in a circle around Laura and Albert, who join their own hands and raise them high, both in celebration and as a symbol of their bond.
Little House: The Last Farewell	Michael Landon	Michael Landon	February 6, 1984	0400
Charles and Caroline visit Walnut Grove and are pleased to be able to stay in the 'Little House' when John and Sarah Carter go out of town. Then the townspeople learn that a land development tycoon, Nathan Lassiter, has acquired title to all the land in Hero Township, which they had believed to be homesteading land. Having failed to defeat his claim on legal grounds and even with guns against an army cavalry unit, the townspeople are inspired by Laura to vent their anger at what they see as an injustice, and they decide upon a drastic plan of action. When Lassiter arrives to claim the town, he finds all the town buildings dynamited, and the townsfolk leave to start new lives elsewhere, as many of them have done before. He is forced to relent, however, when he is told that the leaders and businessmen of other nearby towns, having heard what happened in Walnut Grove, announce they will do the same thing. As Lassiter walks off in defeat, Reverend Alden loudly proclaims that Walnut Grove did not die in vain, prompting a huge celebration. Guest cast: James Karen as Nathan Lassiter
Little House: Bless All the Dear Children	Victor French	Chris Abbott-Fish	December 17, 1984	0407
Just before Christmas in 1896, Laura and Almanzo and Mr. Edwards are shopping for gifts in Mankato when Rose is kidnapped by a grief stricken mother, prompting a desperate search. A young orphan boy, Sam, stows away in their wagon and becomes a key player in the search and its happy outcome. Meanwhile, in Walnut Grove, Nels tries to get Nancy to contribute to the Olesons' Christmas but later regrets it; Jason tries to earn money for gifts with a Christmas tree delivery service which nobody wants; and Mr. Montague tries to avoid all the seasonal customs but ends up saving the Carters' Christmas.
