= Maggie Brown =

American actress and director (born 1948)

- Born: 1948 (age 77–78)
- Education: Southwest Missouri State University
- Occupations: Playwright, director, actress

Maggie Brown (born 1948) is an American playwright, director and actress.

== Education ==
Maggie Brown was raised in Independence, Missouri, and graduated from Southwest Missouri State University. After moving to New York City, she worked in theater as a performer with Time & Space, Ltd. theater company, and as Director of Children's Theatre at the Manhattan Theatre Club. As an acting teacher, she taught at the New York Association for the Blind, where she directed several Lighthouse Players productions, including The Little Foxes.

== Work ==
On television, she performed guest roles on series including Barney Miller, Dallas, Highway to Heaven and Little House on the Prairie, and appeared in more than 250 television commercials.

Her first script, Sophisticated Nuts and Dried Fruit (1982), was produced in Los Angeles as three one-act plays, and staged in 2001 at Eastern Connecticut State University. She and Kenn Salmon are co-authors of the plays Pat the Cat's Last Fling (1990) and Country Songbird with Wife.

As of 2011 and since writing Twelve Angry Jurors, Brown has performed with The Old Pros Theatre Group, a troupe of retired actors, musicians and dancers who stage productions for the Laguna Woods Village retirement community in Laguna Woods, California.
