= List of Land of the Giants episodes =

This is a list of episodes from the television series Land of the Giants, which ran for two seasons between 1968 and 1970. The list below gives original airdates, writer, director, guest stars, and brief synopsis information of each episode. All of the episodes were filmed in color.

== Series overview ==
Season	Episodes	Originally released	
Season	Episodes	First released	Last released
1	26	September 22, 1968	April 20, 1969
2	25	September 21, 1969	March 22, 1970

== Episodes ==
=== Season 1 (1968–69) ===
No. overall	No. in season	Title	Directed by	Written by	Original release date	Prod. code
1	1	"The Crash"	Irwin Allen	S : Irwin Allen; T : Anthony Wilson	September 22, 1968	2401
On June 12, 1983, suborbital passenger flight 612 (or Spindrift), on its way from Los Angeles to London, encounters a bizarre storm and is forced to make a crash landing. Those aboard – the crew: pilot Capt. Steve Burton (Gary Conway), co-pilot Dan Erickson (Don Marshall), stewardess Betty Hamilton (Heather Young), and passengers: engineer Mark Wilson (Don Matheson), pampered city girl and jet-setter Valerie Scott (Deanna Lund), bank robber (disguised as a naval commander) Alexander B. Fitzhugh (Kurt Kasznar), orphan boy Barry Lockridge (Stefan Arngrim) and his dog Chipper – find themselves in a mysterious land dominated by giants. While exploring, Steve and Valerie are captured by a giant scientist and the others mount a rescue. Guest Stars: Anne Dore (Giant Female), Don Watters (Giant Entomologist)
2	2	"Ghost Town"	Nathan Juran	S : Anthony Wilson; T : Gilbert Ralston & William Welch	September 29, 1968	2414
Barry is zapped by a force field and knocked unconscious. When the others search for him, they discover an abandoned town built to human scale, but soon learn it is an elaborate model created by an old man named Akman. The man wants the little people to stay and live in his miniature village, but they are tormented by his sadistic granddaughter, who attempts to kill them after they get her into trouble. Note: In this episode, the characters are revealed to be in fact on another planet, when Akman tells his granddaughter that the little people are from Earth. Guest Stars: Percy Helton (Akman), Amber Flower (Granddaughter), Raymond Guth (Tramp)
3	3	"Framed"	Harry Harris	Mann Rubin	October 6, 1968	2408
Steve and Fitzhugh attempt to steal a lens from a camera they see set down by a photographer, but then witness the man murder his photo subject – a young woman who resisted his advances. A drunken hobo enters the park and passes out on a bench, giving the killer the opportunity to plant evidence and make it look like the bum committed the crime. Steve snaps a picture of the set up, but he is then presented with the problem of somehow getting the picture developed and given to the police. Guest Stars: Paul Carr (Giant Photographer), Doodles Weaver (Giant Hobo), Linda Peck (Giant Model), Dennis Cross (Giant Policeman #1), Baynes Barron (Giant Policeman #2)
4	4	"Underground"	Sobey Martin	Ellis St. Joseph	October 20, 1968	2411
The little people witness the handover of an envelope between two men, but the recipient is shot by police and the letter confiscated. Soon, Steve receives a radio call from someone who claims to be a pilot of another Earth ship. Suspicious of the call, Steve decides to check it out, but curious Fitzhugh and Valerie follow him. All three are captured by the man who made the letter drop, who claims to be part of an underground political movement. He forces Steve and Fitzhugh to sneak the letter out of the police station and holds Valerie hostage until they comply. Guest Stars: John Abbott (Prof. Gorak), Paul Trinka (Giant Guard #1), Jim Gosa (Giant Guard #2), Jerry Catron (Giant Sentry), Lance LeGault (Giant Policeman), Ivan Markota (Giant Fugitive)
5	5	"Terror-Go-Round"	Sobey Martin	Charles Bennett	November 3, 1968	2416
Barry and Fitzhugh are captured by a gypsy boy named Pepi, who hands them to his uncle Carlos, a carnival owner, who plans to sell them to a circus. Steve leads an attempt to free the two captives by stealing the spark plugs from Carlos's truck, but events lead to everyone else being captured, as well. Carlos then tortures Mark to force Steve into handing over the stolen plugs, but Steve instead tries to reason with Pepi into freeing his friends. Guest Stars: Joseph Ruskin (Carlos), Arthur Batanides (Luigi), Jean-Michael Michenaud (Pepi), Arch Whiting (Policeman)
6	6	"The Flight Plan"	Harry Harris	Peter Packer	November 10, 1968	2410
The Earthlings find a man their size named Joe, who is being chased by giants, but Steve protests against bringing the stranger to their camp. Joe decides to leave, but is captured by the giants and Steve along with him. The two work together to escape from a cage, but Steve feels it was too easy and suspects Joe is working with the giants. To prove his loyalty, Joe claims to remember where the giants keep fuel that could power the Spindrift. The others mobilize a plan to get it, but Steve remains suspicious. Guest Stars: Linden Chiles (Joe/Logar), William Brambley (First Giant), Myron Healey (Second Giant), John Pickard (Giant Guard)
7	7	"Manhunt"	Sobey Martin	Jay Selby & Stanley H. Silverman	November 17, 1968	2407
Steve, Mark, and Fitzhugh watch as a giant convict is pursued by policeman. As the man seeks a hiding place, he stumbles upon the Spindrift, and once the coast is clear, runs off, with the ship tucked under his arm. With Dan, Betty, Valerie, and Barry still on board, the other three can only watch in horror as the convict falls into quicksand and takes the Spindrift down with him. Guest Star: John Napier (Giant Convict)
8	8	"The Trap"	Sobey Martin	S : Anthony Wilson; T : Jack Turley	November 24, 1968	2403
Mark finds a giant alarm clock and plans to use the radium from the face plate to power the Spindrift's reactor. While he dismantles the timepiece, the area is invaded by giant scientists who set up microphones sensitive enough to detect even the minute sounds the little people make. When a scientist finds Betty and Valerie and takes them prisoner, the others come up with a plan to rescue the women and disable the scientist's equipment. Guest Stars: Stewart Bradley (Senior Scientist), Morgan Jones (Assistant Scientist)
9	9	"The Creed"	Sobey Martin	S : Richard P. McDonagh; T : Bob and Esther Mitchell	December 1, 1968	2409
Barry begins to suffer severe abdominal pains, and the others learn he has appendicitis and requires surgery. Steve decides to conduct the operation himself, but he needs medical supplies from the giants' hospital. After sneaking into one, they are discovered by a surgeon, Dr Brulle, who kindly offers to help them - in accordance with his Hippocratic Oath to assist those in need. The doctor, however, is spied upon by a greedy janitor, who phones the authorities in hopes of receiving a reward. Guest Stars: Paul Fix (Dr. Brulle), Henry Corden (Janitor), Wesley Lau (Policeman #1), Harry Lauter (First Cop), Grant Sullivan (Cop #2), Gary Tigerman (Delivery Boy)
10	10	"Double-Cross"	Harry Harris	Bob and Esther Mitchell	December 8, 1968	2412
Fitzhugh is knocked unconscious and captured by two giant thieves, who take him back to their hideout. Barry keeps an eye on the criminals, who plan to take advantage of Fitzhugh's small size in their next job, stealing a priceless ruby. When the thieves go to bed, Barry gets to Fitzhugh, but finds the man has lost his memory and believes he works with the giants. Fitzhugh then forces Barry to help in the jewel heist, as the boy can fit inside the museum door's keyhole and open the lock from the inside. Guest Stars: Willard Sage (Hook), Lane Bradford (Lobo), Joy Ryan (Cabin Policeman), Howard Culver (Curator), Ted Jordan (Museum Policeman)
11	11	"The Weird World"	Harry Harris	S : Anthony Wilson; T : Ellis St. Joseph	December 22, 1968	2402
The Earthlings find a miniaturized tape recorder that leads to a crazed human astronaut named Major Kagen, who thinks they are spies for the giants. After they convince Kagen they are on his side, he informs them that his spaceship landed intact, but was taken by the giants to a research center. The Earthlings set out to break into the center and find the ship, in the hope it will be their ticket home. Note: "The Weird World" was intended to be the second episode aired; this accounts for the villainous behavior of Fitzhugh, who subsequently became a more admirable character. Guest Stars: Glenn Corbett (Major Kagen), Don Gazzaniga (Giant Watchman)
12	12	"The Golden Cage"	Sobey Martin	S : Anthony Wilson; T : Jack Turley	December 29, 1968	2405
Mark finds a beautiful human woman trapped inside a jar and becomes obsessed with saving her, but Steve feels she is an obvious trap set by the giants. Mark frees her anyway, and learns her name is Marna – the daughter of a former colleague whose spaceship disappeared 15 years earlier. Marna takes Mark to see her miniaturized home, and tries to convince him to live with her and the giants who have cared for her since childhood. Mark, though, rejects the idea of living like a laboratory rat in a doll's house, and leaves Marna heartbroken. Elsewhere, struggling with hunger, Fitzhugh tries to bag a giant turkey. Guest Stars: Celeste Yarnall (Marna Whelan), Douglas Bank (Giant Scientist), Dawson Palmer (First Scientist), Page Slattery (Second Scientist)
13	13	"The Lost Ones"	Harry Harris	Bob and Esther Mitchell	January 5, 1969	2406
Steve, Mark, Betty, and Valerie are captured by four hostile Earth teenagers, led by a violent hoodlum named Nick. The delinquents explain they are all that remains of a space flight in which 22 others lost their lives two years earlier. Nick accuses them of being spies for the giants, and blames them for the capture of two of his gang. When Nick's younger brother, Joey, is captured in a giant's animal trap, Nick threatens to harm Betty and Valerie unless Steve and the others rescue him. Guest Stars: Zalman King (Nick), Tom Webb (Dolf), Jack Chaplain (Joey), Lee J. Lambert (Hopper), Dave Dunlop (Giant Trapper)
14	14	"Brainwash"	Harry Harris	William Welch	January 12, 1969	2415
While hiding in a drain pipe, Steve and Fitzhugh find a room full of electronic equipment on a human scale, which they learn is from a lost American space flight. When Steve tries to radio Earth, the signal is intercepted by the giants, who attempt to trace the transmitter station. Steve is captured and the giants use a mind-controlling foam on him, whereupon he reveals the location of the transmitter. Mark rescues Steve, and once he recovers from the drug, they try to destroy the equipment room before the giants can dig it up. Guest Stars: Warren Stevens (Capt. Ashim), Leonard Stone (Dr. Krall), Len Lesser (Prisoner), Robert Dowdell (Policeman)
15	15	"The Bounty Hunter"	Harry Harris	S : Anthony Wilson; T : Daniel B. Ullman	January 19, 1969	2404
The Earthlings are on high alert when the giants begin combing the forest for little people – even hanging reward posters for their capture. In a desperate attempt to get the Spindrift flightworthy, Steve and Mark raid a camper's tent for anything useful. When a giant handgun is found, Mark believes he can rig it into a cannon that will defend the Spindrift camp, but Steve thinks the idea is crazy. Regardless, Mark is determined to get the weapon before the giants find them. Guest Stars: Paul Sorensen (Giant Camper), Kimberly Beck (Giant Girl)
16	16	"On a Clear Night You Can See Earth"	Sobey Martin	S : Anthony Wilson; T : Sheldon Stark	January 26, 1969	2413
Taking advantage of the fact that the giants have poor night vision, the humans sneak into a laboratory after disabling the lights, but a scientist spots them with a pair of experimental infrared goggles. Steve plans to destroy the prototype goggles before more can be made, but during the attempt, Fitzhugh and he are captured by the scientist. When Steve claims he can see Earth through the goggles, he piques the scientist's interest, then offers Mark's help in making the goggles more powerful. Fitzhugh is allowed to leave, ostensibly to fetch Mark, but actually to convey a message from Steve ordering the others to blow up the lab with him in it. Guest Star: Michael Ansara (Murtrah)
17	17	"Deadly Lodestone"	Harry Harris	William L. Stuart	February 2, 1969	2419
Inspector Kobick, an officer with the police's Special Investigations Department (SID), develops a way to track the humans using a scanner that detects a metal unique to Earth. Steve has everyone get rid of all articles containing the metal, but Dan has a surgical pin in his leg made of the unique material. Steve believes the group's only chance to evade capture is for the pin to be surgically removed, so he seeks out Dr Brulle – the giant surgeon who saved Barry's life previously – but the doctor is in prison, and the only chance to reach him lies in contacting his nurse, whose real loyalty may be to Kobick. Guest Stars: Paul Fix (Dr. Brule), Robert Emhardt (Mr. Secretary), Bill Fletcher (Sgt. Karf), Kevin Hagen (Insp. Dobbs Kobick), Sheila Allen (Nurse Helg), Gene Dynarski (Warden Barmak)
18	18	"Night of Thrombeldinbar"	Sobey Martin	Bob and Esther Mitchell	February 16, 1969	2420
Fitzhugh is captured by two orphan boys who believe he is "Thrombeldinbar" – a magical elf celebrated like the Easter Bunny, who grants wishes to children. Steve and Mark come to his rescue, but Fitzhugh realizes the boys are lonely and stays to entertain them. Their wish is to find a loving home, but tradition has it that Thrombeldinbar can only grant their wish if he is burned in a fire at moonrise. A panicked Fitzhugh faces being burned alive. He is saved for the moment by an organ grinder, who is hunting the little people for the reward now offered for them, but the demented man captures the orphans and threatens to harm them if they will not reveal where more Earthlings can be found. Note: Series regular Heather Young (Betty) does not appear in this episode. Guest Stars: Alfred Ryder (Parteg), Jay Novello (Okun), Teddy Quinn (Garna), Michael Freeman (Tobek), Miriam Schiller (Housewife)
19	19	"Seven Little Indians"	Harry Harris	Bob and Wanda Duncan	February 23, 1969	2421
Inspector Kobick returns, and this time he captures Barry's dog, Chipper. The next day, the humans learn that Chipper is being exhibited at a local zoo as the "World's Smallest Dog". Barry runs off to save his dog, and falls into Inspector Kobick's trap along with Fitzhugh and Valerie. Steve comes up with a plan to slip an animal tranquilizer to the guard, but the attempt is thwarted when Kobick is tipped off by Grotius, a dishonest handyman, who is trying to extort a reward for the capture of the Earthlings. Guest Stars: Cliff Osmond (Grotius), Kevin Hagen (Insp. Kobick), Chris Alcaide (Sgt. Arnak), Garry Walberg (First SID Man), Rico Cattani (Second SID Man), Erik L. Nelson (Third SID Man)
20	20	"Target: Earth"	Sobey Martin	Arthur Weiss	March 2, 1969	2422
Steve, Mark and Dan discover a lab where a giant scientist is working on a guidance system which could get a spacecraft to Earth. Overhearing the scientist, Dr Franzen, say he is working to peacefully explore the Solar System, Mark proposes a deal: to perfect the device in exchange for a ride back to Earth. The scientist accepts the offer, but his wife Altha secretly tips off Inspector Kobick. Guest Stars: Arthur Franz (Dr Franzen), Dee Hartford (Altha Franzen), Peter Mamakos (Logar), Kevin Hagen (Insp. Kobick), Ted Jordan (SID Man), Denver Mattson (Sergeant #1), Ivan Markota (Sergeant #2)
21	21	"Genius at Work"	Sobey Martin	Bob and Esther Mitchell	March 9, 1969	2418
Barry and Fitzhugh encounter a boy genius named Jodar, who has developed a super-growth serum. After Chipper eats it and grows to giant size, Fitzhugh tries it and grows, as well. Once giant sized, Fitzhugh goes around intimidating every giant he meets, until he is arrested by the police. When he is found with little people's money in his pocket, he is brought to Inspector Kobick. Meanwhile, Steve locates Jodar and convinces him to work on an antidote to the serum, which is not yet finalized. Pressed for time, Steve consumes the growth formula, and poses as Fitzhugh's attorney to try to get him released, but Kobick's suspicions become roused when he does not buy Steve's cover story. Guest Stars: Jacques Aubuchon (Zurpin), Kevin Hagen (Insp. Kobick), Ron Howard (credited as Ronny Howard) (Jodar), Paul Trinka (Officer), Vic Perrin (Giant Small Man), Patrick Culliton (Policeman), Rusty Jones (Boy Witness)
22	22	"Return of Inidu"	Sobey Martin	Bob and Esther Mitchell	March 16, 1969	2424
Seeking shelter from a storm, the little people enter a haunted house, but soon realize the green phantoms they see are illusions, created by a magician named Inidu, who was only trying to drive off a pair of trespassing boys. Inidu befriends the Earthlings and promises not to turn them in, for he, too, is wanted by the police. Meanwhile, the boys' tale of their ghostly encounter makes the radio news on a local station, which brings Inidu's former assistant, Enog, to the house. When Enog arrives, he tries to poison his old mentor to steal a notebook containing the secrets to the magician's tricks. Note: Series regulars Heather Young (Betty) and Stefan Arngrim (Barry) do not appear in this episode. Guest Stars: Jack Albertson (Inidu), Peter Haskell (Enog), Steven Marlo (Cop), Tony Benson (Grot), Jerry Davis (Torg)
23	23	"Rescue"	Harry Harris	Bob and Esther Mitchell	March 23, 1969	2423
While running from an SID officer, the Earthlings are spotted by two giant children, who, while chasing them, fall down a concealed well and become trapped. The giants try to dig them out, but a cave-in thwarts their efforts. After Inspector Kobick captures Steve and Dan, Valerie and Betty go to the parents of the children and offer to help them if they will convince Kobick to release their friends. After some prodding, Kobick puts duty aside and allows Steve and Dan to help in the rescue. In the meantime, Mark and Fitzhugh find another way into the well, and try to slip their friends out past Kobick. Guest Stars: Tom Reese (Sgt. Gedo), Lee Meriwether (Mrs Bara), Kevin Hagen (Insp. Kobick), Michael Quinn (Lt. Emar), Don Collier (Mr Bara), Buddy Foster (Tedar), Blair Ashley (Leeda), Roy Rowan (Newscaster)
24	24	"Sabotage"	Harry Harris	Bob and Esther Mitchell	March 30, 1969	2417
Steve rescues Mark and Dan from a ruthless interrogator named Bolgar, who believes the Earthlings pose a threat to the giant society. Steve then learns a government official named Senator Obek has sympathy for the little people and he reports Bolgar's activities. The situation becomes dire when the Earthlings learn Bolgar's accomplice has blown up a bridge and planted evidence to make it look like the little people did it. Guest Stars: Robert Colbert (Security Chief Bolgar), John Marley (Deputy Zarkin), Parley Baer (Senator Obek), Elizabeth Rogers (Secretary), Keith Taylor (Newsboy), Douglas Bank (Policeman)
25	25	"Shell Game"	Harry Harris	T : Bob and Esther Mitchell; S/T : William Welch	April 13, 1969	2425
While down at the waterfront looking for shrimp, Steve, Valerie, and Betty hide in a conch shell from a deaf boy named Dal, but he eventually finds them. His parents, facing financial problems, decide to turn the Earthlings in for the reward, and with the boy's keen eye, they follow the little people's footprints back to the Spindrift and capture the ship, as well. Mark learns that the giants' hearing aids do not work for the boy, but using the Earthlings' more advanced technology, Mark creates one that does work, and tries to convince the parents that they could sell the technology to make money instead of turning the little people over to the police. Guest Stars: Larry Ward (Talf Ekorb), Jan Shepard (Osla Ekorb), Tol Avery (Mr Derg), Gary Dubin (Dal Ekorb)
26	26	"The Chase"	Sobey Martin	T : Arthur Weiss; S/T : William Welch	April 20, 1969	2426
Betty is held captive by Inspector Kobick, who cuts a deal with Steve to locate a counterfeiting ring in exchange for her life. To find the criminals, Kobick puts the Earthlings into the city's sewer system, to follow a trail of luminous ink used in printing the fake money. The gang is tipped off, though, and tries to prevent this by flooding the drains with pesticide. Meanwhile, Dan, Valerie, and Fitzhugh slip into Kobick's office to rescue Betty, who is held within an inescapable force field. Note: Series regular Stefan Arngrim does not appear in this episode. Guest Stars: Robert F. Lyons (Nalor), Timothy Scott (Trilling), Kevin Hagen (Insp. Kobick), Norman Burton (Sergeant), Patrick Sullivan Burke (Golan), Erik L. Nelson (SID Man)

=== Season 2 (1969–70) ===
No. overall	No. in season	Title	Directed by	Written by	Original release date	Prod. code
27	1	"The Mechanical Man"	Harry Harris	William L. Stuart	September 21, 1969	4703
The Earthlings witness a giant who goes berserk, trashes a drugstore, and murders a security guard with his bare hands. They learn the man is really a malfunctioning android, created by a scientist named Gorn, who manages to capture Mark and Fitzhugh. When Gorn learns Mark is an engineer, he makes a deal with him to figure out what is wrong with his robot in exchange for his freedom. Mark gets the machine working, but when Gorn is not forthcoming with his end of the deal, Steve and the others climb inside the robot and hijack it. Guest Stars: Broderick Crawford (Prof. Gorn), Stuart Margolin (Zoral), William Chapman (Secretary Mek), James Daris (Super Giant Robot), Richard Carlyle (Special Policeman), Steven Marlo (Minor SID Official), Erik L. Nelson (SID Officer)
28	2	"Six Hours to Live"	Sobey Martin	Daniel B. Ullman	September 28, 1969	4706
The little people overhear an anxious farmer named Cass admit to committing a murder for which an innocent man named Reed is to be executed. Steve decides to help Reed, and contacts a reporter named Simmons, who is covering the execution. In exchange for the story of his career, Simmons sneaks Steve and Dan into Reed's cell and the two help him escape. Meanwhile, the other Earthlings try to delay Cass and his wife, who are trying to sneak out of town with a stash of money they stole during the crime. When Reed shows up to confront them, they think he is a ghost, and Cass confesses to the murder and theft while being secretly tape recorded. Guest Stars: Richard Anderson (Joe Simmons), Anne Seymour (Martha Cass), George Mitchell (Harry Cass), Bill Quinn (Warden Sloan), Sam Elliott (Martin Reed), Larry Pennell (Guard), Michael Quinn (Gateman), Stewart Bradley (Police Sergeant)
29	3	"The Inside Rail"	Harry Harris	Richard Shapiro	October 5, 1969	4701
While at a horseracing track, Fitzhugh finds a winning ticket on the ground and makes a deal with a giant racetrack bum named Moley, to split the winnings 50/50. Moley cashes the ticket, but a security guard becomes suspicious and arrests him. Moley leads the guard back to Fitzhugh, who manages to get away, but Mark, Valerie, and Betty are captured by a second guard, who secures them in a desk drawer. While Steve and Dan attempt to rescue the others, Fitzhugh discovers a giant thug trying to drug the favorite, Mannequin, so he will lose in the next race. Guest Stars: Ben Blue (Moley), Arch Johnson (Chief Rivers), Joe Turkel (Sergeant), Vic Tayback (Hood), John Harmon (Groom)
30	4	"Deadly Pawn"	Nathan Juran	Arthur Weiss	October 12, 1969	4709
An insane grand master named Kronig captures the little people, but proposes a deal with them – play him at chess and if they win, they go free; lose and he turns them over to the SID. The Earthlings choose Barry, their strongest player and a junior state chess champion on Earth. An enraged Kronig believes the little people are being disrespectful by having a boy oppose him, and he has the other humans tied to the chess pieces. Kronig has lied, however; the chess game is a no win-no win for in reality - if their piece is captured, they will fall through the squares of the mechanical chess table and down into a blast furnace. Dr Lalor, Kronig's therapist, protests against Kronig's cruelty, so Kronig has him locked in the closet. Steve and Dan escape from the chessboard and try to release Lalor. Meanwhile, Barry starts to lose the game, putting the lives of those still on the board in jeopardy. Note: The second theme song is introduced and is used for the remainder of the series. Guest Stars: Alex Dreier (Kronig), John Zaremba (Dr. Lalor), Charles Briggs (Guard), Steven Marlo (Technician)
31	5	"The Unsuspected"	Harry Harris	Bob and Esther Mitchell	October 19, 1969	4707
Steve is exposed to spores from a poisonous mushroom and becomes violently paranoid. Thinking the others are trying to turn him over to the SID, he lures them away one by one from the ship and ties them up inside a vent. Meanwhile, Inspector Kobick, knowing Steve has been exposed to the mushroom, expects the human to turn on his friends. He radios Steve with a deal to turn in those he captured, and he will help him get back to Earth. When Dan comes in contact with the mushroom, he experiences its hallucinatory effects and realizes Steve has been drugged. Guest Stars: Kevin Hagen (Insp. Kobick), Leonard Stone (Sgt. Eson)
32	6	"Giants and All That Jazz"	Harry Harris	Richard Shapiro	October 26, 1969	4705
Fitzhugh, Barry, and Valerie check out a music club and witness a man named Hanley rough up a down-on-his-luck trumpet player named Biff Bowers, who owes him money. Later, Bowers manages to capture Valerie and Barry, and knowing they are worth a hefty reward, he calls the SID. Unbeknown to Biff, Mark has rigged the phone and Steve intercepts the call to SID and buys the others some time, but Dan tries a different approach – make Bowers a star overnight by teaching him Earth's jazz, in exchange for letting his companions go. Guest Stars: Sugar Ray Robinson (Biff Bowers), Mike Mazurki (Loach), William Brambley (P.G. Hanley), Diana Chesney (Nell)
33	7	"Collector's Item"	Sobey Martin	S : Bob and Wanda Duncan; T : Sidney Marshall	November 2, 1969	4704
Valerie becomes the centerpiece of a golden music box, when a man named Garak captures her and puts her inside it as a dancing figurine. Garak then presents the box as a birthday gift to his wealthy toy-collecting uncle, but Steve and Mark soon learn Garak stands to inherit a fortune from his uncle, and the box is really a bomb triggered to go off if someone opens the cage door. While Dan and Fitzhugh try to rescue Valerie, Steve and Mark warn Garak's wife that her husband is trying to commit a murder. Guest Stars: Guy Stockwell (Garak), Robert H. Harris (Uncle Tojar), Susan Howard (Mrs. Garak), George Sperdakos (Goldsmith), Erik L. Nelson (SID Man)
34	8	"Every Dog Needs a Boy"	Harry Harris	Jerry Thomas	November 9, 1969	4711
Chipper is injured when the bark from a giant dog sends him tumbling into a wall, and Barry risks capture by taking him to a veterinarian at a pet store. Valerie follows and helps Barry get Chipper into the vet's office, but they are discovered by the vet's assistant Ben, who does what he can to help the tiny dog. Soon, the shop owner's bullying son Carl arrives, and learns little people are hiding there and tries to capture them. Later, Carl loses a valuable movie dog named King, and Ben goes to search for it, leaving Carl to snoop around and find Barry and Valerie's hiding spot. Note: Series regular Heather Young (Betty) does not appear in this episode. Guest Stars: Michael Anderson Jr. (Ben), Tom Nardini (Carl), Oliver McGowan (Dr. Howard), Robert Shayne (Mr. Clinton)
35	9	"Chamber of Fear"	Sobey Martin	Arthur Weiss	November 16, 1969	4702
Fitzhugh is captured by a wax sculptor named Deenar, who is partner to a jewel thief named Jolo. When Jolo orders the artist to cut up a large diamond into 10 small pieces, he refuses, believing three pieces would be worth more, and Jolo angrily ends their partnership. When Steve and Dan come to rescue Fitzhugh, they offer Deenar a deal to sneak the diamond away from Jolo in exchange for the release of their friend. Deenar agrees, but Steve sends Mark and Valerie to fetch the diamond while Dan and he try to release Fitzhugh. The rescue becomes more difficult when they learn Fitzhugh is being guarded by a fierce dog. Guest Stars: Cliff Osmond (Jolo), Christopher Cary (Deenar), Joan Freeman (Mara), Don Kennedy (Policeman), Robert Tiedemann (The Monk)
36	10	"Comeback"	Harry Harris	Richard Shapiro	November 23, 1969	4713
Steve, Mark, Valerie, and Fitzhugh talk a washed-up movie star named Egor out of committing suicide, but he repays their kindness by putting them in a shoebox and trying to sell them to a movie studio. Egor is rejected at every turn, until he visits a B-movie studio whose greedy producer, Manfred, gets an idea for a movie about living dolls. Meanwhile, Dan and Barry try to rescue the others from the set before Manfred makes them the hapless victims of gory death scenes that are not in the script. Note: Series regular Heather Young (Betty) does not appear in this episode. Guest Stars: John Carradine (Egor Crull), Jessie White (Max Manfred), Fritz Feld (Quigg), Olan Soule (Cameraman), James Jeter (Studio Gateman), Janos Prohaska (Baby Gorilla)
37	11	"The Clones"	Nathan Juran	T : Bob and Esther Mitchell; S/T : Oliver Crawford	November 30, 1969	4712
A giant scientist abducts some of the little people and begins making clones of them. After the duplicates of Valerie and Barry sabotage the ship and try to kill the others, Steve, Mark, and Dan try to rescue the originals who are being held in a lab. The near-perfect clones have a flaw, however, as they become violent and then die within hours of being created. They can also be identified by dark spots on their skin, but the scientist has a special plan for Dan when he realizes the spots are invisible on Dan's dark skin and his clone will make a better spy. Note: Series regular Heather Young (Betty) does not appear in this episode. Guest Stars: William Schallert (Dr. Arno), Sandra Giles (Dr. Greta Gault)
38	12	"A Place Called Earth"	Harmon Jones	William Welch	December 7, 1969	4708
Two humans, Olds and Fielder, travel from the year 5477 to observe Earth in the past, but they accidentally arrive on the giants' planet. They show up at the Earthlings' camp just as a giant stumbles upon the Spindrift, but the futuristic humans kill the intruder and disintegrate the body with an amulet weapon before anyone realizes what happened. Steve quickly becomes suspicious of their new guests and learns they are renegades who originally planned to kill all humans on Earth and leaving those few they captured to repopulate the future Earth with humans they can easily control. Guest Stars: Warren Stevens (Olds), Rex Holman (Mezron), Jerry Douglas (Fielder), Jerry Quarry (Bron), Scott Thomas (Messenger), Gene LaBell (Mezron's Brother), John Mooney (Pharmacist)
39	13	"Land of the Lost"	Nathan Juran, Sobey Martin	William Welch	December 14, 1969	4710
Steve, Mark, Valerie, and Barry become caught in a toy balloon and end up pulled by a strange force over a thousand miles across a violent ocean to a land ruled by a ruthless dictator named Titus. The despot, however, has no knowledge of the land across the ocean and thinks all the inhabitants are as small as the little people. When Steve explains that giants live there, as well, Titus demands he bring back proof of their existence and technology. While Titus holds the others hostage, Steve travels back to get photos of the giants and to fetch Dan and Fitzhugh, who try to sabotage Titus's attraction beam that pulled them there. Note: Series regular Heather Young (Betty) does not appear in this episode. Guest Stars: Nehemiah Persoff (Titus), Clint Ritchie (Andros), Bob Braun (Balloon Vendor), Peter Canon (Slave #1), Brian Nash (Boy in Park)
40	14	"Home Sweet Home"	Harry Harris	William Welch	December 21, 1969	4715
The humans discover a space pod left behind by the time-traveling visitors from the year 5477. While they investigate the craft, two giant park rangers appear and try to capture them. Steve and Fitzhugh manage to escape in the pod, but the ship is on a preflight course to coordinates unknown. After escaping the giants, Mark tries to decipher the pod's operation manual and help Steve navigate back. Soon, however, the pod is caught in an energy storm that takes Steve and Fitzhugh back to a small New England town on Earth, but stuck 75 years in the past. Note: This episode is also called "Return". Series regular Heather Young (Betty) does not appear in this episode. Guest Stars: John Milford (Ranger Wilson), Mort Mills (Constable), June Dayton (Mrs. Perkins), William Bassett (Ranger Jack), William "Billy" Benedict (Villager Peabody), Robert Adler (Villager Sloacum), Pete Kellett (Guard)
41	15	"Our Man O'Reilly"	Sobey Martin	Jackson Gillis	December 28, 1969	4716
A bumbling giant named O'Reilly stumbles upon the little people, but he thinks they are leprechauns and offers to serve them. Steve thinks the giant could be dangerous, but Mark believes he could be useful, so has Fitzhugh guide him along to fetch various materials and tools needed to fix the Spindrift. Meanwhile, a shady police detective named Krenko sticks his nose into O'Reilly's business and disrupts the Earthling's repair efforts. Secretly, though, Krenko plots to frame O'Reilly in a jewelry theft. Guest Stars: Alan Hale Jr. (O'Reilly), Alan Bergmann (Krenko), Billy Halop (Bartender Harry), Eddie Marr (Peddler Brynie), C. Lindsay Workman (Cunningham Jeweler), Michael Quinn (Watchman Jake), Dusty Cadis (Store Guard)
42	16	"Nightmare"	Nathan Juran	William Welch	January 4, 1970	4714
A giant engineer named Andre helps the little people develop a new power source – the "Delta Device" – which could power the Spindrift, but during a test, the Earthlings are exposed to a burst of radiation. Afterward, they realize they have become invisible to the giants when Andre's superior, Dr. Berger, comes to the Spindrift campsite, yet is not able see the humans right under his nose. As the weird effect begins to grow out of control, it creates strange warps in space and time, where the giants become invisible to the humans and Steve becomes trapped in a nightmarish dimension. Notes: This episode is also called "The Delta Effect". Series regular Heather Young (Betty) does not appear in this episode. Guest Stars: Yale Summers (Andre), Torin Thatcher (Dr. Berger), Kevin Hagen (Insp. Kobick)
43	17	"Pay the Piper"	Harry Harris	Richard Shapiro	January 11, 1970	4718
A mysterious flute player lures Dan, Valerie, Betty, and Fitzhugh into a cage with his mesmerizing music. The man claims to be not only the fabled Pied Piper of Hamelin, but also a being capable of traveling between worlds and changing his size and appearance. The Piper takes the captured humans to a giant senator, but the politician refuses to pay him for the capture. As revenge, the Piper tries to lure the senator's young son away. Mark devises a way to cancel out the Piper's music by recording the music and playing it backwards. The Piper comes up with another scheme, and reduced to the size of the humans, he offers Fitzhugh a ride back to Earth if he disables the tape recorder. Guest Stars: Jonathan Harris (Mr. Piper), Peter Leeds (Senator), Michael-James Wixted (Timmy)
44	18	"The Secret City of Limbo"	Sobey Martin	Bob and Esther Mitchell	January 18, 1970	4719
After Mark and Valerie witness two giant archeologists get attacked by a man with a laser gun, they hide in hole, where they find a teleporter that sends them to an underground city called Limbo, which is populated by giants unknown to those living on the surface. Their leader, Taru, explains that if the archeologists discover Limbo, they will start a war, which the more advanced underground giants will surely win. Taru wishes to avoid war, but his rival, General Aza, is trying to start one and had sent the gunman to kill the scientists. With the others' help, Mark comes up with a plan to contaminate the soil at the dig site with an explosive chemical that would prevent the surface giants from blasting and discovering the hidden city. Guest Stars: Malachi Throne (Taru), Whit Bissell (Dr. Krane), Joseph Ruskin (General Aza), Peter Jason (Mylo)
45	19	"Panic"	Sobey Martin	Bob and Wanda Duncan	January 25, 1970	4717
Betty and Fitzhugh are caught in a paralyzing trap and taken away by a SID officer to an interrogator named Marad. Suddenly, they are teleported away to the home of Professor Kirmus, who has developed a matter transport device capable of sending anything anywhere, including the little people back to Earth. Kirmus's housekeeper is really a SID operative, and she turns in Kirmus to the authorities, but Marad is really after the secrets of the teleport machine. Meanwhile, Steve and the other Earthlings search for a missing component of the device hidden by Kirmus, who promises them a trip back home. Note: Series regular Stefan Arngrim does not appear in this episode. Guest Stars: Jack Albertson (Prof. Kirmus), Peter Mark Richman (Dr. Marad), Diane McBain (Mrs. Evers), Edward G. Robinson Jr. (SID Guard Rogers), Patrick Culliton (SID Officer Willis), Steven Marlo (SID Officer Burns)
46	20	"The Deadly Dart"	Harry Harris	William L. Stuart	February 1, 1970	4722
Two SID agents turn up dead, killed by poison injected at the ankle. At the crime scene, the police find the footprints of little people and a blowgun with Mark's initials inscribed on it. Back at the Spindrift, the humans learn a giant reporter named Bertha Fry is spreading accusations that the Earthlings are murderers and should be exterminated. Fitzhugh openly accuses Mark of being the killer, and when more evidence mounts against him, Mark mysteriously disappears. When a giant laboratory is blown up and another giant is murdered, Steve races to locate Mark, whom he suspects is really being set up by the reporter who wants her "big story". Note: This episode is also called "The Retaliator". Guest Stars: John Dehner (Lt. Grayson), Madlyn Rhue (Bertha Fry), Christopher Dark (Sgt. Barker), Don "Red" Barry (Dr. Zoral), Kent Taylor (Doc Jelko), Willard Sage (Insp. Swan)
47	21	"Doomsday"	Harry Harris	Daniel B. Ullman	February 15, 1970	4720
The little people help a giant named Kamber, who has been shot by police, but he refuses medical help and has the humans contact a woman named Dr. North, instead. Once North arrives, Kamber and she are revealed to be part of terrorist plot to blow up half-a-million people. When she learns that the Earthlings have overheard the plan, she tries to kill them, but the humans manage to escape, with Fitzhugh injuring his leg. Betty and Valerie stay with Fitzhugh, while the others try figure out a clue left behind by Kamber that could lead to the location of the bombs. Inspector Kobick captures Betty and Fitzhugh, and does not buy their story of the terror plot, leaving Steve and the others to foil the plan themselves. Guest Stars: Kevin Hagen (Insp. Kobick), Francine York (Dr. North), Tom Drake (SID Sergeant), Charles Dierkop (Arthur Kamber), Ed Peck (Mike Warkin)
48	22	"A Small War"	Harry Harris	S : Anthony Wilson; T : Shirl Hendryx	February 22, 1970	4724
The little people encounter a giant boy named Alek, who has come to play war with another unseen opponent named Falco. Armed with several mechanical army men, and a remote-controlled jeep, tank, and airplane, Alek launches an assault upon the little people, whom he thinks are Falco's mechanical toys. For the Earthlings, at their scale, the war toys are just as lethal as the real things and must be stopped. Steve tries to reason with the boy, but is unsuccessful; after Alek "bombs" the Spindrift camp with stones from the plane, a fed-up Mark attempts to stop the child even if it means having to harm him. Guest Stars: Charles Drake (Mr. Erdap), Sean Kelly (Alek), Miriam Schiller (Nurse)
49	23	"The Marionettes"	Sobey Martin	William Welch	March 1, 1970	4725
After a gorilla escapes from a circus and captures Valerie, the little people help guide a puppeteer named Goalby in finding the beast. Although Valerie is freed from the ape, Betty becomes caught in an animal trap and Goalby helps release her, too. In doing so, he injures his hand and cannot perform. To repay him, Betty and Fitzhugh decide to be Goalby's marionettes until his hand heals. Meanwhile, Dan and Valerie are captured by Brady, the circus master; he quickly realizes Goalby's puppet show is a farce. Instead of firing the puppeteer, Brady schemes to make a fortune off the realistic puppet act and forces Goalby to maintain the illusion. Goalby, instead, tries to help Steve and Mark rescue their friends. Guest Stars: Frank Ferguson (Goalby), Victoria Vetri (Lisa), Robert Hogan (Brady), Sandra Giles (Harem Dancer), Martin Liverman (Trainer), Janos Prohaska (Bobo Gorilla), Carl Carisson (Knife Thrower), Al Lampkin (Fire Eater)
50	24	"Wild Journey"	Harry Harris	William Welch	March 8, 1970	4721
Steve and Dan encounter two time-travelling people their size, Throg and Berna, who escape an SID agent by using an amazing device called the "Space-Time Manipulator" (STM). Throg demonstrates the abilities of the STM, which can send anyone, to anywhere, to any time. Steve believes he could use the device to return to Earth and change everyone's current predicament by avoiding taking off for the fateful flight of the Spindrift. Steve manages to get a hold of the device, and Dan and he teleport back to Los Angeles spaceport on Earth just before the flight. Throg and Berna soon arrive and angrily explain that it is forbidden to change history, but Steve and Dan do not want to go back to the giant world so easily. Oddly, though the Spindrift left on their trip on June 12, 1983 in the pilot, their departure date here is September 25, 1983. Note: Series regular Stefan Arngrim (Barry) only appears in this episode via stock footage from the pilot. The storyline for this episode is lifted from the Lost In Space episode "The Time Merchant". This was the last episode filmed. Guest Stars: Bruce Dern (Thorg), Yvonne Craig (Berna), Sheila Allen (Miss Collier), Erik L. Nelson (SID Man), Louise Lorimer (Miss Smith), Marshall Stewart (Passerby)
51	25	"Graveyard of Fools"	Sobey Martin	Sidney Marshall	March 22, 1970	4723
Steve, Dan, Valerie, and Fitzhugh are caught by a mad scientist named Melzac, who puts them in a model plane and flies it to the "Graveyard of Fools" – an uncharted land on the giants' world from where no one has ever returned. During the flight, the plane enters a mysterious vortex and vanishes along with the little ones, who find themselves in a bizarre world under the control of Melzac's twin brother Bryk. Meanwhile, Mark is caught by Melzac, who reveals his brother and his plans to fix an alien device, the "servo actuator", which is causing ripples in space and time and requires the use of the little ones to get inside it and conduct repairs. Guest Stars: Albert Salmi (Melzac/Bryk), John Crawford (Tagor), Marshall Stewart (Janitor)
