= Don Marshall (actor) =

American actor (1936–2016)

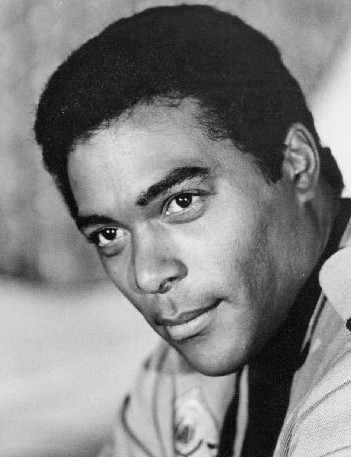
- Marshall in Land of the Giants.
- Born: Donald James Marshall; May 2, 1936; San Diego, California, U.S.
- Died: October 30, 2016 (aged 80); Los Angeles, California, U.S.
- Education: Los Angeles City College
- Occupations: Actor; Athlete; Producer
- Years active: 1962–2016
- Known for: Dan Erickson (Land of the Giants)
- Children: 2

Donald James Marshall (May 2, 1936 – October 30, 2016) was an American actor best known for his role as Dan Erickson in the television show Land of the Giants.

== Early life ==
Marshall was born on May 2, 1936, to father Ernest Overton Marshall (1910–1992) and mother Alma Louise Marshall (née Williams 1912–1993) in San Diego. He lived with his father, mother, maternal grandmother Leola Williams, his two older sisters (Leola Marceline and Ernestine), and his twin brother (Douglas). He graduated from San Diego High School in 1954.

While studying engineering between 1956 and 1957, he was encouraged to try acting by a friend, Peter Bren. Marshall was still in the army at this time, but later studied acting at the Bob Gist Dramatic Workshop, while taking a course in theatre arts at Los Angeles City College. While at college, he was a pole vaulter on the track team.

== Career ==
=== 1960s ===
Marshall's first professional role was in a 1962 Columbia Studios feature The Interns in an uncredited role. In 1964, he was in Shock Treatment, another uncredited role. Also in 1964, Marshall took the role of Chris Logan, playing opposite Nichelle Nichols in CBS Repertoire Workshop episode titled "Great Gettin' Up Mornin'", a made-for-TV-movie about an African-American family preparing their children for their first day at a racially integrated school in America's South. That same year, Nichols played Marshall's fiancée in a controversial episode of Gene Roddenberry's series The Lieutenant. In 1965, Marshall appeared in a pilot for a series Premiere in the episode "Braddock". In 1966, he appeared as recurring character Luke in Daktari.

Later in the 1960s he appeared in Roddenberry's next series, Star Trek portraying Lieutenant Boma in the episode "The Galileo Seven" (1967). Other TV series he appeared in were Tarzan (the series with Ron Ely), Dragnet 1967, and Ironside.

In 1968, he appeared as Ted Neumann, the recurring love interest of Julia Baker, in four episodes of the television series Julia, a series about an African-American widow raising her son on her own.

=== Land of the Giants ===
As a result of appearing in Premiere in the episode "Braddock", the actor met Irwin Allen, leading to Marshall gaining his role in Land of the Giants, in which he performed alongside Gary Conway, Don Matheson, Kurt Kasznar, Stefan Arngrim, Deanna Lund, and Heather Young. The series, created by Irwin Allen, featured Marshall as a competent African-American in a leading role. This was also a first for an African-American male in the 1960s to be featured so prominently in science fiction. The only other African-American actors to be in such a position in the 1960s were Nichelle Nichols, known for her role as Lt. Uhura in the TV series Star Trek, and Greg Morris as electronics expert Barney Collier in Mission: Impossible, as well as Bill Cosby in I Spy (1965 TV Series).

On set, the actors had to perform many of their own stunts, and here Marshall's athleticism was an asset; he credited his previous football, track, and pole vaulting work with enabling him to do many of the stunts required. In one of the episodes, "Ghost Town", while diving over a fire, Marshall actually dislocated his shoulder and the next day had to shoot new scenes with his arm in a sling. Another episode, "Giants and All That Jazz", which featured former world champion boxer Sugar Ray Robinson as Biff Bowers and Mike Mazurki as Loach, had Marshall teaching Biff Bowers how to play the trumpet. This episode, which Marshall called "Beautiful", seems to have been a favorite of his and made him want to act rather than follow or figure out what dialogue to use or say. He also claimed that actors had a better time on the set when Irwin Allen was not present; when he was, it was very different and people would get uptight.

In later years, Marshall wrote a script for a sequel to the series called Escape from a Giant Land. He hoped that it would be a big-screen production and would feature as many original cast members as possible.

=== 1970s ===
Marshall had a role in the made-for-TV-movie The Reluctant Heroes, or The Egghead on Hill 656 (1971), a film that was directed by Robert Day. This war film was set in the Korean War with men under a newly commissioned lieutenant who are trapped on a hill surrounded by the enemy. His character as Pvt. Carver LeMoyne was subject to continual racial abuse by Cpl. Leroy Sprague (Warren Oates). The film also starred Ken Berry, Jim Hutton, Ralph Meeker, Cameron Mitchell, and Trini Lopez.

Marshall was subsequently cast in the role of Dr. Fred Williams in the science-fiction horror exploitation film The Thing with Two Heads (1972), which starred Ray Milland and Rosey Grier. This was a tale about a wealthy and racist white man who has his head transplanted onto the body of a black prisoner from death row. In 1974, he was cast in Uptown Saturday Night as Slim's Henchman. In 1976, he played the part of Captain Colter in an episode of The Bionic Woman, and in 1979 he was in a two-part episode of Buck Rogers in the 25th Century as Julio. From 1978 to 1980, Marshall was in three episodes of The Incredible Hulk.

=== 1980–2016 ===
In the 1980s, Marshall had few roles, appearing occasionally in episodes of Little House on the Prairie as Caleb Ledoux, as Doctor Jim Blair in Finder of Lost Loves, and as Senator Ed Lawrence in Capitol. In 1992, he played the concierge in Paul Schneider's made-for-TV-movie Highway Heartbreaker. Marshall often stated that he was proud of his work on Little House. In 2011, he was in Pioneers of Television as Pvt. Ernest Cameron in archival footage from the episode titled "To Set It Right" in 1964's The Lieutenant for PBS.

After he retired from acting, Marshall set up his own company called DJM Productions, Inc., which produced television commercials and documentary films.

== Personal life and death ==
He had one daughter and one son. Marshall provided consultation on matters connected with his work and with racial issues, and received an award for "Outstanding Achievement in his field as a Black Achiever in the United States". He died on October 30, 2016, at Cedars-Sinai Medical Center in Los Angeles, at the age of 80. Veteran actress BarBara Luna had reported his death on Facebook.

== Filmography ==
=== Film ===
Year	Title	Role	Notes
1962	The Interns	Intern	Drama film directed by David Swift.; Uncredited
1964	Shock Treatment	Singer	Drama film directed by Denis Sanders.; Uncredited
1968	Sergeant Ryker	Corporal Jenks	Drama–war film directed by Buzz Kulik.; Archival footage from 1963's Kraft Suspense Theatre first 2 episodes.
1972	The Thing with Two Heads	Dr. Fred Williams	Science fiction film directed by Lee Frost.
1973	Terminal Island	A. J. Thomas	Action–drama thriller film directed by Stephanie Rothman.
1974	Uptown Saturday Night	Slim's Henchman #2	Action–comedy crime film directed by Sir Sidney Poitier.
1975	Hugo the Hippo		Animated film directed by William Feigenbaum and József Gémes.; Also known as in Hungarian: Hugó, a víziló; Voice

=== Television ===
Year	Title	Role	Notes
1963	Kraft Suspense Theatre	Corporal Jenks	Episodes: "The Case Against Paul Ryker: Part 1" (S 1:Ep 1–Pilot); "The Case Against Paul Ryker: Part 2" (S 1:Ep 2)
1963	The Alfred Hitchcock Hour	Tom Jackson	Season 2 Episode 8: "The Cadaver"
1964	CBS Repertoire Workshop	Chris Logan	Episode: "Great Gettin' Up Mornin'" (S 1:Ep 1–Pilot)
1964	The Lieutenant	Private Ernest Cameron	Episode: "To Set It Right" (S 1:Ep 21)
1964	Rawhide	Private Goodlove	Episode: "Incident at Seven Fingers" (S 6:Ep 30)
1964	The Alfred Hitchcock Hour	Officer Healy	Season 2 Episode 31: "Isabel"
1964	Bob Hope Presents the Chrysler Theatre	Guest	Episode: "The Turncoat" (S 2:Ep 4)
1965	The Rogues	Chalo	Episode: "The Diamond-Studded Pie" (S 1:Ep 20)
1965	The Alfred Hitchcock Hour	Joe Chandler	Season 3 Episode 28: "Night Fever"
1965	Bob Hope Presents the Chrysler Theatre	Lathrop	Episode: "The War and Eric Kurtz" (S 2:Ep 17)
1965	Ben Casey	Charles Stearns	Episode: "A Nightingale Named Nathan" (S 5:Ep 3)
1965	Bob Hope Presents the Chrysler Theatre	Jerry Benton	Episode: "The Admiral" (S 3:Ep 9)
1966	Daktari	Luke	Recurring
1966	Mission: Impossible	The Police Officer	Episode: "The Ransom (S 1:Ep 8)
1966	Twelve O'Clock High	Sergeant Earl Conklin	Episode: "Graveyard" (S 3:Ep 15)
1967	Star Trek	Lieutenant Boma	Episode: "The Galileo Seven" (S 1:Ep 16)
1967	Mr. Terrific	Athlete	Episode: "Stanley the Track Star" (S 1:Ep 14)
1967	Tarzan	Kimini	Episode: "The Fanatics" (S 2: Ep 7)
1967	Ironside	Joe Masterson	Episode: "Let My Brother Go"
1967	Dragnet	Dave Roberts	Episode: "The Shooting" (S 1:Ep 11)
1968	Premiere	Gilmore	Episode: "Braddock" (S 1:Ep 4)
1968	Dragnet	Officer Dave Evans	Episode: "Community Relations (DR-10)" (S 3:Ep 3)
1968–1970	Julia	Ted Neumann	Recurring
1968–1970	Land of the Giants	Dan Erickson	Main role, 51 episodes
1970	Bewitched	Keith Wilson	Episode: "Sisters at Heart" (S 7:Ep 13)
1971	The Reluctant Heroes	Private Carver LeMoyne	Made-for-TV-Movie and war film directed by Robert Day.
1974	Police Story	Chuck	Episode: "World Full of Hurt" (S 2:Ep 5); Uncredited
1975	Police Story	Justin Sullivan	Episode: "The Execution" (S 2:Ep 18)
1976	Good Times	FBI Agent Lloyd	Episode: "The Investigation" (S 3:Ep 20)
1976	The Bionic Woman	Captain Colter	Episode: "The Vega Influence" (S 2"Ep 9)
1976	Rich Man, Poor Man Book II	Reverend	Miniseries; Episode: "Chapter XII" (S 1:Ep 12) directed by Ted Post.
1977	Benny and Barney: Las Vegas Undercover	Detective Vincent	Made-for-TV-Movie directed by Ron Satlof.
1977	The Hardy Boys/Nancy Drew Mysteries	Flight Engineer Eddy Baker	Episode: "The Strange Fate of Flight 608" (S 2: Ep 8)
1978	The Incredible Hulk	Lee	Episode: "The Hulk Breaks Las Vegas" (S 1:Ep 8)
1978	Rescue from Gilligan's Island	FBI Man #1	Made-for-TV-Movie directed by Leslie H. Martinson.
1979	The Suicide's Wife	Richard Wilkes	Made-for-TV-Movie directed by John Newland.
1979	The Incredible Hulk	Doctor	Episodes: "Mystery Man, part 1" (S 2:Ep 15); "Mystery Man, part 2" (S 2: Ep 16)
1979	Buck Rogers in the 25th Century	Julio	Episodes: "Planet of the Slave Girls, part 1" (S 1:Ep 3); "Planet of the Slave Girls, part 2" (S 1:Ep 4)
1980	The Incredible Hulk	Willy	Episode: "Deathmask" (S 3:Ep 20)
1981	Little House on the Prairie	Caleb Ledoux	Episode: "Dark Sage" (S 8:Ep 4)
1984	Capitol	Senator Ed Lawrence #1	Recurring
1984	Finder of Lost Loves	Doctor Jim Blair	Episode: "Forgotten Melodies" (S 1:Ep 10)
1992	Highway Heartbreaker	Concierge	Made-for-TV-Movie directed by Paul Schneider.: (final film role)
2011	Pioneers of Television	Private Ernest Cameron	Archival footage from the episode titled "To Set It Right" in 1964's The Lieutenant.
