= Heather Young =

Heather Young may refer to:

- Heather Young (actress) (born 1945), American television actress
- Heather Rae El Moussa (born 1987), American model and television actress
- Heather Bowie Young (born 1975), American golfer
- Heather Young (filmmaker), Canadian filmmaker
- Heather Armitage (born 1933), British sprinter formerly known as Heather Young
