= Norma MacMillan =

Canadian actress (1921–2001)

- MacMillan with Casper
- Born: September 15, 1921; Vancouver, British Columbia, Canada
- Died: March 16, 2001 (aged 79); Vancouver, British Columbia, Canada
- Resting place: Remains scattered off Strait of Juan de Fuca
- Occupation: Actress
- Years active: 1954–2001
- Spouse: Thor Arngrim (m. 1954)
- Children: Stefan Arngrim; Alison Arngrim

Norma MacMillan (September 15, 1921 – March 16, 2001) was a Canadian actress, best known for voicing numerous characters in animation and claymation, including Casper the Friendly Ghost on The New Casper Cartoon Show, Gumby on The Gumby Show, Sweet Polly Purebred on Underdog, and Davey on Davey and Goliath.

== Early life ==
MacMillan was born on September 15, 1921, in Vancouver, British Columbia, Canada, and began her career there as a stage actress. It was in Vancouver that she met, worked with her then husband Thor Arngrim. In 1954, MacMillan, her husband and his business partner Stuart Baker, set out for Toronto where she began landing work voicing children's roles for the Canadian Broadcasting Corporation.

== Career ==
After her husband and she moved to New York, MacMillan lent her voice talents to numerous roles; as "Casper the Friendly Ghost" on The New Casper Cartoon Show, as "Gumby" on The Gumby Show, as "Sweet Polly Purebred" in the Underdog cartoons, and as "Davey" on Seasons 4-5 of the claymation series Davey and Goliath among others. In addition to these roles, MacMillan also voiced the roles of John-John and Caroline Kennedy in the world record setting The First Family album of 1962. In 1991, she provided narration for Saban Entertainment's comedic "Sugar & Spice" subset of Funky Fables cartoons, which included The Ugly Duckling, Thumbelina, Heidi, Alice in Wonderland, The Wizard of Oz, Snow White and the Seven Dwarfs, Cinderella, and The Secret Garden.

In addition to her voice roles, MacMillan also appeared as an on-screen actress in various television and films roles. Her on-screen work included guest-starring roles on such television shows as Columbo, She's the Sheriff, Webster and Thirtysomething. During this time, she also appeared in feature films, including Nightmare on the 13th Floor, Big Business, Love at Stake, Dangerous Intentions, Big Bully, and Mrs. Delafield Wants to Marry with Katharine Hepburn.

MacMillan appeared in numerous television commercials, but perhaps her most visible acting role was the part she played in the 1980s as the sweet, demure, naive "Aunt Martha" opposite Ruth Manning's "Aunt Harriet" for Kraft Foods mayonnaise commercials. Upon returning to Vancouver with her husband in the mid-1990s, MacMillan joined the Co-Op Radio's Sunday show for senior citizens and was a board member of the local 411 Seniors Centre.

While in Canada, MacMillan went on to voice characters in a number of later animated series and films such as Funky Fables, Fat Dog Mendoza, Madeline, Generation O!, Milo's Bug Quest and The Animated Adventures of Tom Sawyer.

== Personal life ==
MacMillan and her husband producer/manager Thor Arngrim, were married in 1954, together they have two children, including Stefan Arngrim (born December 23, 1955), who played Barry Lockridge on Land of the Giants, and Alison Arngrim (born January 18, 1962), who played Nellie Oleson on Little House on the Prairie. MacMillan and her husband Thor returned to Canada in 1993.

== Death ==
MacMillan died on March 16, 2001, at the age of 79, in Vancouver, British Columbia.
