= Alison Arngrim =

American actress and author (born 1962)

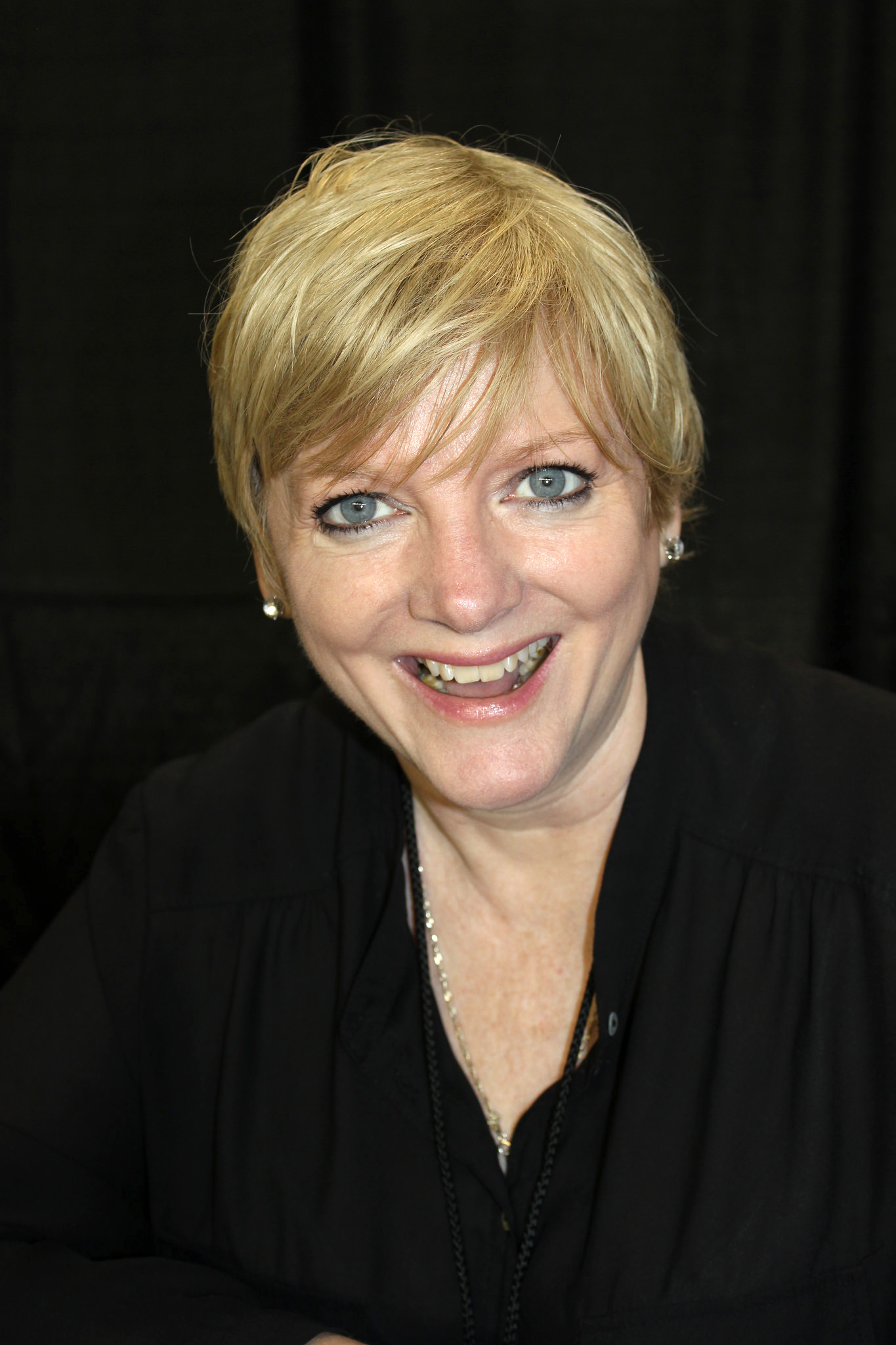
- Arngrim in 2017
- Born: Alison Margaret Arngrim; January 18, 1962 (age 64); New York City, U.S.
- Occupations: Actress, author
- Years active: 1974–present
- Spouses: Donald Spencer; Robert Paul Schoonover
- Mother: Norma MacMillan
- Relatives: Stefan Arngrim (brother)
- Website: www.alison-arngrim.com

Alison Margaret Arngrim (born January 18, 1962) is an American-Canadian actress and author. Beginning her television career at the age of 12, Arngrim is a Young Artist Award–Young Artist Former Child Star Lifetime Achievement Award honoree, best known for her portrayal of Nellie Oleson on the NBC television series Little House on the Prairie from 1974 to 1982.

== Early life ==
Arngrim's father, Thor Arngrim, was a Canadian-born Hollywood manager. Her mother, Norma MacMillan of Vancouver, British Columbia, was an actress who provided the voices for the characters: Casper on Casper the Friendly Ghost, Gumby on Gumby, Davey on Davey and Goliath, Sweet Polly Purebred on Underdog, and other animated children's programs.

Her brother Stefan (b. 1955) was also a child actor, perhaps best known for his role as Barry Lockridge on the Irwin Allen science-fiction television series, Land of the Giants. The Arngrim's grew up in Briarwood, Queens.

Arngrim claimed that her brother sexually molested her from age 6 until 9, when he was between the ages of 13 and 16. She also claimed that her brother admitted to the abuse but is not particularly apologetic for his behavior. Arngrim stated that she no longer has any kind of relationship with her brother, a decision she reports has bettered her life.

== Acting career ==
After beginning a career as a child model and actress in television commercials, Arngrim rose to fame as a child star in 1974, portraying Nellie Oleson in the NBC television series Little House on the Prairie. She originally auditioned for the part of Laura Ingalls, and later Mary Ingalls, but was instead cast in the role of antagonist Nellie Oleson. Arngrim played her for seven seasons, and her portrayal became a cultural reference and camp archetype for the spoiled "bad girl" throughout the 1970s.

Years later in one of her stand-up routines, Arngrim described playing Nellie on Little House on The Prairie as "like having PMS for seven years." In 2002, she was honored by the Young Artist Foundation with its Young Artist Former Child Star Lifetime Achievement Award for her work as a child actress on Little House. At the 2006 TV Land Awards Arngrim tied with Danielle Spencer (Dee on What's Happening!!) as the "Character Most in Need of a Time-Out" for her role as Nellie.

In addition to her work on Little House, Arngrim also recorded the 1977 comedy record album Heeere's Amy on Laff Records, where she impersonates President Jimmy Carter's daughter Amy. Her mother, who voiced the Kennedy children on the comedy albums of Vaughn Meader, also guest-starred on the album. After leaving Little House, Arngrim appeared in guest-starring roles on such television series as The Love Boat and Fantasy Island. She was also a frequent panelist on the short-lived NBC game show Match Game–Hollywood Squares Hour.

Starting in 2006, she developed a successful career on stage in France with her friend, author/director/comedian Patrick Loubatière. In 2017 in Pinehurst, North Carolina, she appeared as Emily Brent in Judson Theatre Company's production of Agatha Christie's And Then There Were None.

== Philanthropy ==
In addition to performing, Arngrim also devotes her time to charitable organizations.

One of her inspirations for her charity work is the memory of friend and fellow actor Steve Tracy, who played Nellie Oleson's husband, Percival Dalton, on Little House on the Prairie. Tracy died in 1986 of complications from AIDS. Tracy's death inspired Arngrim to become an activist for AIDS awareness. She worked for an AIDS hotline and with the advocacy group ACT UP.

Arngrim is also an advocate for several other issues. She has been a frequent speaker for PROTECT, a group that works to fight child abuse. In 2004 Arngrim revealed on Larry King Live that she herself was an incest survivor.

== Author ==
In 2010, Arngrim authored an autobiography titled Confessions of a Prairie Bitch: How I Survived Nellie Oleson and Learned to Love Being Hated. In the book for the first time, she publicly identified her then-teenaged brother as her childhood abuser, though the book is mostly light-hearted and received critical praise for her ability to mix humor and personal tragedy. She wrote and performed a stage version, which premiered at Club Fez in New York City. She later performed this one-person show at Parliament House, a gay resort in Orlando, Florida.

== Filmography ==
Year	Title	Role	Notes
1974	Throw Out the Anchor!	Stevie	Feature film
1974–1982	Little House on the Prairie	Nellie Oleson	Main role
1981	The Love Boat	Becky Daniels	Episode: "Tony and Julie/Separate Beds/America's Sweetheart"
1981	Fantasy Island	Lisa Blake	Episode: "Elizabeth's Baby/The Artist and the Lady"
1983	I Married Wyatt Earp	Amy	TV film
1986	Video Valentino	Trixie	Short film
2000	For the Love of May	Jude	Short film
2002	The Last Place on Earth	Party Toast	Feature film
2007	Le deal	Edith	Feature film
2009	Make the Yuletide Gay	Heather Mancuso	Feature film
2009	The Bilderberg Club: Meet the Shadow One World Government	Dr. Samantha Klein	Short film
2012	Livin' the Dream	Debbie Sweat	Short film
2015	The Comeback Kids	Herself	Episode: "Child Star Support Group: Part 2"
2015	CPR Talent Agency	Herself	Pilot
2015	Life Interrupted	Ally Hughes	TV film
2017	The Mephisto Box	Leeza	Feature film
2021	Even in Dreams	Debra	Feature film
2026	Little House on the Prairie	Ida	Episode: “The House on the Prairie”

== Awards ==
=== Wins ===
- 2002 – Young Artist Award: Young Artist Former Child Star Lifetime Achievement Award for Little House on the Prairie
- 2006 – TV Land Award: for "Character Most Desperately in Need of a Time-Out" (Little House on the Prairie)

=== Nominations ===
- 1981 – Young Artist Award: for Best Young Comedienne (Little House on the Prairie)
- 2008 – TV Land Award: for "Siblings That Make You Grateful for Your Own Crazy Family" (Little House on the Prairie)

== Bibliography ==
- Arngrim, Alison (2010). Confessions of a Prairie Bitch: How I Survived Nellie Oleson and Learned to Love Being Hated. New York City: It Books. ISBN 978-0-06-196214-1.
