= Michele Matheson =

American actress, novelist (born 1971)

- Born: August 14, 1971 (age 54); Los Angeles County, California, U.S.
- Parents: Don Matheson (father); Deanna Lund (mother)

Michele Matheson (born August 14, 1971) is an American former actress and novelist. She authored the 2006 semi-autobiographical novel Saving Angelfish, and her last role was in a 2017 video short.

== Early life ==
Matheson is the daughter of actors Don Matheson and Deanna Lund. Her parents met while performing together in the Irwin Allen science fiction series Land of the Giants (1968–1970) and married soon after the show was cancelled. Michele has two half-siblings (an older brother, Randy, and sister, Kim). She attended Marymount High School in Los Angeles.

== Career ==
Matheson began her career on the television shows Life Goes On and Mr. Belvedere before starring in the direct-to-video movie Howling VI: The Freaks (1991) and appearing in Threesome (1994). In 2002 she co-starred in the Academy Award nominated short film Johnny Flynton. She is also a singer/keyboardist and has recorded with a band, The Black Tales. In 2006, Tin House Books published Saving Angelfish, a story loosely based on her life.

== Filmography ==
=== Film ===
| Year | Title | Role | Notes |
|---|---|---|---|
| 1991 | Howling VI: The Freaks | Elizabeth | Direct-to-video |
| 1992 | Little Sister | Sybil | Direct-to-video |
| 1994 | Threesome | Kristen | |
| 1994 | Test Tube Teens from the Year 2000 | Maggie | Direct-to-video |
| 1996 | Kingpin | Rebecca | |
| 2005 | Hitters Anonymous | Leah | |
| 2009 | Eugene | Donna | |
| 2017 | Girl Scout Moms | Prospective Girl Scout mom | Video short |

=== Television ===
| Year | Title | Role | Notes |
|---|---|---|---|
| 1985–1990 | Mr. Belvedere | Angela | Guest (season 1); recurring role (seasons 2–6) |
| 1989–1991 | Life Goes On | Rona | Recurring role (seasons 1–2) |
| 1991 | Step by Step | Mandy | Episode: "The New Car" |
| 1992 | Revenge of the Nerds III: The Next Generation | Claudette | TV movie |
| 1998 | The Army Show | Debbie | Episode: "Area 52" |
| 1998 | Melrose Place | Tiffany | Episode: "Suspicion" |
| 2003 | 8 Simple Rules | Receptionist | Episode: "What Dad Would Want" |
