= Elves (film) =

1989 American horror film

- VHS artwork
- Directed by: Jeffrey Mandel
- Written by: Jeffrey Mandel
- Produced by: Mark Paglia
- Starring: Dan Haggerty; Deanna Lund; Ken Carpenter
- Cinematography: Kenny Carmack
- Edited by: Tom Matthies
- Music by: Vladimir Horunzhy
- Production company: Action International Pictures
- Distributed by: Action International Pictures; AIP Home Video
- Release date: October 24, 1989
- Running time: 89 minutes
- Country: United States
- Language: English

Elves is a 1989 American Christmas horror film directed by Jeffrey Mandel and starring Dan Haggerty, Deanna Lund, and Ken Carpenter.

== Plot ==
When teenager Kirsten accidentally cuts her hand during an "Anti-Christmas" pagan ritual with her friends Brooke and Amy in the woods, her spilled blood awakens an ancient demonic Christmas elf. The elf is the central figure in a modern-day Neo-Nazi plot to finally bring about the master race with which Hitler had always dreamed of conquering the world. Rather than a race of pure-blood Aryans, it is revealed that Hitler instead dreamed of a race of half-human/half-elf hybrids; it is also revealed that elves figured heavily into a pseudo-cult religion that the Nazis practiced in secret. Kirsten is also a figure in this plot, as she is the last remaining pure-blooded Aryan virgin in the world, her grandfather being a former Nazi who was once involved in the plot, but is now reformed; he is also her father, as inbreeding was somehow considered crucial to maintaining a pure Aryan bloodline. Unaware of all these sinister goings-on, the non-festive Kirsten continues to sulk her way through the Christmas season as she works at the snack counter of a local department store.

Mike McGavin is an ex-cop who lost his badge when he lost control of his alcoholism. Jobless, penniless, and recently served a notice of eviction from his ramshackle trailer home, Mike turns to his old friend — the manager of the department store — for help, and winds up becoming the store Santa after the prior Santa is murdered by the elf. Without a proper home, Mike sneaks into the store at night to sleep in the storage room and live off the snack counter left-overs. One night, he hears Kirsten and her friends, who have also sneaked in, frolicking through the store as they wait for their boyfriends to show up for an all-night party. The shadowy Nazi group arrives instead, planning to kidnap Kirsten and find the elf so the master race can finally be made reality. With Mike's help, Kirsten escapes with her life, though her friends are not so lucky. Promptly fired for breaking into the store after hours, Mike and Kirsten are able to devote their time to unraveling the plot. After making a Christmas Eve visit to the local college library and later breaking into a professor's home to demand information, Mike realizes what is afoot and sets out to protect Kirsten. Mike, Kirsten and her grandfather have a final climactic showdown with the Nazis and the elf in Kirsten's home, culminating in the woods where Kirsten destroys the elf by performing a ritual involving an "elfstone" from her grandfather's study. The following morning, Kirsten huddles in the now inexplicably destroyed forest as it begins to snow for the first time that winter. The film ends on the image of a fetus, suggesting perhaps that the plot was successful despite the elf's seeming inability to actually copulate with Kirsten before its demise.

== Cast ==
- Dan Haggerty as Mike McGavin
- Julie Austin as Kirsten
- Deanna Lund as Kirsten's mother
- Borah Silver as Kirsten's grandfather
- Mansell Rivers-Bland as Rubinkraur
- Christopher Graham as Willy
- Laura Lichstein as Brooke
- Stacey Dye as Amy
- Winter Monk as Kurt
- Jeff Austin as Emil
- Allen Lee as Dr. Fitzgerald
- Paul Rohrer as Prof. O'Conner
- Ken Carpenter as Shaver
- Michael Tatlock as Hugh Reed
- Michael Herst as Sgt. DeSoto
- Chris Hamner as Kevin
- D.L. Walker as Dave
- James Albert as Mark

== Release ==
It premiered in a limited theatrical release in 1989, and it was given a PG-13 rating. It was released on VHS on December 19, 1994 by AIP Home Video and Hemdale Home Video. As of 2026, the film is still yet to have a DVD or Blu-ray release.

== Reception ==
Ryne Barber from HorrorNews.net wrote in his review of the film, "It’s hard to dread seeing the elf if it’s not even potentially frightening. Most of the time, you’ll be laughing at how ridiculous the death scenes are to even think about being scared. It might seem that because the film is so bad it’s funny, it would be worth a watch. It’s not — the plot ambles along so slowly, so pointlessly, that Elves is only recommended for those hardcore viewers who completely love bad movies for whatever reason. Anyone else will see no point to this somnolent movie, especially because of the confusing ending". Charles Tatum from DVD Talk awarded the film 1/5 stars, writing, "One real drawback is the fact that this film is very ugly. It is mean. It is not scary, and not fun in a scary way. It is just plain mean." Brett Gallman from Oh, the Horror! criticized the film's absurd plot, and dialogue, calling it "completely harmless". Jeremy Wheeler from AllMovie wrote, "No holiday horror viewing would be complete without a little screening of the horrendously strange low-budget opus Elves... this old VHS gem delivers the ridiculous goods hand over fist time and again."
