= Premiere (TV series) =

1968 television series

- Genre: Anthology series
- Country of origin: United States
- Original language: English

Production
- Running time: 60 minutes

Original release
- Network: CBS
- Release: July 1 – September 9, 1968

Premiere is an American anthology television series that aired on CBS during the summer of 1968. It consisted of unsold television pilots.

== Background ==
The practice of television executives of ordering dozens of pilots for proposed television series each year – far more than their networks could possibly broadcast as series – created a sizable body of unsold pilots that had never aired. Packaging these unsold pilots in anthology series and airing them during the summer provided television networks with a way of both providing fresh programming during the summer rerun season and recouping at least some of the expense of producing them. Premiere was one of these series, aired by CBS in the summer of 1968.

== Content ==
Premiere aired hour-long dramas in six of its episodes; among them was "Call to Danger," which was made years earlier as the pilot for the 1966–1973 series Mission: Impossible. One episode consisted of two situation comedies broadcast back-to-back. Stars appearing in Premiere include Alan Alda, Peter Graves, Dustin Hoffman, Shirley Jones, and Burt Reynolds.

== Broadcast history ==
Premiere aired from 10:00 to 11:00 p.m. Eastern Time on Mondays, premiering on July 1, 1968. Its first five episodes ran during July, followed by one episode in August and one — its final episode — broadcast on September 9, 1968.

== Episodes ==
No.	Title	Directed by	Written by	Original release date
1	"Call to Danger"	Lamont Johnson	David P. Harmon	July 1, 1968
The head of the Office of Natural Resources, a United States Government agency that takes on complex security cases and threats, joins one of his special agents in investigating the theft of the plates used to print the U.S. $10.00 bill. Starring Peter Graves, James Gregory, Henry Allin, Laurel Goodwin, Forrest Lewis, Albert Paulsen, William Smithers, Dan Travanty, and Brad Trumbull. Filmed years earlier, this episode was reworked to create the series Mission: Impossible of 1966–1973.
2	"Lassiter"	Sam Wanamaker	Richard Alan Simmons	July 8, 1968
A magazine journalist who goes undercover for his stories works on an expose about vice. Starring Burt Reynolds, Lane Bradford, Nicholas Colasanto, Sharon Farrell, Laurence Haddon, Lloyd Haynes, James MacArthur, Cameron Mitchell, Jeff Morris, Gerald S. O'Loughlin, and Stanley Waxman. Made by Filmways and created and produced by Richard Alan Simmons. Filmed in Reno, Nevada, in 1966.
3	"Walk in the Sky"	Robert Altman	Robert Altman, Robert Eggenweiler, & Brian McKay	July 15, 1968
After a Swedish sailor jumps ship in Chicago, Illinois, carrying a suitcase he thinks contains a cradle but actually holds a time bomb intended to destroy his ship, a special team of investigators sets out to find him. Starring Andrew Duggan, Carroll O'Connor, Michael Murphy, Gunnar Helstrom, Jacqueline Betton, Jim Lantz, Ron Masak, Albert Paulsen, Karl Swenson, and Linda Wallenberg.
4	"Braddock"	Walter Doniger	Paul Monash	July 22, 1968
In the near future, a private investigator who uses the latest technology in his work searches for a missing component to a laser. Starring Tom Simcox, Stephen McNally, Karen Steele, Lloyd Bochner, Kathy Kersh, Tom Reese, John Doucette, Colette Jackson, Arthur Adams, Don Marshall, Laura Lindsay, Robert Sampson, and Charles Macaulay.
5	"The Search"	Unknown	Unknown	July 29, 1968
A detective from the United States works in London. Starring Mark Miller, Barry Foster, and Michael Rennie.
6	"Out of the Blue"	Sherman Marks	Sol Saks	August 12, 1968
6	"Operation Greasepaint"	Bud Yorkin	Johnny Wayne & Frank Shuster	August 12, 1968
The only episode of Premiere featuring 30-minute situation comedies rather than a 60-minute drama. In "Out of the Blue," airing at 10:00, aliens from an overcrowded planet looking for another world to colonize travel to Earth to observe its culture and meet a friendly physics professor who tries to explain what they view as strange human customs to them. Starring Shirley Jones, John McMartin, Carl Ballantine, Marvin Kaplan, Barry Dennen, Richard Erdman, Nydia Westman, Richard Jury, John Hubbard, and Rick Richards. In "Operation Greasepaint," airing at 10:30, two entertainers are drafted into the United States Army during World War II and are assigned to serve in the infantry in France, where they create chaos. Starring Avery Schreiber, Jack Burns, Fred Willard, Johnny Haymer, Robert Fitch, Rex Allen, Jr., Ben Astar, Roger Newman, Karl Sadler, Bill Giorgio, Chuck Privney, Bob Kaliban, Sam Capuano, and Arthur Abelson.
7	"Higher and Higher, Attorneys at Law"	Paul Bogart	Irving Gaynor Neiman	September 9, 1968
A husband-and-wife team of lawyers defend a young man accused of murdering a wealthy woman. Starring Dustin Hoffman, Sally Kellerman John McMartin, Barry Morse, Marie Masters, Alan Alda, Gunilla Knudsen, Robert Forster, Eugene Roche, George Wallace, Ruth White, and Billy Dee Williams.
