= The Reluctant Heroes =

- Written by: Ernie Frankel; Herman Hoffman
- Screenplay by: Herman Hoffman
- Directed by: Robert Day
- Starring: Ken Berry; Jim Hutton; Trini López; Don Marshall; Ralph Meeker; Cameron Mitchell; Warren Oates
- Music by: Frank De Vol
- Country of origin: United States
- Original language: English

Production
- Executive producer: Aaron Spelling
- Producer: Robert Mirisch
- Cinematography: Archie R. Dalzell
- Editor: Art Seid
- Running time: 73 min
- Production company: Aaron Spelling Productions

Original release
- Network: ABC
- Release: November 23, 1971

The Reluctant Heroes is a made-for-TV movie and war film set in the period of the Korean War. It was directed by Robert Day and starred Ken Berry, Jim Hutton, Trini López, Don Marshall, Ralph Meeker, Cameron Mitchell and Warren Oates. The film was originally aired as an ABC Movie of the Week on November 23, 1971.

== Plot ==
A tired platoon is about to be sent home, but is picked to hold an observation point. They are led by the inexperienced Lt. Parnell Murphy (Ken Berry), who is a military historian with no combat experience. In order to defend Hill 656, which has strategic importance, he uses military tactics of Napoleon and Alexander the Great, which he draws from his own studies in history.

== Cast ==
- Lt. Parnell Murphy ... Ken Berry
- Cpl. Bill Lukens ... Jim Hutton
- Pvt. Sam Rivera ... Trini López
- Pvt. Carver LeMoyne ... Don Marshall
- Capt. Luke Danvers ... Ralph Meeker
- Sgt. Marion Bryce ... Cameron Mitchell
- Cpl. Leroy Sprague ... Warren Oates
- Pvt. Golden ... Richard Young
- Cpl. Bates ... Michael St. George
- Korean Officer ... Soon-Tek Oh

== Production ==
The original title of the film was The Egghead on Hill 656 and was based on an original script by Herman Hoffman. Robert Mirsch signed to produce in February 1971.

It was filmed on a Paramount Studios back lot.

One of the issues addressed in the film is racism. Even though the film was lacking in some areas, its emphasis was correct on the strategic importance of bridges.

== Release ==
The Los Angeles Times said "there is nothing new in the movie" but it "has its entertaining moments mostly because the players on the screen are so easy to watch."

== Bibliography ==
- Lentz, Robert J. (2003). Korean War Filmography. Jefferson, North Carolina: McFarland & Company. ISBN 978-0-7864-1046-0. OCLC 50630520.
