= The Suicide's Wife =

American television film directed by John Newland

- Genre: Drama
- Based on: The Suicide's Wife by David Madden
- Screenplay by: Dennis Nemec
- Directed by: John Newland
- Starring: Angie Dickinson; Gordon Pinsent; Zohra Lampert; Todd Lookinland; Peter Donat; Lane Davies; Don Marshall; Majel Barrett
- Music by: David Raksin
- Country of origin: United States
- Original language: English

Production
- Producers: Alan Jay Factor; Dennis Nemec; Dann Cahn
- Cinematography: Michael D. Margulies
- Editor: Dann Cahn
- Running time: 96 mins
- Production company: Factor/Newland Productions

Original release
- Network: CBS
- Release: November 7, 1979

The Suicide's Wife is a 1979 made-for-TV movie and drama film directed by John Newland. The film stars Angie Dickinson, Gordon Pinsent, Zohra Lampert, Todd Lookinland, Peter Donat, Lane Davies, Don Marshall, and Majel Barrett. Kathie Browne has a supporting role. The film is based on the novel of the same name by David Madden.

== Plot ==
An unsuccessful middle-aged college professor commits suicide, leaving his wife to cope with guilt, shame, and an angry teenage son who blames her for his father's death.

== Cast ==
- Angie Dickinson as Diana Harrington
- Gordon Pinsent as Allan Crane
- Zohra Lampert as Sharon Logan
- Todd Lookinland as Mark Harrington
- Peter Donat as Wayne Harrington
- Lane Davies as Anson Keller
- Don Marshall as Richard Wilkes
- Majel Barrett as Clarissa Harmon
- Walt Davis as Jerry Swider
- Martin Rudy as William McGuane
- Luana Anders as Ms. Robbin
- Elaine Princi as Dorothy
- Mario Machado as Doctor
- Lorna Thayer as Therese Harrington
- Denis Berkfeldt as Bob
- Kathie Browne as Joan Davies
- Chris Ellis as Truck Driver
- Lyla Graham as Female Shopper
- Susan Niven as Secretary
- Peter Skinner as Brubaker
- Sean Spencer as Driver's Assistant
- Steven Factor as Jason Logan
- Marilyn Staley as Bank Teller
- Hillary Farrell as Teaching Assistant
- Matthew Baer as Kramer
- Alan Frost as Mr. Sloan

== Production ==
Factor/Newland Productions produced the film.

== Reception ==
=== Critical response ===
Tom Buckley of The New York Times wrote in his review:"Even the capable and attractive Miss Dickinson, every housewife's fantasy of herself, can't make The Suicide's Wife bearable.

=== Release ===
The Suicide's Wife was released on September 19, 1995, on VHS by Congress Entertainment.
