= Don Matheson =

American actor (1929–2014)

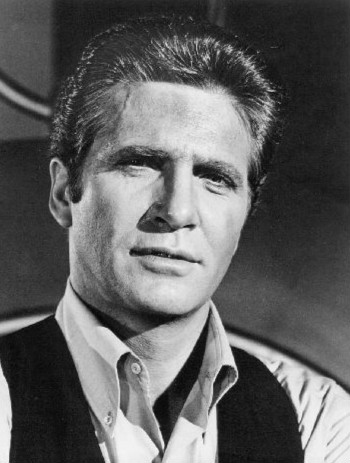
- Matheson in Land of the Giants.
- Born: August 5, 1929; Dearborn, Michigan, U.S.
- Died: June 29, 2014 (aged 84); Woodland Hills, Los Angeles, California, U.S.
- Occupation: Actor
- Spouse(s): Deanna Lund; Maxine Arnold
- Children: 1 (Michele Matheson)

Don Matheson (August 5, 1929 – June 29, 2014) was an American soldier and policeman who later became a television actor, perhaps best known for his continuing role in Irwin Allen's series Land of the Giants.

== Career ==
Prior to entering acting, Matheson served in the military. While serving in Korea, he was awarded the Bronze Star for valorous leadership and a Purple Heart for injuries suffered in an explosion.

After serving in the military for six years, he joined the Detroit Police Department. He then left law enforcement to begin a career in acting. In 1965 Matheson appeared in the Lost in Space episode, "The Sky Is Falling" in the non-speaking role of the alien Retho and then again in 1967 as IDAK Alpha 12 in the episode "Revolt of the Androids". The same year, he appeared as a guest star in the episode "Deadly Amphibians" on the sci-fi TV show's 4th season Voyage to the Bottom of the Sea.

After working in a number of plays, television episodes and commercials, Matheson was signed to join the cast of the Land of the Giants. In 1976, he played the role of wealthy industrialist, Cameron Faulker, who married Lesley Williams (Denise Alexander) on General Hospital. In 1984, Matheson had a regular role in Falcon Crest. He played Richard Channing's henchman for a season. He also appeared briefly in Dynasty.

== Personal life ==
Matheson married co-star Deanna Lund in 1970, but they were divorced in the late-1970s. Their daughter, Michele Matheson, is an actress and novelist. Matheson was later married to actress Maxine Arnold. He died on June 29, 2014, in Woodland Hills, Los Angeles from lung cancer, aged 84.

== Filmography ==
=== Film ===
Year	Title	Role	Notes
1975	Murph the Surf	Hauser	
1990	Dragonfight	Dartois	
1993	Younger and Younger	Max	

=== Television ===
Year	Title	Role	Notes
1962	The Alfred Hitchcock Hour	Jack Pierson	Season 1 Episode 5: "Captive Audience"
1962	McHale's Navy	Lt. Harris	Episode: "Operation Wedding Party"
1963	The Gallant Men	Soldier M.C.	Episode: "Tommy"
1965, 1967	Lost in Space	IDAK Alpha 12 / Rethso	2 episodes
1967	Death Valley Days	William Clark	Episode: "The Girl Who Walked the West"
1967	Voyage to the Bottom of the Sea	Proto	Episode: "Deadly Amphibians"
1968–1970	Land of the Giants	Mark Wilson	51 episodes
1972	Emergency!	Joseph Remson	Episode: "Crash"
1973	Shaft	Paul Hanson	Episode: "Hit-Run"
1974	Apple's Way	First Tree Cutter	Episode: "The Tree"
1974–1979	The Waltons	Sargeant Barnes / Coach	3 episodes
1974	General Hospital	Cameron Faulkner	Episode dated 30 October 1974
1975	The Runaways	Haines	Television film
1976	The Quest	Sam Grant	Episode: "Day of Outrage"
1977	Bravo Two	Mr. Morgan	Television film
1977–1981	Eight Is Enough	Ross / Robert Decker	4 episodes
1981, 1987	Dynasty	Commander / Frank Carter	2 episodes
1982	A New Day in Eden	Lockhart	Episode #1.1
1984	Falcon Crest	Mr. Padgett	10 episodes
1985	Murder, She Wrote	Chief Steward / Oklahoma Cowboy	2 episodes
1985	Alice in Wonderland	The Red Knight	Miniseries
1986	Hill Street Blues	D.A.	Episode: "Remembrance of Hits Past"
1986	Magnum, P.I.	Paul Mayfield	Episode: "Novel Connection"
1987	Six Against the Rock	Gen. Merrill	Television film
1988	Days of Our Lives	Judge Robert Novak	Episode #1.5656
1988	Santa Barbara	Frank Larson	3 episodes
1991	The New Lassie	Capt. Kelner	Episode: "The Stranger"
1992	Somebody's Daughter	Wilkie	Television film
1999	7th Heaven	Ron	Episode: "Nobody Knows..."
