= Stefan Arngrim =

Canadian actor

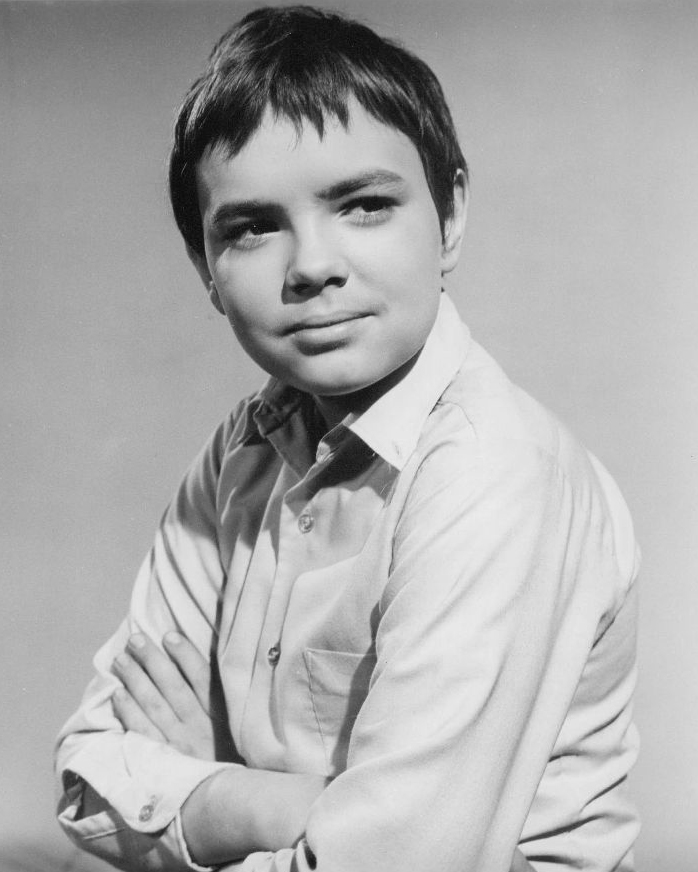
- Arngrim in 1968
- Born: Canada
- Other name: Stephan Arngrim
- Occupations: Actor, musician
- Years active: 1965–2015
- Mother: Norma MacMillan
- Relatives: Alison Arngrim (sister)
- Website: www.stefanarngrim.com

Stefan Arngrim is a Canadian former actor and musician. During his acting career he was sometimes credited as Stephan Arngrim.

== Biography ==
He is perhaps best known for his role as Barry Lockridge on the Irwin Allen television series Land of the Giants which aired from 1968 to 1970. Arngrim was born in Canada, the son of actress Norma MacMillan and Thor Arngrim. He is the elder brother of actress Alison Arngrim, who has alleged that he regularly raped and sexually abused her throughout her childhood.

== Filmography ==
- 2010 The A-Team as Howard 'Crazy Howard' Little
- 2011 Bringing Ashley Home as Dealer
- 2010 Concrete Canyons as Decker
- 2009 Angel and the Bad Man as Gamble
- 2008 The Secrets of Pine Cove as Eugene Fritts
- 2006 Unnatural & Accidental as Hotel Clerk
- 2005 The Fog as Blake's Compadre
- 2004 The Final Cut as Oliver
- 2004 The Life as Ed Nivens
- 2005 The Long Weekend as Bus Driver
- 1997 Misbegotten as Conan Cornelius
- 1995 Someone To Die For as Lazarro
- 1995 Strange Days as Skinner
- 1985 The Orkly Kid The Orkly Kid
- 1982 Class of 1984 as Drugstore
- 1981 Fear No Evil as Andrew Williams
- 1980 Getting Wasted as Charlie
- 1969 Silent Night, Lonely Night as Jerry Johnson
- 1967 The Way West as William J. Tadlock Jr.

== Television ==
- 2015 – Fargo – The Bank
- 2015 – Minority Report – Eyeless Man
- 2014 – Arrow
- 2011 – The Killing – Monty
- 2009 – V – Roy
- 2010 – Caprica – Amphead
- 2010 – Supernatural – Redcap
- 2009 – Fringe – The Store Owner
- 2007 – Battlestar Galactica: Razor – Male Captive
- 2004 – Earthsea – Shire Reeve
- Flash Gordon
- Da Vinci's Inquest (2 episodes)
- Dead Like Me
- Cold Squad
- UC: Undercover
- Special Unit 2
- Seven Days
- Call of the Wild
- The Crow: Stairway to Heaven
- Millennium (2 episodes)
- Dead Man's Gun
- Viper
- Police Academy: The Series
- Poltergeist: The Legacy
- The X-Files (2 episodes)
- The Sentinel
- Highlander: The Series
- The Private Tapes of Sev Banin
- T. J. Hooker
- Police Story
- Switch
- The Smith Family
- Land of the Giants – Series regular
- Here Come the Brides
- Dragnet
- The Virginian
- Gunsmoke
- Cyrano DeBergerac
- The Defenders
- Search for Tomorrow
- T.H.E. Cat
- Combat! – Gulliver episode
