= Deanna Lund =

American actress (1937–2018)

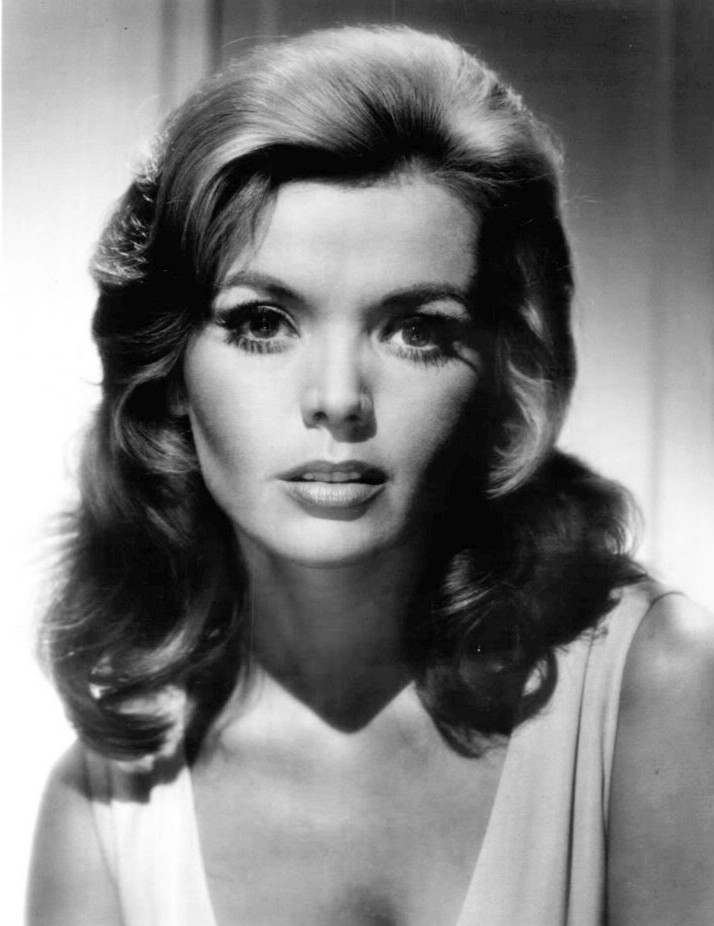
- Lund in Land of the Giants.
- Born: May 30, 1937; Oak Park, Illinois
- Died: June 22, 2018 (aged 81); Century City, Los Angeles, U.S.
- Occupation: Actress
- Years active: 1961–2017
- Spouse(s): Wilbur Owen Upson (m. 1958; div. 1963) Don Matheson (m. 1970; div. 1980) James E. Duffy (m. 1980; div. 19??)
- Children: 3, including Michele Matheson
- Website: deannalund.com

Deanna Lund (May 30, 1937 – June 22, 2018) was an American film and television actress best known for her role in the Irwin Allen television series Land of the Giants, in which she played Valerie Ames Scott.

== Early years ==
Born on May 30, 1937, in Oak Park, Illinois, Lund was the daughter of attorney Arthur Lund, who at one time served in the legislature of Illinois. The family moved to Daytona Beach, Florida, when she was eight. She studied drama at Rollins College, in Winter Park, Florida, but dropped out to get married. Before becoming an actress, she attended modeling school and worked as a secretary. Later, she did commercials on television and became a weather person at a television station.

== Career ==
Lund's early career included minor roles in the 1960s spy film parodies Dr. Goldfoot and the Bikini Machine (1965) and Dimension 5 (1966), as well as the horror film Sting of Death (1965), the beach film Out of Sight (1966), and the western Johnny Tiger (1966). She appeared as a lesbian stripper in the 1967 Frank Sinatra movie Tony Rome, but Lund was so embarrassed by the role that she had her name removed from the credits. Her performance was favorably received and led to a starring role in Irwin Allen's television series Land of the Giants. While waiting for filming to start, Lund was offered the part of Rosemary's friend Terry Gionoffrio in Rosemary's Baby but had to decline when, despite Roman Polanski's assurances, Allen did not believe she would be finished in time.

Valerie in Giantland, a novella written by Lund, is based on the Land of the Giants series, and set ten years later; written from the point of view of Lund's character, Valerie Scott. In 1976, she appeared on the drama General Hospital as Peggy Lowell, the secretary and mistress of Cameron Faulkner, who was played by Lund's husband Don Matheson. Her later films included the Jerry Lewis comedy Hardly Working (1980), Stick (1985) starring Burt Reynolds, and horror movies such as the Christmas horror film Elves (1989), Witch Story (1989), and the comedy Transylvania Twist (1989).

== Personal life ==
Lund dropped out of college to marry her high school sweetheart, Wilbur Owen Upson, in 1958; they had two children but divorced in 1963.

In 1970, shortly after Land of the Giants was cancelled, she married series co-star Don Matheson, but they were divorced by 1980. Their daughter, Michele Matheson, is also an actress.

In 1980, she married James E. Duffy, but they later divorced.

In 1995, she dated Larry King. The couple were engaged five weeks after they met but the relationship ended before they could be married.

Lund died on June 22, 2018, at her home in Century City, California, of pancreatic cancer, aged 81.

== Filmography ==
| Year | Title | Role | Notes |
|---|---|---|---|
| 1965 | Once Upon a Coffee House | Corrine | |
| 1965 | Run for Your Wife | — | Uncredited extra |
| 1965 | Dr. Goldfoot and the Bikini Machine | Robot | |
| 1966 | The Oscar | Bikini Girl | Uncredited |
| 1966 | Johnny Tiger | Louise | |
| 1966 | Paradise, Hawaiian Style | Nurse | Uncredited |
| 1966 | Out of Sight | Tuff Bod | |
| 1966 | Spinout | Redhead Beauty | Uncredited |
| 1966 | Sting of Death | Jessica, Honey Blond | |
| 1966 | Dimension 5 | Miss Sweet | |
| 1966 | The Swinger | Model | Uncredited |
| 1967 | Batman (TV series) | Anna Gram | 2 episodes |
| 1967 | Tony Rome | Georgia McKay | Uncredited |
| 1968 | Panic in the City | Blonde | |
| 1968 | Land of the Giants | Valerie Scott | Main cast |
| 1975 | Hustle | — | Uncredited extra |
| 1978 | The Incredible Hulk | Terri Ann | Episode: "Of Guilt, Models and Murder" |
| 1980 | Hardly Working | Millie | |
| 1985 | Stick | Diane | |
| 1987 | If We Knew Then | — | Extra |
| 1987 | Hammerhead | Dee-Dee | |
| 1989 | Streghe | Helena | |
| 1989 | Elves | Kirsten's Mother | |
| 1989 | Transylvania Twist | Teacher | |
| 1989 | Girl Talk | Dana | |
| 1990 | The Girl I Want | Mrs. Andrews | |
| 1992 | Roots of Evil | Marissa | |
| 2001 | Extreme Honor | Martha Brascoe | |
| 2015 | Boned | Faye | |
