= Land of the Giants =

American television series (1968–1970)

- Title screen from season 1
- Genre: Science fiction
- Created by: Irwin Allen
- Directed by: Irwin Allen; Harry Harris; Harmon Jones; Sobey Martin; Nathan Juran
- Starring: Gary Conway; Don Matheson; Kurt Kasznar; Don Marshall; Stefan Arngrim; Deanna Lund; Heather Young
- Theme music composer: John Williams
- Country of origin: United States
- Original language: English
- No. of seasons: 2
- No. of episodes: 51 (list of episodes)

Production
- Executive producer: Irwin Allen
- Producers: Irwin Allen; Bruce Fowler Jr.; Jerry Briskin
- Running time: 60 minutes (including commercials)
- Production companies: Irwin Allen Productions in association with Kent Productions Inc. and 20th Century-Fox Television

Original release
- Network: ABC
- Release: September 22, 1968 – March 22, 1970

Land of the Giants is a one-hour American science-fiction television series that aired on ABC for two seasons, beginning on September 22, 1968, and ending on March 22, 1970. It was created and produced by Irwin Allen. It was his fourth science-fiction TV series. It was released by 20th Century Fox Television. It was filmed entirely in color and ran for 51 episodes. The show starred Gary Conway, Deanna Lund, and Kurt Kasznar.

Five novels based on the series, including three written by science-fiction author Murray Leinster, were published in 1968 and 1969.

== Series overview ==
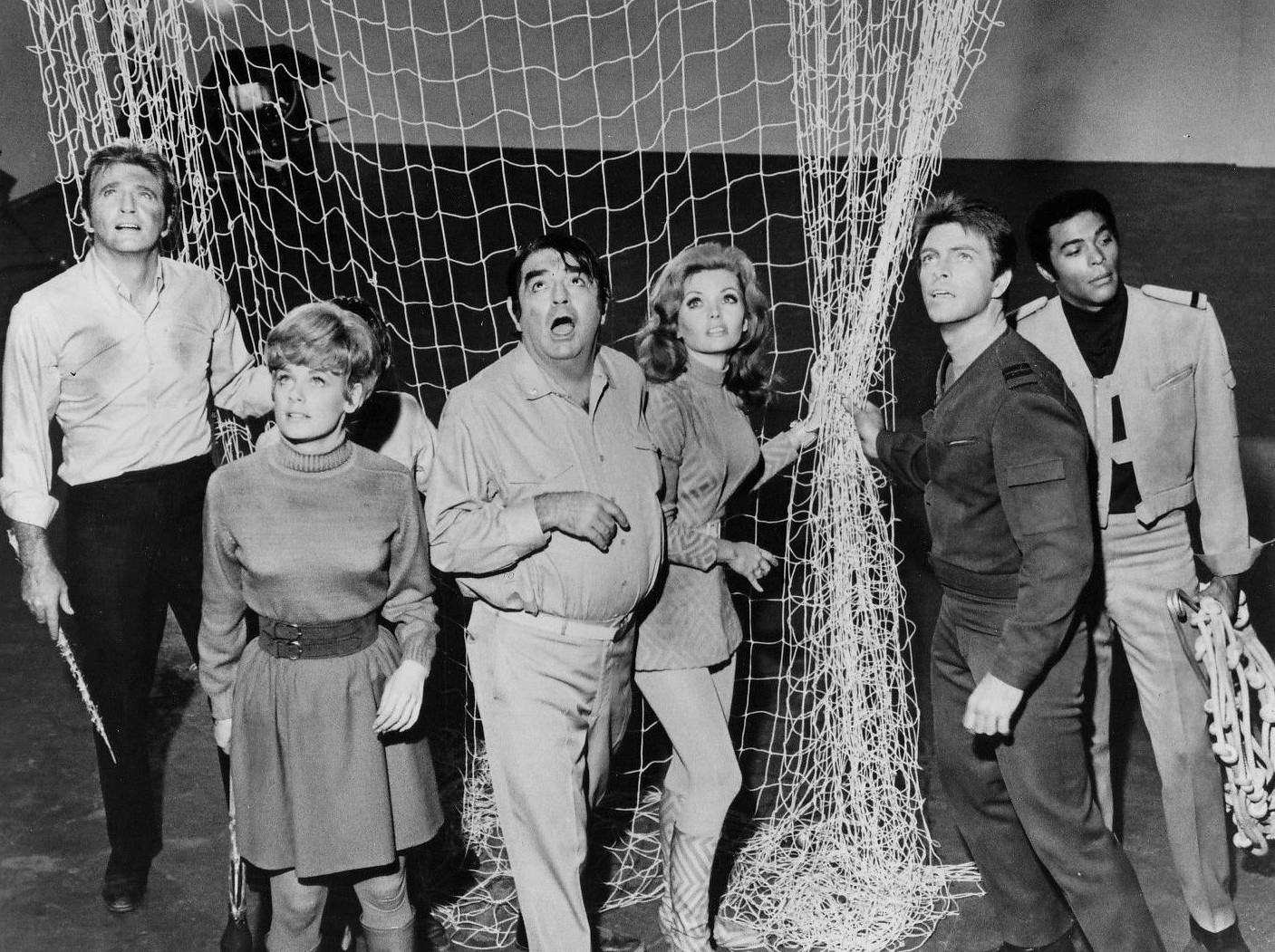
The travelers are trapped in a giant zoo.

Set in 1983 (at that time, 15 years in the future), the series concerns the passenger aircraft Spindrift, which is lost during a suborbital spaceflight from Los Angeles to London. Just beyond Earth's boundary with space, it is dragged through a "dimension lock" and crashes on a planet which is similar to Earth, except that everything is twelve times larger in size. The shipwreck is hidden in the woods outside of a city, inhabited by a 72 ft. humanoid race which the Earthlings refer to as "Giants".

Aside from their size, the Giants are indistinguishable from Earthlings. Culturally, their society resembles the United States of the 1960s with a police force, private hospitals, prisons, a State Governor, radio and television services, a zoo, jazz clubs, and even a racetrack. They speak English, have a combination of alien and Earth-like names, drive American-style cars, attend Vaudeville-style theaters and play chess, but they are dominated by an authoritarian government which tolerates full freedoms within a capitalist system, refusing to tolerate any effort to effect political change, even with repeated dissident activity. Exactly what the political situation is on other continents is not known, although at least one overseas land has a despotic ruler. The Air Traffic Control tells those who venture out to sea that they should turn back, that nothing beyond that sea has been explored nor is there current contact; whether this is an official government line or the truth is not known.

The Giants are familiar with the planet Earth and the "little people" who inhabit it, due to the arrivals of other ill-fated ships prior to the Spindrift. Some of the Giants' technology exceeds that of 20th-century Earth, including cloning, cybernetics, force fields, magnetic stunners, androids and teleporters, while remaining slightly behind in other areas, lacking microelectronics, hearing aids and crewed space flight. As such, the Earthlings cannot easily use the Giants' resources to return to the dimension lock, and the Giants have no way to study the little people except by capturing those that become stranded on their planet.

The Spindrift crew and passengers spend the series in search of supplies and the means to return to Earth, while avoiding capture. However, the ship's captain, Steve Burton, places a higher priority on preventing the Giants from obtaining the means to travel to Earth. The Giant government offers a reward for the Earthlings, who at times receive assistance from the dissident movement and other sympathizers. The Giants cannot easily be trusted, though, as some offer help only to later double-cross the Earthlings.

The show had no proper conclusion resolving the Earthlings' efforts to return home. The final episode, "Graveyard of Fools", was not designed to serve as a series finale. The penultimate episode, "Wild Journey", presents a time-travel plot in which the Earthlings go back into the past to prevent the Spindrift flight, but instead create the circumstances that cause the ship to be lost. The first season comprised a regular 26 episodes, but season two was left one episode short. The show thus comprises only 51 episodes (or 52 episodes including the unaired pilot).

== Episodes ==
Season	Episodes	Originally released	
Season	Episodes	First released	Last released
1	26	September 22, 1968	April 20, 1969
2	25	September 21, 1969	March 22, 1970

== Cast ==
- Gary Conway as Captain Steve Burton, pilot of the Spindrift
- Don Matheson as Mark Wilson, a multimillionaire engineer
- Stefan Arngrim as Barry Lockridge, a recently orphaned boy traveling with his dog, Chipper, to London to live with cousins.
- Don Marshall as Dan Erickson, co-pilot of the Spindrift
- Deanna Lund as Valerie Scott, a wealthy heiress
- Heather Young as Betty Hamilton, flight attendant on the Spindrift
- Kurt Kasznar as Commander Alexander Fitzhugh, who had stolen $1 million and was trying to flee to London, where he did not know police were waiting to arrest him.
- Kevin Hagen as Inspector Kobick (recurring character)

Land of the Giants guest stars included Jack Albertson, Michael Ansara, John Carradine, Yvonne Craig, Charles Drake, Alan Hale Jr, Jonathan Harris, Lee Meriwether, Larry Pennell, Warren Stevens, Glenn Corbett, and Ron Howard.

== Production ==
The show was created by Irwin Allen. With a budget of US$250,000 (equivalent to $2,315,000 in 2025) per episode, Land of the Giants set a new record. The actors had to be physically fit, as they had to do many stunts, such as climbing giant curbs, phone cords, and ropes. Don Marshall, who played the part of Dan Erickson, credited his previous football, track, and pole-vaulting work for helping him with the stunts required.

Elements of Allen's Lost in Space series recur in Land of the Giants, notably the relationship between foolish, greedy, on-the-run bank robber Commander Alexander Fitzhugh (Kurt Kasznar) and the young boy Barry Lockridge (Stefan Arngrim), paralleling the relationship on Lost in Space between Doctor Smith and the young Will Robinson. Also, for main-cast billing, Kasznar was treated contractually in the same manner as Jonathan Harris had been on Lost in Space—billed in last place on the opening credit sequence, but billed as "Special Guest Star" (though he was a series regular). Apart from this, Gary Conway received solo star billing in the opening credits, with the other regulars all receiving "also starring" billing.

The show was originally intended to premiere as a midseason replacement in the spring of 1968, and the first 12 episodes were shot in the fall of 1967. This was changed and Giants premiered in September 1968 for a full season. The network screened the episodes in a significantly different order from the production sequence. This caused disconcerting lapses in continuity, since in the first 12 episodes filmed (but not in later episodes) the Giants moved slowly and hardly spoke. For example, "Ghost Town" was the 14th episode filmed (i.e. was not one of the original 12 episodes), but was the second episode aired.

The cost of production was immense, partly because of the special optical effects needed to matte the little people into shots also showing the giants, and partly because of the oversize sets and physical props needed for the Earth people to interact within shots depicting the giant-sized world, and the futuristic spacecraft sets that were needed to represent the Spindrift. Because of the enormous cost, filming episodes in pairs using the same sets was more efficient and cost-effective, so writers were informed about what giant-sized props were available, which they could incorporate into their storylines. These episodes were filmed back-to-back.

To save on production costs, Allen was not above using the same device he had employed on The Time Tunnel—reusing stock footage from 20th Century Fox's film library. For instance, in the episode "Collector's Item", footage of Wayne Manor from Batman is recycled as the luxury mansion home of a rich giant.

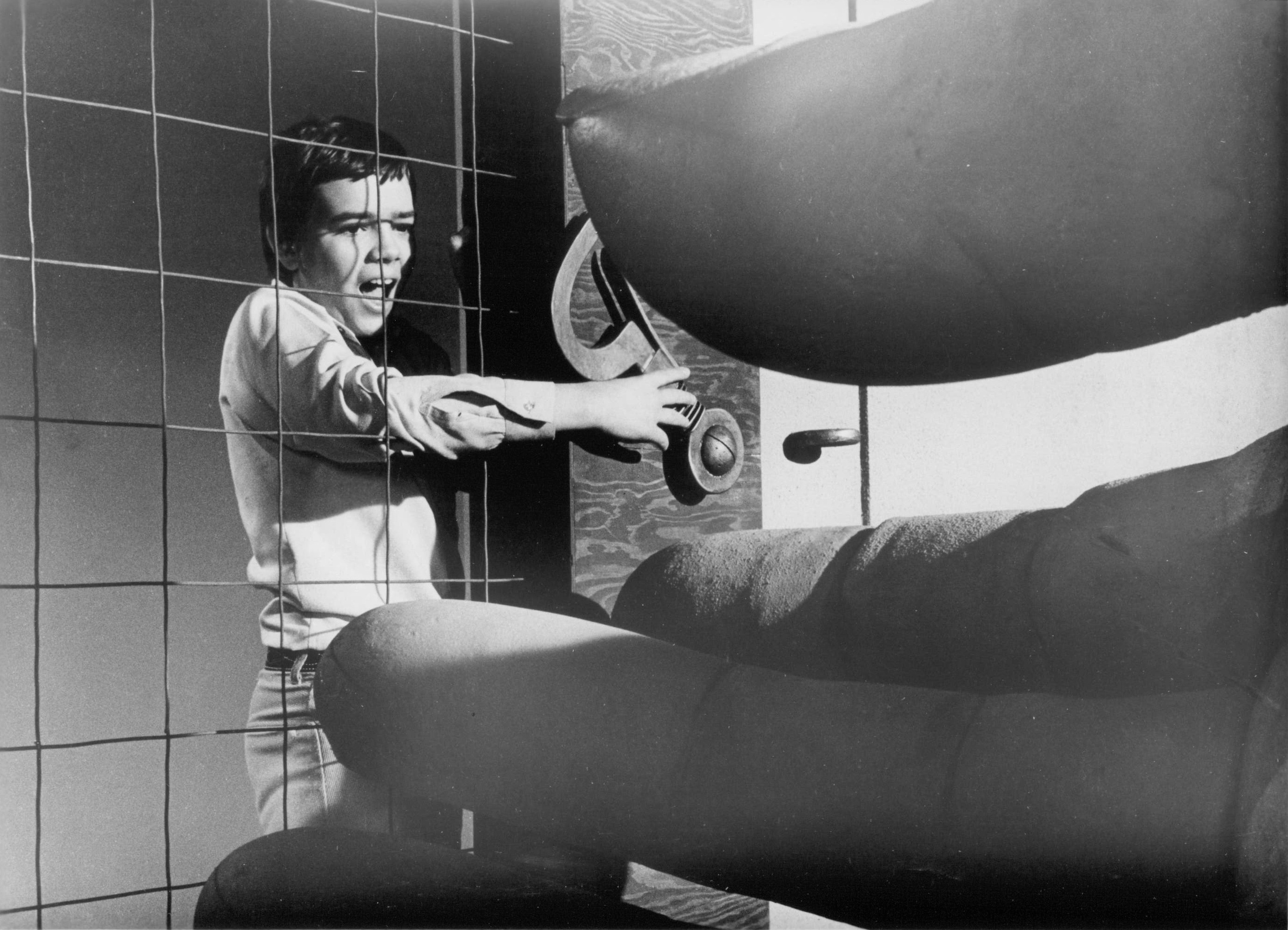
Large hand in a scene from the second season, which featured Stefan Arngrim as Barry Lockridge.

The original unaired pilot, with story by and directed by Irwin Allen, featured more scenes focusing on the backstories and character traits of the main characters. Upon receiving confirmation that the show had been picked up by the network, the pilot was reworked and production began on succeeding episodes. Some original scenes were cut and others condensed for the broadcast pilot in favor of new effects scenes featuring encounters with giant animals to better pique audience interest. A break in production occurred after 12 episodes were in the can (enough for a short run as a midseason replacement), until the show received the green light on the decision to launch it as a full season the following fall.

=== Music ===
Like Allen's previous series Lost in Space and The Time Tunnel, the theme music for the series was composed by John Williams. As with Lost in Space, Williams composed two different themes (in this case one for each season). The unaired pilot featured a theme by Alexander Courage and relied heavily on stock incidental music from Lost in Space, but the broadcast pilot, "The Crash", was rescored by Williams before the show's premiere. He was the third composer to be attached to the project. Joseph Mullendore had composed a second theme that was also thrown out. Mullendore later scored five episodes and Courage did one, with other episodes scored by Richard LaSalle (seven episodes), Leith Stevens (five), Harry Geller (four), Irving Gertz, Paul Sawtell and Robert Prince (one each).

==== Soundtrack ====
GNP Crescendo released an album as part of The Fantasy Worlds of Irwin Allen, featuring both themes, Williams' replacement score (tracks 2–6) and Courage's thrown-out score (tracks 9 and 10) for "The Crash".

1. Land of the Giants Main Title – Season 1 (1:02)
2. Off Course/The Landing/Dense Fog (6:01)
3. Giant Eyes/Hidden Gun/The Big Cat/Bug Box (8:45)
4. Fitzhugh's Gun/Hiding Place (6:57)
5. Giants Probing/The Rescue (3:35) (note: most copies are actually missing most of Giants Probing)
6. Water Drain/More Garbage (2:44)
7. Land of the Giants End Title – Season 1 (:31)
8. Land of the Giants Main Title – Season 2 (1:01)
9. Space Storm/Through The Thing/Crash Landing/Giant Ford (6:08)
10. The Sniveling Sneak (6:45)
11. Land of the Giants End Title – Season 2 (:30)

LaLaLand Records subsequently released "Land of the Giants - 50th Anniversary Soundtrack Collection: Limited Edition, a deluxe 4-CD box set featuring the original music from the series.

== Home media ==
All 51 episodes were released on DVD in Region 1 in a limited-edition nine-disc Complete Series on July 24, 2007, from 20th Century Fox Home Entertainment. This includes the unaired original pilot and interviews with cast members.

In Region 2, Revelation Films has released the entire series on DVD in the UK. Season one and two were released on March 28 and June 13, 2011, respectively. They also released a complete series set on March 12, 2012.

In Region 4, Madman Entertainment released season one on DVD in Australia on August 20, 2014. They released season two on November 12 of the same year.

== Merchandise and licensing ==
The pilot episode was the subject of a View-Master reel and booklet set in 1968 (GAF Packet # B494). One notable difference between the aired episode and the reel set is an image of the Spindrift flying through the giant forest in apparent daylight. In the aired episode, the Spindrift arrives on the Giants' planet during the night, and its flight through the forest also occurs that same night. Though the following is unconfirmed, either the daylight shot was a special-effects sequence cut from the aired pilot, or a special setup for the View-Master photographers.

In 1968, Pyramid Books published three original tie-in novels, the first named for the series (Land of the Giants, Pyramid Books, X-1846), written by famed author Murray Leinster. Per usual for Pyramid tie-in book series of the era, #1 offered an alternate origin story of the author's devising. Among his notable changes and inventions is that the Spindrift is still an operational, flying ship after the initial crash, with enough "atomic power" to last as much as several months. Another invention for the novel is the knowledge that two other ships, the Anne and Marintha, disappeared by the same mysterious phenomenon that sends the Spindrift to the Giants' planet. The Spindrift castaways encounter a female survivor of the Anne, named Marjorie, who joins the castaways in this novel. (Although the television series featured three episodes with other on-screen survivors from previously lost Earth flights, the novel's character Marjorie and the ships Anne and Marintha do not appear and are not mentioned in the series.) Taking into account other premise-introducing TV tie-ins by Leinster (specifically Men Into Space and his first based on The Time Tunnel), and how soon after the show's debut the first book hit the stands, it's a certainty that he based his work on advance publicity materials (which may or may not have included a pilot script and/or a show bible and/or production stills) without having first seen any episodes…and then maintained his own internal continuity for the next two books. (In this pre-VCR era, tie-in novelists hewing to their own non-canonistic "take" on a premise was not uncommon.)

Those two additional novels were The Hot Spot and Unknown Danger (Pyramid, 1969). The first two Leinster books were reprinted in 1969 in the United Kingdom by World Distributors, the eponymous novel retitled The Trap. Unknown Danger was not published in the UK, but World Distributors also published two United Kingdom-only novels the same year, Slingshot for a David and The Mean City; both were credited to James Bradwell, a pseudonym for Arthur William Charles Kent.

A hardback novel for children, Flight of Fear by Carl Henry Rathjen (1969), was published in the United States by Whitman.

Also in 1968, Gold Key Comics published a comic-book version of Land of the Giants, which ran five issues from November 1968 to September 1969. In 2010, all five issues were reprinted together as a hardcover book by Hermes Press.

In 1968, Aurora Plastics Corporation produced two plastic model kits based on the series: Land of the Giants was the title of a diorama depicting a giant snake attacking characters Steve Burton, Betty Hamilton, and Dan Erickson, who uses a giant safety pin as a spear. The second kit was a model of the Spindrift, released as Land of the Giants Space Ship, instead of using the proper name for the vehicle.

In 1975, Aurora reissued the kit (now renamed Rocket Transport Spindrift), with new box art and photos of the assembled kit. It had a front, top section that could be lifted off, revealing a full interior that had to be constructed by the builder, as well as a working door. Most of the model kit was molded in the same bright red-orange as the ship itself, while the interior was molded in a light green, which could be painted.

In 1969, Aladdin Industries released a metal, embossed lunch box based on the series. The artist, Elmer Lenhardt, used his own likeness for a giant scientist taunting the little people. A reproduction of the lunch box was later released by Fab Gear USA in a limited edition of 5,000.

Deanna Lund (Valerie Scott) co-wrote a series of short stories based on the series, under the collective title "Valerie in Giant Land".

MeTV began airing Land of the Giants in September 2016 to complement its Saturday-night sci-fi line-up of other Irwin Allen series: Voyage to the Bottom of the Sea, Lost in Space, and The Time Tunnel. Prior to debuting on MeTV, Land of the Giants had aired only sporadically in syndication in recent years. The Horror Channel in the UK aired the series in full from September 19 of the same year, showing one episode a day on weekdays, for 10 weeks. In the 1980s, "Land of The Giants" was rerun on the USA Network as part of a weekday morning block which also included "Lost in Space" from Irwin Allen. The Sci-Fi Channel rebroadcast "Land of the Giants" along with other Irwin Allen series during the early years of its operation.

== See also ==
- A Fortnight in Heaven
