= Heather Young (actress) =

American actress

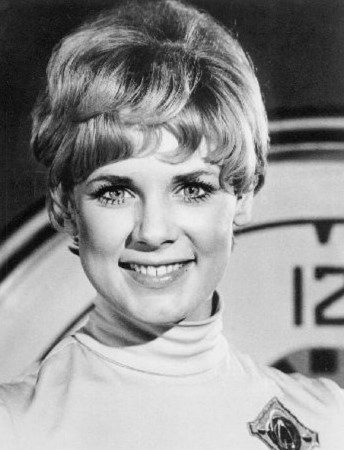
- Young in Land of the Giants
- Born: Patricia Kay Petersen; April 1, 1945 (age 81); Bremerton, Washington, U.S.
- Occupations: Actress, playwright
- Years active: 1967–1980

Heather Young (born Patricia Kay Petersen; April 1, 1945) is an American former actress best known for playing stewardess Betty Ann Hamilton on the Irwin Allen science fiction series Land of the Giants (1968–1970).

== Early years ==
Young was born in Bremerton, Washington; her mother, Charlotte Hunter Petersen, was from there. Her father, Mervin Petersen, was a civil engineer with the United States Geological Survey who also served as a bishop in the Church of Jesus Christ of Latter-day Saints in Rolla, Missouri for eleven years. His engineering work required frequent relocation; Young attended schools in Hyde Park, Utah; Riverton, Wyoming; Takoma Park, Maryland; and Rolla before enrolling at Brigham Young University in Provo, Utah.

At BYU, Young sang in a trio with fellow students Sandi Jensen (later known as Sandi Griffiths) and Salli Flynn (later known as Sally Flynn), performing under the university's Program Bureau. Together they toured widely, including a three-month USO circuit in 1964 through Japan, Korea, Taiwan, Guam, Okinawa, Iwo Jima, the Philippines, and Hawaii.

During her third year at BYU, a 20th Century Fox executive attending a campus awards ceremony for The Sound of Music invited her to audition at the studio. The trio then took a summer engagement performing on the Tomorrowland stage at Disneyland. At the end of the summer, Young contacted Fox and signed a contract; Sandi and Salli went on to sign with Capitol Records and became regulars on The Lawrence Welk Show, while Young later reflected that her higher voice did not suit the trio's sound without her.

When Young attempted to register for the Screen Actors Guild under the name Pattie Petersen, the guild informed her that the name was already held by Patty Petersen, the sister of Paul Petersen and a cast member of The Donna Reed Show. Young chose "Heather" as her first name, a name she said she had long preferred, having rejected the alternative "Patty Kay" as too close to "patty cake." A Fox casting director then asked whether she had attended Brigham Young University, and upon hearing that she had, said: "We'll call you 'Heather Young' after your school."

== Career ==
Fox enrolled Young in acting and dance classes alongside fellow contractees including Tom Selleck, Jacqueline Bisset, Lyle Waggoner, Linda Harrison, and James Brolin. In 1967, she appeared in the Batman two-parter "The Contaminated Cowl"/"The Mad Hatter Runs Afoul" as President Johnson's secretary, in "Tempest in a Texas Town" on Judd, for the Defense as Terry Ann Brendler — billed in the broadcast credits under her birth name, "Patti Petersen" — and in "Kiss Me, Kill You" on The Felony Squad as Aggie, a character whose brother was played by Jeremy Clyde of Chad and Jeremy. She also appeared as the girl with the megaphone in the Gene Kelly-directed comedy A Guide for the Married Man (1967) and guest starred in "Town of Terror," the final episode of Allen's The Time Tunnel.

Allen subsequently cast Young as Betty Ann Hamilton in Land of the Giants, which ran for 51 episodes over two seasons from 1968 to 1970. She described the series as offering "plenty of action but not enough acting" and found the role "fun but not fulfilling." Filming of the second season was complicated by her pregnancy; she continued working until two weeks before the birth and later recalled performing more stunt work during the pregnancy than in all previous episodes combined.

After Land of the Giants was cancelled, Young appeared in the television movie In Name Only (1969) alongside Christopher Connelly, and in two episodes of the religious anthology series Insight (1969–1970), including "The Dangerous Airs of Amy Clark" again with Connelly. She appeared as LuAnn in the television pilot Oh, Nurse! (1972). Between 1972 and 1980, she did not appear in film or television but performed in stage productions, including lead roles in Annie (as Grace, opposite Harve Presnell), Camelot (as Guinevere), and Kiss Me, Kate (as Kate).

In 1980, Young returned to television in Galactica 1980, appearing in "The Night the Cylons Landed" as a theatrical performer who sings "On the Good Ship Lollipop" wearing a blond Shirley Temple-style wig. The role came through her friendship with series creator Glen A. Larson; she rehearsed for a full week but developed a migraine on the day of filming and was unable to complete her close-up shots.

In the early 1980s, Young signed a contract with Paramount Pictures for a television series adaptation of Foul Play, and was set to play the role originated on screen by Goldie Hawn. After she had signed, the studio redirected her toward a different project. "Turns out, it was Bosom Buddies, with Tom Hanks," she later said. "What an idiot I was. That is a lesson I'll never forget."

After stepping away from acting, Young wrote three full-scale stage musicals, the most widely produced being an adaptation of Jane Eyre that toured community theatres in Santa Barbara, California; Los Angeles; Brigham Young University (in venues of 1,500 to 2,000 seats); and a theatre near Disneyland. Under the name Patricia York, she also recorded an album titled Quiet Before the Storm, for which she wrote several songs and worked with session musicians in Nashville, Tennessee.

== Personal life ==
Young married David Youkstetter, at the time a business administrator at TRW, at the Salt Lake Temple on June 14, 1968; the two had met in California and had not been acquainted during their overlapping years at BYU. Their first child, a son named Brandon, was born on August 30, 1969. By 1979, the couple had settled in Sonoma County, California, where Youkstetter was working as a youth counselor and both served as youth leaders and foster parents. The couple had five children together and took in foster children for approximately fifteen years. By the late 1980s, the family had relocated to Salt Lake City, Utah.

Young and Youkstetter divorced in the early 1990s, after which she changed her legal name to Patricia York. Youkstetter died some years later; Young said in a 2023 interview that the two had resumed living together "in the same house, the last eight years of his life."

== See also ==
- A Guide for the Married Man
