= Young Pioneers (film) =

1976 TV film

- Genre: Drama; Western
- Based on: Let the Hurricane Roar; Free Land by Rose Wilder Lane
- Screenplay by: Blanche Hanalis
- Directed by: Michael O'Herlihy
- Starring: Linda Purl; Roger Kern
- Music by: Laurence Rosenthal
- Country of origin: United States
- Original language: English

Production
- Executive producer: Ed Friendly
- Producer: Ed Friendly
- Production locations: Twentieth Century-Fox Studios, Los Angeles, California; Southern Arizona, Arizona
- Cinematography: Robert L. Morrison
- Editor: Allan LaMastra
- Running time: 97 minutes
- Production company: ABC Circle Films

Original release
- Network: ABC
- Release: March 1, 1976

Young Pioneers is a 1976 American Western television film which aired in March 1976 on ABC. Elements of novels Let the Hurricane Roar and Free Land by Rose Wilder Lane (daughter of Laura Ingalls Wilder) were used as the basis for the movie, with Roger Kern and Linda Purl starring as the focal characters David and Molly Beaton. Although produced as a TV series pilot by ABC Circle Films and ranked #7 in the Nielsen ratings for the week it aired, the movie was not immediately picked up by ABC as a series. A second pilot attempt was made in December 1976 with Young Pioneers' Christmas, but ranked lower at #37 in the Nielsen ratings. In 1978 The Young Pioneers (miniseries) was broadcast.

== Plot ==
David and Molly Beaton, 18-years-old and 16-years-old respectively, marry and leave their native Iowa to make a life for themselves as homesteaders in the Dakota Territory of the early 1870s. The U.S. Government Homestead Act offers applicants 160 acres of land in undeveloped areas. Those who stay on the land for five years become the official owners.

The young couple manages to survive government and railroad corruption, and perseveres through blizzards, a grasshopper invasion, crop destruction, and giving birth in a sod house among other challenges.

== Production ==
The project was developed and produced by Ed Friendly for ABC Circle Films with the script written by Blanche Hanalis and directed by Michael O'Herlihy. Ed Friendly and Blanche Hanalis had previously produced and scripted the television series pilot for Little House on the Prairie based on the novels by Laura Ingalls Wilder, the mother of Rose Wilder Lane.

400 actors and actresses were interviewed before Linda Purl and Roger Kern were offered the lead roles of Molly and David Beaton.

Principal photography began November 28, 1975, in Southern Arizona with additional filming at the Old Tucson Studios in Tucson, Arizona. A scene with 180,000 grasshoppers was done on location in Nogales, Mexico. Sound stages at 20th-Century Fox in Los Angeles, California were used for the blizzard scenes.

== Cast ==
- Roger Kern as David Beaton
- Linda Purl as Molly Beaton
- Robert Hays as Dan Grey
- Shelly Juttner as Nettie Peters
- Robert Donner as Mr. Peters
- Frank Marth as Mr. Svenson
- Brendan Dillon as Doyle
- Charles Tyner as Mr. Beaton
- Jonathan Kidd as Dr. Thorne
- Arnold Soboloff as Clerk in Land Office
- Britt Leach as Mr. Loftus
- Dennis Fimple as Man in Land Office
- Bernice Smith as Mrs. Svenson
- Janis Jamison as Eliza
- Jeff Cotler as Charlie Peters
- Lucky Hayes as Second Woman
- Earl W. Smith as Man in Boxcar
- Michelle Stacy as Flora Peters
- Mare Winningham as Nettie Peters
