= The Young Pioneers (miniseries) =

- Genre: Western family drama
- Based on: Young Pioneers by Rose Wilder Lane
- Developed by: Blanche Hanalis (developed for television by)
- Directed by: Irving J. Moore; Alf Kjellin
- Starring: Linda Purl; Roger Kern
- Opening theme: Dominic Frontiere (instrumental)
- Country of origin: United States
- No. of seasons: 1
- No. of episodes: 3

Production
- Executive producers: Lee Rich; Earl Hamner
- Producers: Robert L. Jacks; Ed Friendly (originally produced by)
- Running time: varied – 97 and 47 minutes

Original release
- Network: ABC
- Release: April 2 – April 16, 1978

The Young Pioneers was a trial-run American Broadcasting Company Western television series about young newlyweds who settle in the Dakota Territory during the 1870s. If the first three episodes had received good ratings the series may have found a place on the network's fall lineup.

The series was based on the plot of Rose Wilder Lane's 1933 novel Let the Hurricane Roar, which was reissued as Young Pioneers though the main characters names came from her novel Free Land.

In March 1975, the television film Young Pioneers was watched by 40 million viewers, so in December 1975 a second film Young Pioneers' Christmas continued the story of homesteaders Molly and David Beaton, and served as a pilot for a planned ABC series. The Young Pioneers series aired on Sundays at 7 p.m. The first episode was a two-hour movie, followed by two sixty-minute episodes.

== Cast ==
- Linda Purl as Molly Beaton, newly married homesteader
- Roger Kern as David Beaton, newly married homesteader
- Robert Hays as Dan Gray, neighboring homesteader
- Robert Donner as Mr. Peters, neighboring homesteader
- Mare Winningham as Nettie Peters, daughter of Mr. Peters
- Michelle Stacy as Flora Peters, daughter of Mr. Peters
- Jeff Cotler as Charlie Peters, son of Mr. Peters

== Production ==
The series' exterior scenes were filmed on the Empire Ranch, near Sonoita, Arizona, with interior shots filmed at the 20th Century-Fox studios in Hollywood. Four sod structures were built for the series, with a house and a barn in both Arizona and California.

Ed Friendly, who had earlier produced the two-hour pilot film for NBCs Little House on the Prairie, was The Young Pioneers producer. Earl Hamner, creator of The Waltons, was brought in to help with the project. He wanted the series to progress like a novel, with each episode to be a single chapter, and the audience seeing the progression of the nearest town of Wildrose.

== Episodes ==
| No. | Title | Directed by | Written by | Original release date |
|---|---|---|---|---|
| 1 | "Sky in the Window" | Irving J. Moore | Blanche Hanalis, Robert Pirosh, Katharyn Powers | April 2, 1978 |
Molly and David are held hostage in their barn by Native Americans. Will the wounded brave allow Molly to help him?
| 2 | "A Kite for Charlie" | Irving J. Moore | Blanche Hanalis | April 9, 1978 |
Neighbor boy Charlie may die unless the town's young inexperienced doctor performs surgery on him.
| 3 | "A Promise for Spring" | Irving J. Moore | Blanche Hanalis | April 16, 1978 |
Molly is seriously injured during a prairie storm.
