= Young Pioneers' Christmas =

- Genre: Drama; Western
- Based on: Young Pioneers by Rose Wilder Lane
- Screenplay by: Blanche Hanalis
- Directed by: Michael O'Herlihy
- Starring: Linda Purl; Roger Kern
- Music by: Laurence Rosenthal
- Country of origin: United States
- Original language: English

Production
- Executive producer: Ed Friendly
- Producer: Ed Friendly
- Production locations: Twentieth Century-Fox Studios, Los Angeles, California; Southern Arizona, Arizona
- Cinematography: Robert L. Morrison
- Editor: Allan LaMastra
- Running time: 91 min.
- Production companies: ABC Circle Films; ABC

Original release
- Network: ABC
- Release: December 1976

Young Pioneers' Christmas is a 1976 American made-for-television Western drama film which was broadcast by ABC in December 1976 as a Christmas special starring Linda Purl and Roger Kern. It was a sequel to the made-for-television movie Young Pioneers which aired earlier in March 1976 and was produced using the same creative team of Ed Friendly (producer), Blanche Hanalis (screenwriter), and Michael O'Herlihy (director). The movie is loosely based on the 1933 novel Let the Hurricane Roar by Rose Wilder Lane, which was reissued by Bantam Books in 1976 using the same title of Young Pioneers for the paperback book.

This was a second attempt to interest ABC in a TV series after Young Pioneers was not picked up by the network. There were hopes this pilot would succeed but it ranked only 37th in the Nielsen ratings. Although not initially picked up by ABC, it was revived as a short-lived television series, The Young Pioneers, which was broadcast in April 1978 on ABC and canceled after three episodes.

== Plot ==
It is winter in the prairie town of Wildrose in 1874. Molly and David Beaton struggle with grief after the death of their baby son. Their sense of loss is exacerbated when the railroad company invokes eminent domain over their neighbor's property in order to bypass the Sioux Indian reservation. It is a hard Christmas (their tree is made of pine cones because trees are hard to come by on the prairie) but their courage and spirit prevail.

== Production ==
Production began in mid-summer 1976 with set construction at the Empire Ranch near Sonoita, Arizona. Complete buildings were fabricated for the town of 'Wildrose,' with the inclusion of a railroad spur and depot. Some scenes were filmed at Fox Studios in Los Angeles, California due to a lack of available facilities in the Tucson, Arizona area. Location filming in Arizona commenced in August and was completed in September.

ABC Circle Films negotiated with a local aviation firm in Arizona for conversion of a hangar into a sound stage in anticipation of the project becoming a series. When it was not picked up by ABC the entire set consisting of 18 buildings, a railroad station and track, two water towers and 20 utility poles were sold and carted off to Sierra Vista, Arizona.

== Cast ==
- Linda Purl as Molly Beaton
- Roger Kern as David Beaton
- Robert Hays as Dan Gray
- Kay Kimler as Nettie Peters
- Robert Donner as Mr. Peters
- Britt Leach as Loftus
- Arnold Soboloff as Yancy
- Brendan Dillon as Doyle
- Rand Bridges as Pike
- Brian Melrose as Charlie Peters
- Sherri Wagner as Flora Peters

== See also ==
- List of Christmas films
