= Freeland =

Freeland may refer to:

== Places ==
=== Canada ===
- Freeland, Prince Edward Island

=== United Kingdom ===
- Freeland, Oxfordshire

=== United States ===
- Freeland, Maryland
- Freeland, Michigan
- Freeland, Ohio
- Freeland, Pennsylvania
- Freeland, Washington

== Other uses ==
- Freeland (surname)
- Freeland, the English title of the Utopian 1890 novel Freiland by Theodor Hertzka
- Freeland, a 2020 film directed by Mario Furloni and Kate McLean
- Freeland, the attributed artist name of Adam Freeland, an English musician and producer
- Freeland, a city where the 2018 CW series Black Lightning takes place
- Virtual State of Freeland, a virtual state in the Russian animated web series Mr. Freeman
- Freeland Foundation, an international NGO concerned with environmental conservation and human rights

== See also ==
- Free Land (disambiguation)
- Freedland
