= Don Most =

American actor (born 1953)

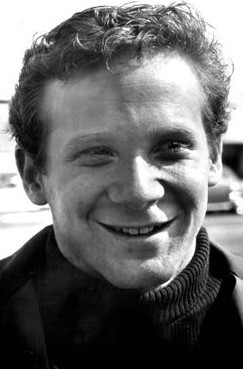
- Most as Ralph Malph, 1974
- Born: August 8, 1953 (age 73); Brooklyn, New York, U.S.
- Other name: Donny Most
- Occupation: Actor
- Years active: 1973–present
- Known for: Happy Days; Dungeons & Dragons
- Notable work: Zonk
- Spouse: Morgan Hart (m. 1982)
- Children: 2
- Website: realdonnymost.com

Don Most (born August 8, 1953) is an American actor. He is known for his role as Ralph Malph on the television series Happy Days.

== Early life and education ==
Most was born to a Jewish family in Brooklyn, New York City. He lived in Flatbush, Brooklyn, New York, and graduated from Erasmus Hall High School in 1970. He attended Lehigh University for three years from 1970 to 1973, but did not graduate. Originally intending to study engineering, he changed his major to business after his first semester. He made plans during his junior year to spend the summer of 1973 in search of acting jobs in Hollywood before completing his studies at Lehigh. Instead, he landed the Ralph Malph role on his third audition and moved to California to pursue acting full-time.

== Career ==
=== Acting ===
Most had earlier guest roles on Emergency! and Police Story. Most appeared on the final filmed but never aired episode of Room 222, entitled "Jason and Big Mo", playing the role of Louie, the red-headed class wisecracker. David Jolliffe had handled the role of Louie in all prior episodes.

Most played jokester Ralph on Happy Days, regularly appearing up until the show’s seventh season, leaving along with Ron Howard in 1980 (with their characters written off by having them join the Army and get shipped to Greenland). Most and Howard both returned in the final season as guest stars.

Most has appeared in other film and television work. Film credits include Leo and Loree (1980), EDtv (1999), Planting Melvin (2005), and The Great Buck Howard (2008). He also made the regular round of guest appearances on TV shows like Fantasy Island, CHiPs, Murder, She Wrote, Baywatch, The Love Boat, Sliders, Star Trek: Voyager, Diagnosis: Murder (reuniting with his Happy Days co-star Pat Morita), Yes, Dear, and Glee.

He also made an appearance on the TV sitcom Charles in Charge, in the episode "It's a Blunderfull Life" (alongside his former Happy Days co-star, Scott Baio).

In 1980, he began acting in theatre, joining a regional touring production of Wait Until Dark. Most has also made stage appearances in plays such as The Sunshine Boys with Robert Wuhl at Judson Theatre Company in 2017 and Middletown at Bucks County Playhouse in 2019.

Most performed as a voice actor on several Saturday morning cartoon series. Among these roles were: Ralph Malph on The Fonz and the Happy Days Gang (1980); Eric the Cavalier in Dungeons & Dragons (1983); and Stiles on Teen Wolf (1986–1989). Most had a cameo as himself in the fifth season Family Guy episode "It Takes a Village Idiot, and I Married One" in 2007.

Most directed the independent films The Last Best Sunday (1999) and Moola (2007).

=== Music ===
United Artists released Most's only pop album, Donny Most, in the fall of 1976; it did not achieve any hit-parade success. A single from the album, "All Roads (Lead Back to You)" b/w "Better to Forget Her" (aided by Most performing it on an episode of Happy Days) spent three weeks on the Billboard Hot 100 in December 1976, peaking at #97; a second single, "One of These Days", was released as a promo to radio stations only. Most released two other pop singles, "Here's Some Love" b/w "I'm Gonna Love Loving You" on the Venture label in 1978 and "I Only Want What's Mine", from the soundtrack of the film Leo and Loree (which starred Most and occasional Happy Days co-star Linda Purl) on Casablanca Records in 1980; neither record charted.

As of 2015, Most has performed and produced swing music. In 2016, he released a Christmas CD, Swinging Down The Chimney Tonight on Summit Records. As of 2017, he was touring the U.S. in a show called "Donny Most Sings and Swings", performing a set of 1950s songs with a seven-piece backing band. Many of the songs in the band's set were originally performed by Frank Sinatra.

In 2023, Most reached a career high, with the full-length album "New York High."

== Discography ==
=== Albums/EP's ===
- Donny Most (1976)
- Swinging Down the Chimney Tonight (2016)
- D Most Mostly Swinging (2017)
- New York High (2023)

=== Singles ===
- All Roads (Lead Back to You) (1976)
- One of These Days (1977)
- Here's Some Love (1978)
- I Only Want What's Mine (1980)

== Personal life ==
Most married actress Morgan Hart (daughter of burlesque queen Margaret Hart Ferraro) in 1982. They have two daughters and live near Mead, Colorado, north of Denver.

=== Happy Days lawsuit ===
On April 19, 2011, Most and four of his Happy Days co-stars, Erin Moran, Marion Ross, Anson Williams and the estate of Tom Bosley, who died in 2010, filed a $10 million breach-of-contract lawsuit against CBS, which owns the show, claiming they had not been paid for merchandising revenues owed under their contracts. The cast members claimed they had not received revenues from show-related items, including comic books, T-shirts, scrapbooks, trading cards, games, lunch boxes, dolls, toy cars, magnets, greeting cards, and DVDs where their images appear on the box covers. Under their contracts, they were supposed to be paid five percent from the net proceeds of merchandising if their sole image were used, and half that amount if they were in a group. CBS said it owed the actors $8,500 and $9,000 each, most of it from slot machine revenues, but the group said they were owed millions. The lawsuit was initiated after Ross was informed by a friend playing slots at a casino of a "Happy Days" machine on which players win the jackpot when five Marion Rosses are rolled.

In October 2011, a judge rejected the group's fraud claim, which meant they could not receive millions of dollars in potential damages. On June 5, 2012, a judge denied a motion filed by CBS to have the case thrown out, which meant it would go to trial on July 17 if the matter was not settled by then. In July 2012, the actors settled their lawsuit with CBS. Each received a payment of $65,000 and a promise by CBS to continue honoring the terms of their contracts.

== Filmography ==
=== Film ===
Year	Title	Role	Notes
1975	Crazy Mama	Shawn (as Donn Most)	action comedy film
1980	Leo and Loree	Leo	romance comedy film
1986	Stewardess School	George Bunkle (as Donald Most)	action comedy film
1993	Acting on Impulse	Leroy	
1995	Hourglass	Andre	
1996	Pure Danger	Parole Officer (uncredited)	
1999	EDtv	Benson	
2005	Planting Melvin		
2008	The Great Buck Howard	Tonight Show Producer	
2008	Finding Madison	Jacob Gray	
2009	The Yankles	Frankie Dubs	
2009	Take 2	Billy	
2010	Bones	Mr. Reeves	
2015	Duality	Kyle	
2015	Follow	Mr. Reynolds	
2023	Far Haven	Chester Tilley	
2024	Unsung Hero	Pierce	

=== Television ===
Year	Title	Role	Notes
1973	Emergency!	Fred Wilson (as Donny Most)	Episode: "Computer Error"
1974	Police Story	Arthur Kane (as Donny Most)	Episode: "Explosion"
1974	Room 222	Louie (as Donny Most)	Episode: "Jason and Big Mo"
1974-1983	Happy Days	Ralph Malph (as Donny Most)	167 episodes
1975	Huckleberry	Tom Sawyer (as Donny Most)	Television film
1976	Petrocelli	Will Johnson (as Donny Most)	Episode: "The Pay Off"
1978	With This Ring	James Cutler (as Donny Most)	Television film
1978	ABC Weekend Specials	Henry Cooper	Episode: "The $100,000 Bill"
1979	Greatest Heroes of the Bible	Daniel (as Donny Most)	Episode: "Daniel and Nebuchadnezzar"
1979	Angie	Coffee shop customer (uncredited)	Episode: "The Adjustment"
1979-1983	The Love Boat	Marv Prine (as Donny Most) Keith Kelly (as Donald Most)	Episode: "Alaska Wedding Cruise: Buddy and Portia's Story / Julie's Story / Carol and Doug's Story / Peter and Alicia's Story: Part 1"; Episode: "Alaska Wedding Cruise: Buddy and Portia's Story / Julie's Story / Carol and Doug's Story / Peter and Alicia's Story: Part 2"; Episode: "The Family Plan / The Promoter / May the Best Man Win / Forever Engaged / The Judges: Part 1"; Episode: "The Family Plan / The Promoter / May the Best Man Win / Forever Engaged / The Judges: Part 2"; Episode: "The Zinging Valentine / The Very Temporary Secretary / Final Score"
1981	Aloha Paradise	Lurp (as Donny Most)	Episode: "Sydney's Old Flame / Everett and The Wolf / Lurp's in Love
1980-1981	The Fonz and the Happy Days Gang	Ralph Malph (voice)	Main role
1981-1982	Fantasy Island	Kermit Dobbs; Todd Porter, Billy Williams	Episode: "The Artist and the Lady / Elizabeth's Baby; Episode: "King Arthur in Mr. Roarke's Court / Shadow Games"
1982	CHiPs	Moloch (as Donald Most)	Episode: "Rock Devil Rock"
1984	Masquerade	Dooley (as Donald Most)	Episode: "The French Correction"
1983-1985	Dungeons & Dragons	Eric the Cavalier (voice) (as Donald Most)	27 episodes
1986	Murder, She Wrote	T.J. Holt (as Donald Most)	Episode: "Stage Struck"
1986-1987	Teen Wolf	Stiles (voice) (as Donald Most)	21 episodes
1989	The Munsters Today	Barney Morley	Episode: "McMunsters"
1989	Hagar the Horrible	Lute / Instructor (voice) (as Donny Most)	TV Short
1989	Charles in Charge	Lottery Winner	Episode: "It's a Blunderfull Life"
1990	Murder, She Wrote	Ozzie Gerson	Episode: "The Big Show of 1965"
1990	Shades of LA	Smitts	Episode: "Big Brother Is Watching"
1991	The New Lassie	Fred	Episode: "Kitty Saver"
1993	Baywatch	Roger Clark	Episode: "Submersion"
1996	Dead Man's Island	Burton Andrews	TV film
1996	Sliders	Skip Collins	Episode: "Dead Man Sliding"
1997	Dark Skies	Timothy Leary	Episode: "Bloodlines"
1997	MADtv	Peter Pippen	1 episode
1998	Diagnosis: Murder	Emerson Horn	Episode: "Food Fight"
1998-1999	The Crow: Stairway to Heaven	Dr. John Dorsett	Episode: "Before I Wake"; Episode: "Lazarus Rising"
2000	Yes, Dear	Professor Rhodes	Episode: "Talk Time"
2001	Star Trek: Voyager	Kadan	Episode: "Workforce"; Episode: "Workforce, Part II"
2003	Sabrina, the Teenage Witch	The White Rabbit	Episode: "Sabrina in Wonderland"
2004	Century City	Pudge McNeil	Episode: "To Know Her"
2007	Family Guy	(voice) (as Donny Most)	Episode: "It Takes a Village Idiot, and I Married One"
2010	Men of a Certain Age	Charles	Episode: "The Bad Guy"
2013	Glee	Rusty Pillsbury	Episode: "Asian F"; Episode: "Yes/No"; Episode: "Girls (and Boys) on Film"
2016	The Odd Couple	Fred	Episode: "Taffy Days"
