= Free Land =

Free Land may refer to:

- Free Land (novel), a novel by Rose Wilder Lane
- Free Land (film), a 1946 German drama film
- Free Land (newspaper), a Hungarian newspaper

== See also ==
- Freeland (disambiguation)
