= Charles Tyner =

American actor (1923–2017)

- Born: June 8, 1923; Danville, Virginia, U.S.
- Died: November 8, 2017 (aged 94)
- Occupation: Actor
- Years active: 1957–2014

Charles Tyner (June 8, 1923 – November 8, 2017) was an American film, television, and stage character actor known principally for his performances in the films Cool Hand Luke (1967), Harold and Maude (1971), The Cowboys (1972), Emperor of the North Pole (1973), The Longest Yard (1974), Pete's Dragon (1977), Hamburger: The Motion Picture (1986), Planes, Trains and Automobiles (1987), and Pulse (1988).

== Early life ==
Tyner was a native of Danville, Virginia and served in the United States Army as a combat infantryman in France and Germany during World War II.

== Performing ==
In 1957, Tyner made his debut on Broadway in Orpheus Descending. In 1959, he appeared with Paul Newman in Sweet Bird of Youth on Broadway.

During 1959, Tyner had his film debut with an uncredited part in That Kind of Woman. He worked with Newman again in 1967 as Boss Higgins, the sadistic prison guard in Cool Hand Luke and became a regular character actor, appearing in films including The Reivers, Lawman, Harold and Maude, The Cowboys, The Outlaw Josey Wales, and Emperor of the North Pole. One of Tyner's better known roles was opposite Burt Reynolds in the 1974 prison comedy The Longest Yard. Other roles included the evil Howard Rodman in the television series Father Murphy and Gus, the motel owner in Planes, Trains and Automobiles.

Tyner returned to the stage in 1977 but continued to appear in films and frequently act on television. Tyner's last onscreen appearance was in the 2014 independent short film Lucidia. He died on November 8, 2017.

== Filmography ==
- That Kind of Woman (1959) as Young Sharecropper, Father (uncredited)
- Fail Safe (1964) as Jet Fighter Pilot (voice, uncredited)
- Lilith (1964) as Patient (uncredited)
- Cool Hand Luke (1967) as Boss Higgins
- The Stalking Moon (1968) - Dace
- The Sound of Anger (1968) as Rudolph Evans (uncredited)
- Gaily, Gaily (1969) as Dr. Lazarus
- The Reivers (1969) as Edmonds
- The Cheyenne Social Club (1970) as Charlie Bannister
- The Moonshine War (1970) as Mr. McClendon
- The Traveling Executioner (1970) as Virgil
- Monte Walsh (1970) as Doctor
- Sometimes a Great Notion (1970) as Les Gibbons
- Lawman (1971) as Minister
- Harold and Maude (1971) as Uncle Victor
- The Cowboys (1972) as Stonemason
- Jeremiah Johnson (1972) as Robidoux
- Fuzz (1972) as Pete Schroeder
- Bad Company (1972) as Egg Farmer
- Emperor of the North Pole (aka Emperor of the North) (1973) as Cracker
- The Stone Killer (1973) as Police Psychiatrist
- The Midnight Man (1974) as Ewing
- Winter Kill (1974) as Charley Eastman
- The Longest Yard (1974) as Unger
- The Greatest Gift (1974) as Amos Goodloe
- Young Pioneers (1976) as Mr. Beaton
- Family Plot (1976) as Wheeler
- Rich Man, Poor Man (1976) as Matusik
- The Outlaw Josey Wales (1976) as Zukie Limmer
- Pete's Dragon (1977) as Merle Gogan
- Peter Lundy and the Medicine Hat Stallion (1977) as Lefty Slade
- The Awakening Land (1978) as Reverend Hutchins
- Lassie: A New Beginning (1978) as Asa Bluel
- The Incredible Journey of Doctor Meg Laurel (1979) as Doug Slocumb
- Shadow of Fear (1979) as Hans
- Young Guy Christian (1979) as Doctor Gasss
- A Matter of Life and Death (1981) as Joy's Father
- Evilspeak (1981) as Colonel Kincaid
- Deadly Messages (1985) as George Clark
- Space (1985) as "Dracula"
- Hamburger: The Motion Picture (1986) as Lyman Vunk
- Best Seller (1987) as Cleve's Father
- Planes, Trains and Automobiles (1987) as Gus Mooney
- Pulse (1988) as Old Man Holger
- I'll Be Home for Christmas (1988) as Isaiah Cawley
- Enid Is Sleeping (1990) as Man at Indian Burial Site
- Pastime (1990) as Arnold
- Motorama (1991) as Dying Man
- Hart to Hart: Home Is Where the Hart Is (1994) as Mechanic
- Lucidia (2014) as Father Gordon (final film role)

== Television series ==
- Danger (1951) – 2 episodes
- The DuPont Show of the Month: "Ethan Frome" (1960) as Jotham Powell – 1 episode
- The United States Steel Hour: "Shadow of a Pale Horse" (1960) as Weatherby – 1 episode
- NBC Sunday Showcase: "The Sacco-Vanzetti Story" (1960) as Clerk – 2 episodes
- Naked City (1961, 1962, 1963) as Hotel Manager (uncredited) / Veyo / Jerome "Apples" Seidner – 3 episodes
- The Defenders (1962) as Captain MacDonald – 1 episode
- Hawk (1966) as Drunk – 1 episode
- Dundee and the Culhane (1967) as Guilfoyle – 1 episode
- The Big Valley (1967) as Hemit – 1 episode
- The High Chaparral (1969) as Gregg – 1 episode
- Sarge (1971) as Hawley – 1 episode
- Alias Smith and Jones (1971) as Turner – 1 episode
- Kung Fu (1973) as Larraby – 1 episode
- The Waltons (1973) as Graham Foster – 1 episode
- Mannix (1973) as Jonah – 1 episode
- The Manhunter (1974) as Joshua Grant – 1 episode
- McCloud (1975) as William Lang – 1 episode
- City of Angels (1976) as Undertaker – 1 episode
- Charlie's Angels (1977) as Anton Tarloff – 1 episode
- The Young Pioneers (1978) as Mr. Beaton – 1 episode
- Family (1979) as Mr. Chadway – 1 episode
- How the West Was Won (1979) as Eli Kelsay – 1 episode
- Barnaby Jones (1979) as Sam Finney – 2 episodes
- The Dukes of Hazzard (1980) as Claude Billings – 1 episode
- Father Murphy (1981-1982) as Mr. Howard Rodman – 10 episodes
- The Incredible Hulk (1982) as Roy Darnell – 1 episode
- Little House on the Prairie (1983) as Mr. Janes – 2 episodes
- AfterMASH (1983) as Rivers – 1 episode
- St. Elsewhere (1984) as Christopher Samus Payne – 1 episode
- The Jeffersons (1984) as Bellboy – 1 episode
- Highway to Heaven (1984) as Caleb Fish – 1 episode
- Hill Street Blues (1985) as Al DiPiano – 2 episodes
- Riptide (1986) as Building Manager – 1 episode
- Dallas (1988) as Bovay – 1 episode
- Paradise (1988) as Herb Applegate – 2 episodes
- The Wonder Years (1990, 1991) as Mr. Nestor – 2 episodes
- Matlock (1992) as E.J. Metcalf – 1 episode
- On the Air (1992) as Professor R. Answer – 1 episode
- ER (1999) as Barry Connelly – 1 episode
- Diagnosis Murder (2001) as Harry Clark (final TV role) – 1 episode
- 18th Screen Actors Guild Awards (2018) as Self / "In Memoriam" – 1 episode

== Selected theater credits ==
- Johnny Johnson, playing "The Village Editor" / "Dr. McBray" / "An American Brigadier General" / "An Attendant", Carnegie Hall Playhouse, New York City – 1956
- Orpheus Descending, playing "2nd Man", Martin Beck Theatre, New York City – 1957
- Under Milk Wood, playing "Third Drowned" / "Evans the Death" / "Organ Morgan", Henry Miller's Theatre, New York City – 1957
- Sweet Bird of Youth, playing "The Heckler", Martin Beck Theatre, New York City – 1959-1960
- The Moon Besieged, playing "John Brown", Lyceum Theatre, New York City, NY – 1962
- One Flew Over the Cuckoo's Nest, playing "Sefelt", Cort Theatre, New York City – 1963-1964
- Our Town, playing "Howie Newsome", Equity Library Theatre, New York City; Eugene O'Neill Theater Center, Waterford, Connecticut

== Accolades ==
- The Cowboys — Winner — Western Heritage Award (1972)
