= Michael O'Herlihy =

Television and film director, television producer

- Born: 1 April 1928; Dublin, Ireland
- Died: 16 June 1997 (aged 69); Dublin, Ireland
- Occupations: Irish television producer and director
- Spouse: Elizabeth Ryan
- Children: 4

Michael O'Herlihy (1 April 1929 – 16 June 1997) was an Irish television producer and director who directed shows like Gunsmoke (1955), Maverick (1957), Star Trek (1965), Hawaii Five-O (1968), M*A*S*H (1972) and The A-Team (1983).

Born in Dublin, Ireland, O'Herlihy was the younger brother of actor Dan O'Herlihy. He died in Dublin, on 16 June 1997 at age 69.

== Filmography ==
=== Director ===
- The Fighting Prince of Donegal (1966)
- The One and Only, Genuine, Original Family Band (1968)
- Smith! (1969)

==== Television ====
- Bronco (1 episode, 1961)
- Surfside 6 (3 episodes, 1961)
- Maverick 3 episodes, 1961–1962)
- 77 Sunset Strip (4 episodes, 1961–1962)
- The Lieutenant (1 episode, 1963)
- The Richard Boone Show (1 episode, 1964)
- Profiles in Courage (1 episode, 1964)
- The Man from U.N.C.L.E. (1 episode, 1964)
- Kraft Suspense Theatre (1 episode, 1964)
- Mr. Novak (11 episodes, 1963–1965)
- Rawhide (5 episodes, 1964–1965)
- Star Trek (1 episode, 1967)
- The Guns of Will Sonnett (2 episodes, 1968)
- Mission: Impossible (3 episodes, 1967–1968)
- The Young Loner (1968)
- The Outcasts (1 episode, 1968)
- It Takes a Thief (1 episode, 1969)
- Judd, for the Defense (1 episode, 1969)
- Then Came Bronson (1 episode, 1969)
- The F.B.I. (1 episode, 1970)
- The Interns (1 episode, 1970)
- The Wonderful World of Disney (6 episodes, 1967–1972)
- Cade's County (1 episode, 1972)
- Anna and the King (1 episode, 1972)
- M*A*S*H (1 episode, 1972)
- Deadly Harvest (1972)
- Cannon (2 episodes, 1972)
- Mannix (3 episodes, 1968–1973)
- The Streets of San Francisco (1 episode, 1973)
- The New Adventures of Perry Mason (2 episodes, 1973–1974)
- Evel Knievel (1974)
- Gunsmoke (4 episodes, 1964–1974)
- Young Pioneers (1976)
- Young Pioneers' Christmas (1976)
- Kiss Me, Kill Me (1976)
- Hawaii Five-O (24 episodes, 1969–1976)
- Police Story (6 episodes, 1975–1977)
- Man from Atlantis (1 episode, 1977)
- Peter Lundy and the Medicine Hat Stallion (1977)
- Logan's Run (1 episode, 1978)
- Backstairs at the White House (1979)
- The Flame Is Love (1979)
- Dallas Cowboys Cheerleaders II (1980)
- Detour to Terror (1980)
- The Great Cash Giveaway Getaway (1980)
- Cry of the Innocent (1980)
- Desperate Voyage (1980)
- A Time for Miracles (1980)
- Nero Wolfe (1 episode, 1981)
- The Million Dollar Face (1981)
- McClain's Law (1 episode, 1981)
- Bret Maverick (1 episode, 1982)
- Seven Brides for Seven Brothers (Unknown episodes, 1982–1983)
- Magnum, P.I. (1 episode, 1983)
- I Married Wyatt Earp (1983)
- The Fall Guy (9 episodes, 1982–1984)
- Riptide (Unknown episodes)
- Trapper John, M.D. (1 episode, 1984)
- Two by Forsyth (1984)
- Crazy Like a Fox (Unknown episodes)
- The Equalizer (Unknown episodes)
- Miami Vice (1 episode, 1985)
- The A-Team (20 episodes, 1984–1986)
- Matlock (1 episode, 1987)
- Hoover vs. the Kennedys: The Second Civil War (1987)
- Hunter (2 episodes, 1985–1988)

=== Producer ===
- Backstairs at the White House (1979)
- The Flame Is Love (1979)
- Cry of the Innocent (1980)

== Award nominations ==
Year	Result	Award	Category	Film or series
1979	Nominated	Emmy Award	Outstanding Limited Series	Backstairs at the White House (Shared with Ed Friendly)
1988	Nominated	Gemini Awards	Best Direction in a Dramatic Program or Mini-Series	Hoover vs. the Kennedys: The Second Civil War
