= I'll Be Home for Christmas (1988 film) =

1988 television film by Marvin J. Chomsky

- Genre: Drama
- Written by: Blanche Hanalis
- Directed by: Marvin J. Chomsky
- Starring: Hal Holbrook; Eva Marie Saint; Courteney Cox; Nancy Travis; Peter Gallagher; Whip Hubley; Charles Tyner
- Music by: Jorge Calandrelli
- Country of origin: United States
- Original language: English

Production
- Executive producer: Michael Manheim
- Producer: Marvin J. Chomsky
- Production location: Rockport, Massachusetts
- Cinematography: Paul Lohmann
- Editor: William B. Stich
- Running time: 96 minutes
- Production company: NBC Productions

Original release
- Network: NBC
- Release: December 12, 1988

I'll Be Home for Christmas is a 1988 American made-for-television Christmas drama film directed and produced by Marvin J. Chomsky. The film, which stars Hal Holbrook and Eva Marie Saint, deals with the lives and relationships of a Massachusetts family during the final Christmas of World War II. The film would go on to win a Primetime Emmy Award for Outstanding Art Direction for a Miniseries or a Special.

== Plot ==
Set in 1944 Rockport, Massachusetts during the final moments of World War II, I'll Be Home for Christmas focuses on the Bundy family. Head of the family Joseph (Hal Holbrook) and his wife Martha (Eva Marie Saint) await the return of their grown children, who include Mike (Whip Hubley), who has completed all of his combat missions in England and is due to come home for good. His pregnant wife Nora (Courteney Cox) has been living with the Bundys since his departure, and is now awaiting her husband's return while preparing to give birth to their first child, hoping it won't be born until Mike arrives. She eventually gives birth to a baby boy.

Mike's younger brother Terrel (Jason Oliver) is currently in between boot camp and an overseas assignment, and has been at odds with his father his entire life. Meanwhile, the family's only daughter Leah (Nancy Travis) is on a bus home to Rockport, shortly after the violent death of her fiance, when she meets soldier Aaron Copler (Peter Gallagher), who has nowhere else to go for the holidays. They feel attracted to each other, which leads to an invite for Aaron to spend Christmas with the Bundy clan.

Completing the family portrait is 13-year-old Davey (David Moscow), the youngest son who hopes for the war to last for years until he is old enough to experience the action. Another character dominant in the story is Isaiah Cawley (Charles Tyner), a man of the Western Union who delivers telegrams informing people of their loved ones lost overseas.

In a sub-plot regarding Joseph and Martha, the couple stretch their savings and ration stamps to obtain the best trimmings for Christmas dinner.

== Cast ==
- Hal Holbrook as Joseph Bundy
- Eva Marie Saint as Martha Bundy
- Nancy Travis as Leah Bundy
- Peter Gallagher as Aaron Copler
- Jason Oliver as Terrel Bundy
- David Moscow as Davey Bundy
- Courteney Cox as Nora Bundy
- Whip Hubley as Mike Bundy
- Charles Tyner as Isaiah Cawley

== Production ==
The film went in production as A Rockport Christmas, and by April 1988, Hal Holbrook, Eva Marie Saint, Courteney Cox and Peter Gallagher were among the official cast members. Saint was appealed to her role by recognizing "the bit of selfless America I hope people don't lose sight of" in the Bundys, along with the film's emphasis on family. With Rockport rebuilt to a 1940s-looking village, Saint claimed that the townspeople were amazed with the sets.

The film's premiere took place in Rockport, Massachusetts, and was attended by Saint, in the weekend before its first television airing. Describing the premiere, Saint expressed her content in an interview: "It was beautiful, like the Winslow Homer woodcuts of Gloucester. They had a dinner at the high school and the showing in the gym. Girls in the sophomore class served dinner and the president of the class presented me with flowers. You had the feeling the school was a hub of life, as it was when I was growing up."

== Reception ==
I'll Be Home for Christmas received mixed to negative reviews. A reviewer for The Washington Post praised the early 1940s touches, though calling the story "sentimental and a bit predictable". More negative was reviewer Faye Zuckerman, who wrote: "The much-anticipated NBC movie is a holiday special to delete from your must-see list. Early on the movie becomes sentimental and heavy-handed, rivaling the most overdone moments on primetime's slushy-sudsers Dynasty and Knots Landing. She furthermore criticized Courteney Cox's "overdone emoting", which is "contrasted by Holbrook and Saint's lackluster performances here. Both usually give credibility and strength to movies with such weak scripts. In this case they barely manage to muster enough energy to appear interested in their roles."

== See also ==
- List of Christmas films
