= Freedland =

Freedland is a surname. Notable people with the surname include:

- Jonathan Freedland (born 1967), English journalist and author
- Mark Freedland, English professor of employment law and author
- Michael Freedland (1934–2018), British journalist, biographer, and broadcaster

== See also ==
- Freeland (surname)
