= Body Language (1992 film) =

- VHS cover
- Genre: Thriller
- Teleplay by: Dan Gurskis; Brian Ross
- Story by: Dan Gurskis
- Directed by: Arthur Allan Seidelman
- Starring: Heather Locklear; Linda Purl
- Music by: Misha Segal
- Country of origin: United States
- Original language: English

Production
- Executive producer: Dan Gurskis
- Producer: Robert M. Rolsky
- Cinematography: Hanania Baer
- Editor: Bert Glatstein
- Running time: 93 minutes
- Production company: Wilshire Court Productions

Original release
- Network: USA Network
- Release: July 15, 1992

Body Language is a 1992 American thriller television film directed by Arthur Allan Seidelman and written by Dan Gurskis and Brian Ross. The film, starring Heather Locklear as a successful business executive and Linda Purl as her assistant who is trying to take over her life, aired on the USA Network on July 15, 1992.

== Cast ==
- Heather Locklear as Betsy Frieze
- Linda Purl as Norma Suffield
- James Acheson as Victor
- Edward Albert as Charles Stella

== Production ==
The film was shot in Portland, Oregon.

== Reception ==
The New York Times wrote: "With two screenwriters, you'd think that the producers could have come up with something less contrived and cliched."
