= The Mainspring of Human Progress =

Book by Henry Grady Weaver

- First edition
- Author: Henry Grady Weaver
- Publisher: Talbot Books
- Publication date: 1947

The Mainspring of Human Progress, by Henry Grady Weaver, is a libertarian history book published in 1947 by Talbot Books. In 1953, the Foundation for Economic Education printed a revised edition and has done all subsequent printings. The book is an adaptation of the 1943 Rose Wilder Lane book The Discovery of Freedom, rewritten by Weaver.

== Relation to The Discovery of Freedom ==
Rose Wilder Lane's book The Discovery of Freedom: Man's Struggle Against Authority was printed in 1943. It received good reviews, notably from Albert Jay Nock, but Lane was dissatisfied with it and would not give permission to reprint it. Only one thousand copies were printed in her lifetime. The continuing interest in her book prompted Weaver to produce his adaptation.

Weaver felt that "certain important, but lesser known books, deserved to be rewritten, brought up-to-date and published in streamlined editions for people who don't have much time to read." He characterized his work as both a "condensation" and an "amplification" of Lane's, writing: "I've tried to retell her story in my own way, making liberal use of her material—plus ideas growing out of personal experiences and gathered from various sources."

In The Modern Library's readers poll of the 100 best nonfiction books (conducted 4/29/1999 through 9/30/1999), The Mainspring of Human Progress was ranked #48 and The Discovery of Freedom was #67.
