= Peter Lundy and the Medicine Hat Stallion =

1977 Television film directed by Michael O'Herlihy

- Directed by: Michael O'Herlihy
- Screenplay by: Jack Turley
- Based on: San Domingo, The Medicine Hat Stallion (1972 novel) by Marguerite Henry
- Produced by: Ed Friendly (producer & executive producer)
- Starring: Leif Garrett; Milo O'Shea; Bibi Besch; John Quade; Ann Doran
- Cinematography: Robert L. Morrison
- Edited by: Paul LaMastra
- Music by: Morton Stevens
- Production companies: NBC Productions; Ed Friendly Productions
- Distributed by: NBC (original broadcast); GoodTimes Home Video (VHS, 1977)
- Release date: November 6, 1977 (broadcast date)
- Running time: 85 minutes
- Country: United States
- Language: English

Peter Lundy and the Medicine Hat Stallion is a made-for-TV movie starring Leif Garrett, Milo O'Shea, Bibi Besch, John Quade, and Ann Doran which aired November 6, 1977, on NBC. Brad Rearden, Mitchell Ryan, John Anderson, Charles Tyner, Ned Romero, Jimmy Lydon, Phil Mead, Bill Hicks, and Robert Tzudiker have supporting roles.

The film is based on the novel San Domingo, The Medicine Hat Stallion by Newbery Medal award winner Marguerite Henry. The film was developed and produced by Ed Friendly and directed by Michael O'Herlihy from a teleplay by Jack Turley. In 1978 Peter Lundy was awarded the Bronze Wrangler for Outstanding Western Fictional Television Program by the National Cowboy & Western Heritage Museum.

== Plot ==
Peter Lundy is a 15-year-old boy growing up in pre-Civil War Nebraska Territory with his father Jethro, mother Emily, and Grandma Lundy. Peter resents the tyrannical way his father treats him and hates the bleak life at their prairie trading post. He raises a foal that was left at the trading post as a payment until it becomes old enough to ride. Peter and his horse then win a job with the Pony Express to carry correspondence and messages between the East and West coasts. It is a rough, hard, and dangerous job but Peter learns what he is made of and earns the respect of his father.

== Cast ==
- Leif Garrett as Peter Lundy
- Milo O'Shea as Brisly
- Bibi Besch as Emily Lundy
- John Quade as Adam
- Ann Doran as Grandma Lundy
- Brad Rearden as Jim Baxter
- Mitchell Ryan as Jethro Lundy
- John Anderson as Alexander Majors
- Charles Tyner as Lefty Slade
- Ned Romero as Red Cloud
- Jimmy Lydon as Muggeridge
- Phil Mead as Hugo Rummelholf
- Bill Hicks as Bolivar Roberts
- Robert Tzudiker as Pee Wee

== Production ==
Peter Lundy and the Medicine Hat Stallion was filmed in New Mexico.

== Ratings ==
Peter Lundy and the Medicine Hat Stallion tied for 442nd with the deciding sixth game of the NBA Finals.

== Awards ==
Won

- Western Heritage Awards Bronze Wrangler (1978) for Fictional Television Drama - Film/Television
  - Ed Friendly (producer)
  - Michael O'Herlihy (director)
  - Jack Turley (writer)
  - Leif Garrett (actor)
  - Milo O'Shea (actor)

Nomination

- Primetime Emmy Awards (1978)
  - Outstanding Children's Special – Ed Friendly (producer)

Other awards

- Film Advisory Board Award of Excellence
- Southern California Motion Picture Council Golden Halo
- American Humane Society Award for outstanding contribution to the production of a motion picture with animals.

== See also ==
- Justin Morgan Had a Horse (1972 film)
