= Henry Grady Weaver =

American writer (1889–1949)

Henry Grady Weaver (December 24, 1889 – January 3, 1949) was the director of Customer Research Staff for General Motors Corporation, and shown on the cover of the November 14, 1938 issue of Time magazine. He is credited with developing the use of the survey questionnaire to investigate customer preferences for design features in cars.

== Early life and education ==
He was born in Eatonton, Georgia, and obtained his Bachelor of Science from Georgia Tech in 1911. He was named after, but not related to, the Southern orater Henry Woodfin Grady who died the day before Weaver was born. He was nicknamed Buck Weaver after the baseball player of the same name who later was part of the 1919 Black Sox scandal.

== Career ==
Blind in his right eye since birth, he worked as a mechanic, salesman and draftsman before becoming director of Customer Research Staff of General Motors Corporation. It was for that work that he was placed on the cover of the November 14, 1938, issue of Time.

He is best known for his work, The Mainspring of Human Progress.
