= Robert Hays =

American actor (born 1947)

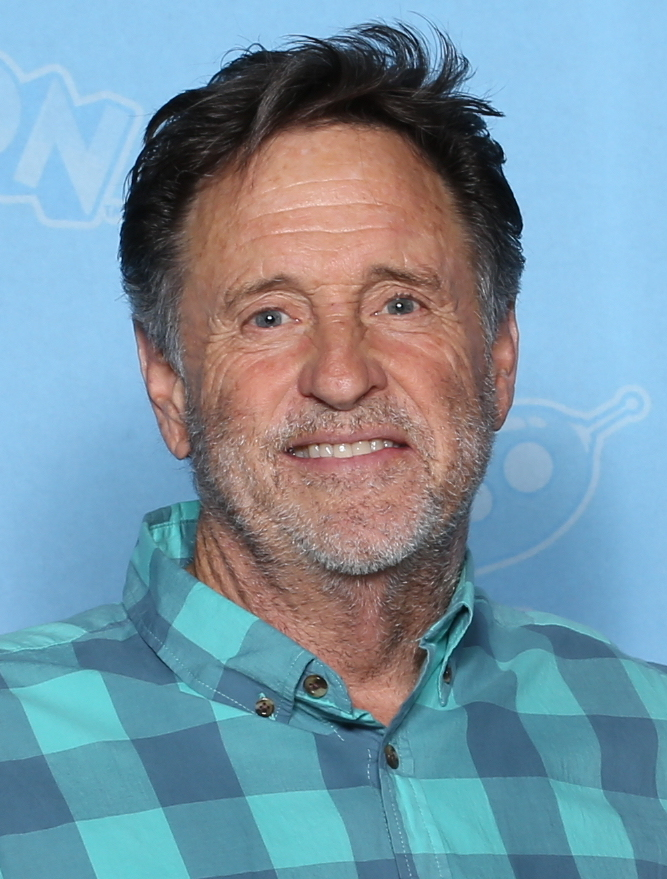
- Hays at GalaxyCon Richmond in 2019
- Born: July 24, 1947 (age 79); Bethesda, Maryland, U.S.
- Occupations: Actor; producer; director
- Years active: 1975–present
- Spouse: Cherie Currie (m. 1990; div. 1997)
- Children: 1

Robert Hays (born July 24, 1947) is an American actor, known for a variety of television and film roles since the 1970s. He came to prominence around 1980, co-starring in the two-season domestic sitcom Angie, and playing the central role of pilot Ted Striker in the comedy film Airplane! and its sequel. Other film roles include the lead role in the comedy Take This Job and Shove It (1981), and Bob Seaver, one of the main human characters in Homeward Bound: The Incredible Journey (1993). On television, he starred in the science fiction series Starman (1986–1987) and the short-lived workplace sitcom FM (1989–1990), voiced Iron Man in Iron Man (1994), and had a guest role as Bud Hyde on That '70s Show (2000).

== Career ==
In 1977, Hays played a military corporal in an episode of the television series Wonder Woman. He starred in several short-lived television series, including the 1978 production The Young Pioneers on ABC; the 1979–1980 series Angie; Starman (1986–1987), and FM (1989–1990).

He was cast as Ted Striker, the washed-up pilot who needs to save the day in Airplane! (1980), a spoof of disaster films such as the Airport series, and returned for Airplane II: The Sequel (1982). His other films include the lead role in the comedy Take This Job and Shove It (1981) and a role in the horror anthology film Cat's Eye (1985). In 1981, he hosted the sketch comedy television series Saturday Night Live. He played Bob Seaver in Homeward Bound: The Incredible Journey (1993), and Homeward Bound II: Lost in San Francisco (1996). He played a man thought to be Hyde's dad in several episodes of That '70s Show.

He has performed in many television films and done voice work, such as the title character in the 1994 TV series adaptation of Marvel Comics' Iron Man. In 2013, Hays appeared in a slapstick-laden TV spot promoting tourism in Wisconsin, which also reunited him with Airplane! co-director David Zucker. Hays and Zucker also reunited for the 2008 superhero parody Superhero Movie, which also featured Hays' Airplane! co-star Leslie Nielsen.

== Personal life ==
Hays was married to musician and singer Cherie Currie. The couple has a son, Jake. Hays and Currie divorced in 1997 after seven years of marriage.

== Filmography ==
=== Film ===
| Year | Title | Role | Notes |
|---|---|---|---|
| 1980 | Airplane! | Ted Striker | Alternative title: Flying High! |
| 1981 | Take This Job and Shove It | Frank Macklin | |
| 1982 | Airplane II: The Sequel | Ted Striker | Alternative title: Flying High II: The Sequel |
| 1983 | Trenchcoat | Terry Leonard | |
| 1983 | Utilities | Bob Hunt | |
| 1983 | Touched | Daniel | |
| 1984 | Scandalous | Frank Swedlin | |
| 1985 | Cat's Eye | Johnny Norris | Alternative title: Stephen King's Cat's Eye |
| 1989 | Honeymoon Academy | Sean Mcdonald | Alternative title: For Better or For Worse |
| 1992 | Fifty/Fifty | Sam French | |
| 1993 | Homeward Bound: The Incredible Journey | Bob Seaver | |
| 1993 | Partners | Grave Squad Lawyer | Short film |
| 1994 | Raw Justice | Mitch McCullum | Alternative titles: Good Cop, Bad Cop and Strip Girl |
| 1994 | No Dessert, Dad, till You Mow the Lawn | Ken Cochran | |
| 1995 | Cyber Bandits | Morgan | |
| 1996 | Homeward Bound II: Lost in San Francisco | Bob Seaver | |
| 1999 | An American Tail: The Mystery of the Night Monster | Reed Daley | Voice |
| 2000 | Dr. T & the Women | Harlan | |
| 2001 | Sex and a Girl | Dan | Alternative title: Alex in Wonder |
| 2001 | The Retrievers | Tom Lowry | |
| 2004 | The Nutcracker and the Mouse King | Squeak | Voice, English dub |
| 2005 | Freezerburn | Michael Reed the Talent | |
| 2007 | Universal Remote | Dr. Anderson | |
| 2007 | Nicky's Birthday Camera | Bob | |
| 2008 | Superhero Movie | Blaine Riker | |
| 2013 | Paranormal Movie | Director | |
| 2016 | Miracle in the Valley | Pastor Reign | |

=== Television ===
| Year | Title | Role | Notes |
|---|---|---|---|
| 1975 | The Rockford Files | Darren Weeks | Episode: "The Deep Blue Sleep" |
| 1975 | Marcus Welby, M.D. | Officer Gilpin / Officer Hanson | 3 episodes |
| 1976 | The Streets of San Francisco | Lester | Episode: "Judgment Day" |
| 1976 | Cannon | Michael Narak | Episode: "Bloodlines" |
| 1976 | Young Pioneers | Dan Gray | Television film |
| 1976 | Laverne & Shirley | Tom | Episode: "Dating Slump" |
| 1976 | The Blue Knight | Officer Wells | 4 episodes |
| 1976 | Spencer's Pilots | Jack | Episode: "The Hitchhiker" |
| 1976 | Most Wanted | Bruce Collins | Episode: "The Heisman Killer" |
| 1976 | Young Pioneers' Christmas | Dan Gray | Television film |
| 1977 | Wonder Woman | Corporal Jim Ames | Episode: "Wonder Woman in Hollywood" |
| 1977 | Delta County, U.S.A. | Bo | Television film |
| 1978 | The Love Boat | Sam Bradley | Episode: "Family Reunion" |
| 1978 | The Initiation of Sarah | Scott Rafferty | Television film |
| 1978 | The Young Pioneers | Dan Gray | Miniseries |
| 1978 | Almost Heaven | Dave Leland | Television film |
| 1978 | Will Rogers: Champion of the People | Will Rogers | TV special |
| 1979 | The Fall of the House of Usher | Jonathan Cresswell | Television film |
| 1979–1980 | Angie | Brad Benson | 36 episodes |
| 1979 | Battle of the Network Stars VII | Himself | TV special |
| 1980 | Battle of the Network Stars VIII | Himself | TV special |
| 1980 | The Girl, the Gold Watch & Everything | Kirby Winter | Television film |
| 1981 | Saturday Night Live | Himself / Host | Episode: "Robert Hays/14 Karat Soul/King Carrasco & The Crowns" |
| 1981 | California Gold Rush | Bret Harte / Narrator | Television film |
| 1982 | The Day the Bubble Burst | Gregory Winslow | Television film |
| 1984 | Mister Roberts | Lieutenant Douglas Roberts | Television film |
| 1986–87 | Starman | Paul Forrester | 22 episodes |
| 1987 | Murder by the Book | D.H. Mercer / Biff Deegan | Television film |
| 1989–90 | FM | Ted Costas | 13 episodes |
| 1990 | Running Against Time | David Rhodes | Television film |
| 1992 | The Larry Sanders Show | Himself | Episode: "The Garden Weasel" |
| 1992 | Hot Chocolate | Eric Ferrier | Television film |
| 1993 | Cutters | Joe Polachek | 5 episodes |
| 1993 | Sex, Shock and Censorship in the '90s | Martin Day | TV special |
| 1994–96 | Iron Man | Tony Stark / Iron Man | Voice, 26 episodes |
| 1995 | Deadly Invasion: The Killer Bee Nightmare | Chad Ingram | Television film |
| 1995 | Vanished | John Taylor | Television film |
| 1996 | Guys Like Us | Mike Hanson | Episode: "Pilot" |
| 1996 | The Abduction | Paul Olavsky | Television film |
| 1996 | Unabomber: The True Story | David Kaczynski | Television film |
| 1996 | The Incredible Hulk | Tony Stark / Iron Man | Voice, episode: "Helping Hands, Iron Fist" |
| 1996 | Touched by an Angel | Scott Walden | Episode: "Groundrush" |
| 1996–97 | Spider-Man: The Animated Series | Tony Stark / Iron Man | Voice, 6 episodes |
| 1996 | Christmas Every Day | Henry Jackson | Television film |
| 1997 | Superman: The Animated Series | Edward Lytener / Luminus | Voice, 2 episodes |
| 1997 | Promised Land | Mark Gerhart | Episode: "Mr. Muscles" |
| 1997 | I'll Be Home for Christmas | Michael Greiser | Television film |
| 1998 | Kelly Kelly | Doug Kelly | 7 episodes |
| 1998 | 30 Years to Life | Vincent Dawson | Television film |
| 1999 | The Outer Limits | Dr. Peter Halstead | Episode: "Donor" |
| 2000 | Deadly Appearances | Andy Boychuk | Television film |
| 2000 | That '70s Show | Bud Hyde | 2 episodes |
| 2001 | Bette | Roy | 2 episodes |
| 2001 | The Retrievers | Tom Lowry | Television film |
| 2002 | Spin City | Los Angeles Mayor Stone Taylor | Episode: "A Tale of Four Cities" |
| 2002 | The Santa Trap | Bill Emerson | Television film |
| 2003 | Robbery Homicide Division | Eddie | Episode: "Hellbound Train" |
| 2012 | Shooting Gallery | Himself | Episode: "Survival Trail" |
| 2014 | Sharknado 2: The Second One | Captain Bob Wilson | Television film |
| 2020 | Smartphone Theatre | Jonathan 'Johnny' Cooper | Episode: "Holy Water" |

== Production credits ==
| Year | Title | Credit | Notes |
|---|---|---|---|
| 1986 | Starman | Director | Episode: "The Test" |
| 1998 | Kelly Kelly | Co-producer | |
| 2001 | Sex and a Girl | Producer | |
| 2007 | Nicky's Birthday Camera | Producer | |

| Preceded by William H. Marshall | Voice of Iron Man; 1994–1997 | Succeeded by Francis Diakowsky |
