= The High Country =

- Directed by: Harvey Hart
- Written by: Bud Townsend
- Produced by: Bruce Mallen
- Starring: Timothy Bottoms; Linda Purl
- Cinematography: Robert Ryan
- Music by: Eric N. Robertson
- Production companies: Filmcorp Entertainment Finances, Inc. Canadian Film Development Corporation
- Distributed by: Crown International Pictures
- Release date: 1981
- Country: Canada
- Language: English
- Box office: $1.1 million

The High Country is a 1981 Canadian adventure film directed by Harvey Hart and starring Timothy Bottoms and Linda Purl.

== Plot ==
A city man on the run from the law is guided through mountainous country by a rural woman with a learning disability. Despite their different backgrounds, they come to respect and love each other as her family and the police close in.

== Cast ==
- Timothy Bottoms as Jim
- Linda Purl as Kathy
- George Sims as Larry
- James Coleman as Casey
- Bill Berry as Carter
- Walter Mills as Clem
- Paul Coeur as Squeaky
