= Linda Purl =

American actress (born 1955)

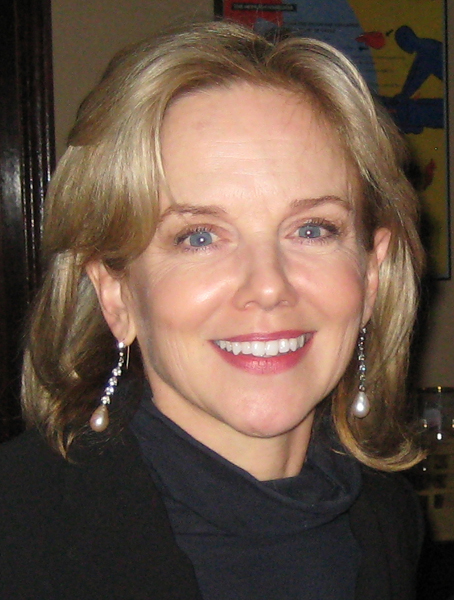
- Purl in 2010
- Born: September 2, 1955 (age 71); Greenwich, Connecticut, U.S.
- Education: Finch College
- Alma mater: Lee Strasberg Theatre and Film Institute
- Occupations: Actress; singer
- Years active: 1964–present
- Known for: Happy Days; Matlock
- Spouses: Desi Arnaz Jr. (m. 1979; div. 1980) William Broyles Jr. (m. 1988; div. 1992) Alexander Cary, Master of Falkland (m. 1993; div. 1999) James Vinson Adams (m. 2006; div. 2011)
- Partner(s): Patrick Duffy (2020–present)
- Children: 1
- Website: lindapurl.com

Signature
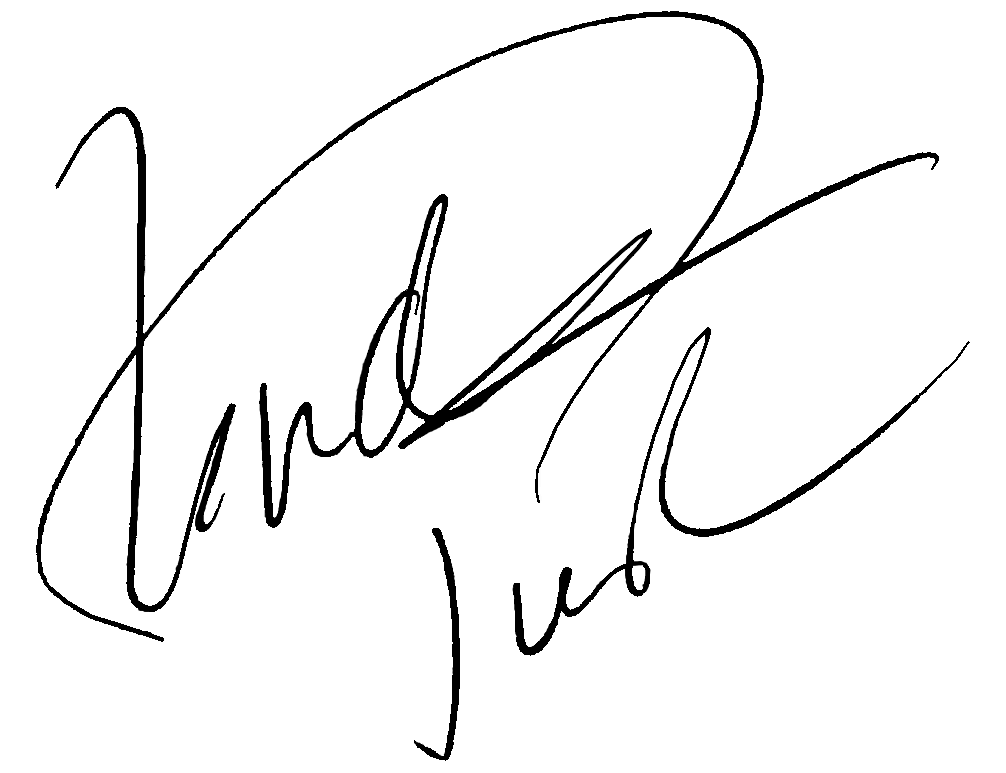

Linda Purl (born September 2, 1955) is an American actress. She is known for her roles as Gloria (Richie Cunningham's girlfriend in the second season) and Ashley Pfister (Fonzie's girlfriend in the tenth season) on the comedy series Happy Days; Sheila Munroe in the 1982 horror film Visiting Hours; Pam Beesly's mother Helene in The Office; and Ben Matlock's daughter Charlene Matlock for the first season of the television series Matlock.

== Early life ==
Purl was born on September 2, 1955, in Greenwich, Connecticut, to chemical-industry executive Raymond Charles Arthur Purl and Marshelline "Marshie" Purl. She has a sister, Mara. The girls' grandmother, Beatrice Saville, was a founder of the Actors' Equity Association. At age five, Purl moved with her family to Japan, where her father worked for Nippon Unicar. She spent her childhood there, and trained in acting at the Toho Geino Academy. While at the Imperial Theatre in Tokyo, Purl performed in several plays, gaining the role of Louis in The King and I, Bet in Oliver!, and Helen Keller in The Miracle Worker. Furthermore, she was discovered by Toho and appeared in several films.

At age 15, Purl returned to the United States.

== Acting career ==
=== Film ===
After playing a small role in Jory (1973), Purl's first major movie role was in Jonathan Demme's 1975 comedy, Crazy Mama. Her subsequent movie appearances have included W.C. Fields and Me (1976), Young Pioneers' Christmas (1976), Leo and Loree (1980), Visiting Hours (1982), The High Country (1984), Viper (1988), Natural Causes (1994), Mighty Joe Young (1998), The Perfect Tenant (2000), and Fear of the Dark (2003).

=== Television ===
Linda Purl has played several roles in television series, starting with The Secret Storm – a daytime "soap opera" drama (1973–1974). In 1978, she appeared as newlywed Molly Beaton in the ABC Western drama series The Young Pioneers, set in the Dakota Territory of the 1870s and based on the novels of Rose Wilder Lane. She also acted alongside Shaun Cassidy in the 1979 TV movie Like Normal People. Also in 1979, she starred in Women at West Point. On Happy Days, she played two different roles: Richie's occasional girlfriend Gloria in season two of the show (1974) and Fonzie's steady girlfriend Ashley eight seasons later (1982–1983). She also played secret agent Kate Del'Amico in the short-lived series Under Cover and played Brett Robin in the 1994–1995 series Robin's Hoods.

She has also featured in many movies made for television, including Testimony of Two Men, The Night the City Screamed, Little Ladies of the Night, and Spies, Lies & Naked Thighs. She voiced Delilah in a 1985 direct-to-video episode of The Greatest Adventure: Stories from the Bible.

Purl appeared in the historical-biographical TV mini-series Eleanor and Franklin, in 1976, broadcast on the American Broadcasting Company (ABC) television network. She portrayed Alice Roosevelt Longworth, daughter of President Theodore Roosevelt.

Purl guest-starred in a 1975 episode of Hawaii Five-O, "The Hostage", as teenaged babysitter Ruth held captive by a mentally ill veteran. She played two different roles on The Waltons; early in its run, in 1974, she played sophisticate Alicia in the season three-episode, "The Spoilers". In the season-five episode, "The Heartbreaker" (1977), she played Mary Ellen's sister-in-law (and Jason's love interest) Vanessa and also sang. In 1981, she starred in Manions of America. In 1984, she played Nydia, the blind flower girl in the miniseries "The Last Days of Pompeii". In 1985, she appeared in a Murder, She Wrote episode entitled "Murder at the Oasis". In 1988, she again made an appearance on Murder, She Wrote in the episode "Mourning Among the Wisterias" and in 1993, appeared for a third time on the series in "Dead Eye".

In 1986, Purl played Eve Harper, the love interest of rock star Niles Perry, played by Rick Moses, in the TV movie Pleasures.

In the first season of Matlock (1986–1987) starring Andy Griffith, Purl played Charlene, Ben Matlock's lawyer daughter. She was cast in the series First Monday (2002) as Sarah Novelli, a real estate agent and Justice Joseph Novelli's wife.

Purl appeared in the role of Pam Beesly's mother on NBC's The Office TV series, starting with the season-six episode "Niagara" in 2009–2010. Purl appeared in several more episodes throughout the series and was a romantic interest for Steve Carell's character. In May 2010, she made a guest appearance on Desperate Housewives. In 2011, Purl made guest appearances on Showtime's Homeland, playing Elizabeth Gaines. She played Barbara Pelt, mother of Debbie Pelt, in two episodes of HBO's True Blood in 2012. In 2017, Purl appeared in one episode of Designated Survivor, playing an old college supervisor of President Kirkman's, who assists in appointing nominees to the Supreme Court in the episode "The Ninth Seat".

She played a recurring character alongside her real-life boyfriend Patrick Duffy on The Bold and the Beautiful.

=== Theatre ===
Purl has been a regular performer (and was in the original cast) of international touring play Seven Deadly Sins Four Deadly Sinners. In November 2007, she appeared at the Théâtre Princesse Grace, Monte Carlo, directed by Marc Sinden, as part of Sinden's British Theatre Season, Monaco.

In 2008, Purl opened at the Cleveland Play House in Cleveland, Ohio, in a production of The Glass Menagerie by Tennessee Williams, playing Amanda.

== Music ==
Purl launched a jazz music career after leaving Matlock and has released several albums of music, including Out of This World – Live.

She released her fourth full-length album, a collaboration with music director Tedd Firth called This Could Be the Start on Reaching Records, August 2023. Purl is a jazz vocalist, known for imbuing classic show tunes and jazz standards with a distinctive narrative expressiveness.

== Personal life ==
Purl has been married and divorced four times. Her first marriage was January 13, 1979, to Desi Arnaz Jr., son of Lucille Ball and Desi Arnaz. On January 3, 1980, Purl filed for divorce, which was finalized later that year. On November 5, 1988, she married screenwriter William Broyles Jr., whom she later divorced. On July 23, 1993, Purl married British screenwriter and producer Alexander Cary, Master of Falkland, with whom she has a son. They later divorced. On July 15, 2006, she married James Vinson Adams whom she divorced in 2011.

Since 2020, she has been in a relationship with Patrick Duffy.

== Filmography ==
=== Film ===
Year	Film	Role	Notes
1970	Aru heishe no kake	Rose Allen	
1973	Jory	Amy Barron	
1975	Crazy Mama	Cheryl Stokes	
1980	Leo and Loree	Loree	
1981	The High Country	Kathy	
1982	Visiting Hours	Sheila Munroe	
1988	Viper	Laura Macalla	
1992	Body Language	Norma Suffield	
1994	Natural Causes	Jessie MacCarthy	
1996	Born Free: A New Adventure	Eleanor Porter	
1998	Mighty Joe Young	Dr. Ruth Young	
2000	The Perfect Tenant	Jessica Michaels	
2003	Fear of the Dark	Sandy Billings	
2016	Bender	Mrs. Thomas	
2020	The Swing of Things	Sherry Fairfax-Rothstein	
2020	Broken Halos	Blondie	

=== Television ===
Year	Film	Role	Notes
1973–74	The Secret Storm	Doreen Post	TV series
1974	Lucas Tanner	Diane	"Thirteen Going on Twenty"
1974	Sons and Daughters	Julie Ashley	"The Pregnancy"
1974	Happy Days	Gloria	Guest role (season 2)
1974	The Waltons	Alicia Hanover	"The Spoilers"
1975	Hawaii Five-O	Ruth	"The Hostage"
1975	Medical Center	Leslie	"Street Girl"
1975	Beacon Hill	Betsy Bullock	Main role
1975	Medical Story	Kim	"Us Against the World"
1976	The Oregon Trail	Deborah Randal	"Pilot"
1976	Young Pioneers	Molly Beaton	TV film
1976	State Fair	Bobbie Jean Shaw	TV film
1976	Julie Farr, M.D.	Laura Gorman	TV film
1976	Young Pioneers' Christmas	Molly Beaton	TV film
1976	Eleanor and Franklin	Alice Roosevelt (age 14-20)	"1.1", "1.2"
1977	Serpico	Magda	"Sanctuary"
1977	Little Ladies of the Night	Hailey Atkins	TV film
1977	The Waltons	Vanessa	"The Heartbreaker"
1977	Testimony of Two Men	Mavis Eaton	TV miniseries
1977	Black Market Baby	Anne Macarino	TV film
1978	The Young Pioneers	Molly Beaton	TV miniseries
1979	A Last Cry for Help	Sharon Muir	TV film
1979	Women at West Point	Jennifer Scott	TV film
1979	Like Normal People	Virginia Rae Hensler	TV film
1979	The Flame Is Love	Emmaline Nevada 'Vada' Holtz	TV film
1980	The Night the City Screamed	Brenda Farrell	TV film
1981	The Adventures of Nellie Bly	Nellie Bly	TV film
1981	The Manions of America	Deirdre O'Manion	TV miniseries
1982	Money on the Side	Annie Gilson	TV film
1982–83	Happy Days	Ashley Pfister	Main role (season 10)
1984	The Last Days of Pompeii	Nydia	TV miniseries
1985	The Love Boat	Anne Lester	2 episodes
1985	Midas Valley	Sarah Corey	TV film
1985	Alfred Hitchcock Presents	Lisa Tate	"Revenge"
1985	The Greatest Adventure: Stories from the Bible	Delilah	"Samson and Delilah"
1985	Murder, She Wrote	Terry Shannon	"Murder at the Oasis"
1986	Outrage!	Arlene Robbins	TV film
1986	Pleasures	Eve Harper	TV film
1986	Dark Mansions	Shellane Victor	TV film
1986–87	Matlock	Charlene Matlock	Main role (season 1)
1987	In Self Defense	Susan Andrews	TV film
1987	CBS Summer Playhouse	Judith	"Day to Day"
1988	Addicted to His Love	Cassie Robbins	TV film
1988	Murder, She Wrote	Crystal Wendle	"Mourning Among the Wisterias"
1988	Spies, Lies & Naked Thighs	Beverly	TV film
1989	Trying Times	Laura	"The Sad Professor"
1990	Timeless Tales from Hallmark	Rapunzel (voice)	"Rapunzel"
1990	Web of Deceit	Lauren Hale	TV film
1991	Under Cover	Kate Del'Amico	Main role
1992	Secrets	Jane Adams	TV film
1992	Jack's Place	Nicolette	"I See Cupid, I See France"
1993	Murder, She Wrote	Laura Callan	"Dead Eye"
1993	The Hidden Room	Kate Richards	"Her Life as a Dog"
1994	Accidental Meeting	Maryanne Bellmann	TV film
1994	Burke's Law	Kelly Harris	"Who Killed the Legal Eagle?"
1994	Incident at Deception Ridge	Helen Davis	TV film
1994–95	Robin's Hoods	Brett Robin	Main role
1996	Born Free: A New Adventure	Eleanor Porter	TV film
1997	Crisis Center	Lynn Maxfield	"It's a Family Affair"
1997	The Absolute Truth	Jean Douglas	TV film
1998	Walker, Texas Ranger	Barbara Conway	"Crusader"
1998	Touched by an Angel	Sally	"Flights of Angels"
1999	Holy Joe	Joan Wolrod	TV film
2000	Port Charles	Claire Wright	Guest role
2002	First Monday	Sarah Novelli	Main role
2003	Frozen Impact	Dr. Christy Blanchard	TV film
2003	Crossing Jordan	Joan	"Conspiracy"
2004	Stranger at the Door	Kathleen Norris	TV film
2005	Cold Case	Diane Moore	"Schadenfreude"
2005	Criminal Intent	Kirsten Sorensen	TV film
2006	Maid of Honor	Laci Collins	TV film
2009	Bones	Mrs. Diana Annenberg	"The Doctor in the Den"
2009–2011	The Office	Helene Beesly	Recurring role (seasons 6–7)
2010	Desperate Housewives	Lillian Allen	"A Little Night Music"
2010	Criminal Minds	Colleen Everson	"Our Darkest Hour"
2010	Lie to Me	Meredith Spencer	"In the Red"
2011	Homeland	Elizabeth Gaines	"Semper I", "Achilles Heel", "Marine One"
2012	True Blood	Barbara Pelt	"Whatever I Am, You Made Me", "We'll Meet Again"
2012	Stalked at 17	Lauren	TV film
2014	Major Crimes	Doris	"Flight Risk"
2014	Reckless	Barbara Fortnum	"Blind Sides", "Deep Waters", "51%", "And So It Begins"
2017	Designated Survivor	Julia Rombauer	"The Ninth Seat"
2018	The Oath	Gwenn Hammond	Recurring role
2018	Code Black	Madeline Mandel	"Change of Heart"
2021	Hacks	Kathy	"1.69 Million"
2022	General Hospital	Peyton Honeycutt	from Sept.15 to Oct. 17
2022	The Bold and the Beautiful	Lucy	

=== Theatre ===
Year	Title	Role	Notes
1967	The Miracle Worker	Helen Keller	Imperial Theatre, Tokyo
1968	Oliver!	Bet	Imperial Theatre, Tokyo
1968	The King and I	Louis Leonowens	Imperial Theatre, Tokyo
1984	On a Clear Day You Can See Forever	Daisy Gamble	San Bernardino Civic Light Opera
1984	Beyond Therapy	Prudence	Los Angeles Public Theatre
1985	Romeo and Juliet	Juliet	Mark Taper Forum
1986	Hedda Gabler	Mrs. Elvsted	Mark Taper Forum
1986	The Real Thing	Annie	Mark Taper Forum
1990	The Baby Dance	Wanda	Williamstown Theatre Festival
1991	The Baby Dance	Wanda	Lucille Lortel Theatre, Off-Broadway
1992	The Threepenny Opera	Lucy Brown	Williamstown Theatre Festival
1993	Nora	Nora	Williamstown Theatre Festival
1995	All the Way Home	Mary Follet	Williamstown Theatre Festival
1995	The Merchant of Venice	Portia	The Globe Theater
1997	The Road to Mecca	Elsa	Long Wharf Theatre
1997	Johnny On a Spot	Barbara Webster	Williamstown Theatre Festival
1998	Dinner With Friends	Karen	Actors Theatre of Louisville
1998	Getting and Spending	Victoria Phillips	Helen Hayes Theater, Broadway
2000	The Little Foxes	Regina Hubbard Giddens	Rubicon Theatre Company
2001	The Adventures of Tom Sawyer	Aunt Polly	Minskoff Theatre, Broadway
2002	A Streetcar Named Desire	Blanche DuBois	Rubicon Theatre Company
2006	Hippolytos	Phaidra	Barbara and Lawrence Fleischman Theater
2007	The Diary of Anne Frank	Mrs. Van Daan	Rubicon Theatre Company
2007	Seven Deadly Sins Four Deadly Sinners	Various	Théâtre Princesse Grace
2008	The Glass Menagerie	Amanda Wingfield	Cleveland Play House
2014	The Year of Magical Thinking	Joan Didion	Laguna Playhouse
2015	Copenhagen	Margrethe Bohr	Rubicon Theatre Company
2020	Mr. Toole	Thelma	59E59 Theater, Off-Broadway
2021	Tenderly: The Rosemary Clooney Musical	Rosemary Clooney	Ensemble Theatre Company at the New Vic Theatre
2022	Catch Me If You Can	Elizabeth Corban	UK Tour
2023	The Children	Rose	Ensemble Theatre Company at the New Vic Theatre
2023	The Year of Magical Thinking	Joan Didion	The Other Palace, London
2024	Mame	Mame Dennis	Concert Staging - Florida Theatre
2025	Love Letters	Melissa Gardener	Judson Theatre Company
2025	Crazy Mama, A True Story of Love and Madness	Various	Rubicon Theatre Company
2026	Crazy Mama, A True Story of Love and Madness	Various	59E59 Theater, Off-Broadway

== See also ==
- List of Matlock characters
