= Leo and Loree =

- Directed by: Jerry Paris
- Written by: James Ritz
- Story by: James Ritz; Ron Howard
- Produced by: Jim Begg
- Starring: Donny Most; Linda Purl
- Cinematography: Costa Petals
- Edited by: Ed Cotter
- Music by: Lance Rubin
- Production company: Major H Productions
- Distributed by: United Artists
- Release date: April 25, 1980
- Running time: 97 minutes
- Country: United States
- Language: English
- Box office: $517,988

Leo and Loree is a 1980 American romantic comedy film directed by Jerry Paris, starring Donny Most and Linda Purl. It was the first theatrical film from Ron Howard's production company.

== Plot ==
Leo and Loree are a young couple and aspiring actors trying to succeed in show business. Leo's career is hampered by his attitude, and Loree's career is helped by her mother – an Oscar-winning actress – who has opened doors for her. In spite of their feelings for each other, the ups and downs of the couple's professional lives affect their relationship.

== Cast ==
- Donny Most as Leo
- Linda Purl as Loree
- David Huffman as Dennis
- Jerry Paris as Tony
- Shannon Farnon as Christina Harper
- Allan Rich as Jarvis
- Susan Lawrence as Cindy

== Production ==
Ron Howard started the project in 1975 during spare time on weekends while filming Happy Days and started shooting scenes on 16 mm film. James Ritz, a writer for Happy Days, started a script but the project was put on hold until Howard took it to ABC as a potential television movie which led to Ritz expanding the rough script. After ABC later decided not to progress the project further, Howard set the project up at Major H Productions, which he had created in 1977 with his father Rance and brother Clint, funding most of the low budget himself. The film was their first theatrical release with United Artists acquiring domestic distribution rights in 1979.

The director, Jerry Paris, had filmed every episode of Happy Days at the time. The star, Donny Most, was also a regular on Happy Days, as Ralph Malph.

The film was shot in Southern California, including Malibu, Beverly Hills and Venice, Los Angeles.
