= Kelly Kelly (TV series) =

- Genre: Sitcom
- Created by: David Kendall
- Starring: Shelley Long; Robert Hays; Ashley Johnson; Will Estes; Bug Hall; Gemini Barnett
- Composer: Paul Buckley
- Country of origin: United States
- Original language: English
- No. of seasons: 1
- No. of episodes: 7

Production
- Executive producers: David Kendall; Dave Caplan; Brian LaPan; Shelley Long; Martin Mickelson
- Producer: Robert Hays
- Running time: 30 minutes
- Production companies: ItzBinso Long Productions; Utility Pictures; Warner Bros. Television

Original release
- Network: The WB
- Release: April 20 – June 7, 1998

Kelly Kelly is an American television sitcom created by David Kendall, starring Shelley Long and Robert Hays, that aired on The WB from April 20 to June 7, 1998.

== Plot ==
Kelly Novak is an Ivy League English literature professor who meets widowed fire chief Doug Kelly. The two get married and she becomes Kelly Kelly. They live together in his Secaucus, New Jersey, house with his three sons and one daughter.

== Cast ==
- Shelley Long as English professor Kelly Novak.
- Robert Hays as widowed firefighter Doug Kelly.
- Ashley Johnson as 15-year-old daughter Maureen Kelly.
- Will Estes as 20-year-old son Sean Kelly.
- Bug Hall as middle son Brian Kelly.
- Gemini Barnett as 6-year-old son Casey Kelly.

== Production ==
Columbia TriStar Television had originally developed the series, and produced a pilot, before handing over production of the show to Warner Bros. Television. During filming of the first episode, Shelley Long broke a finger while catching a football.

== Episodes ==
After airing two episodes to low ratings, The WB moved the series from Mondays to Sundays. Seven episodes are registered with the United States Copyright Office.

No.	Title	Directed by	Original release date	Prod. code	Viewers (millions)
1	"Episode One"	John Tracy	April 20, 1998	467151	3.54
2	"The Kilt Show"	John Tracy	April 27, 1998	467152	2.77
3	"The Wedding Show"	John Tracy	May 10, 1998	467154	1.68
4	"Bye, Bye, Baby"	John Tracy	May 17, 1998	467155	2.96
5	"Junior Firefighters"	John Tracy	May 24, 1998	467153	1.89
6	"Doodler"	John Tracy	May 31, 1998	467156	2.0
7	"Jealousy"	David Kendall	June 7, 1998	467157	1.61

== Reception ==
Howard Rosenberg of the Los Angeles Times called the series "routine sitcomdom" with "some occasional bright dialogue". John Carman of the San Francisco Chronicle was also unimpressed, and thought the show was "almost an exact copy of It Had to Be You", which lasted a month. Matthew Gilbert of The Boston Globe said the series was "neither horrible nor promising, just kind of generic and bland". David Bianculli of the Daily News rated the series one and a half stars, and called the scripts "painfully predictable and not even sporadically amusing". Kevin D. Thompson of The Palm Beach Post also rated the series one and a half stars saying that the show is "a bland family comedy we've seen too many times before". Elaine Liner of the Boston Herald gave the series no stars, as well as grading it "an F as a two-alarm failure".
