= Young Pioneers (novel) =

Novel by Rose Wilder Lane

Let the Hurricane Roar
- First edition published as a book
- Author: Rose Wilder Lane
- Genre: Western, historical fiction, children's literature
- Publisher: Longmans, Green and Co.
- Publication date: February 1933 (1932 serial, The Saturday Evening Post)
- Publication place: United States
- Media type: Print (serial, hardcover)
- Pages: 152 pp.
- OCLC: 1301589
- LC Class: PZ7.L2507 Le 1933; PZ7.L2507 Yo 1976

Let the Hurricane Roar, reissued as Young Pioneers starting from 1976, is a short novel by Rose Wilder Lane that incorporates elements of the childhood of her mother Laura Ingalls Wilder. It was published in The Saturday Evening Post as a serial in 1932 and by Longmans as a book early in 1933, not long after Little House in the Big Woods (1932), the first volume of her mother's Little House series.

During the 1970s the novel was adapted as a TV series, The Young Pioneers, and as two TV movies, Young Pioneers and Young Pioneers' Christmas.

== Summary ==
Newlyweds Molly and David are only sixteen and eighteen years old when they pack up their wagon and head west across the plains in search of a new homestead. At first their new life is full of promise: The wheat is high, the dugout is warm and cozy, and a new baby is born to share in their happiness. Then disaster strikes, and David must go east for the winter to find work. Molly is left alone with the baby — with nothing but her own courage to face the dangers of the harsh prairie winter. Under Lane's original title Let the Hurricane Roar, the two characters are named "Charles" and "Caroline" which were the actual names of Lane's maternal grandparents - they were changed to "Molly" and "David" for the re-issue of the book as Young Pioneers.

== Historical background ==
David is forced to go back east because of the grasshoppers plague, leaving his young wife and infant son alone to endure a brutal winter on their isolated farm. The very same plot line is a part of her mother's "On the Banks of Plum Creek".

Both of those incidents actually happened to Laura when she was about seven and lived in Walnut Grove, Minnesota. Due to the grasshoppers, her father Charles Ingalls had to leave home and look for a job. Her mother, Caroline stayed with Laura and her two sisters, and they had to run the farm. It is not mentioned in the book that Caroline was also pregnant at the time with the Ingalls' only son, who died before he was a year old.

Let the Hurricane Roar was first published in 1932 as a serial in The Saturday Evening Post while Laura Ingalls Wilder was writing Farmer Boy, the second-published book in the Little House series. The Longmans edition of Let the Hurricane Roar was published in February and reviewed in The New York Times on February 26, 1933. Despite book sales being reduced due to the economic situation, the strength over adversity theme of the book sold well to a Depression-weary public and it has remained in print to this day. Its medium length and straightforward style was also well-suited for the young adult market and the book became a mainstay in high school and public library collections.

The novel was adapted into a popular radio broadcast starring Helen Hayes.

Officially, the novel is not a part of the Little House series but it is published by HarperTrophy, the same unit of HarperCollins that keeps the Little House series in print.

== Adaptations ==
Young Pioneers is a made-for-television drama movie, based on the novel Let the Hurricane Roar by Rose Wilder Lane. It was first broadcast on March 1, 1976, and the novel was reissued as Young Pioneers that year.

The story includes biographical elements, based on the lives of Lane and her mother Laura Ingalls Wilder. It features Molly and David Beaton, teenage newlyweds in the Dakota Territory during the 1870s.

Young Pioneers was the pilot episode for The Young Pioneers, a three-episode TV series in April 1978.
