= Mark Freedland =

British legal scholar

Mark Freedland is emeritus professor of employment law at the University of Oxford and emeritus fellow and tutor of St John's College.

On 1 October 2005, he commenced a special Leverhulme Major Research Fellowship in which he is working towards a re-framing of the law of personal work contracts in the context of European law and the contemporary labour market. Freedland is also a published academic author.

== Notable publications ==
- Freedland, M., From the Contract of Employment to the Personal Work Nexus, (2006) 35 Industrial Law Journal 1
- Freedland, M., The Personal Employment Contract, 2003, ISBN 978-0-19-924926-8
- Freedland, M., Sciarra, S., Public Services and Citizenship in European Law - Public and Labour Law Perspectives, Oxford University Press, 1998, ISBN 0-19-826575-1
- Freedland, M., The Personal Employment Contract (Oxford Monographs on Labour Law), Oxford University Press, 2005, ISBN 0-19-929863-7
- Freedland, M., Sciarra, S., Davies, P., Employment Policy and the Regulation of Part-time Work in the European Union: A Comparative Analysis, Cambridge University Press, 2004, ISBN 0-521-84002-3
- Freedland, M., Auby, J., The Public Law/private Law Divide: Une Entente Cordiale? (Studies of the Oxford Institute of European & Comparative Law), Hart Publishing, 2006, ISBN 1-84113-635-2
- Freedland, M., Davies, P., Labour Legislation and Public Policy: A Contemporary History, Clarendon Press, 1999, ISBN 0-19-876280-1
