= Robert Donner =

American actor (1931–2006)

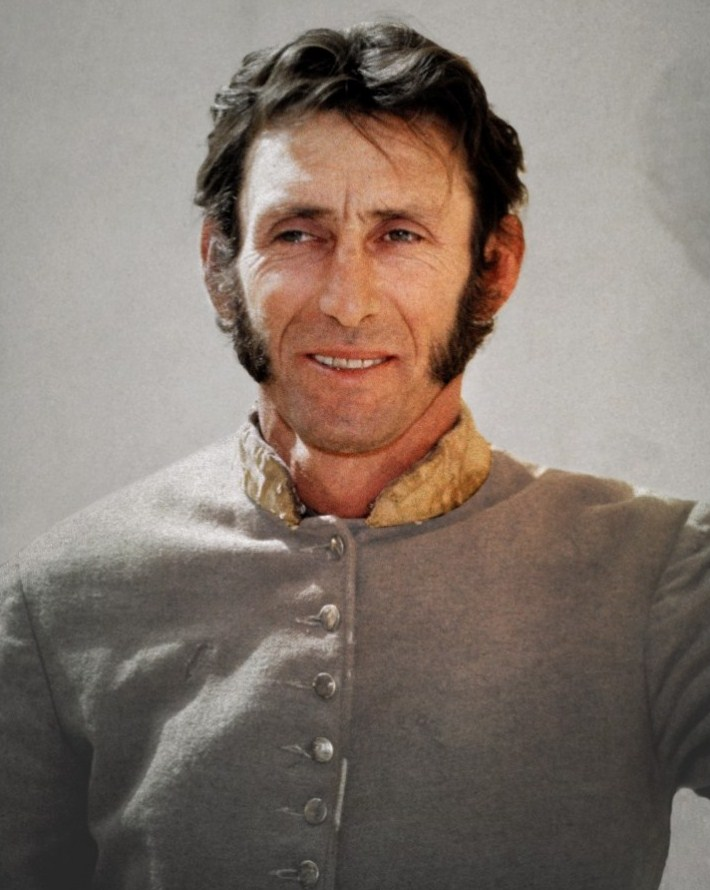
- Donner in The Undefeated, 1969
- Born: April 27, 1931; New York City, New York, U.S.
- Died: June 8, 2006 (aged 75); United States
- Occupation: Actor
- Years active: 1959–2006
- Spouse: Jill Sherman Donner (m. 1982–2006)

Robert Donner (April 27, 1931 – June 8, 2006) was an American television and film actor.

== Early life ==
Donner was born in New York City on April 27, 1931. He was raised in New Jersey, Michigan and Texas. He spent four years in the United States Navy and was stationed in California. After he completed his military service, he settled in the Los Angeles area.

== Career ==
Donner's first role was an uncredited part in the 1959 John Wayne Western Rio Bravo; he also appeared in the sequels (which formed a loose trilogy), El Dorado and Rio Lobo. He also appeared in Chisum, The Undefeated, and The Man Who Shot Liberty Valance. His best-known television roles were as the ex-convict/informant T.J. on Adam-12, Yancy Tucker on The Waltons and Exidor on Mork & Mindy. As Exidor, Donner's comic performance opposite Robin Williams's Mork made him an audience favorite.

== Personal life and death ==
Donner married producer/writer Jill Sherman in 1982. He died June 8, 2006 of a heart attack. He was 75.

== Selected filmography ==
=== Films ===
- 1959: Rio Bravo as Pedro
- 1963: The Nutty Professor as College Student (uncredited)
- 1964: The Disorderly Orderly as Interne (uncredited)
- 1965: Red Line 7000 as Leroy Agers (uncredited)
- 1966: Agent for H.A.R.M. as Morgue Attendant
- 1966: El Dorado as Milt
- 1967: Catalina Caper as Fingers O'Toole
- 1967: The Spirit Is Willing as Ebenezer Twitchell
- 1967: Cool Hand Luke as Boss Shorty
- 1968: The Private Navy of Sgt. O'Farrell as Marine Private Ogg
- 1968: Skidoo as Another Switchboard Operator
- 1969: The Undefeated as Judd Mailer
- 1970: Mrs. Pollifax-Spy as Larrabee
- 1970: Zig Zag as Sergeant Mason Weber
- 1970: Chisum as Bradley Morton
- 1970: Rio Lobo as Whitey Carter
- 1971: Vanishing Point as Deputy Collins
- 1971: One More Train to Rob as Sheriff Adams
- 1971: Fools' Parade as Willis Hubbard
- 1971: Something Big as Angel Moon
- 1972: Pickup on 101 as Jesse (1st Farmer)
- 1973: High Plains Drifter as Preacher
- 1973: The Man Who Loved Cat Dancing as Dub
- 1973: Santee as J.C.
- 1975: Bite the Bullet as Reporter
- 1975: The Boy Who Talked to Badgers as Burton
- 1975: Take a Hard Ride as Skave
- 1976: The Last Hard Men as Lee Roy
- 1977: Damnation Alley as Man / Guard
- 1979: Five Days from Home as Karl Baldwin
- 1981: Under the Rainbow as The Assassin
- 1983: Hysterical as Ralph
- 1986: Allan Quatermain and the Lost City of Gold as Swarma
- 1998: Leslie Nielsen's Stupid Little Golf Video as Himself, Leslie Nielsen's Trusted Caddie
- 2006: Hoot as Kalo

=== Television ===
- 1961–1965: Rawhide episodes; Toland in S3:E25, "Incident of the Running Man", Billings in S4:E4, "Judgement at Hondo Seco", Billy Bob Harger in S6:E4, "Incident of the Travellin' Man" & Adjutant in S8:E12, "The Testing Post"
- 1965: Combat! – episode: "Odyssey" as American GI
- 1965: I Spy – episode: "Dragon's Teeth" as Dr. Bustard
- 1966/67: Daniel Boone – episodes: "The Trap", "Take the Southbound Stage"
- 1967: Laredo – episode: "A Question of Guilt" as Patrick Clancy
- 1967: Garrison's Gorillas – episodes: "The Great Crime Wave", "The Great Theft
- 1968: I Spy – episode: "Home to Judgment" as Mailman
- 1968: Death Valley Days – episode: "Ten Day Millionaires" as Tom
- 1968: The Guns of Will Sonnett – episodes: "Guilt", "Look for the Hound Dog"
- 1968: Gunsmoke – episode: "A Noose for Dobie Price" as Gil Boylan
- 1968: Good Morning World – First Down and 200 Miles to Go" as Justice of the Peace
- 1968: The Guns of Will Sonnett – episode: as Lou Parkin
- 1968: The Virginian – episode: "Ride to Misadventure" as Matt Dooley
- 1968–1973: Adam-12 – 6 episodes as T.J.
- 1969: Bonanza – episode: "Meena" as Owen
- 1969: The Big Valley – episode: "Town of No Exit" as Pete Haunch
- 1969: Ironside – episode: "A Bullet for Mark" as Gas Station Owner
- 1970: The High Chaparral – episode: "A Matter of Vengeance" as Wilby
- 1970: Bonanza – episode: "The Horse Traders" as Owen Potter
- 1970: The High Chaparral – episode: "The Reluctant Deputy" as Sam Pelletier
- 1971: Alias Smith and Jones – episode: "Never Trust an Honest Man" as Preacher
- 1971: The Mod Squad – episodes: "Feet of Clay", "The Hot, Hot Car"
- 1971: Alias Smith and Jones – episode: "The Bounty Hunter" as Nate
- 1971: The Bold Ones: The Senator – episode: "George Washington Told a Lie" as Matlock
- 1973: Columbo – episode: "Any Old Port in a Storm" as The Drunk
- 1973: The Rookies - episode 5: "Get Ryker"
- 1973: McMillan & Wife – episode: "Two Dollars on Trouble to Win" as Price
- 1973: Cannon – episode: "The Seventh Grave" as Chief
- 1973: Kung Fu – episode: "The Tide" as Amos Houlton
- 1973: Griff – episode: "Isolate and Destroy" as Roscoe
- 1973: Mannix – episode: "Climb a Deadly Mountain" as Rizo
- 1974-1975: The Six Million Dollar Man – episodes: "Stranger in Broken Fork" & "The White Lightning War"
- 1974: McCloud – episode: "The Concrete Jungle Caper" as Val
- 1975: S.W.A.T. – episode: "Time Bomb" as Sarge
- 1975: Gunsmoke – episode: "The Hiders" as Belnap
- 1975: Cannon – episode: "Perfect Fit for a Frame" as Sheriff
- 1975: Walt Disney's Wonderful World of Color – episode: "The Boy Who Talked to Badgers: Parts 1 & 2" as Burton
- 1976: Sara – episode: "When Gentlemen Agree" as Harrington
- 1976: Captains and the Kings – miniseries – episode: "Chapter VII" as Wounded Texan
- 1976: Territorial Men – movie as Harrington as
- 1976: Young Pioneers' Christmas – movie as Mr. Peters
- 1976: Charlie's Angels – episode: "To Kill an Angel" as Korbin / Frank Evans
- 1976: The Quest – episode: "Incident at Drucker's Tavern" as Mr. Drucker
- 1976: City of Angels – episode: "The Bloodshot Eye"
- 1977: The Feather and Father Gang – episode: "Flight to Mexico"
- 1972–1978: The Waltons – 19 episodes as Yancy Tucker
- 1978–1982: Mork & Mindy – 22 episodes as Exidor
- 1978: How the West Was Won – episode: "Brothers" as Mr. Evans
- 1978: Walt Disney's Wonderful World of Color – episode: "Trail of Danger: Parts 1 & 2" as The Sheep Boss
- 1979: The MacKenzies of Paradise Cove – episode: "Last of the Red Hot Luaus" as Insbrocker
- 1979: B.J. and the Bear – episode: "Lobo"
- 1980-1981: The Incredible Hulk – episodes: "Sideshow", "The Phenom"
- 1981: Match Game – episode: "261" as himself
- 1983: Voyagers! – episode: "Buffalo Bill and Annie Play the Palace" as Buffalo Bill Cody
- 1983: Little House on the Prairie – episode: "The Older Brothers" as Bart Younger
- 1983: The Mississippi – episode: "Crisis of Identity" as Bates
- 1984: The A-Team – episode: "Breakout!" as Sheriff J.C. Bickford
- 1984: Simon & Simon – episode: "A Little Wine with Murder?" as Cody Dexter
- 1984: Oh Madeline – episode: "Ladies' Night Out" as Gambler
- 1984: Blue Thunder – episode: "Revenge in the Sky" as Neil Gerrard
- 1986-1988: Matlock – episodes: "The Cop", "The Fisherman"
- 1986: Murder, She Wrote – episode: "If a Body Meet a Body" as Silas Pike
- 1987-1989: MacGyver – episodes: "Soft Touch", "Cleo Rocks"
- 1987: Fame – episode: "That Was the Weekend That Was" as Exalted Muskrat
- 1987–1988: Falcon Crest – 5 episodes as Tucker Fixx
- 1988: Webster – episode: "The Cuckoo's Nest" as Tiger
- 1989: Good Morning, Miss Bliss – episode: "The Mentor" as James Lyman
- 1990: MacGyver – episode: "Serenity, and MacGyver's Women" as Milt Bozer
- 1991-1994: Columbo – episodes: "Caution: Murder Can Be Hazardous to Your Health", "Undercover"
- 1991: Murder, She Wrote – episode: "From the Horse's Mouth" as Sheriff Tyrone McKenna
- 1992: In the Heat of the Night – episode: "Family Reunion" as Roy Paxton
- 1995: Legend – 5 episodes as Mayor Chamberlain Brown
- 1998: Pacific Blue – episode: "Heat of the Moment" as Luther
- 1999-2000 Early Edition - 2 episodes "Time" and "Fate" as Lucius Snow
