= Freeland (surname) =

Freeland is a surname. Notable people with the surname include:

- Adam Freeland (born 1973), English music producer and DJ
- Alex Freeland (born 2001), American baseball player
- Blake Freeland (born 2000), American football player
- Chris Freeland (born 1969), American politician
- Chrystia Freeland (born 1968), Canadian author and politician
- Cynthia Freeland (born 1951), American philosopher of art
- Don Freeland (1925–2007), American race car driver
- Ewing Y. Freeland (1887–1953), American football and baseball player
- Ian Freeland (1912–1979), British Army lieutenant-general
- Joel Freeland (born 1987), English basketball player
- Kyle Freeland (born 1993), American baseball player
- Martin Freeland, British record producer
- Richard M. Freeland (born 1941), American academic administrator
