= Blanche Hanalis =

American screenwriter (1915–1992)

Blanche Hanalis (11 December 1915 – 27 July 1992) was an American screenwriter and television writer best known for developing the Little House on the Prairie series as well as several made-for-TV movies based on Little House on the Prairie. Hanalis was born as Blanche Weiss in Ohio, but grew up in Chicago and graduated from Theodore Roosevelt High School in 1932. She was of Greek and Jewish descent. She has been quoted as saying her family was poor and she grew up "in the slums of Chicago."

The family relocated to New York City after her father's candy business failed, and she started working to help support them rather than attend college. Hanalis married Irving Wodin and together they had three children. In 1957, once the children were in school, she wrote her first television script and submitted it to The Philco-Goodyear Television Playhouse. It was quickly accepted, and Hanalis continued writing for over thirty years. She wrote episodes for numerous television programs, including: My Favorite Martian, The Barbara Stanwyck Show, Family Affair, and The Young Pioneers.

She wrote the screenplays for From the Mixed Up Files of Mrs. Basil E Frankweiler, A Tree Grows in Brooklyn, and Portrait of a Rebel: The Remarkable Mrs. Sanger. Her work, A Love Affair: The Eleanor and Lou Gehrig Story, was nominated for an Emmy award in 1978 for Outstanding Writing in a Special Program—Drama or Comedy—Adaptation. Hanalis won a Writers Guild of America Award in Television—Children's Script for her 1987 adaptation of The Secret Garden. Hanalis also contributed to the story of a major motion picture Weddings and Babies, which won the Critic's Award at the 1958 Venice Film Festival.

Hanalis died in 1992.
