= Free Land (novel) =

1938 novel by Rose Wilder Lane

- First edition published as a book
- Author: Rose Wilder Lane
- Cover artist: John O'Hara Cosgrove II
- Genre: Western, realistic fiction
- Publisher: Longmans, Green, and Co.
- Publication date: May 4, 1938
- Publication place: United States
- Media type: Print (serial, hardcover)
- Pages: 332 pp. (or 322)
- OCLC: 1193588
- LC Class: PZ3.L244 Fr PS3523.A553

Free Land is a novel by Rose Wilder Lane that features American homesteading during the 1880s in what is now South Dakota. It was published in The Saturday Evening Post as a serial during March and April 1938 and then published as a book by Longmans.

== Summary ==
The newlywed Beatons migrate to Dakota Territory during the 1880s to claim 300 acres (1.2 km^{2}) of grassland. But their struggle to survive includes brutal isolation from the rest of the world as cyclones and blizzards hit, and drought challenges their ability to live off their land.

== Historical background ==
The author, Rose Wilder Lane, grew up herself in the time and place of which she writes. Her parents homesteaded in Dakota. Many of the events described in the book, actually happened to either her parents (Laura Ingalls Wilder and Almanzo Wilder), or her grandparents (Caroline and Charles Ingalls). The book is similar in a way to the Little House series, only it is darker and more serious.

== Reception ==
Kirkus Reviews published a starred review concluding, "It is a vigorous and moving story – a slice out of the American scene. And eminently readable." Regarding its 1933 predecessor in particular, it "[bears] perhaps too close a resemblance to Let The Hurricane Roar in general pattern and some details, but [shows] a distinct advance in handling."

== Adaptations ==
Free Land was adapted as a radio drama starring Martha Scott (1914–2003), whose audio recording was distributed for American Armed Forces only as a 1973 LP record.
