= Ed Friendly =

American television producer (1922–2007)

- Born: Edwin Samson Friendly, Jr. April 8, 1922; New York City, New York, U.S.
- Died: June 17, 2007 (aged 85); Rancho Santa Fe, California, U.S.
- Occupation: Television producer
- Years active: 1949-2005
- Known for: Co-creating/creating and developing Rowan & Martin's Laugh-In, Little House on the Prairie, and Backstairs at the White House
- Spouse(s): Paula Zinnemann (2003 - 2007) (his death); Natalie Brooks Coulson (1952 - 2002) (her death) (2 children)

Edwin Samson Friendly Jr. (April 8, 1922 – June 17, 2007) was an American television producer. He was responsible for creating the television programs Rowan & Martin's Laugh-In, Little House on the Prairie, and Backstairs at the White House.

Born in New York City, Ed Friendly served with the United States Army in the Pacific Theater of Operations during World War II. After the war, he worked at the advertising agency of Batten, Barton, Durstine & Osborn. He began his television career in 1949, working for ABC as director of sales before briefly moving to Barry & Enright Productions in 1953, and then moving to CBS as a contract producer and then, in 1959, to NBC as vice president of special programs.

Friendly moved to California in 1967 and formed his second production company George Schlatter-Ed Friendly Productions with George Schlatter, and then his third own production company, Ed Friendly Productions, Inc. after Schlatter and Friendly broke their partnership in 1972. He received the Western Heritage Award from the National Cowboy Hall of Fame in 1975 for Little House on the Prairie and in 1978 for Peter Lundy and the Medicine Hat Stallion, an adaptation of the 1972 children's novel San Domingo, the Medicine Hat Stallion by Marguerite Henry.

== Thoroughbred horse racing ==
Friendly was introduced to racing Thoroughbred horse ownership in 1970, when he bought a racehorse in partnership with his close friend Lorne Greene. He subsequently expanded his racing interests, partnering with his first wife, Natalie, in a large (around 70) stable of horses. Some of their successful horses include:

- Vivid Angel – won 1997 Oak Leaf Stakes
- Friendly Michelle – won 2004 Santa Paula Stakes
- Gray Slewpy – multiple stakes winner including the 1992 Ancient Title Handicap

A founding member of the National Thoroughbred Association, Friendly established the Thoroughbred Owners of California in 1993. He also served as the president of California Horsemen's Benevolent and Protective Association.

== Personal life ==
Friendly married the former Natalie Brooks Coulson on January 31, 1952; the couple remained married for 50 years, until her death on May 9, 2002. With his wife Natalie, Friendly was well known on the Southern California Thoroughbred racing circuit. They had two children; their daughter, Brooke Friendly, is the director of the Ashland Center for Theatre Studies at Southern Oregon University, and their son Edwin S. Friendly III, who is known as "Trip", is a former Ticketmaster International executive who had been developing projects with his father. After his first wife's passing, Friendly married the former Paula Zinnemann on November 27, 2003; they remained married until his death.

== Death ==
Friendly died in 2007 at his home in Rancho Santa Fe, California He was survived by his second wife, Paula, his children, and three granddaughters.
