= Rose Wilder Lane =

American journalist, writer, and political theorist (1886–1968)

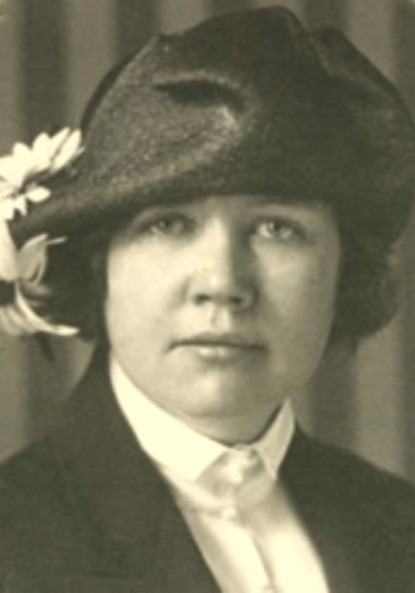
- Born: Rose Wilder; December 5, 1886; De Smet, Dakota Territory, U.S.
- Died: October 30, 1968 (aged 81); Danbury, Connecticut, U.S.
- Occupation: Writer
- Spouse: Claire Gillette Lane (m. 1909; div. 1918)
- Relatives: Laura Ingalls Wilder (mother); Almanzo Wilder (father)
- Writing career
- Period: 1914–1965
- Notable work: The Discovery of Freedom

Rose Wilder Lane (December 5, 1886 – October 30, 1968) was an American writer and daughter of American writer Laura Ingalls Wilder. Along with two other female writers, Ayn Rand and Isabel Paterson, Lane was one of the more influential advocates of the American libertarian movement.

== Early life ==
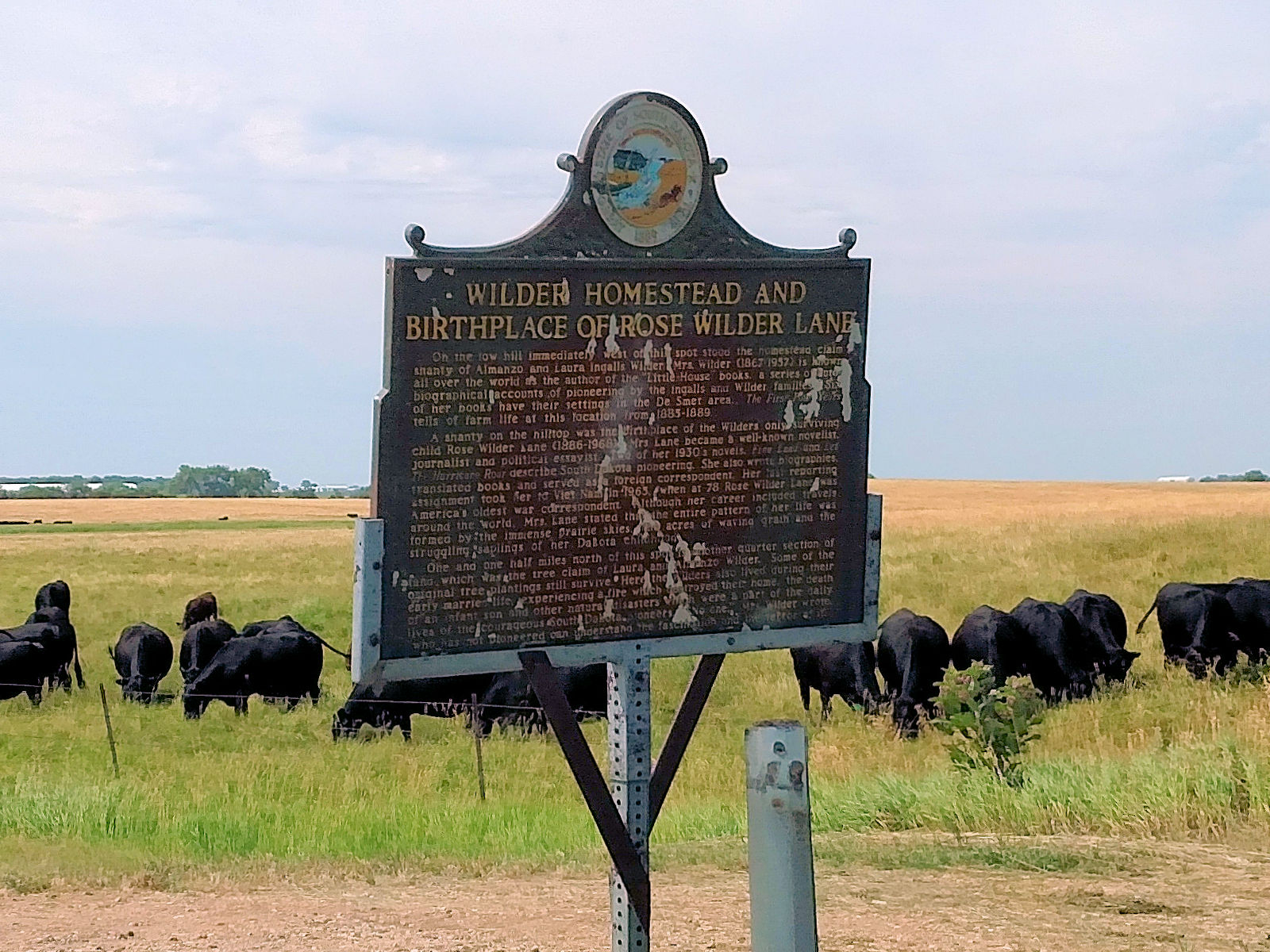
Lane's birthplace roadside marker

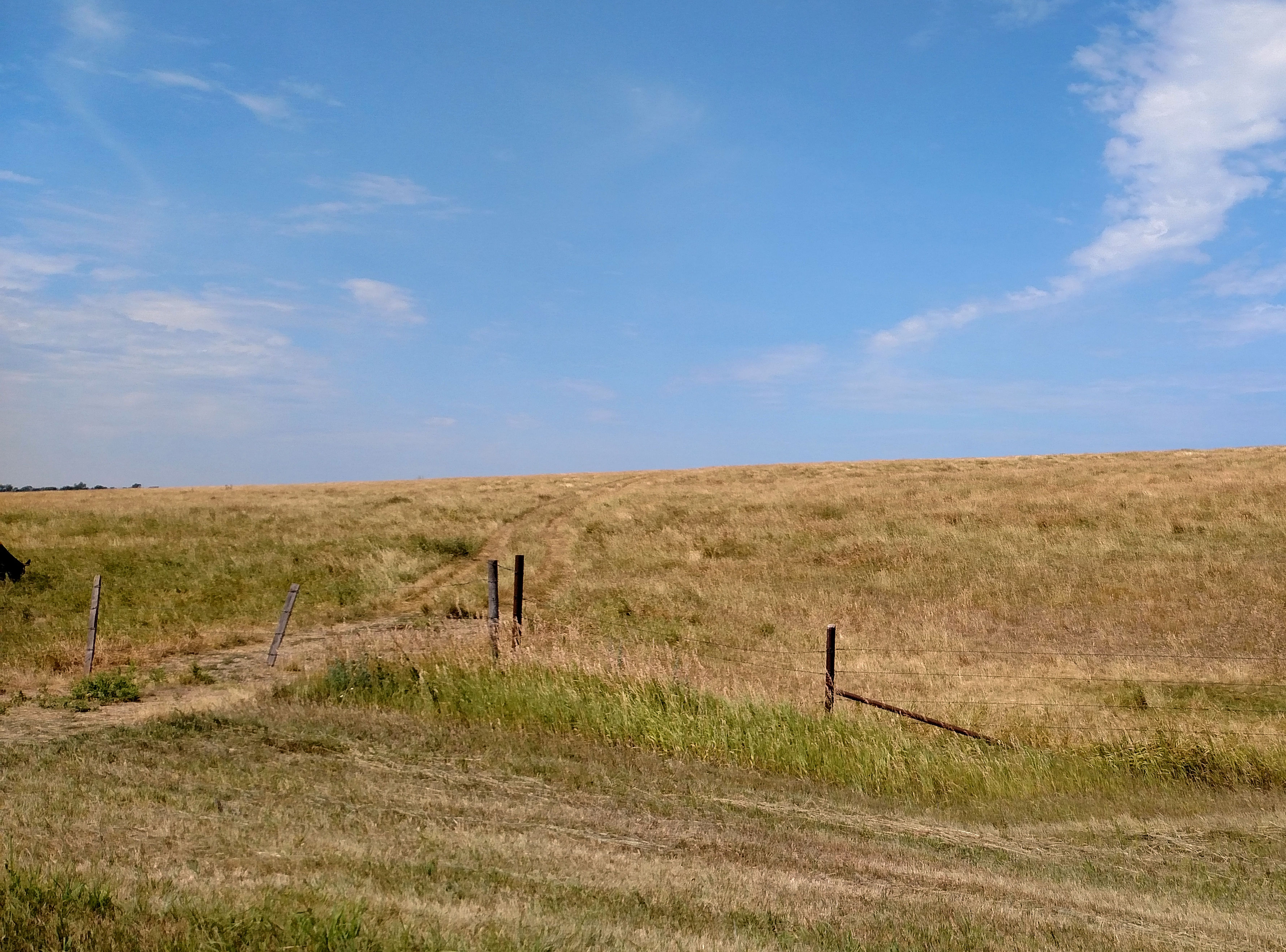
Location of the Wilder homestead where Lane was born in DeSmet, South Dakota

Lane was the first child of Laura Ingalls Wilder and Almanzo Wilder and the only child of her parents to survive into adulthood. Her early years were a difficult time for her parents because of successive crop failures, illnesses and chronic economic hardships. During her childhood, the family moved several times, living with relatives in Minnesota and then Florida and briefly returning to De Smet, South Dakota before settling in Mansfield, Missouri in 1894. There, her parents eventually established a dairy farm and fruit orchards. She attended secondary school in Mansfield and Crowley, Louisiana while living with her aunt Eliza Jane Wilder, graduating in 1904 from Crowley High School in a class of seven. Her intellect and ambition were demonstrated by her ability to compress three years of Latin into one and by graduating at the top of her high school class in Crowley. Despite her academic success, she was unable to attend college as a result of her parents' financial situation.

== Early career, marriage and divorce ==
After high school graduation, Lane returned to her parents' home in Mansfield and learned telegraphy at the Mansfield railroad station. Not satisfied with the options open to young women in Mansfield, by early 1905 she was working for Western Union in Sedalia, Missouri. By 1906, Lane was working as a telegrapher at the Midland Hotel in Kansas City, Missouri. Over the next five years, Lane worked as a telegrapher in Missouri, Indiana and California.

In 1908, Lane moved to San Francisco, where she worked as a telegrapher at the Fairmont Hotel. In March 1909, Lane married salesman, promoter and occasional newspaperman Claire Gillette Lane. Evidence suggests the Lanes had met back in Kansas City and Lane's diary hints that she moved to San Francisco to join her future husband. Shortly after they wed, Lane quit her job with Western Union and the couple embarked on travels across the United States to promote various schemes. Lane soon became pregnant. While staying in Salt Lake City the following November, Lane gave birth to a premature, stillborn son, according to public records. Subsequent surgery in Kansas City likely left her unable to bear children. The topic is mentioned only briefly in a handful of existing letters written by Lane years after the infant's death in order to express sympathy and understanding to close friends who were also dealing with the loss of a child.

For the next few years, the Lanes continued to live a nomadic lifestyle, including stays in Missouri, Ohio, New York and Maine to work together and separately on various promotional and advertising projects. While letters to her parents described a happy-go-lucky existence, Lane's subsequent diary entries and numerous autobiographical magazine articles later described her mindset at this time as depressed and disillusioned with her marriage. She felt her intellectual interests did not mesh with the life she was living with her husband. One account even had her attempting suicide by drugging herself with chloroform only to awake with a headache and a renewed sense of purpose in life.

During these years, Lane, keenly aware of her lack of a formal education, read voraciously and taught herself several languages. Her writing career began around 1908, with occasional freelance newspaper jobs that earned much-needed extra cash. In 1913 and 1914, the Lanes sold farmland in what is now the San Jose/Silicon Valley area of Northern California. Conditions often required them to work separately to earn greater commissions and of the two, Lane turned out to be the better salesperson. The marriage floundered as there were several periods of separation and eventually an amicable divorce. Lane's diaries reveal subsequent romantic involvements with several men in the years following her divorce, but she never remarried and eventually chose to remain single and free of romantic attachments.

The threat of America's entry into World War I had seriously weakened the real estate market, so in early 1915 Lane accepted a friend's offer of a stopgap job as an editorial assistant on the staff of the San Francisco Bulletin. The stopgap turned into a watershed. She immediately caught the attention of her editors not only through her talents as a writer in her own right, but also as a highly skilled editor for other writers. Before long, her photo and byline were running in the Bulletin daily, churning out formulaic romantic fiction serials that ran for weeks at a time. Lane's first-hand accounts of the lives of Henry Ford, Charlie Chaplin, Jack London and Herbert Hoover were published in book form.

Later in 1915, Lane's mother visited San Francisco for several months. Together they attended the Panama–Pacific International Exposition. Details of this visit and Wilder's daily life in 1915 are preserved in Wilder's letters to her husband in West from Home, published in 1974. Although Lane's diaries indicate she was separated from her husband in 1915, her mother's letters do not indicate this. Lane and her husband are recorded as living together with him unemployed and looking for work during her mother's two-month visit.

== Freelance writing career ==
By 1918, Lane's marriage officially ended and she had quit her job with the San Francisco Bulletin following the resignation of managing editor Fremont Older. It was at this point that Lane launched her career as a freelance writer. From this period through the early 1940s, her work regularly appeared in leading publications such as Harper's, Saturday Evening Post, Sunset, Good Housekeeping and Ladies' Home Journal. Several of her short stories were nominated for O. Henry Prizes, and a few novels became top sellers.

Lane became the first biographer of Herbert Hoover, writing The Making of Herbert Hoover in 1920 in collaboration with Charles K. Field, editor of Sunset magazine. The book was published well before Hoover became president in 1929. A friend and defender of Hoover's for the remainder of her life, many of her personal papers would later be included in the Rose Wilder-Lane Collection at the Herbert Hoover Library in West Branch, Iowa. While Lane's papers contain little actual correspondence between them, the Hoover Post-Presidential Individual series contains a file of Rose's correspondence that spans from 1936 to 1963.

In the late 1920s, Lane was reputed to be one of the highest-paid female writers in America, and along with Hoover, she counted among her friends well-known figures such as Sinclair Lewis, Isabel Paterson, Dorothy Thompson, John Patric and Lowell Thomas. Despite this success, her compulsive generosity with her family and friends often found her strapped for cash and forced to work on material that paid well, but thus did not engage her growing interests in political theory and world history. During these times of depression, Lane was unable to move ahead with her own writing, but she would easily find work as a ghostwriter or silent editor for other well-known writers. In 1928, Lane returned to her parents' farm and lived there for a time. Confident in her sales of her books and short stories as well as her growing stock market investments, she spent freely, building a new home for her parents on the property and modernizing the farmhouse for herself and a steady stream of visiting literary friends.

Lane's occasional work as a traveling war correspondent began with a stint with the American Red Cross Publicity Bureau in post-World War I Europe. In 1922 and 1923, Lane worked in publicity with Near East Relief, a humanitarian organization, touring Armenia and Turkey. In January 1923, Lane worked discreetly with Mabel Evelyn Elliott, a physician who worked with American Women's Hospital and Near East Relief. Together they wrote a memoir that combined their experiences in Armenia and Turkey and Lane's research into Armenian history. Lane's name did not appear on the cover of Elliott's book Beginning Again at Ararat, but the book's contract, held in the archives of Baker Publishing Group, revealed the collaboration. The book was republished in 2025 as Children of Ararat, the intended title of the book.

Lane continued with the American Red Cross through 1965, reporting from Vietnam at the age of 78 for Woman's Day magazine to provide "a woman's point of view". She traveled extensively in Europe and Asia as part of the Red Cross. In 1926, Lane, Helen Dore Boylston and their French maid traveled from France to Albania in a car they had named Zenobia. An account of the journey called Travels With Zenobia: Paris to Albania by Model T Ford was published in 1983. Lane became enamored with Albania and lived there for several long periods during the 1920s, spaced between sojourns to Paris and her parents' Rocky Ridge Farm in Missouri. She informally adopted a young Albanian boy named Rexh Meta (pronounced [rɛd͡ʒ mɛta]), who she claimed saved her life on a dangerous mountain trek. She later sponsored his education at Cambridge University. He served in the Albanian government and was imprisoned for over thirty years by both the Italian fascists and the Albanian communists, dying in Tirana in 1985.

== Literary collaboration ==
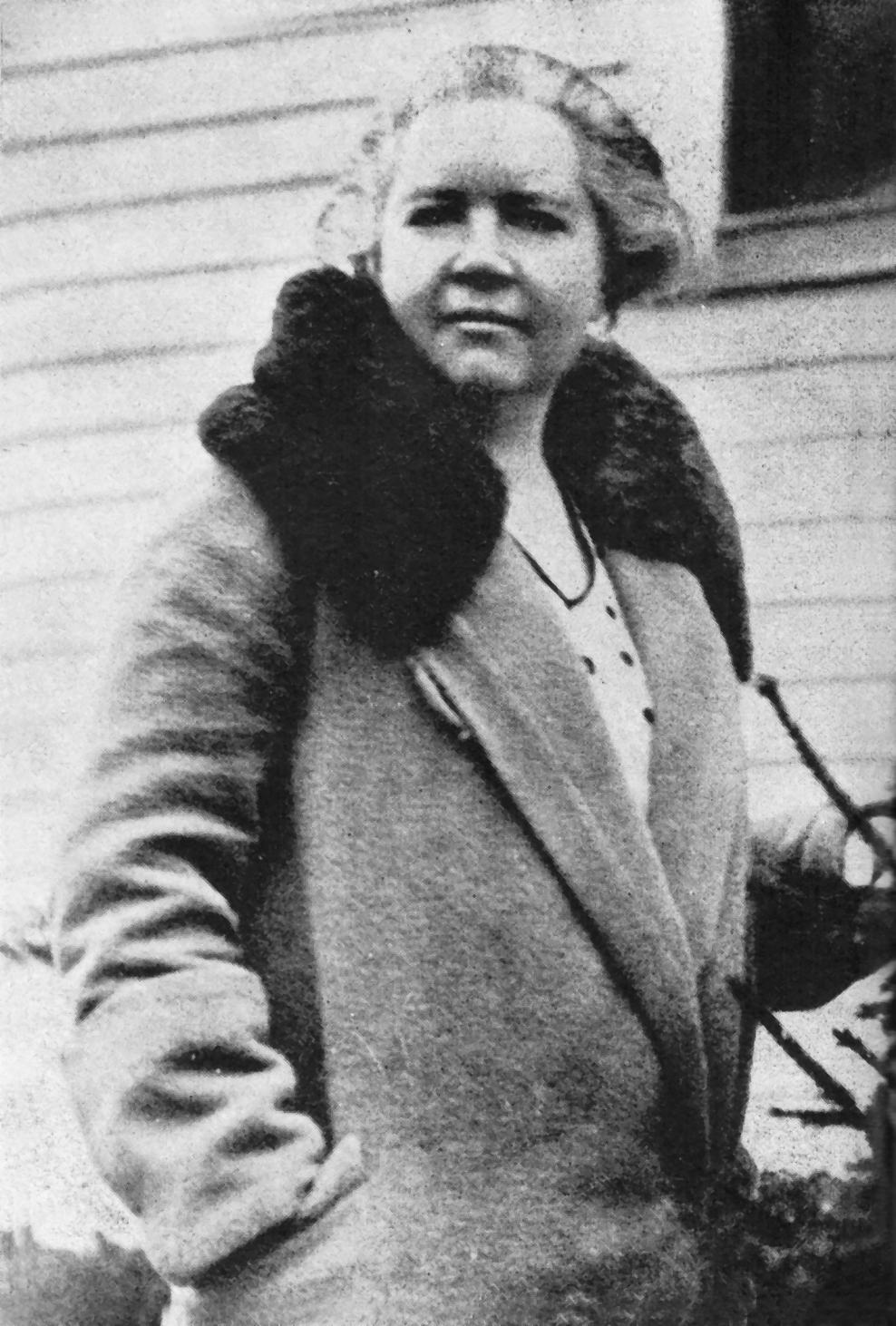
Lane in 1933

Lane's role in her mother's Little House book series has remained unclear. Her parents had invested with her broker upon her advice and when the market crashed the Wilders found themselves in difficult times. Lane returned to live on the farm at 46 years old, with minimal finances to keep her afloat.

In late 1930, Lane's mother approached her with a rough, first-person narrative manuscript outlining her hardscrabble pioneer childhood, Pioneer Girl. Lane took notice and started using her connections in the publishing world. Despite Lane's efforts to market Pioneer Girl through her publishing connections, the manuscript was rejected time and again. One editor recommended writing a novel for children out of the beginning. Wilder and Lane worked on the idea and the result was Little House in the Big Woods. Historian Linda Kerber however has stated that Lane rewrote her mother's memoirs into the book to more align with her individualist politics. Accepted for publishing by Harper and Brothers in late 1931, then hitting the shelves in 1932, the book's success resulted in the decision to continue the series, following young Laura into young adulthood. The First Four Years was discovered as a manuscript after Lane's death in 1968. Wilder had written the manuscript about the first four years of her marriage and the struggles of the frontier, but she never had intended for it to be published. However, in 1971 it became the ninth volume in the Little House series.

== Successful novels ==
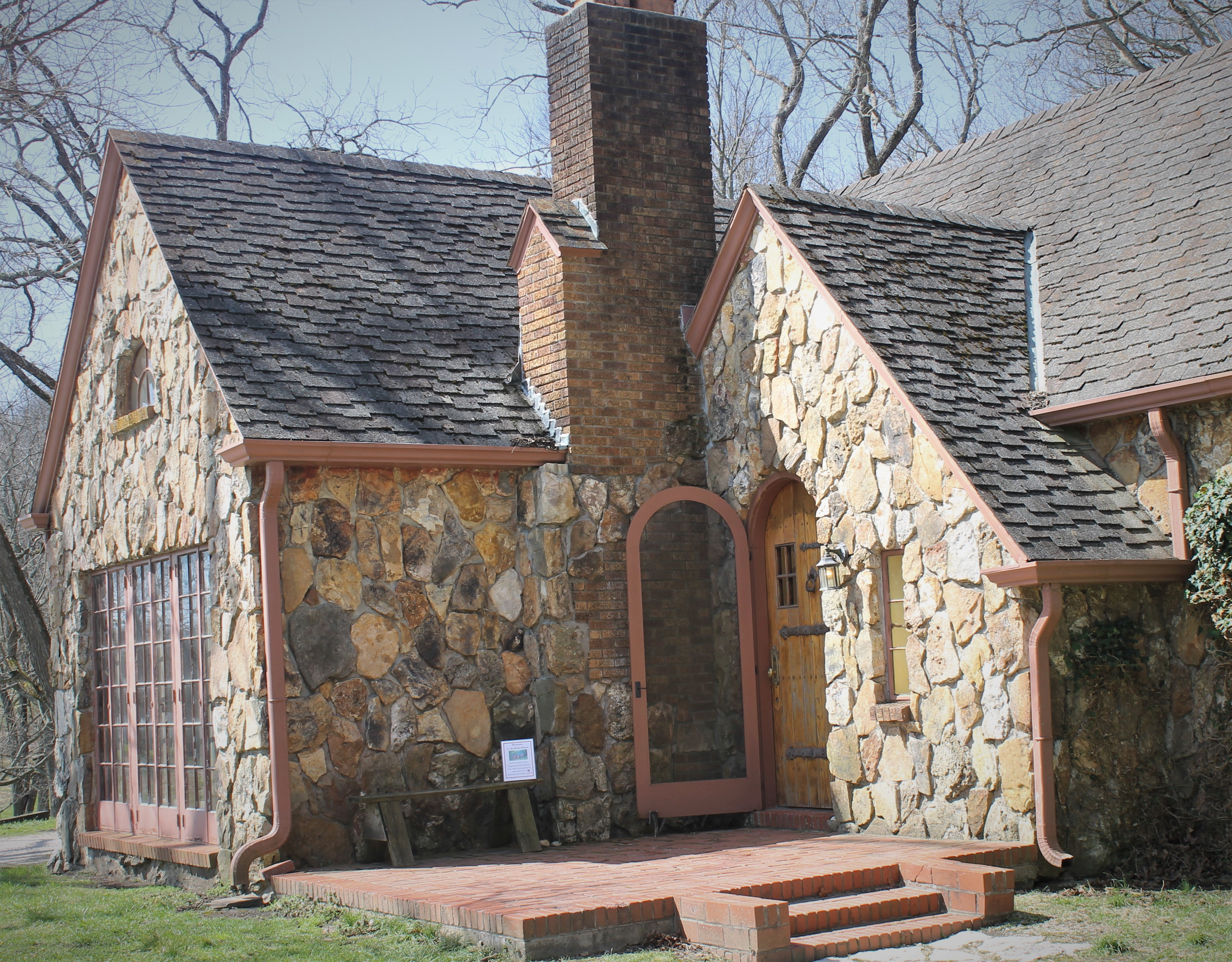
Located a short distance from the Wilder farmhouse in Mansfield, Missouri, is the Rock House which Lane had built for her parents, who resided there during much of the 1930s

The collaboration between the two is believed by literary historians to have benefited Lane's career as much as her mother's. Lane's most popular short stories and her two most commercially successful novels were written at this time and were fueled by material which was taken directly from Wilder's recollections of Ingalls-Wilder family folklore. Let the Hurricane Roar (later titled Young Pioneers) and Free Land both addressed the difficulties of homesteading in the Dakotas in the late 19th century and how the so-called "free land" in fact cost homesteaders their life savings. The Saturday Evening Post paid Lane top fees to serialize both novels, which were later adapted for popular radio performances. Both books represented Lane's creative and literary peak. In 1938, the Saturday Evening Post paid her $30,000 ($686,170 by today's standards) to serialize her best-selling novel Free Land. Let the Hurricane Roar saw an increasing and steady sale, augmented by its adaptation into popular radio dramatization that starred Helen Hayes.

In 1938, with the proceeds of Free Land in hand, Lane was able to pay all of her accumulated debts. She moved to Danbury, Connecticut and purchased a rural home there with three wooded acres, on which she lived for the rest of her life. At this same time, the growing royalties from the Little House books were providing Lane's parents with an assured and sufficient income. Lane bought her parents an automobile and financed construction of the Rock House near the Wilder homestead. Her parents resided in the Rock House during much of the 1930s.

== Return to journalism and societal views ==
During World War II, Lane enjoyed a new phase in her writing career. From 1942 to 1945, she wrote a weekly column for The Pittsburgh Courier, at the time the most widely read African-American newspaper.

Rather than hiding or trimming her laissez-faire views, Lane seized the chance to sell them to the readership. She sought out topics of special interest to her audience. Her first entry characterized the Double V campaign as part of the more general fight for individual liberty in the United States, writing: "Here, at last, is a place where I belong. Here are the Americans who know the value of equality and freedom". Her columns highlighted success stories of blacks to illustrate broader themes about entrepreneurship, freedom and creativity. In one, she compared the accomplishments of Robert Lee Vann and Henry Ford. Vann's rags to riches story illustrated the benefits in a "capitalist society in which a penniless orphan, one of a despised minority can create The Pittsburgh Courier and publicly, vigorously, safely, attack a majority opinion" while Ford's showed how a poor mechanic can create "hundreds of jobs, [...] putting even beggars into cars".

Lane combined advocacy of laissez faire and anti-racism. The views she expressed on race were similar to those of Zora Neale Hurston, a fellow individualist and writer who was black. Her columns emphasized the arbitrariness of racial categories and stressed the centrality of the individual. Instead of indulging in what she referred to as the "ridiculous, idiotic and tragic fallacy of race, [by] which a minority of the earth's population has deluded itself during the past century", Lane believed it was time for all Americans, black and white, to "renounce their race". Judging by skin color was comparable to the communists who assigned guilt or virtue on the basis of class. In Lane's view, the fallacies of race and class hearkened to the "old English-feudal 'class' distinction". She further believed that the collectivists, including those who embraced President Franklin D. Roosevelt's New Deal, were to blame for filling "young minds with fantasies of 'races' and 'classes' and 'the masses,' all controlled by pagan gods, named Economic Determinism or Society or Government".

Along with Hurston and Paterson, Lane was critical of Roosevelt on his foreign policy and was against drafting young men into a foreign war.

== The Discovery of Freedom ==
For a few months in 1940, Lane's growing zeal for libertarianism united her with the well-known vagabond free-lance writer John Patric, a like-minded political thinker whose advocacy of libertarian themes culminated in his 1943 work Yankee Hobo in the Orient. They spent several months traveling across the country in Patric's automobile to observe the effects of the Great Depression on the nation and to exchange ideas. The trip culminated in a two-month stay in Bellingham, Washington.

In the early 1940s, despite continuing requests from editors for both fiction and non-fiction material, Lane turned away from commercial fiction writing, save for her collaboration on her mother's books. At this time, she became known among libertarians as influential in the movement. She vehemently opposed the New Deal, eschewed "creeping socialism", Social Security, wartime rationing, and all forms of taxation. Lane ceased writing highly paid commercial fiction to protest paying income taxes. Living on a small salary from her newspaper column and no longer needing to support her parents or adopted sons, she cut expenses to the bare minimum, living a modern-day version of her ancestors' pioneer life on her rural land near Danbury. She gained some media attention for her refusal to accept a ration card, instead working cooperatively with her rural neighbors to grow and preserve fruits and vegetables and to raise chickens and pigs for meat. Literary critic and political writer Isabel Paterson had urged Lane to move to Connecticut, where she would be only "up country a few miles" from Paterson, who had been a friend for many years.

After experiencing it firsthand in the Soviet Union during her travels with the Red Cross, Lane was a staunch opponent of communism. As a result, Lane's initial writings on individualism and conservative government began while she was still writing popular fiction in the 1930s, culminating with The Discovery of Freedom (1943). After this point, Lane promoted and wrote about individual freedom and its impact on humanity. The same year also saw the publication of Paterson's The God of the Machine and Ayn Rand's novel The Fountainhead. Because of these writings, the three women have been referred to as the founding mothers of the American libertarian movement.

Writer Albert Jay Nock wrote that Lane and Paterson's nonfiction works were "the only intelligible books on the philosophy of individualism that have been written in America this century". The two women had "shown the male world of this period how to think fundamentally...[T]hey don't fumble and fiddle around – every shot goes straight to the centre". Journalist John Chamberlain credits Rand, Paterson and Lane with his final "conversion" from socialism to what he called "an older American philosophy" of libertarian and conservative ideas.

In 1943, Lane came into the national spotlight through her response to a radio poll on Social Security. She mailed in a post-card with a response likening the Social Security system to a Ponzi scheme that would, she felt, ultimately destroy the United States. Wartime monitoring of mail eventually resulted in a Connecticut State Trooper being dispatched to her home to question her motives. Her strong response to this infringement on her right of free speech resulted in a flurry of newspaper articles and the publishing of a pamphlet, "What is this, the Gestapo?", that was meant to remind Americans to be watchful of their rights despite the wartime exigencies. The pamphlet was distributed by the National Economic Council, Inc, an anti-Semitic organization that supported the fascist government in Spain, despite the fact that Lane herself wrote stridently against anti-Semitism and other forms of racism. During this time period, an FBI file was compiled on Lane.

As Lane aged, her political opinions solidified as a stalwart libertarian. Her defense of what she considered to be basic American principles of liberty and freedom were seen by some as harsh and abrasive in the face of disagreement. It is documented that during this time period that she broke with her old friend and political ally Isabel Paterson in 1946. During this time period and into the 1950s, Lane also had an acrimonious correspondence with socialist writer Max Eastman.

== Later years and death ==
Lane played a hands-on role during the 1940s and 1950s in launching the libertarian movement and began an extensive correspondence with figures such as DuPont executive Jasper Crane and writer Frank Meyer as well as her friend and colleague Ayn Rand. She wrote book reviews for the National Economic Council and later for the Volker Fund, out of which grew the Institute for Humane Studies. Later, she lectured at and gave generous financial support to the Freedom School headed by libertarian Robert LeFevre.

With her mother's death in 1957, ownership of the Rocky Ridge Farm house reverted to the farmer who had earlier bought the property on a life lease, allowing her to remain in residence. The local population put together a non-profit corporation to purchase the house and its grounds for use as a museum. After some wariness at the notion of seeing the house rather than the books themselves be a shrine to Lane's mother, she came to believe that making it into a museum would draw long-lasting attention to the books and sustain the theme of individualism she and her mother wove into the series. She donated the money needed to purchase the house and make it a museum, agreed to make significant contributions each year for its upkeep and also gave many of the family's belongings to the group. Lane's lifetime inheritance of Wilder's growing Little House royalties enabled her to again travel extensively and thoroughly renovated and remodeled her Connecticut home. Also during the 1960s, she revived her own commercial writing career by publishing several popular magazine series, including one about her tour of the Vietnam War zone in late 1965.

In later years, Lane wrote a book detailing the history of American needlework for Woman's Day. She edited and published On the Way Home, providing an autobiographical setting around her mother's original 1894 diary of their six-week journey from South Dakota to Missouri. Intended to serve as the capstone to the Little House series, the book was the result of Wilder's fans who were writing to Lane asking "what happened next?". She contributed book reviews to the William Volker Fund and continued to work on revisions of The Discovery of Freedom, which she never completed.

Lane was the adoptive grandmother and mentor to Roger Lea MacBride, later the Libertarian Party's 1976 candidate for president. The son of one of her editors with whom she formed a close bond when he was a boy, Lane later stated she was grooming him to be a future Libertarian thought leader. In addition to being her close friend, MacBride became her attorney and business manager and ultimately the heir to the Little House series and the multimillion-dollar franchise that he built around it after her death.

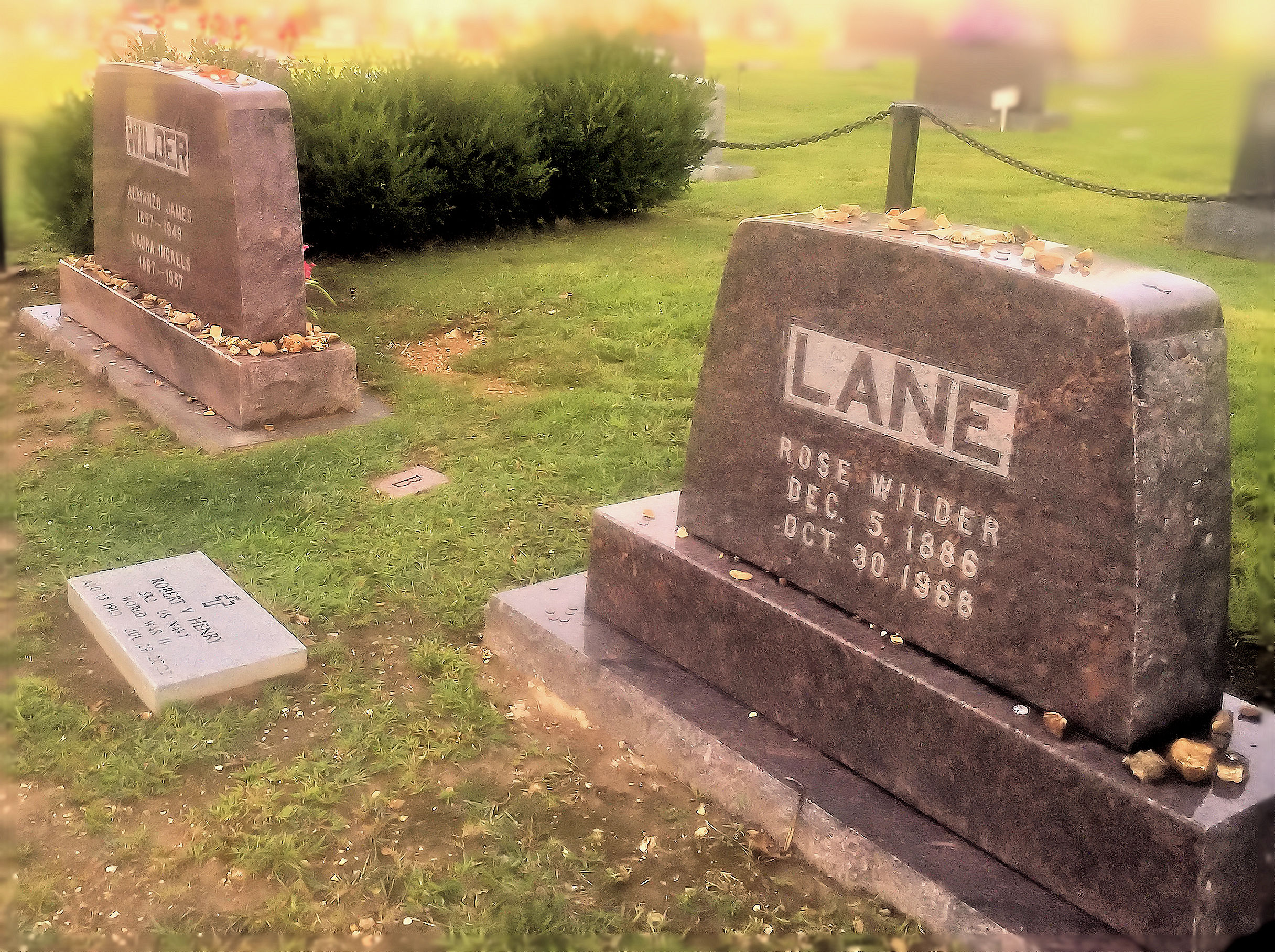
Lane's gravesite next to that of her parents in the Mansfield Cemetery, Missouri

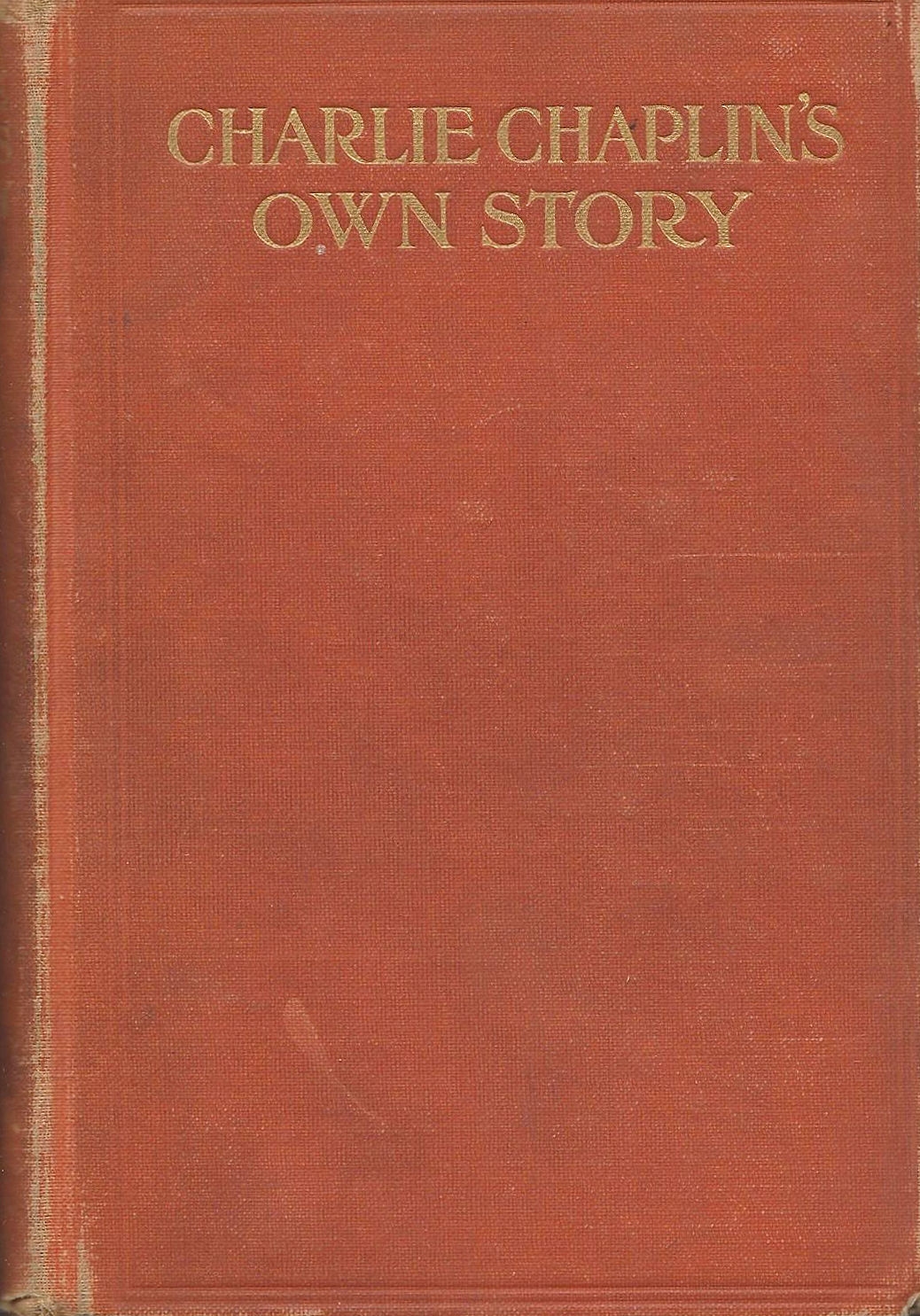
Her withdrawn "As Told To" 1916 Charlie Chaplin biography

The last of the protégés to be taken under Lane's wing was the sister of her Vietnamese interpreter. Impressed by the young girl's intelligence, Lane helped to bring her to the United States and sponsored her enrollment in college.

Lane died in her sleep at age 81 on October 30, 1968, just as she was about to depart on a three-year world tour. She was buried next to her parents at Mansfield Cemetery in Mansfield, Missouri.

== In the media ==
Lane was portrayed in the television adaptations of Little House on the Prairie by:

- Jennifer and Sarah E. Coleman (seasons 8–9), Jennifer and Michele Steffin (post-series movies) in the Little House on the Prairie TV series
- Terra Allen (part 1) and Skye McCole Bartusiak, Christina Stojanovich (part 2), in the miniseries Beyond the Prairie: The True Story of Laura Ingalls Wilder.

There are eight novels written by MacBride, telling of her childhood and early youth. Despite assertions of the accuracy of the locations, dates and people mentioned, there is heavy debate on the degree of authenticity. At least some events may be accurately represented as he was a close friend of hers.

In the novel Pioneer Girl by Bich Minh Nguyen, a young Vietnamese-American Lee Lien researches Lane's life based on an old family story. Lee's grandfather claims that Lane became friendly with the family while visiting Vietnam in 1965 and gave them a gold brooch, suspected to be the one Almanzo gave to Laura as described in These Happy Golden Years.

In the novel A Wilder Rose by Susan Wittig Albert, Lane tells the story of her work on the Little House books and her years at the Wilder farm (1928–1935) to Norma Lee Browning, a young friend. The novel is based on Lane's diaries and journals of the period and letters exchanged with her mother.

In the alternate history novel The Probability Broach by L. Neil Smith in which the United States becomes a libertarian state in 1794 after a successful Whiskey Rebellion and the overthrowing and execution of George Washington by firing squad for treason, Lane served as the 21st president of the North American Confederacy from 1940 to 1952.

== Bibliography ==
- The Story of Art Smith (1915, biography)
- Charlie Chaplin's Own Story (1916, biography)
- Henry Ford's Own Story (1917, biography)
- Diverging Roads (1919, fiction)
- White Shadows on the South Seas (assisted Frederick O'Brien, 1919, non-fiction travel)
- The Making of Herbert Hoover (1920, biography)
- The Peaks of Shala (1923, non-fiction travel)
- Children of Ararat (assisted Mabel Evelyn Elliott, 1924, non-fiction memoir)
- He Was a Man (1925, fiction)
- Hill-Billy (1925, fiction)
- Gordon Blake (1925, British edition of He Was a Man, fiction)
- Cindy; a romance of the Ozarks (1928, fiction)
- Let the Hurricane Roar (1932, fiction), better known as Young Pioneers
- Old Home Town (1935, fiction)
- Give Me Liberty (1936)
- Credo (1936) shorter version of Give Me Liberty published in Saturday Evening Post
- Free Land (1938, fiction)
- The Discovery of Freedom: Man's Struggle against Authority (1943, political history) adapted in 1947 as The Mainspring of Human Progress
- "What Is This: The Gestapo?" (1943, pamphlet)
- "On the Way Home" (1962)
- The Woman's Day Book of American Needlework (1963)
- Travels With Zenobia: Paris to Albania by Model T Ford (1983, with Helen Dore Boylston), ed. William Holtz ISBN 978-0826203908
- The Rediscovered Writings of Rose Wilder-Lane, Literary Journalist (2007, ed. Amy Mattson Lauters)
