= Francis J. Heyden =

American Jesuit priest and astronomer

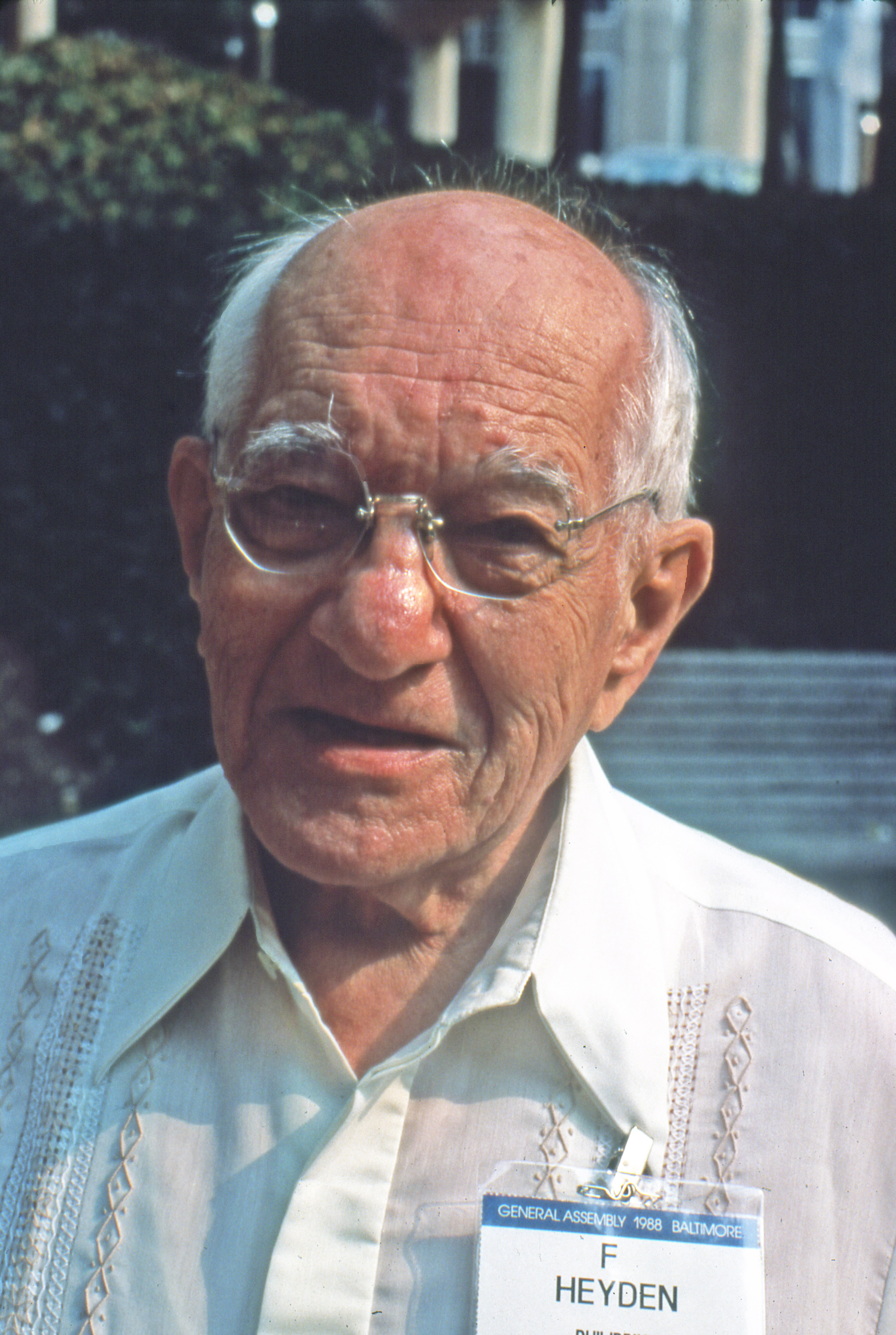
Francis Heyden in 1988

Father Francis J. Heyden (May 3, 1907 in Buffalo, New York – February 8, 1991 in Manila, Philippines), was an American Jesuit priest and astronomer. He served as Director of the Georgetown University Observatory from 1950 to 1972. After the Georgetown Observatory was closed he moved to the Manila Observatory.

== Early life and education ==
He was born in Buffalo, New York in 1907. His father was a pharmacist who died early as a result of a baseball injury. His mother left with him had his older a brother as teenagers. He graduated from Canisius High School in Buffalo. he attended Woodstock College in Maryland where he earned a A.B. degree in 1930, and a Master's in 1931.

He entered the Society of Jesus in 1924 directly after graduating from Canisius.

After graduation from Woodstock College, he accepted an appointment at the Astronomical Division of the Manila Observatory in the Philippines where he served until 1934. He then returned to Woodstock and completed his theological studies and was ordained as a Jesuit priest in 1938.

He entered Harvard University to complete a master's in Astronomy in 1942, and completed a Ph.D. in 1944. He was also a teaching fellow during that time, and did post-doctoral research with Cecilia Payne-Gaposchkin and Bart Bok.

== Georgetown Observatory ==
Heyden had planned to return to Manila but the war made this impossible. He took a post at Georgetown University in Washington D.C. as an assistant professor in 1945 under the director Fr. Paul A. McNally. He was appointed to be the observatories director in 1948. He undertook seven expeditions to photograph and investigate solar eclipses in Brazil, Chain, Iran, the Sudan and the US.

He was a Ph.D. supervisor to John P. Hagen and was director while Vera Rubin studied there.

== Later life ==
The directors of Georgetown closed the observatory in 1972, and he returned to Manila to continue work in solar spectroscopy. It was there that he died and was buried.
