= Reportedly haunted locations in Washington =

Reportedly haunted locations in Washington may refer to:

- Reportedly haunted locations in Washington (state)
- Reportedly haunted locations in Washington, D.C.
