= Reportedly haunted locations in Washington, D.C. =

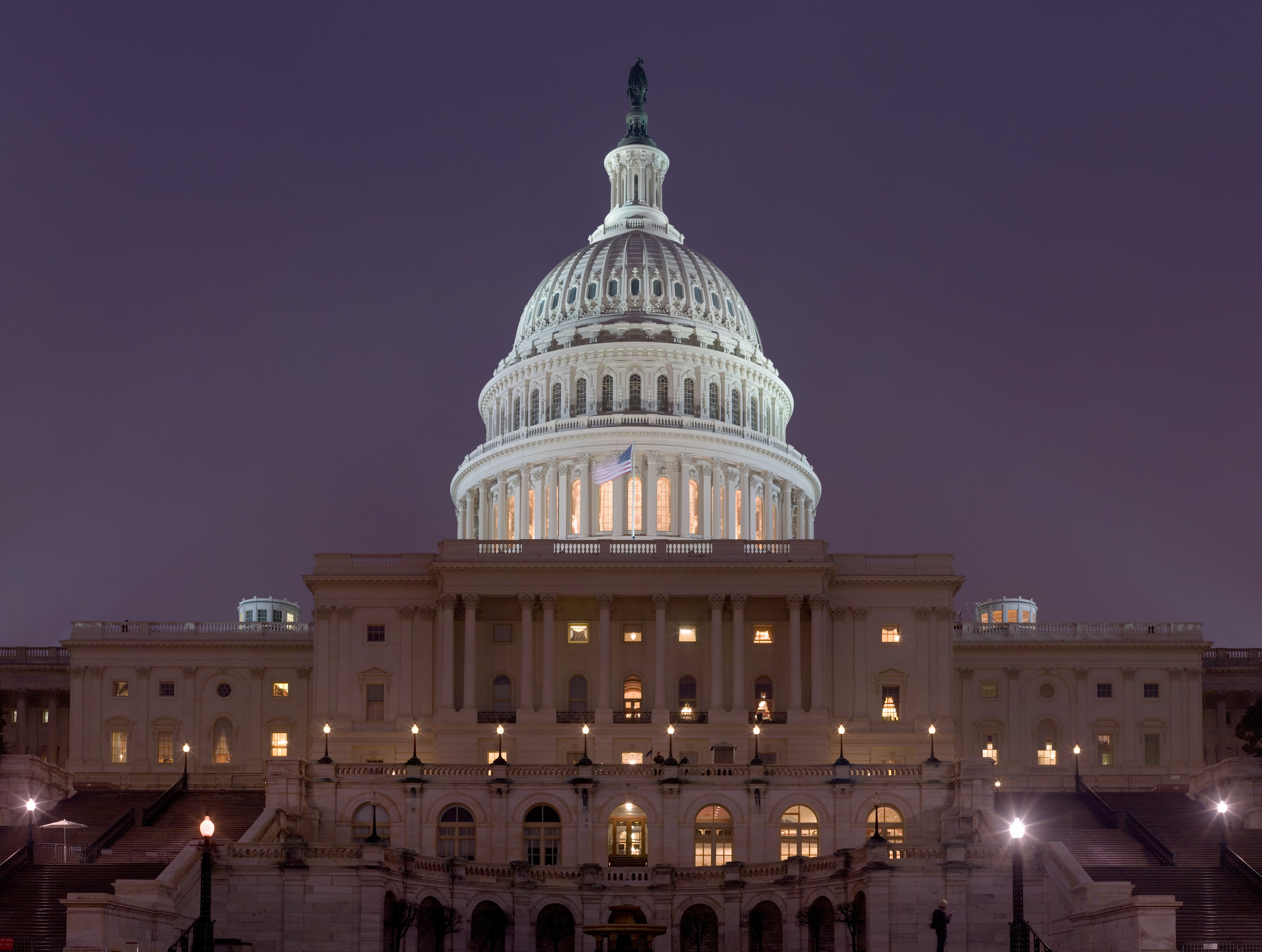
The United States Capitol, one of many places in Washington said to be haunted

Being the site of military battles, deadly duels, assassinations, untimely deaths, and other associated tragedies, there are a number of reportedly haunted locations in Washington, D.C., the capital city of the United States.

Washington's haunted history is so well known that some of its haunted locations were featured in a 2006 documentary, America's Haunted Houses, on the A&E cable network. Novelist Dan Brown mentioned them prominently in his 2009 novel, The Lost Symbol. Notable purportedly haunted locations include the United States Capitol, Capitol Hill, the White House, Lafayette Square and nearby buildings, Independence Avenue SW, The Octagon House, Chinatown, the National Theatre, Hay–Adams Hotel, Woodrow Wilson House, Omni Shoreham Hotel, and many others.

The U.S. Capitol is reputedly haunted by many past representatives and government officials, officers who served during the American Revolutionary War, workers who died during its construction and a "demon black cat" that is said to make appearances just before national tragedies or changes in presidential administration. Apparitions of deceased presidents have been reported in the White House, the most famous of which is Abraham Lincoln's ghost, reported by first lady Grace Coolidge, president Harry S. Truman, and British prime minister Winston Churchill, and apparitions of presidents Thomas Jefferson, Andrew Jackson, and John Tyler have all been witnessed, as have the spirits of many First Ladies.

The President's Park, Lafayette Park, and nearby buildings are reported to be home to ghosts such as Philip Barton Key II and Stephen Decatur who died there following pistol duels. The Octagon is supposedly one of the most haunted buildings in D.C., with sightings of its past occupants and African American slaves who once worked there. The National Theatre is said to be haunted by the ghost of actor John McCullough, who was murdered in the 1880s by a fellow thespian. Hay–Adams Hotel is claimed to be host to the ghost of Marian "Clover" Hooper Adams, the wife of Henry Brooks Adams, the celebrated 19th-century American journalist, historian and novelist, who was the grandson of John Quincy Adams, and the Woodrow Wilson House is allegedly haunted by former president Woodrow Wilson himself who spent his final years in illness there before dying in his bedroom in 1924. Houses in the Georgetown area of the city are reported to be haunted by figures from colonial times, including slaves, merchants and children. Staff and guests of the Omni Shoreham Hotel have told of stories of faint voices, cold breezes, and doors slamming shut and opening and televisions and lights turning on and off of their own accord.

== Capitol Hill ==
=== The Capitol ===
The United States Capitol is considered one of the most haunted buildings in Washington, D.C. The first apparition to be seen there was in the 1860s as the Capitol was being completed. Several spirits are said to haunt the Capitol due to tragedies associated with its construction. One such ghost is said to be that of a worker who died after a fall during the construction of the rotunda, and who now is occasionally seen floating beneath the dome carrying a tray of woodworking tools. Another spirit is allegedly a stonemason who died (crushed to death beneath a wall which collapsed, or murdered by a co-worker) and is seen in the Old Senate chambers or passing through a wall in the basement beneath the Senate.

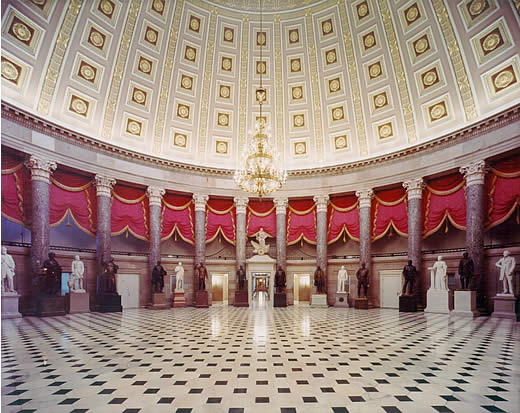
National Statuary Hall, said to be haunted by a number of former members of Congress

Many politicians with strong personalities and a powerful attachment to the institution of Congress are reputed still to roam the halls of Congress long after their deaths. The shades of Representative Joseph Cannon (R-Ill. and Speaker from 1903 to 1911) and Rep. Champ Clark (D-Mo. and Speaker from 1911 to 1919) are claimed to occasionally return to the dark chamber of the House of Representatives after midnight and, after a loud rap from a gavel, resume the strong, angry debates they once had in life. Members of the United States Capitol Police have claimed to have seen Senator (and from 1852 to 1854, Representative) Thomas Hart Benton sitting at a desk in National Statuary Hall, although it has not been used as a legislative chamber since 1857. Steve Livengood, chief tour guide for the United States Capitol Historical Society, says he has seen the ghost of former Representative Wilbur Mills (D-Ark.) near Mills' former office late at night. Pierre Charles L'Enfant, although not a politician, was a brevet Major during the American Revolutionary War who served with George Washington at Valley Forge. In 1791, L'Enfant was appointed architect and planner of the new city of Washington in the District of Columbia. Although L'Enfant submitted grandiose plans for the new capital city, his plans were never fully adopted and President Washington dismissed him. L'Enfant spent much of the rest of his life attempting to wrest a monetary payment from Congress, and he died in poverty in 1825. Eyewitnesses, however, claim to have seen his spirit walking through the Capitol, head down, murmuring to himself, with the plans for the capital city tucked under his arm.

The Capitol has also been witness to murder and death. Rep. William P. Taulbee had been a congressman from Kentucky from 1884 to 1888. Charles E. Kincaid, a journalist for The Louisville Times, had accused Taulbee of adultery and involvement in a Patent Office scandal, which had ruined Taulbee's political career. On February 28, 1890, the ex-congressman and the reporter ran into one another in the Capitol, and Taulbee assaulted and embarrassed Kincaid by tweaking the much smaller man's nose. Kincaid ran home, grabbed a pistol, and, when he encountered Taulbee on a marble staircase leading from the House chamber down to the dining room, shot him in the face just below Taulbee's left eye. Taulbee died two weeks later, and Kincaid was acquitted after claiming self-defense. Journalists and others claim that whenever a reporter slips on these steps, Taulbee's ghost briefly appears. Former President and then-Rep. John Quincy Adams suffered a stroke at his desk in the House chamber on February 21, 1848, and was taken into the Speaker's Room. His physical condition was too precarious to permit him to be moved, and he died at the Capitol two days later. Many people claim to have heard Adams' ghost denouncing slavery late at night in National Statuary Hall, and one Congressional staff member claims that by standing in the spot where Adams' desk once stood a person can still hear the former president's ghostly whisper. James A. Garfield was a member of the House from 1863 to 1881 before assuming the Presidency in March 1881. Garfield was shot by Charles J. Guiteau, a disgruntled office seeker, on July 2, 1881, at 9:30 a.m. as he walked through the Sixth Street Station of the Baltimore and Potomac Railroad in Washington, D.C. Garfield died of heart failure brought about by blood poisoning (itself caused by poor medical care) on September 19, 1881, while recuperating at a beach house near Long Branch, New Jersey. Witnesses have seen Garfield's specter walking solemnly through the halls of Congress.

Not all Capitol hauntings are related to people who worked there. The "Demon Cat" is alleged to prowl the halls of Congress, and make appearances just before a national tragedy or change in Presidential administration. It was first seen in the early part of the 19th century, and a night watchman shot at it in 1862. It has also been seen by other night watchmen and members of the Capitol Police. It appeared before the assassination of President Abraham Lincoln, the October 1929 stock market crash, and the assassination of President John F. Kennedy. The cat has not only been seen in the halls, but has repeatedly appeared in Washington's Tomb. The Tomb (two levels below the crypt beneath the Capitol Rotunda) was an original feature of the Capitol, planned as a resting place for George Washington and members of his family. The Washington family politely declined the offer. The Tomb stands empty, although from 1865 to 2009 (when it was moved to the United States Capitol Visitor Center) the Lincoln catafalque was stored there. The specters of at least two soldiers are also said to haunt the Capitol. A few eyewitnesses have claimed that whenever an individual lies in state in the Capitol Rotunda, a World War I doughboy momentarily appears, salutes, then disappears. A second apparition, which eyewitnesses say is the ghost of an American Revolutionary War soldier, has also appeared at the Washington Tomb. According to several stories, the soldier appears, moves around the Lincoln catafalque, and then passes out the door into the hallway before disappearing.

=== Capitol Hill ===
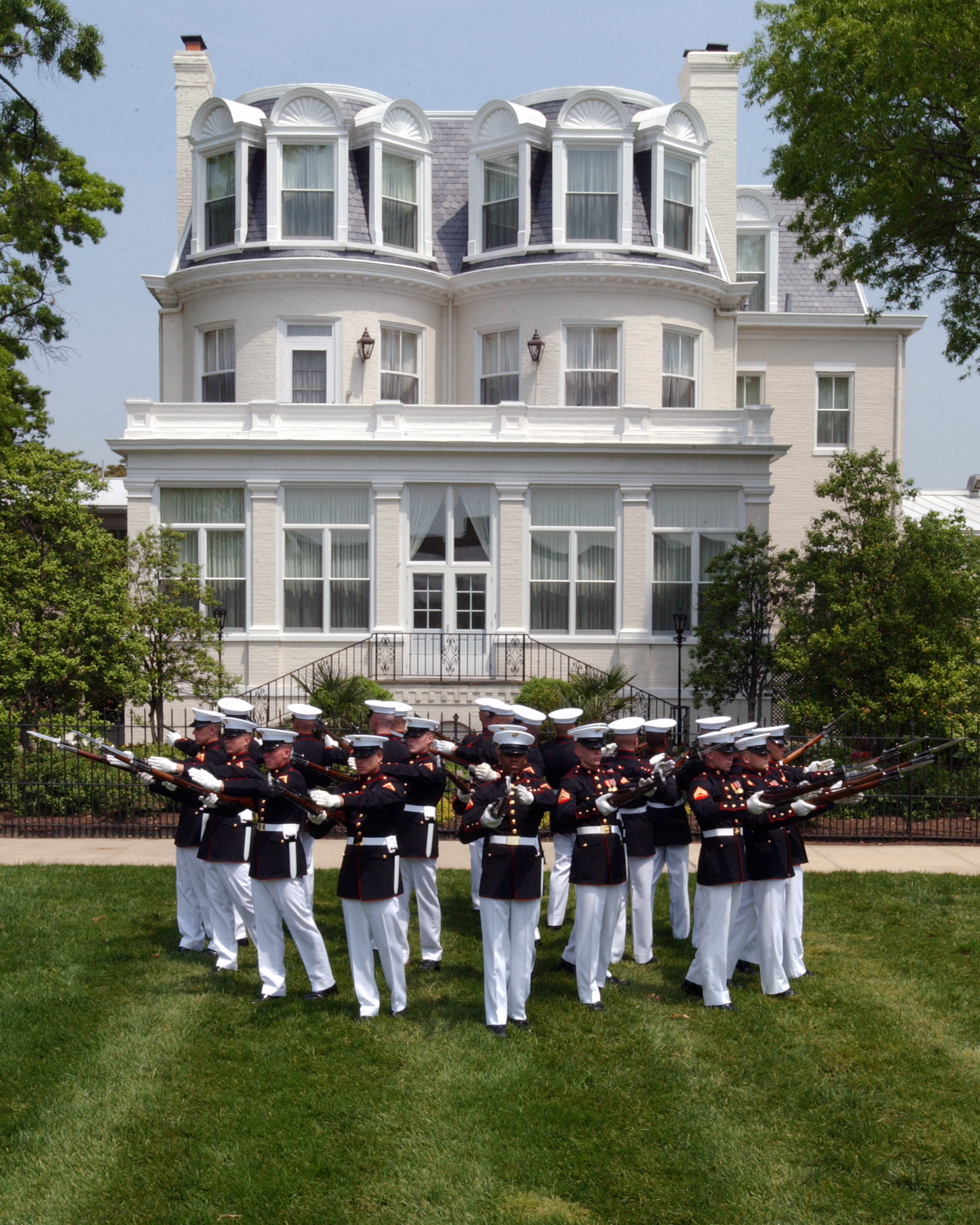
Commandant's House at the Marine Corps Barracks, allegedly haunted by the ghost of the first Commandant of the U.S. Marine Corps

Capitol Hill is one of the largest and most densely populated neighborhoods in Washington, D.C. It is bounded by F Street NE on the north and Southeast/Southwest Freeway on the south. The U.S. Capitol marks its western boundary, while the Anacostia River is its eastern limit. Although Capitol Hill has been home to many of the city's powerful, its hauntings appear to be few. One ghost, however, is said to haunt First Street NE. Joseph Holt was Judge Advocate General of the United States Army from 1862 to 1875. He presided over the trials of the Lincoln assassination conspirators. During the trials, accused conspirators Dr. Samuel Mudd (who treated John Wilkes Booth's broken leg) and Mary Surratt (at whose downtown boarding house the conspirators met) were held at the Old Capitol Prison opposite the U.S. Capitol (the modern day United States Supreme Court Building stands on the site today). After Holt retired, he allegedly became a recluse in his Capitol Hill home. Although the Holt house no longer exists, local residents have told stories of Holt's ghost walking down First Street NE in a blue suit and cape, pondering the guilt of Mudd and Surratt, as he heads for the site of the Old Capitol Prison.

Capitol Hill's other hauntings are associated with the two military installations in that part of the city. At the official residence of the Commandant of the Marine Corps Barracks and Parade Ground on 8th Street SE, there are stories which talk about rustling papers, the sound of a man pacing, and the appearance of the ghostly image of Samuel Nicholas, the first Commandant of the Marine Corps. At the nearby Washington Navy Yard at 8th Street SE and M Street SE, the ghost of Commodore Thomas Tingey is said to stare out of the upper windows of the Tingey House (the traditional residence of the Commander of the Navy Yard). Local residents and press reports also tell stories about "Old Howard", a cantankerous former U.S. Marine who lived in the 1860s in a two-story house between G and I Streets SE, and now haunts it, harassing the occupants and acting much like a poltergeist.

== White House and President's Park ==
=== White House ===
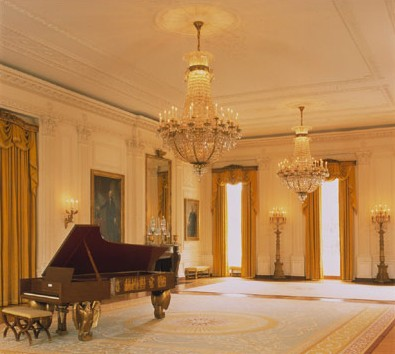
The East Room of the White House, where Abigail Adams once hung her laundry and where her spirit may still appear

The White House is the oldest building on President's Park. An integral part of the planned city that is Washington, D.C., a design was chosen and construction begun in 1792, and the building (although unfinished) was opened for occupancy on November 1, 1800. The first people to occupy the building were President John Adams and his wife, Abigail. Parts of the mansion were unfinished, including the cavernous East Room. With no running water (it was not installed until 1834), water had to be brought into the house by jug and heated for bathing or laundry to be done. Abigail Adams often hung the family's laundry up to dry in the drafty East Room. The ghost of Abigail Adams has been seen since shortly after her death in 1818, arms extended as if she were still carrying laundry into the East Room, accompanied by the smell of soap or damp clothing. Household staff in the Taft administration even observed her walking through walls.

==== Abraham Lincoln ====
Abraham Lincoln

The White House's most famous alleged apparition is that of Abraham Lincoln. First Lady Eleanor Roosevelt never admitted to having seen Lincoln's ghost, but did say that she felt his presence repeatedly throughout the White House. Roosevelt also said that the family dog, Fala, would sometimes bark for no reason at what she felt was Lincoln's ghost. President Dwight Eisenhower's press secretary, James Hagerty, and Liz Carpenter, press secretary to First Lady Lady Bird Johnson, both said they felt Lincoln's presence many times. The former president's footsteps are also said to be heard in the hall outside the Lincoln Bedroom. As reputable an eyewitness as Lillian Rogers Parks admitted in her 1961 autobiography My Thirty Years Backstairs at the White House that she had heard them. Margaret Truman, daughter of President Harry S. Truman, said she heard a specter rapping at the door of the Lincoln Bedroom when she stayed there, and believed it was Lincoln. President Truman himself was once wakened by raps at the door while spending a night in the Lincoln Bedroom. Others have actually seen an apparition of the former president. The first person reported to have actually seen Lincoln's spirit was First Lady Grace Coolidge, who said she saw the ghost of Lincoln standing at a window in the Yellow Oval Room staring out at the Potomac. Winston Churchill, Theodore Roosevelt, and Maureen Reagan and her husband have all claimed to have seen a spectral Lincoln in the White House. A number of staff members of the Franklin D. Roosevelt administration claimed to have seen Lincoln's spirit, and on one occasion Roosevelt's personal valet ran screaming from the White House claiming he had seen Lincoln's ghost. Perhaps the most famous incident was in 1942 when Queen Wilhelmina of the Netherlands heard footsteps outside her White House bedroom and answered a knock on the door, only to see Lincoln in frock coat and top hat standing in front of her; she promptly fainted. Several unnamed eyewitnesses have claimed to have seen the shade of Abraham Lincoln actually lying down on the bed in the Lincoln Bedroom (which was used as a meeting room at the time of his administration), and others have seen Lincoln sit on the edge of the bed and put his boots on. The most famous eyewitness to the latter was Mary Eben, Eleanor Roosevelt's secretary, who saw Lincoln pulling on his boots (after which she ran screaming from the room).

The last sighting of Lincoln's ghost was in the early 1980s, when Tony Savoy, White House operations foreman, came into the White House and saw Lincoln sitting in a chair at the top of some stairs.

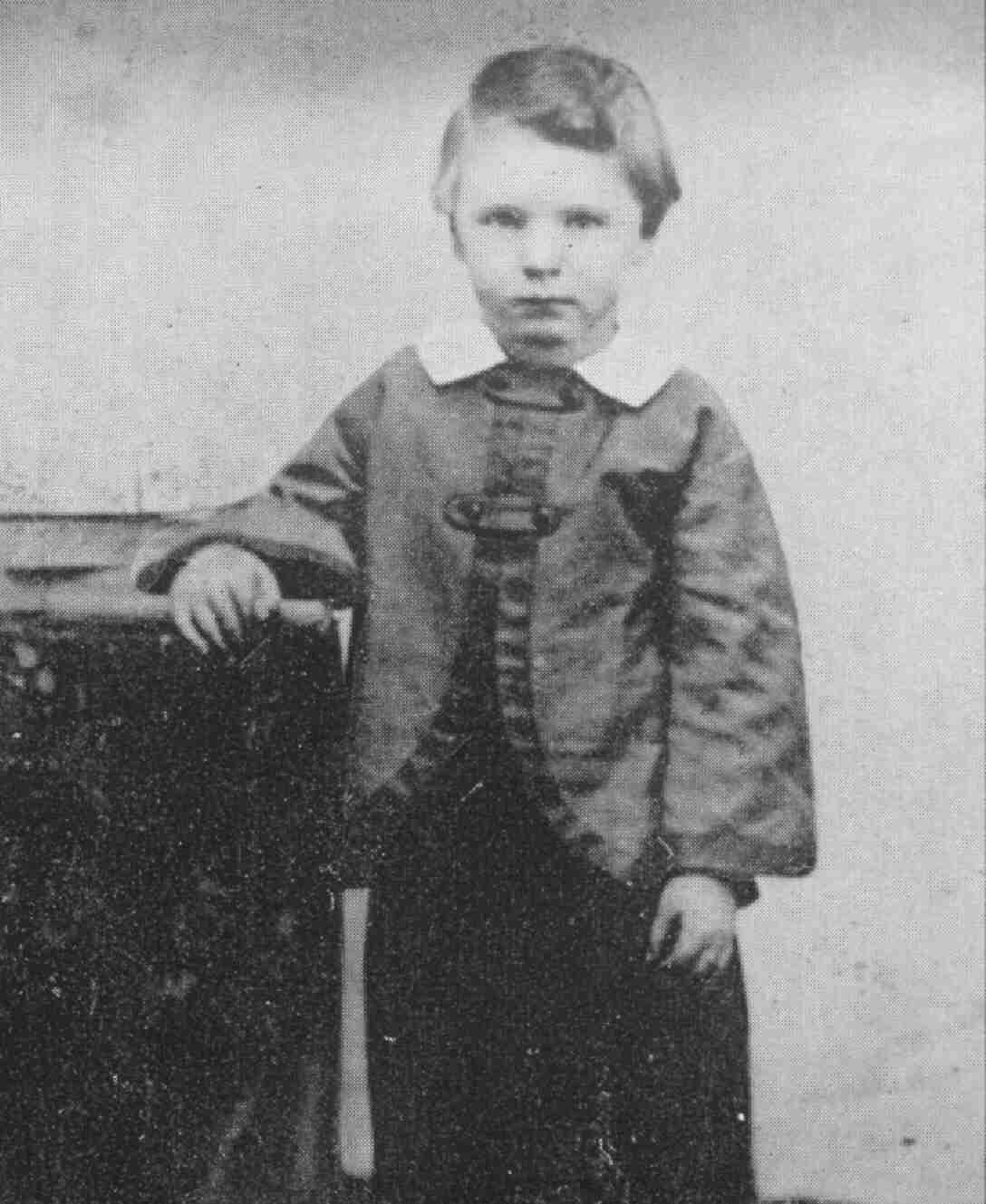
Willie Lincoln, who died in the White House during his father's presidency

Abraham Lincoln is not the only Lincoln ghost witnesses claim to have seen in the White House. Willie Lincoln, Abraham Lincoln's 11-year-old son, died of typhoid in the White House on February 20, 1862. Willie Lincoln's ghost was first seen in the White House by staff members of the Grant administration in the 1870s, but has appeared as recently as the 1960s (President Lyndon B. Johnson's college-age daughter, Lynda Bird Johnson Robb, saw the ghost and claims to have talked to him).

==== Other presidents ====
Other presidents, as well as First Ladies, are also said to haunt the White House. Witnesses in the past two centuries have reported that Thomas Jefferson can be heard playing his violin in the Yellow Oval Room. President Andrew Jackson is said to be seen lying on what is thought to be his old bed in the Queens' Bedroom (also known as the Rose Room), and his guttural laugh has been heard in the White House since the beginning of the 1860s. First Lady press secretary Liz Carpenter heard the laugh and swore it was Jackson's, and Mary Todd Lincoln claimed to have heard the stomping and swearing of an invisible presence which she claimed was the uncouth Jackson. White House seamstress Lillian Rogers Parks said she was sewing in the Queen's Bedroom and felt a presence, cold air, and then a hand on the back of her chair. She quickly left the room, and for the rest of her time in the White House she refused to enter the room again without at least one other person accompanying her. The spirit of William Henry Harrison, it is claimed, haunts the attic, and President John Tyler allegedly haunts the Blue Room. First Lady Frances Folsom Cleveland, who was married to President Grover Cleveland in the White House's Blue Room in 1886, is widely claimed to haunt the room where she was married and was seen there after her death in 1947.

==== Non-residents ====
The White House is also said to be visited by three specters who did not live there. The first is that of David Burnes, who owned the ground on which the White House stands before selling it to the federal government in May 1791, and whose spirit has been seen in Oval Office. A reporter told a security guard during the Truman administration that, while standing in the Yellow Oval Room, he heard a faint ghostly voice which said, "I'm Mr. Burns." The second spirit is allegedly that of a British soldier dressed in a uniform from the War of 1812 and carrying a torch. In August 1814, a combined British land and naval force captured Washington, D.C., and set fire to the White House, Treasury Building, Capitol, and other buildings in retaliation for the American looting of York, Upper Canada (now the city of Toronto) and the burning of the Parliament Buildings of Upper Canada after the Battle of York in 1813. The fires were put out only when a hurricane and tornado passed through Washington the following day, extinguishing the blazes. The soldier is claimed to be one of those who burned the White House, or who lost his life the following day in the storm. Another shade alleged to visit the White House is the ghost of Anna Surratt, daughter of convicted Lincoln assassination co-conspirator Mary Surratt, who forced her way into the White House the night before her mother's execution and unsuccessfully begged for her mother's life. It is claimed by some White House staff that Anna's ghost returns to the White House every July 6, silently banging on the front door to seek entrance and continue her futile pleas for her mother's life.

=== President's Park and nearby buildings ===
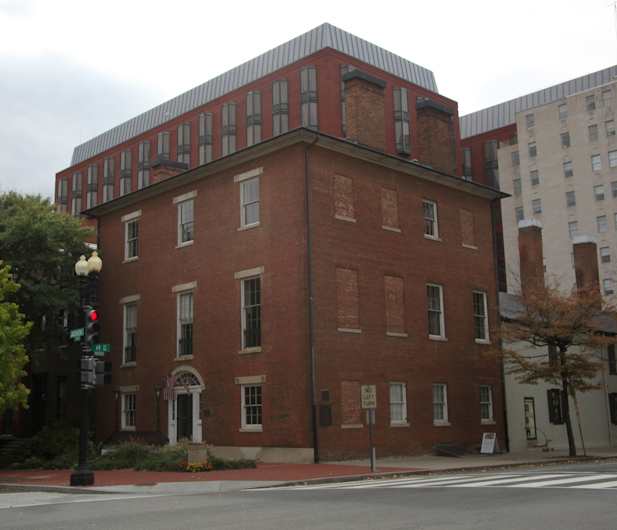
Decatur House on Lafayette Square, showing the bricked-up window out of which the ghost of Stephen Decatur is said to stare

President's Park, better known as Lafayette Square, may have its own spectral resident. Philip Barton Key II was the son of Francis Scott Key and the nephew of Chief Justice Roger B. Taney. In the spring of 1858, Key began having an affair with Teresa Bagioli Sickles, the wife of his friend Daniel Sickles. On February 26, 1859, Sickles learned of the affair. The following day, he saw Key in Lafayette Square signalling to his wife. Sickles rushed out into the park, drew a pistol, and shot the unarmed Key three times while the other man pleaded for his life. Key was taken into the nearby Benjamin Ogle Tayloe House and died moments later. Key's spirit, eyewitnesses and authors claim, now haunts Lafayette Square and can be seen on dark nights near the spot where he was shot.

Decatur House (748 Jackson Place NW) is allegedly haunted by the ghost of Stephen Decatur. In 1820, Commodore James Barron challenged Commodore Decatur to a duel over comments Decatur had made regarding Barron's conduct in the Chesapeake-Leopard Affair of 1807. The two men duelled on March 20, and Decatur was mortally wounded in the stomach. Decatur was rushed back to his home, and died there on March 22. A year after Decatur's death, his ghost reportedly began appearing at the house—standing in a second floor window looking out at H Street NW or leaving the back door of the house with a box of dueling pistols. So many witnesses saw the specter of Decatur that the window was walled up. Some people have also claimed that they can hear his widow, who became hysterical at his death, weeping in the house.

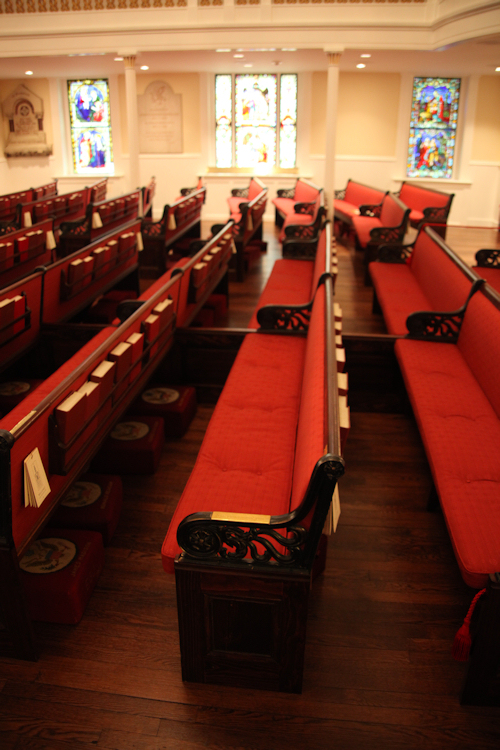
President's pew of St. John's Episcopal Church

St. John's Episcopal Church (1525 H Street NW), built in 1816, is the second-oldest structure on the President's Park. The church has a tradition of a "President's pew", which is reserved for the use of the President of the United States. The church's bell was purchased from the Revere Company of Boston (founded by Joseph Warren Revere, son of Paul Revere) and installed on November 30, 1822 (where it remains as of 2009). According to at least two accounts, whenever the bell tolls because of the death of a notable person, six ghostly men in white robes appear in the President's pew at midnight and then vanish.

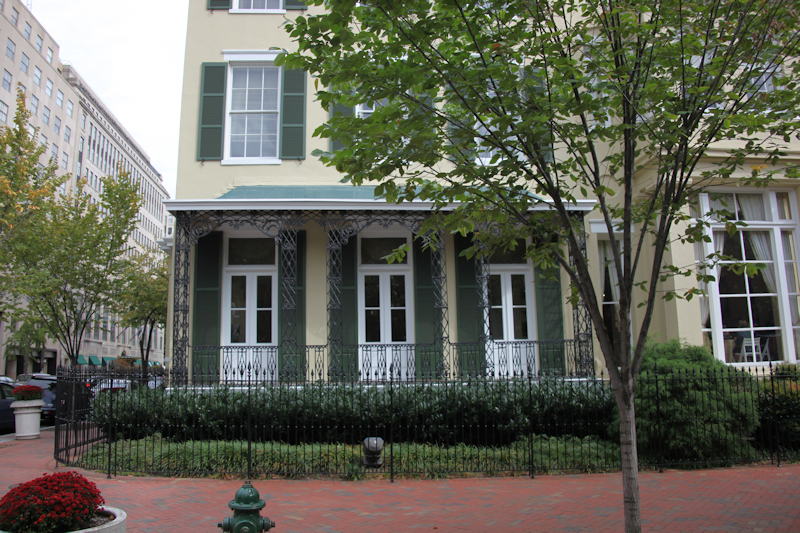
The west side of the Dolley Madison House, showing the porch (with black railing) where the shade of the former First Lady is said to rock on dark nights

The Cutts–Madison House (721 Madison Place NW), also known as the Dolley Madison House, was constructed in 1822 by Richard Cutts, brother-in-law of First Lady Dolley Madison. After ex-President James Madison died in 1836, Dolley Madison took up residency in the house and lived there until her death in 1849. Rear Admiral Charles Wilkes purchased the home in 1851. Wilkes moved the entrance from Madison Place NW to H Street NW, and turned the porch on the west side of the house (facing Madison Place NW) into a window. Witnesses from the mid-19th century onward have claimed to have seen the ghost of Dolley Madison rocking in a chair in the space where the porch used to be, smiling at passersby.

== Downtown ==
=== The Octagon House ===
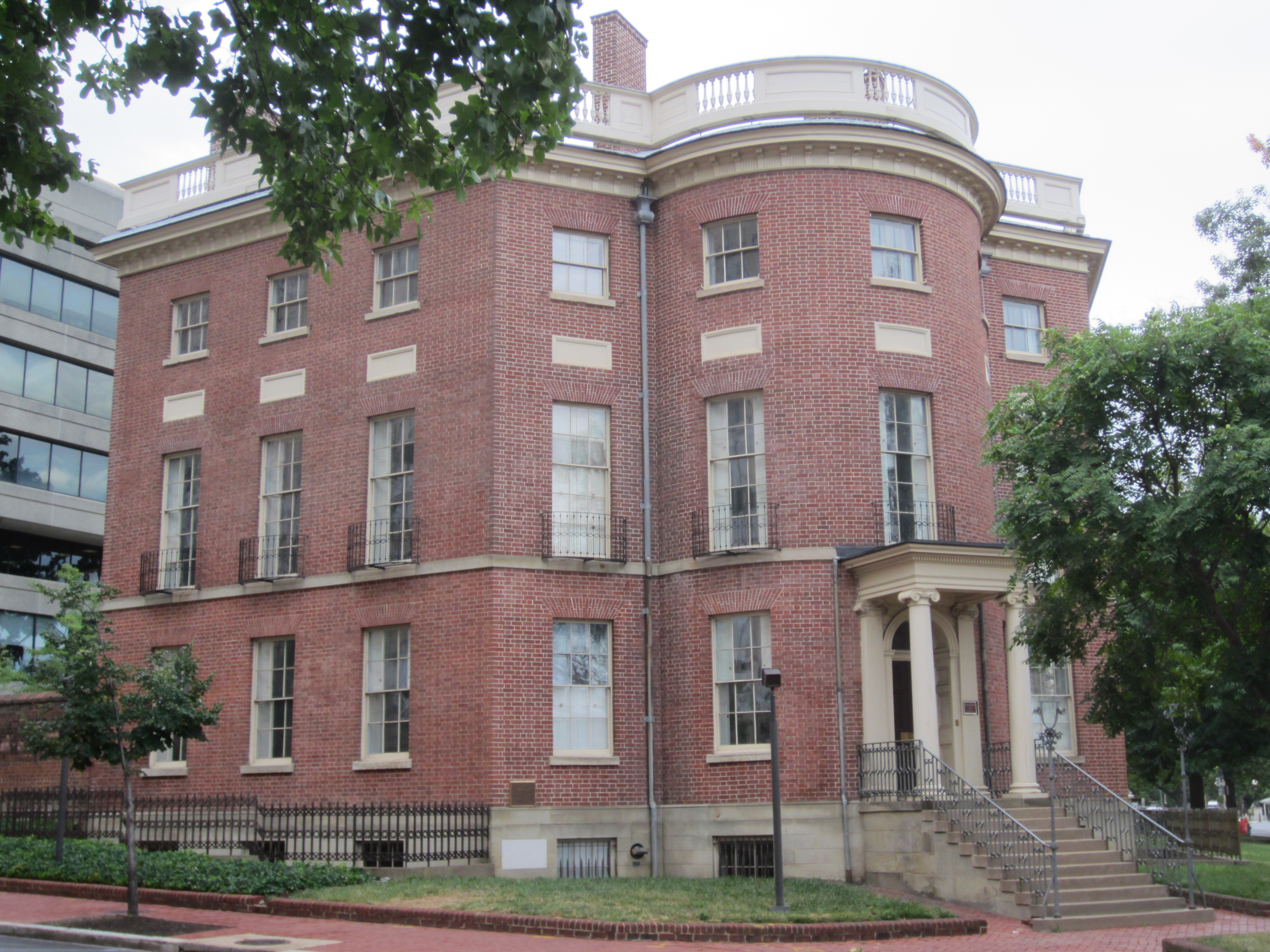
The Octagon is supposedly one of the most haunted buildings in D.C.

The Octagon House (1799 New York Avenue NW) is reported to be the most haunted home in D.C. It was built in 1801 by Colonel John Tayloe III. The Tayloes were a greatly distinguished Virginia family: His grandfather, Colonel John Tayloe (d. 1747), was a member of the King's Council in Virginia and owner of more than 3,000 acres (12 km^{2}) of land (a huge estate at the time), and his father, Colonel John Tayloe II, built the historic Mount Airy manor house in 1758 and was also a member of the King's Council. John Tayloe III was a close friend of George Washington's, and Washington convinced Tayloe to build a winter home in the new city of Washington. There is some evidence that the walled back yard of The Octagon itself may have served as a slave market, and it is well-established that the rear of the building housed the Tayloe family's slaves. The Tayloe family was exceptionally well-connected, and their home was an important one in the city. After the burning of the White House in the War of 1812, President James and Dolley Madison lived there from September 1814 to October 1815, and Madison signed the Treaty of Ghent (which ended the war) there in February 1815. Apparitions and the presence of otherworldly forces have been seen and felt in many places at The Octagon, including on the spiral staircase, the second floor landing, the third floor landing, the third floor bedroom, and the garden area in the rear. Among the eyewitnesses have been members of the public, and curators and other employees hired by the museum which owns the house. Two of Colonel Tayloe's daughters are said to haunt The Octagon. The first allegedly died before the War of 1812. Colonel Tayloe and his daughter quarreled on the second floor landing over the girl's relationship with a British officer stationed in the city. When the daughter turned in anger to go down the stairs, she fell down the stairs (or over the railing; stories differ) and died. Her specter is allegedly seen crumpled at the bottom of the steps or on the stairs near the second floor landing, and sometimes exhibits itself as the light of a candle moving up the staircase. The other death, stories claim, occurred in 1817 or shortly thereafter. Another of Colonel Tayloe's daughters eloped with a young man, incurring her father's wrath. When she returned home to reconcile with her father, they argued on the third-floor landing. This daughter, too, fell to her death down the stairs (or over the railing), and her shade is alleged to haunt the third floor landing and stairs between the second and third floors.

The Octagon is also believed by some to be haunted by the spirits of African American slaves who once lived there. When the house held bells to summon servants, the spirits of the dead slaves would announce their presence by ringing these bells loudly. The ghostly bell ringing first occurred in the 1870s. General George D. Ramsay, Chief of Ordnance for the United States Army and commander of the Washington Arsenal in Washington, D.C., was attending a dinner at The Octagon when all the bells in the house began ringing. As Marian Gouverneur, wife of Samuel Laurence Gouverneur, Jr. (the first American consul in Foo Chow, China), related the story, General Ramsay seized the bell ropes to stop the bells from sounding, but to everyone's shock they did not stop ringing. Although Gouverneur's report was not made until 1911, the mysterious ringing of the bells had been reported in 1874 and again in 1889, each time attributed to the spirits of dead slaves.

Other spirits are also said to remain at The Octagon as well. Dolley Madison's spirit has been seen near the fireplace in the main ballroom as well as heading through a closed door to the garden, and her ghost's presence is accompanied by the smell of lilacs, her favorite flower. A slave girl in the house was allegedly thrown from the third floor landing to the first floor below and killed by a British soldier during the War of 1812, and eyewitnesses have reported hearing her scream. The specter of a British soldier in War of 1812 dress was seen by caretaker James Cypress in the 1950s, and museum superintendent Alric H. Clay claimed that in the 1960s spirits would often turn on the lights and open The Octagon's doors late at night. A gambler shot to death in the house's third-floor bedroom in the late 19th century has sometimes been seen still in the bed he died in, and ghostly footmen have been seen at the front door waiting to receive guests. He was said to have rung a bell shortly before his death and that the ring of the bell often heard in the house is from him. Various witnesses have also reported hearing assorted moans, screams, and footsteps.

=== Independence Avenue SW ===
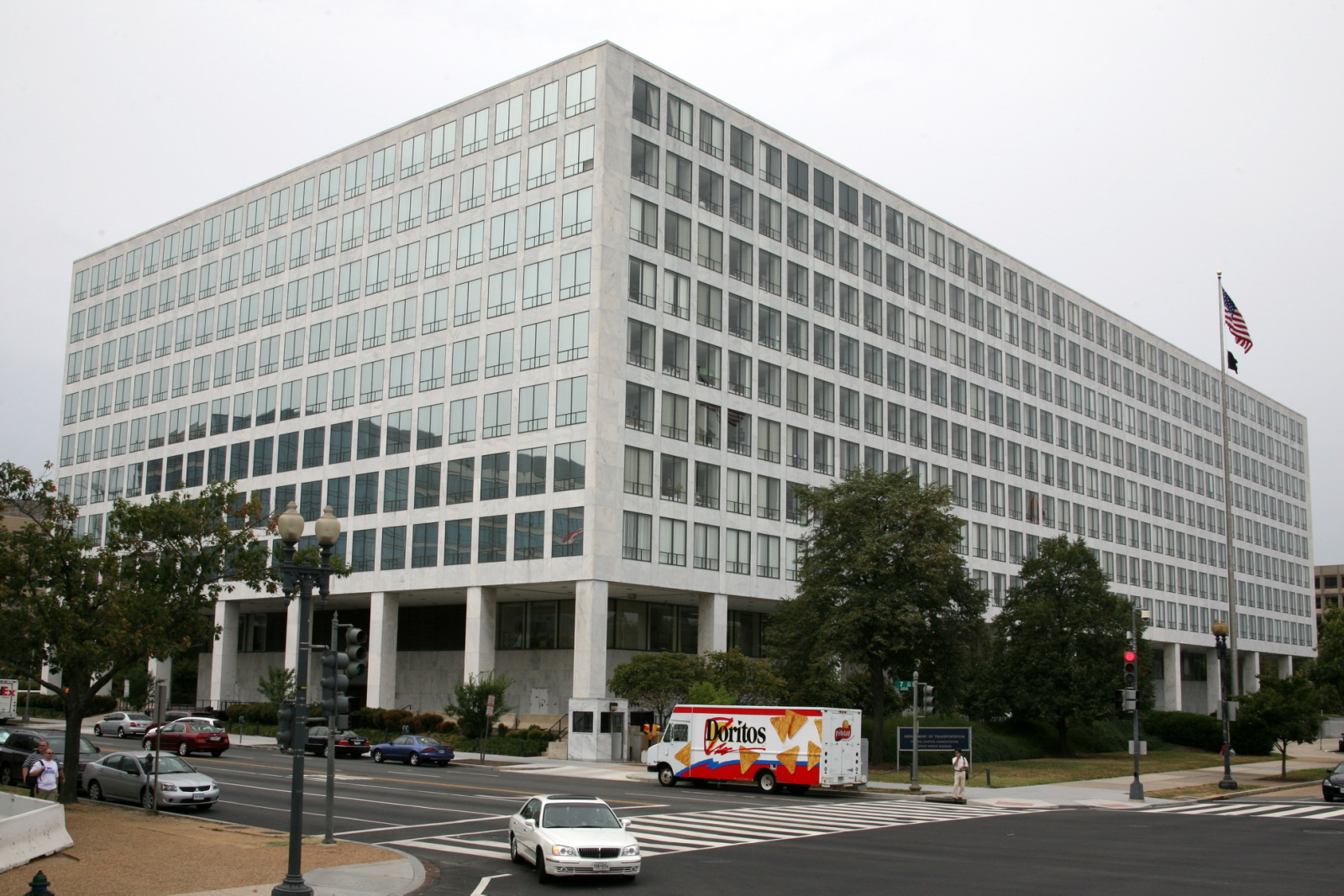
Wilbur Wright FAA HQ - probable site for Yellow House slave pen

The spirits of slaves are also said to haunt a portion of Independence Avenue SW, the site of two of the city's largest and most notorious slave markets. The Yellow House or Williams Slave Pen (at about 800 Independence Avenue SW, now the site of the headquarters of the Federal Aviation Administration) was the most notorious slave pen in the capital: A modest, well-maintained, two-story yellow house concealed a very large basement in which slaves were chained to walls in windowless rooms, while a 30 square feet (2.8 m^{2}) yard surrounded by a 12-foot (3.7 m) high brick wall provided space for the training and selling of slaves. Another large slave market, the Robey Slave Pen, was just a block away at the corner of 7th Street SW and Independence Avenue SW. On dark nights, witnesses say they have heard the clinking of chains and screams on Independence Avenue where these slave pens used to operate.

=== Chinatown ===
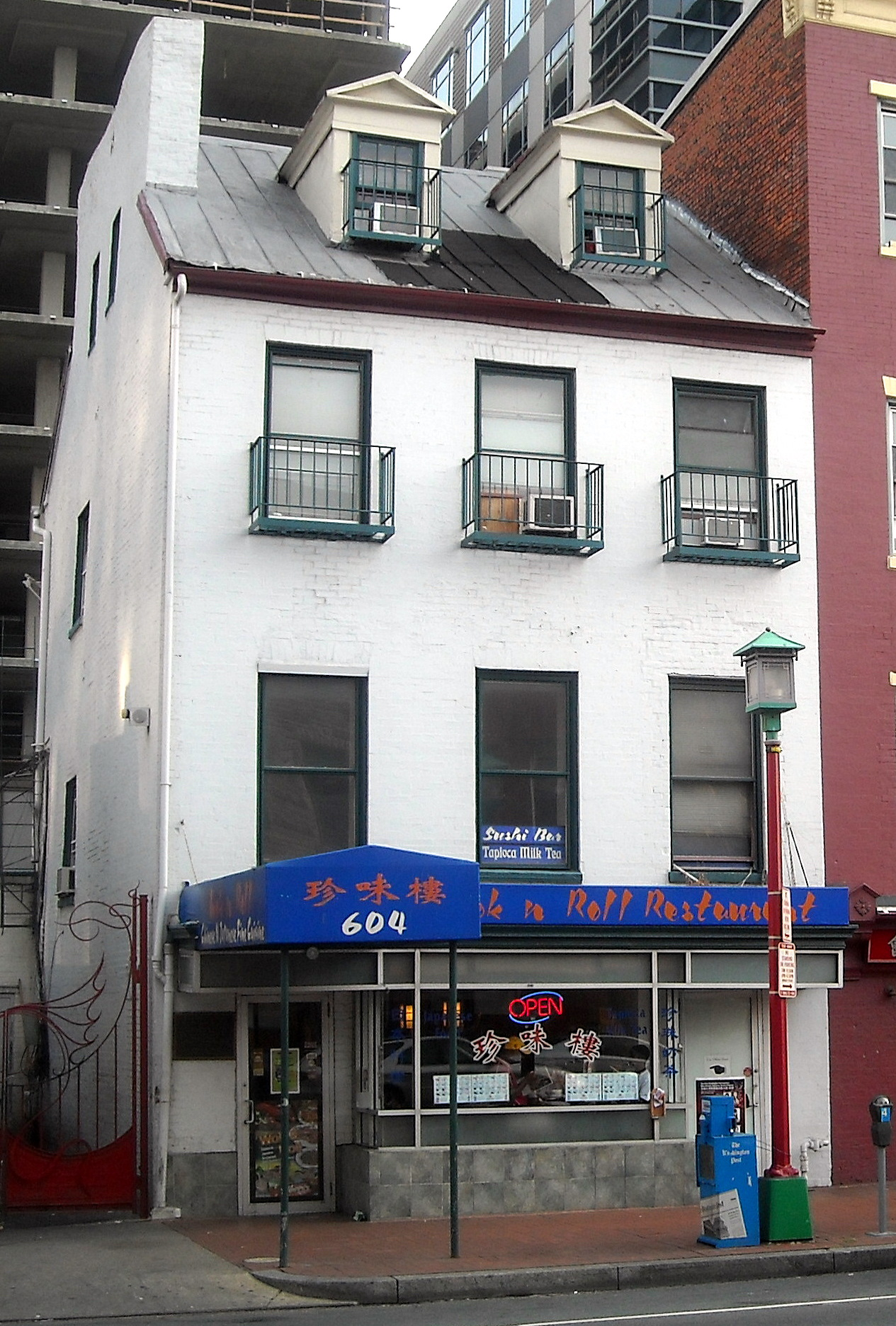
Mary Surratt's boarding house in Chinatown, Washington, D.C.

The intersection of 7th Street NW and H Street NW is the heart of D.C.'s Chinatown neighborhood today, but prior to the 1930s it was populated primarily by German immigrants. Before the American Civil War, 7th Street NW was the city's primary commercial district, the street lined with three-story Federal-style townhouses with shops on the ground floor and residences above. Lincoln conspirator Mary Surratt's boarding house (604 H Street NW) has been substantially renovated through the years (and currently houses a Chinese restaurant), but it is also said to house Mary Surratt's ghost. From the 1870s onward, occupants of the building have claimed that Surratt's spirit is responsible for the incomprehensible mumbling and whispers, footsteps, muffled sobs, and creaking floorboards which have unnerved them.

=== National Theatre and National Building Museum ===
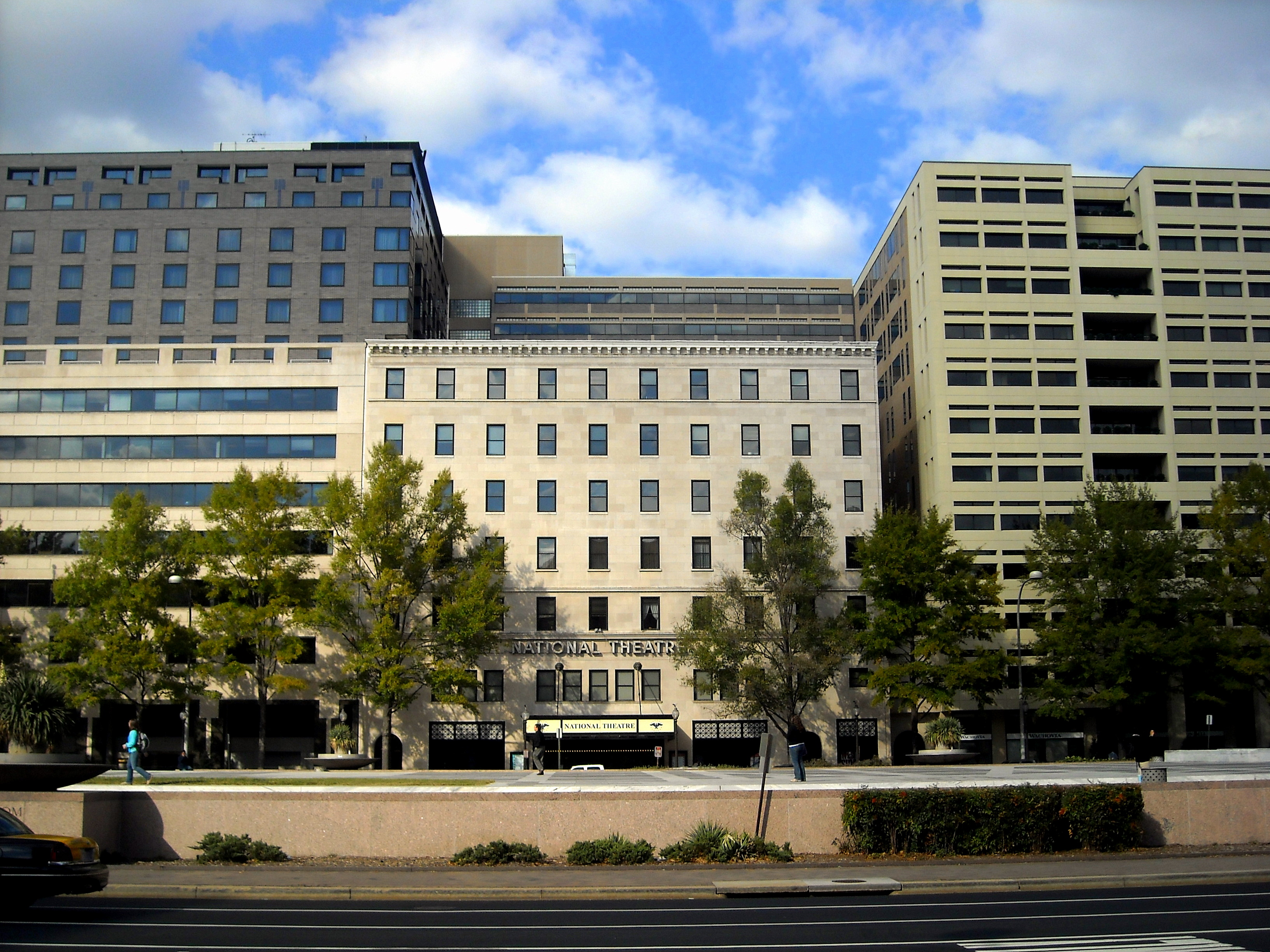
National Theatre

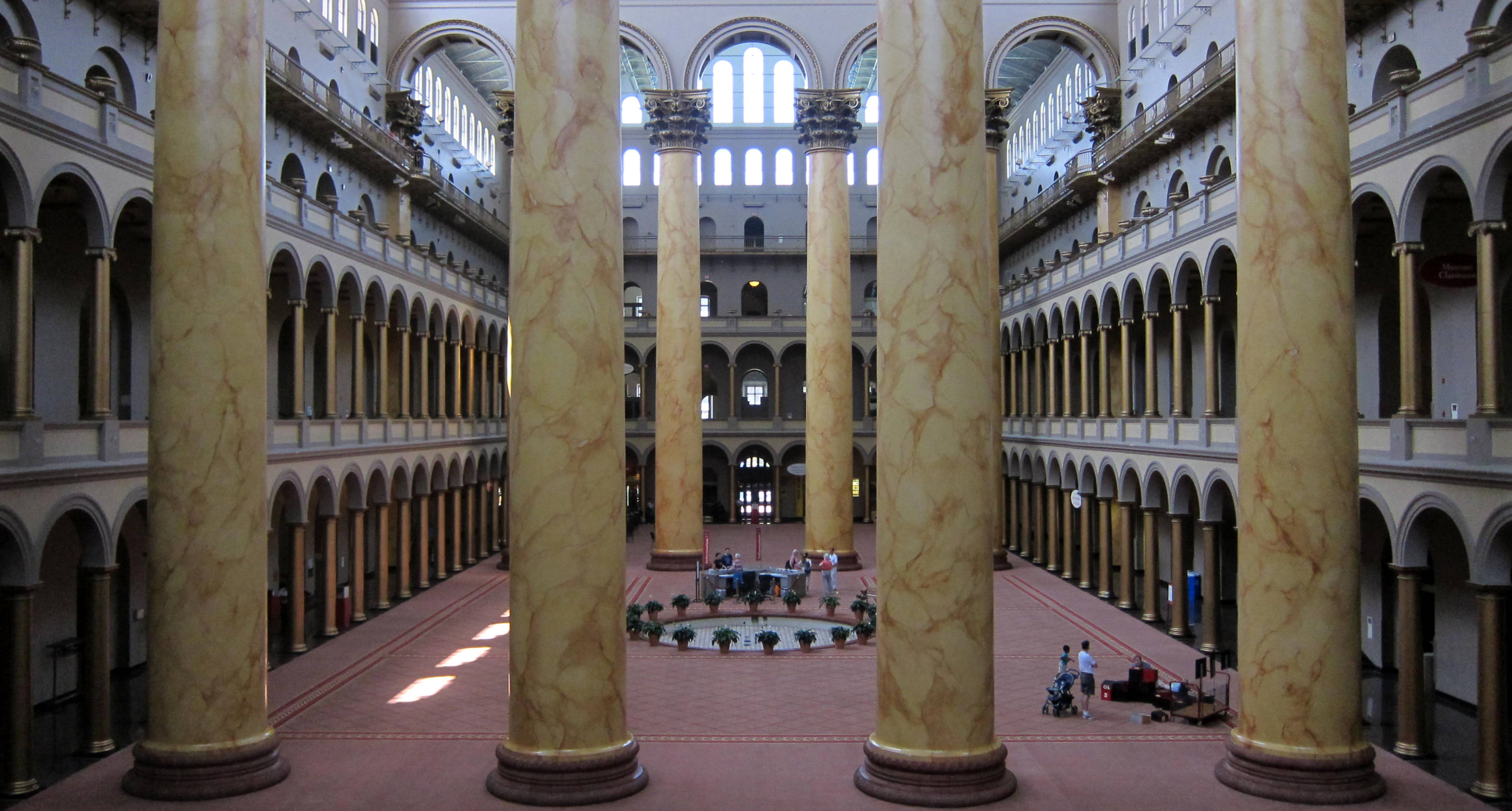
Interior of the National Building Museum, showing the building's Corinthian columns

At least three other sites in downtown D.C. are also reputed to be haunted. The National Theatre (1321 Pennsylvania Avenue NW) opened at its current location on December 7, 1835, although the old building was torn down and replaced with the current structure in 1923. Nonetheless, some claim the theater is haunted by the ghost of actor John McCullough, who was murdered in the 1880s by a fellow thespian where the modern stage is located today. The spook was first sighted by Frederic Bond, a comic actor and friend of McCullough's, in September 1896. Bond was on the stage late at night reviewing preparations for the next day's performance when he felt a spectral presence that terrified him. He then saw a ghostly figure dressed in the traditional garb of the Shakespearean character Hamlet. Recognizing the spirit, he shouted McCullough's name and the ghost vanished.

The National Building Museum (401 F Street NW), too, is allegedly haunted. Built in 1887 in order to process pensions for Civil War veterans, widows, and orphans (such pensions consumed a quarter of the federal budget at the time), the "Pension Building" (as it was originally known) contains 15 Corinthian columns made of brick and plaster and painted to imitate black onyx. Security guards and other witnesses have claimed that the swirling colors of the columns can change to form the outlines of people who have recently died, or who had ties to the building. When in use as the headquarters of the Superior Court of the District of Columbia in the 1940s, night watchmen reported seeing a man on horseback on the upper floors, where horses used to be quartered during the Civil War. They also reported seeing the ghost of James Tanner, a stenographer who took down the testimony of eyewitnesses after the assassination of President Lincoln at Ford's Theater (ironically, Robert Todd Lincoln approved the plans for the Pension Building). These stories gained such prominence that mystery writer Margaret Truman mentioned them in one of her novels.

=== Hay-Adams Hotel ===
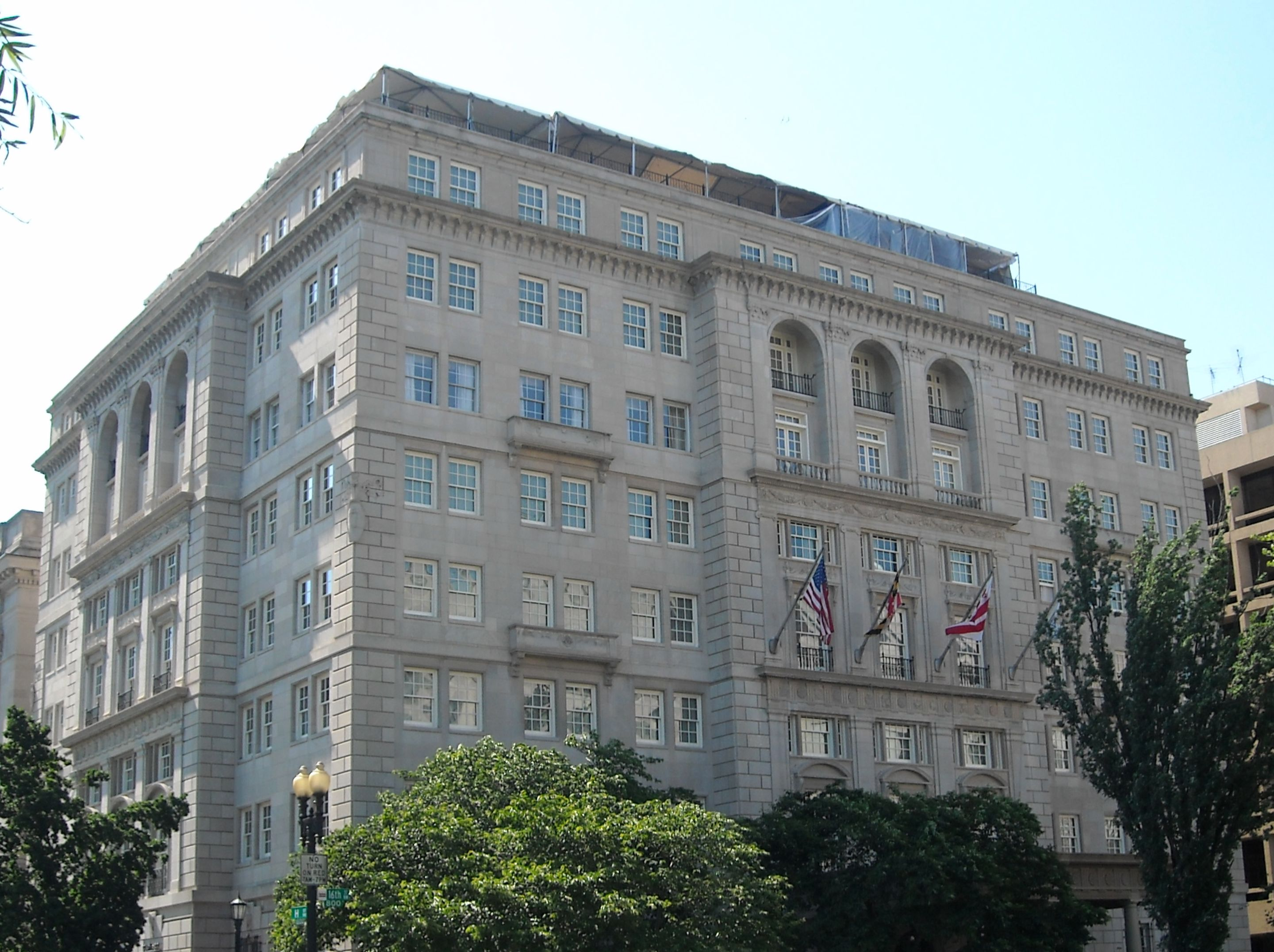
Hay-Adams Hotel

The Hay–Adams Hotel may also be host to the ghost of Marian "Clover" Hooper Adams. She was the wife of Henry Brooks Adams, the celebrated 19th-century American journalist, historian, academic and novelist who was the grandson of John Quincy Adams. She married Henry Adams on June 27, 1872, and in 1877 the couple moved to Washington, D.C., and rented the Slidell House at 1607 H Street NW. Their home became a salon for the capital's literati and politically powerful. In 1881, the Adamses purchased a lot on the northwest corner of 16th Street NW and H Street NW on Lafayette Square, and with their friend John Hay began building the famous Hay-Adams Houses—two of the most architecturally important private residences ever built in the city. Marian Adams' beloved father, to whom she was exceptionally close, died on April 13, 1885, and she sank into a deep depression. Just months before she was to occupy her spacious and luxurious new home, Adams committed suicide on December 6, 1885, by swallowing potassium cyanide. To mark her grave in Rock Creek Cemetery, Henry Adams commissioned sculptor Augustus Saint-Gaudens and architect Stanford White to create the haunting Adams Memorial with its hooded, robed, androgynous figure formally titled Mystery of the Hereafter and The Peace of God that Passeth Understanding (but which is commonly called Grief). The Hay-Adams Houses were razed in 1927 by real estate developer Harry Wardman, and the Hay-Adams Hotel built on the site. Although Marian Adams never lived in the house where the Hay-Adams Hotel is today, some hotel staff say her specter haunts the site. Housekeepers and other staff have reported being hugged by an invisible presence as well as hearing a woman sobbing. Other mysterious occurrences attributed to the Adams specter include locked doors opening and closing, clock radios turning on and off, and a woman's voice whispering, "What do you want?" A few witnesses say the ghost is accompanied by the scent of mimosa, Adams' favorite scent. The incidents are located primarily on the hotel's fourth floor, and occur usually during the first two weeks of December (near the anniversary of Marian Adams' death).

== Dupont Circle ==
=== Walsh Mansion (Indonesian Embassy) ===
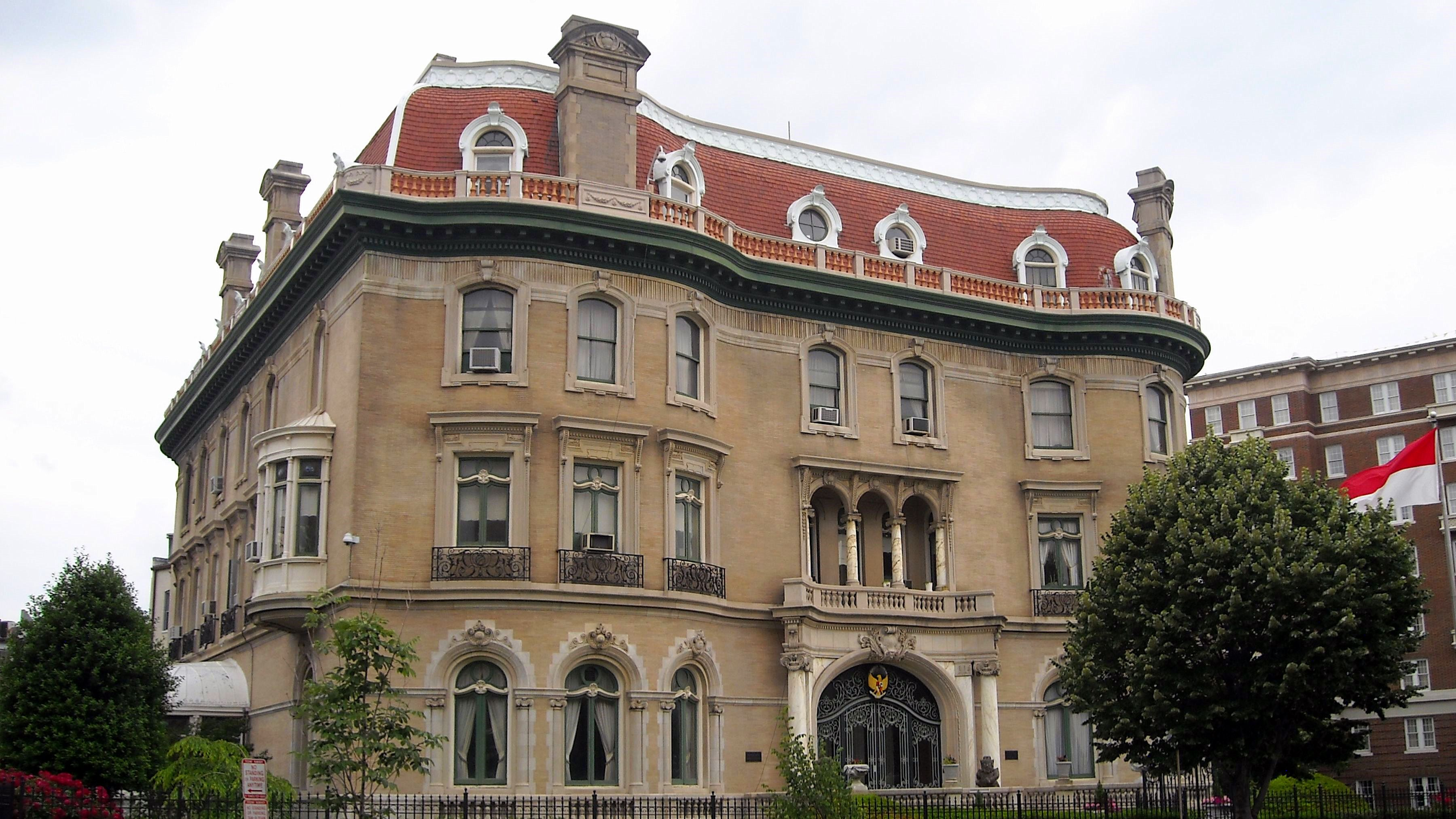
The former Walsh Mansion (now the Indonesian Embassy) near Dupont Circle

One of the most important buildings in the Dupont Circle neighborhood is the Walsh Mansion (now the Embassy of Indonesia) located at 2020 Massachusetts Avenue NW. Thomas J. Walsh had emigrated penniless from Ireland to the United States in 1869, then over the next quarter century built up a small fortune as a carpenter, miner, and hotel manager. His first daughter (born in 1880) died in infancy, but his second daughter, Evalyn (born in 1886), and son, Vinson (born in 1888), both survived. He lost nearly all his life's savings in the Panic of 1893. The family moved to Ouray, Colorado, in 1896, where Walsh bought the Camp Bird Mine (which was thought to have been worked out) and struck a massive vein of gold and silver. Now a multi-millionaire, Thomas Walsh moved his family to Washington, D.C., in 1898. After spending 1899–1900 in Paris, France, the Walshes returned to Washington where Thomas Walsh commenced the construction of a mansion on Massachusetts Avenue NW. The Walsh Mansion, completed in 1903, cost $835,000 (the most expensive residence in the city at the time) and had 60 rooms, a theater, a ballroom, a French salon, a grand staircase, and $2 million in furnishings which took several years to purchase and install. Evalyn Walsh married Edward Beale "Ned" McLean (the publishing heir whose family owned The Washington Post) in 1908, and after her father's death in April 1910 lived in the Walsh Mansion. In 1910, Ned McLean bought the allegedly cursed Hope Diamond for his wife for $180,000 (although the purchase was not formalized until February 1911, and not completed until after a lawsuit settled out of court in 1912). Evalyn Walsh died on April 26, 1947. To cover Evalyn's significant debts, the Walsh Mansion was sold in 1952 to the Government of Indonesia for use as an embassy. But according to embassy staff, Evalyn Walsh McLean never vacated the home. Rather, her spirit has been seen several times gliding down the mansion's grand central staircase. A naked lady's spectral form has also been seen from time to time in the mansion, but no one knows who she is.

=== Woodrow Wilson House ===
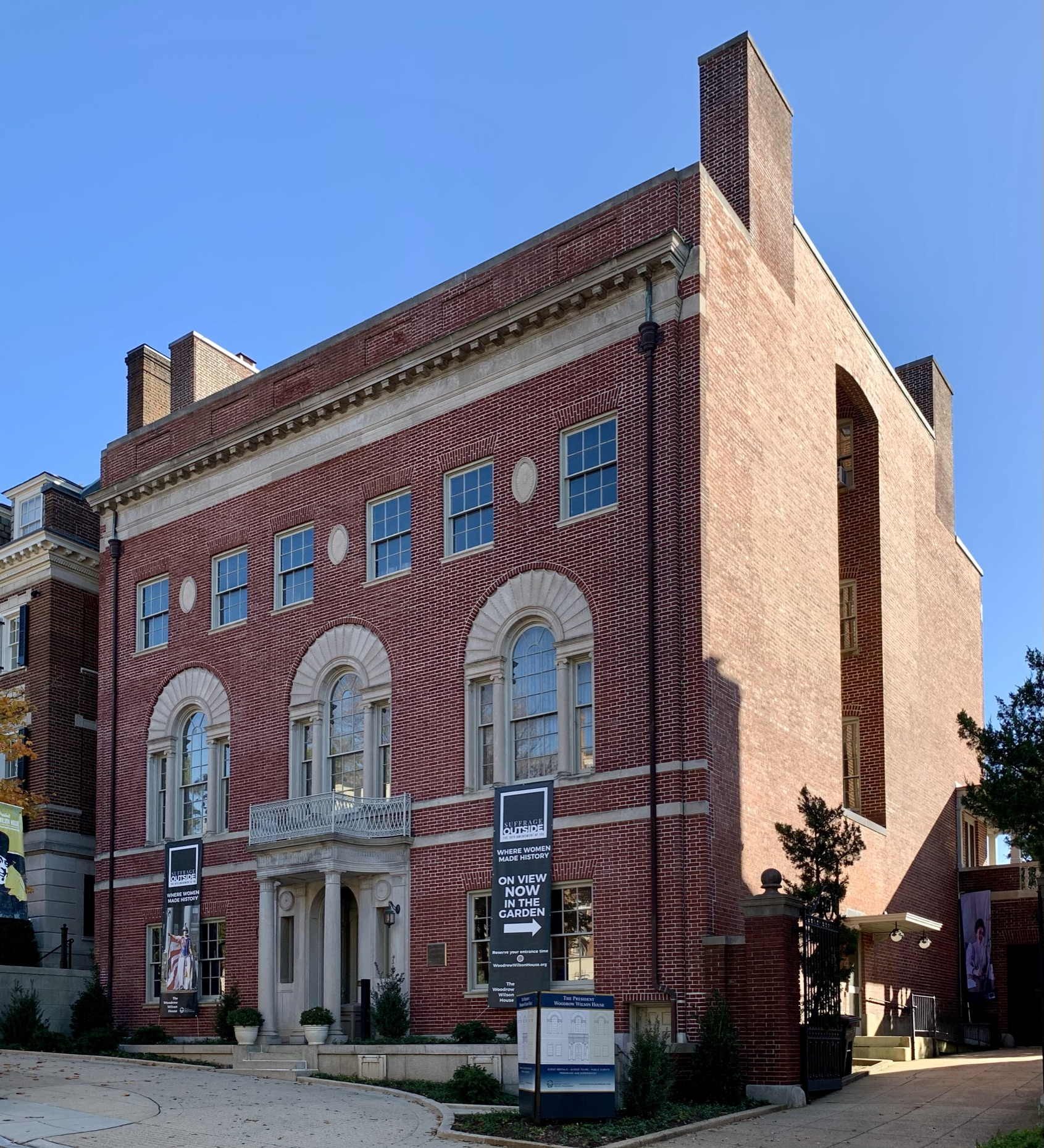
Woodrow Wilson House

A second noted house in the Dupont Circle neighborhood which is claimed to be haunted is the Woodrow Wilson House (2340 S Street NW). Woodrow Wilson was elected President of the United States in 1912, was re-elected in 1916 promising to keep the nation out of war, led the nation through World War I, and left office in 1921. At 2 AM on September 26, 1919, while traveling to Wichita, Kansas, on a nationwide speaking tour to win public support to pressure the Senate into ratifying the Treaty of Versailles, Wilson collapsed and, after cancelling the rest of his speaking tour, was rushed back to the capital by train. His condition worsened on the journey, and upon arriving at the White House on October 2 the President suffered a life-threatening stroke that left him permanently paralyzed on his left side and blind in the left eye. Although the President lived, he was confined to bed for two months, seen only by his wife, a few close associates, and his physicians. From December 1919 to April 1920 Wilson required a wheelchair. Wilson attended his first Cabinet meeting in April 1920, but for the rest of the year his mind continued to wander, his memory was marred, and he tired easily. By March 1921 (when he left office) Wilson was able to walk short distances with the use of a cane (and with a valet close at hand). The extent of Wilson's disability was kept from the public until after his death on February 3, 1924. President and Mrs. Wilson purchased a large home at 2340 S Street NW, to which a number of modifications were made (including the addition of an elevator). Woodrow Wilson received few guests in his last years, and died in his third floor bedroom on February 3, 1924. His wife, Edith Bolling Galt Wilson, lived in the home until her death on December 28, 1961, and willed the home to the National Trust for Historic Preservation to be made into a museum honoring her husband. In the decades since her death, staff and visitors at the Woodrow Wilson House claim to have seen the President's ghost sitting in his rocking chair, heard the shuffle of a man walking with a cane, and heard a man sob.

== Georgetown ==
General Edward Braddock left Observatory Hill in Georgetown in 1755 on an expedition to capture the French Fort Duquesne during the French and Indian War. Braddock's expedition was surprised on July 9 in the vicinity of present-day Braddock, Pennsylvania, in what is now known as the Battle of the Monongahela. Nearly 900 of Braddock's 1,300 men were killed or wounded, and Braddock himself killed. Since before the American Civil War, witnesses say that on the anniversary of Braddock's departure they can hear shouted military orders, horses' hooves on cobblestones, the sound of men marching, and the sound of metal clanking against metal. The sounds can be heard near the old Long Bridge or near the Georgetown bluffs overlooking the Potomac River.

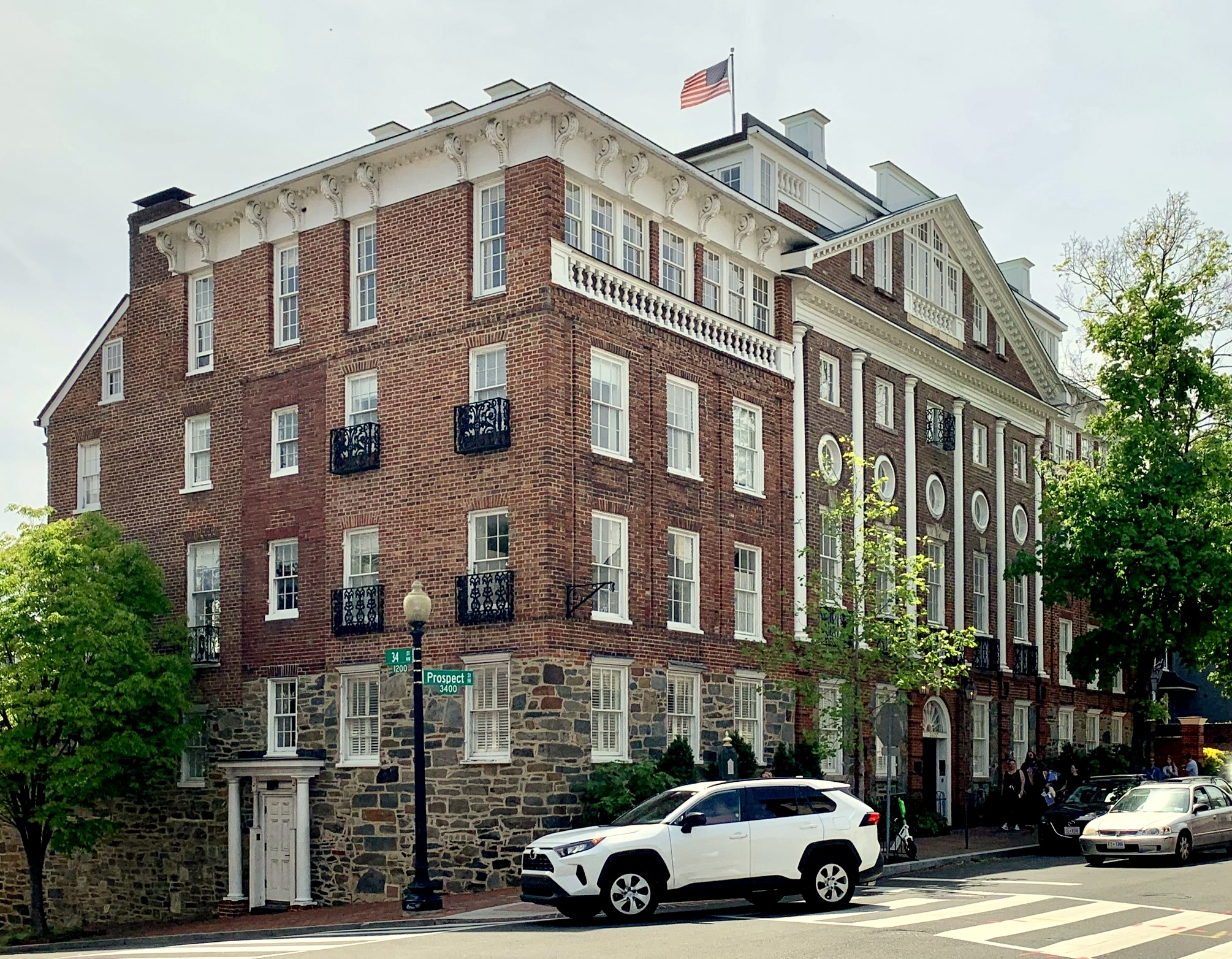
Halcyon House

Halcyon House (3400 Prospect Street NW) is a 30,000-square-foot (2,800 m^{2}) mansion originally built in 1787 by Benjamin Stoddert, the first Secretary of the Navy. Halcyon House was owned by several individuals in the 19th century, and is alleged to have served as part of the Underground Railroad. The home was sold in 1900 to Albert Clemens, a nephew of Mark Twain. The original structure was heavily altered over the next 38 years. Clemens believed that perpetually rebuilding the house would extend his life. The coach house was joined to the building, apartments added to the north face and rear, rooms built within rooms, hallways added and then walled off, and even a small crypt added in one room. Clemens died in 1938. Halcyon House is allegedly haunted by the spirits of numerous runaway slaves who died there during their escape to freedom, and whose moans and cries can be heard in the basement. Others claim that the ghost of Benjamin Stoddert has been seen, heard walking through the house, sitting in a chair, or whispering unintelligibly. The spirit of a woman has also been spotted in an upstairs window. A six-year-old visitor claimed that the woman frequently woke him at night by rearranging his covers. Two residents say they have experienced levitation during the night, with their bodies being reversed so that their feet were on the pillow. Unnamed residents have told about lights mysteriously going out and sounds in the attic.

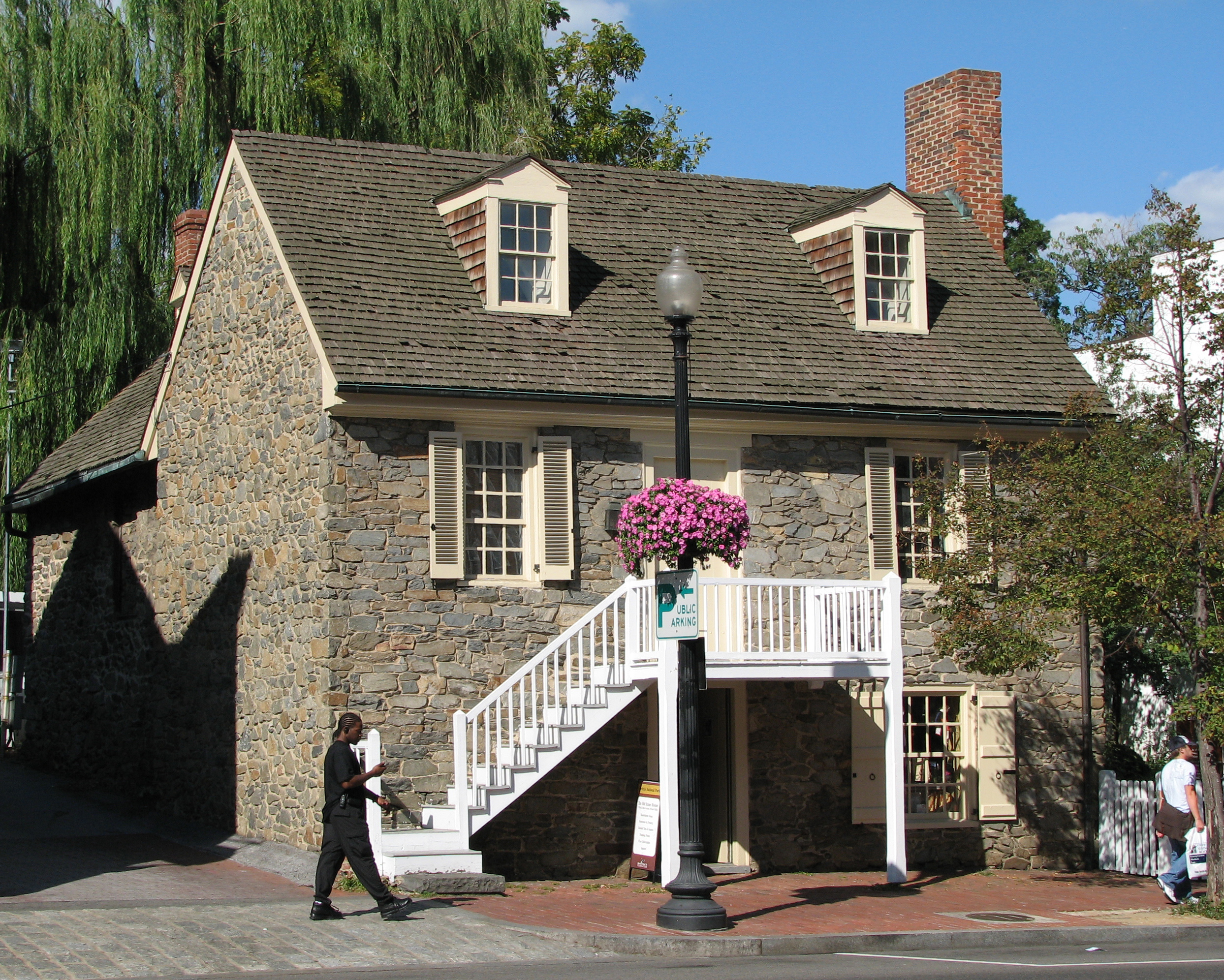
The Old Stone House in Georgetown, which allegedly houses a malevolent ghost.

The Old Stone House (3051 M Street NW) was built in 1765 by Christopher and Rachel Layman. The house was sold in 1767 to a wealthy widow, Cassandra Chew, who constructed a kitchen in the rear in 1767, and a second floor between 1767 and 1775, and a third floor in the 1790s. It remained in private hands for almost two centuries, used as a home and place of business, until the federal government purchased it in 1953 . An exceptionally large number of spirits, residents and visitors claim, inhabit the small house. These include: A woman in a brown dress standing near the fireplace, a heavy-set woman standing on the staircase and also in the kitchen, a man with long blond hair and wearing a blue jacket, a man wearing short pants and long stockings, a woman in a rocking chair on the third floor, a small boy who runs down the third floor hallway, a man dressed in Colonial-era clothing standing in the master bedroom, a man dressed in Colonial-era clothing seen on the second floor, a young girl with curly hair running up and down the staircase, an African American boy, and a German-looking craftsman. The laughter of invisible children and the translucent images of women cooking in the kitchen have also been observed. The Old Stone House may also contain one of Washington's only malevolent spirits, nicknamed "George", who has choked and pushed visitors and whose presence (often indicated by an extremely cold spot) leaves witnesses with an intense feeling of dread. The hauntings at the Old Stone House are so well known that they were mentioned in Sandi Wilson's short crime story, "The Blonde in Black".

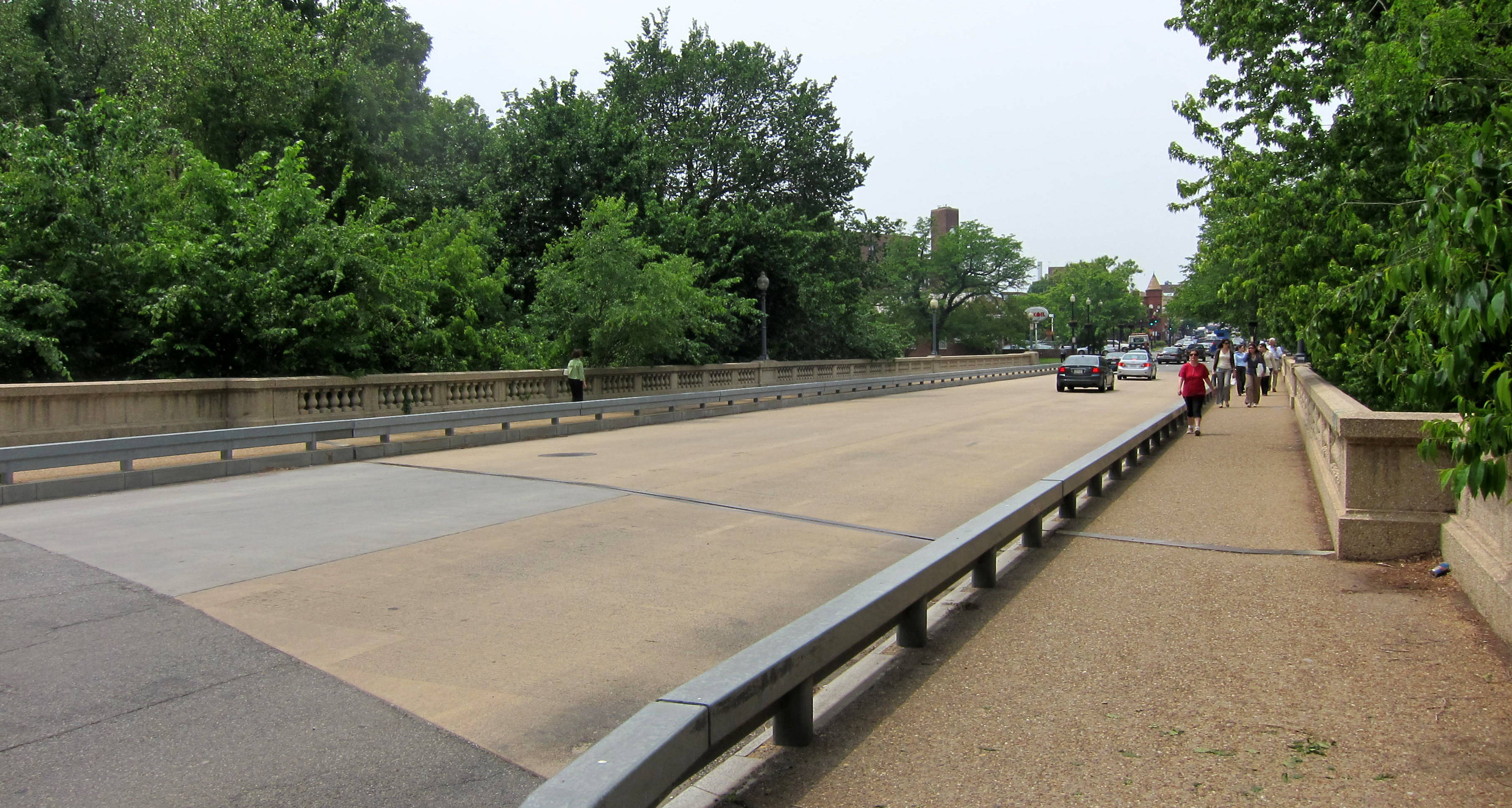
M Street Bridge

Bridges in Georgetown may also be the sites of ghostly activity. Two specters are said to haunt the site of the M Street Bridge. M Street NW was known on the Georgetown side as "Bridge Street" before the street renaming of 1895. In 1788, a wooden drawbridge was built over Rock Creek to connect Bridge Street with M Street NW in Washington. But the bridge collapsed during a rain storm shortly after it was built, taking a stagecoach full of passengers with it. Federal Bridge, a sturdier structure, was built over Rock Creek in 1802. However, from the early 19th century to the early 20th century, Georgetown residents claimed to see a silent stagecoach race down Bridge Street on starless nights, and then disappear in the center of the new span. Another apparition said to haunt the bridge was that of a drummer boy who allegedly had been knocked off the bridge (during the American Revolutionary War or in the early 19th century after the bridge had been rebuilt) by a gust of wind and drowned in Rock Creek. On quiet nights, witnesses claimed to hear soft drumming which got louder near the center of the span but disappeared once the spot where the boy drowned was reached. The image of a headless man (whose origins are shrouded in mystery) is said to sometimes haunt the Georgetown side of the K Street NW bridge over Rock Creek as well.

== Uptown ==
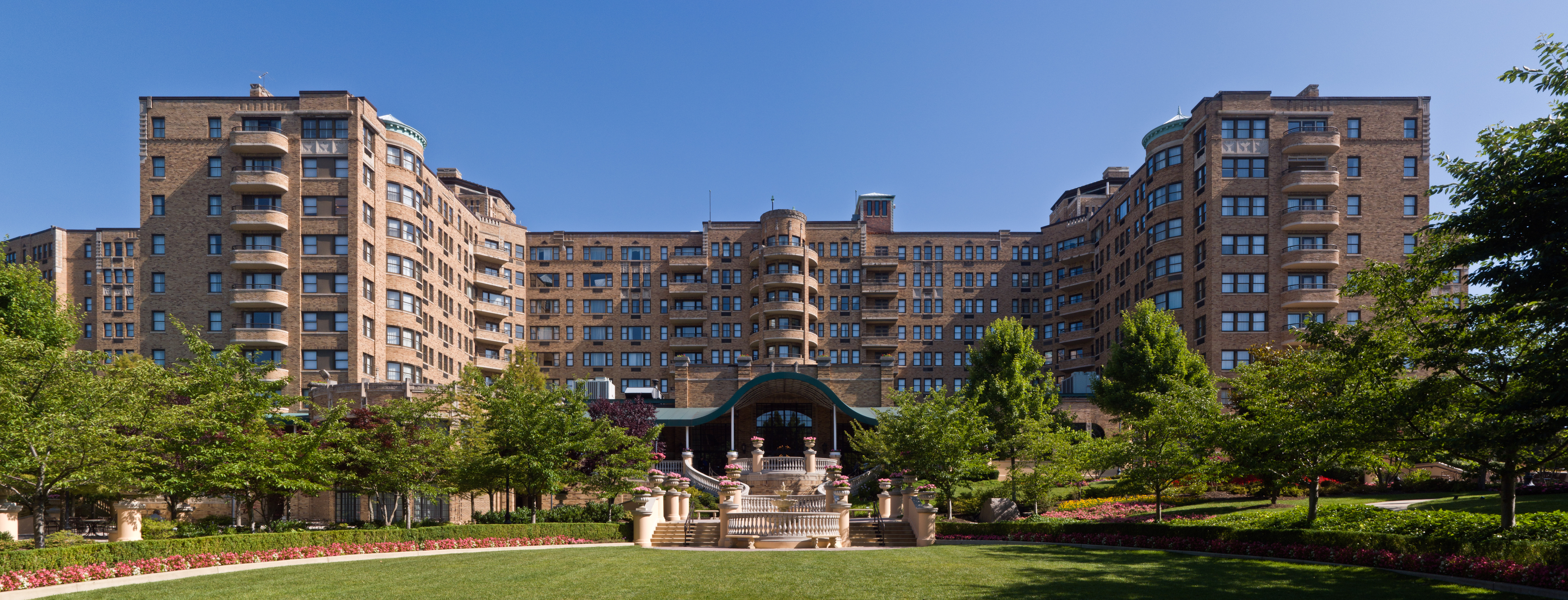
Omni Shoreham Hotel

Another spirit reportedly haunts the Omni Shoreham Hotel (2500 Calvert Street NW), built in 1930 by local construction company owner Harry Bralove and designed by Waddy Butler Wood. The hotel's owners accepted Henry L. Doherty as a minority financial partner. Doherty and his family moved into an apartment (now Suite 870) in the hotel, along with their maid, Juliette Brown. A few months after the Dohertys moved into the apartment, their maid died in the night. A short time later, the Doherty's daughter, Helen, also died in the suite. The Dohertys moved out, and the apartment remained unoccupied for almost 50 years. The apartment was renovated into a hotel suite. But guests and hotel staff began to tell stories of faint voices, cold breezes, doors slamming shut and opening of their own accord, and televisions and lights turning on and off on their own. Guests in adjoining suites would complain of noises coming from the closed and empty Suite 870. Other occupants say furniture would be found out of place, and hotel staff said their housekeeping carts would move on their own. The Omni Shoreham Hotel has named the room the "Ghost Suite". Todd Scartozzi, an Omni Hotels manager, stayed in the Ghost Suite with his family and observed a walk-in closet light turning on and off of its own accord.

== See also ==
- Ghosts of the American Civil War
- Haunted house
- Lincoln's Ghost
- List of reportedly haunted locations
  - United States
- List of ghosts
