= Ghost of Abraham Lincoln (photograph) =

1872 hoax photograph

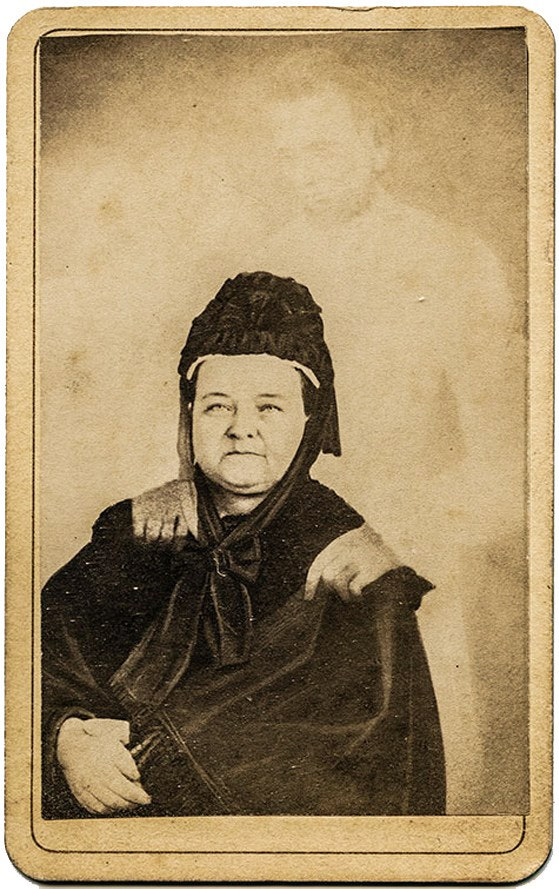
Ghost of Abraham Lincoln, appearing to show Abraham Lincoln as a white figure standing over Mary Todd Lincoln

The Ghost of Abraham Lincoln is a photograph taken by the American photographer William Mumler in 1872. It appears to depict a faint white figure, interpreted as the ghost of U.S. president Abraham Lincoln, standing over his seated widow, Mary Todd Lincoln. The photograph is assumed to be a hoax, although it is still unclear how exactly it was created.

The photograph is currently the property of the Ian Rolland Center for Lincoln Research. It is part of the Friends of the Lincoln at Allen County Public Library, Fort Wayne, Indiana.

== Background ==
Mumler began taking spirit photographs in 1862. He invited the renowned photographer J. W. Black to examine the process he used, but Black was unable to tell how "ghosts" appeared in Mumler's photographs. Throughout the 1860s, Mumler's career took hold, and many spiritualists came to him for photographs. One of the reasons for a surge in demand was the American Civil War, which caused more than 600,000 deaths. He was repeatedly accused of fraud and was brought to trial in May 1869. The prosecution brought a list of possible methods Mumler could have used to fake the photographs, but none of them could be proven without a reasonable doubt. He was acquitted of the charges, and his career in photography continued.

In February 1872, Mary Lincoln was still mourning the loss of her husband, Abraham Lincoln, after his assassination nearly seven years earlier. In her later years, Lincoln was institutionalized after a trial in 1875, though was later released into the custody of her sister Elizabeth.

== Legacy ==
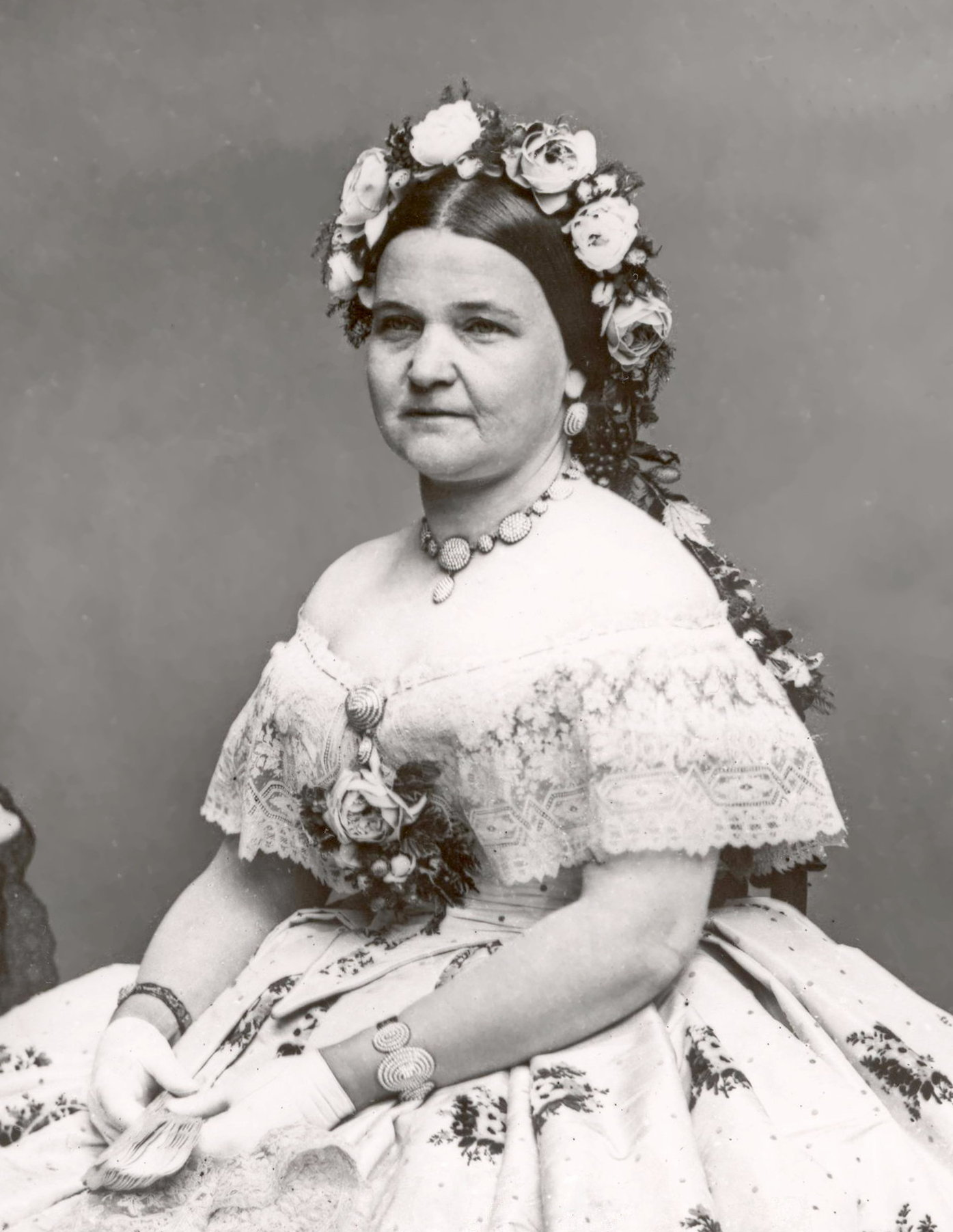
Mary Lincoln in 1861

The photograph is one of the most famous hoaxes of the 19th century. While the method Mumler used may have been double exposure, it has not been proven. The process is made more complicated by the fact that Abraham's arms appear to be on Mary's shoulders. In 2022, photographic process historian Mark Osterman demonstrated a possible technique using two negatives, printed simultaneously with sleight of hand.

== See also ==
- Lincoln's ghost
