= USCHS =

USCHS may refer to:

- United States Capitol Historical Society
- Upper St. Clair High School, in southern Pittsburgh, Pennsylvania
