= Demon Cat =

Ghost cat in American folklore

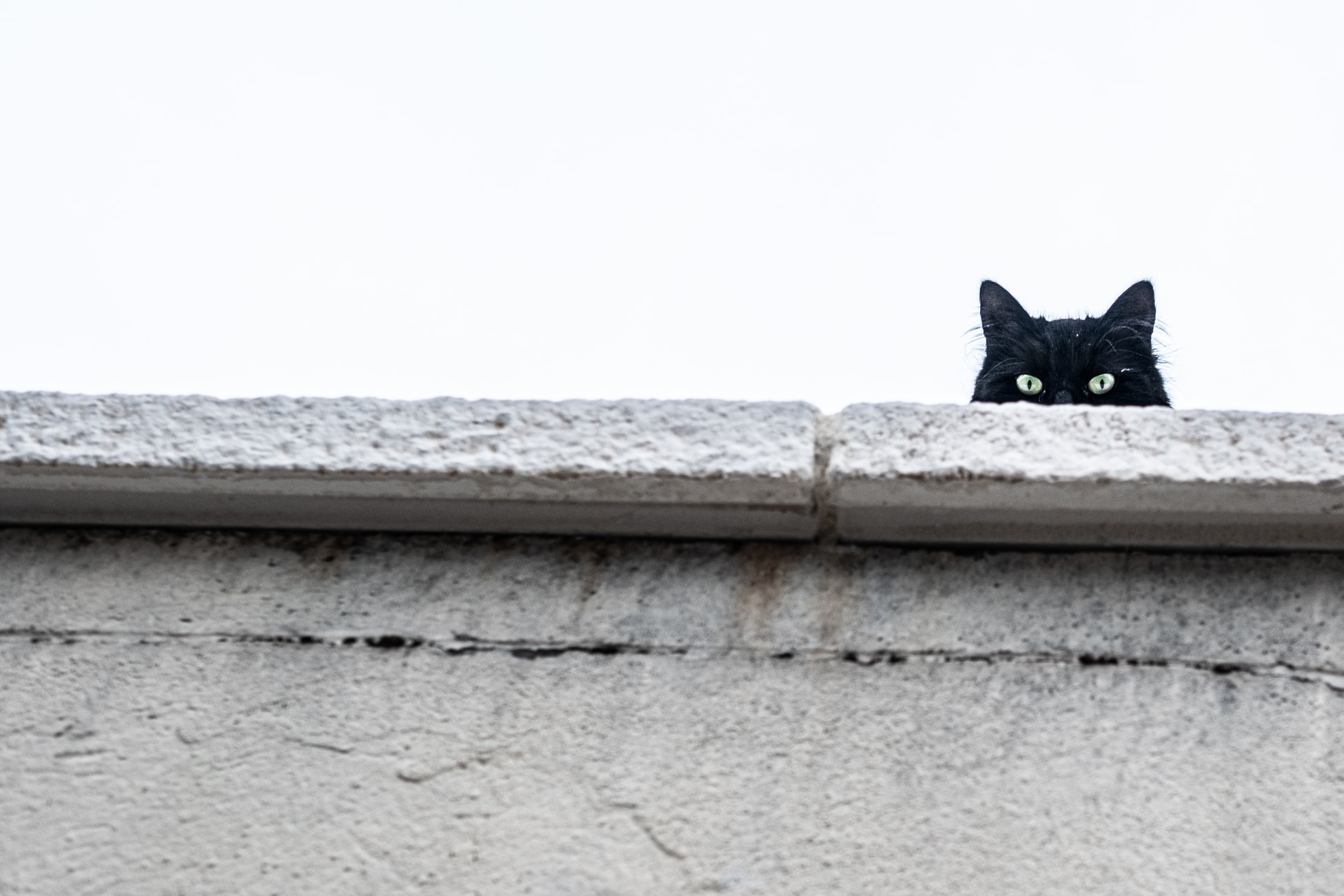
Black cat peering over a wall in Washington D.C.

The Demon Cat (also referred to as the D.C.) is a ghost cat in American folklore that is purported to haunt the government buildings of Washington, D.C., which is the capital city of the United States. It is alleged to haunt the White House and the United States Capitol.

== History ==
The story of the Demon Cat dates back to the mid‑1800s when cats were brought into the basement tunnels of the United States Capitol Building to catch rats and mice. Legend states that the Demon Cat is one of these cats that never left, even after its death. Its home is supposedly the basement crypt of the Capitol Building, which was originally intended as a burial chamber for George Washington.

According to legend, the cat is seen before presidential elections and tragedies in Washington, D.C., allegedly being spotted by White House security guards on the night before the assassinations of John F. Kennedy and Abraham Lincoln. It is described as either a black cat or a tabby cat, and the size of an average house cat. However, witnesses report that the cat swells to "the size of a giant tiger" or an elephant, said to be 10 feet tall and 10 feet long, when alerted. The cat would then either explode or pounce at the witness, disappearing before it managed to catch its 'victim'.

In the 1890s, the cat is said to have inexplicably vanished when some Capitol Hill guards fired their guns at it, and another guard is said to have died of a heart attack after seeing it. The Demon Cat was also allegedly seen in the final days or aftermath of World War II in the 1940s.

== Explanation ==
According to Steve Livengood, the chief tour guide of the U.S. Capitol Historical Society, the Capitol Police force was notorious for hiring unqualified relatives and friends of Congressmen as favors; these men would frequently be drunk whilst on patrol. Livengood believes the legend began when a security guard who was lying down in a drunken stupor was licked by one of the Capitol building's cats and mistakenly assumed it to be a giant cat. Livengood states that upon reporting the incident to his superior, the guard would have been sent home to recover, and "eventually the other guards found out that they could get a day off if they saw the demon cat".

== See also ==
- Reportedly haunted locations in Washington, D.C.
