= James Curley (astronomer) =

Irish-American astronomer and Jesuit (1796–1889)

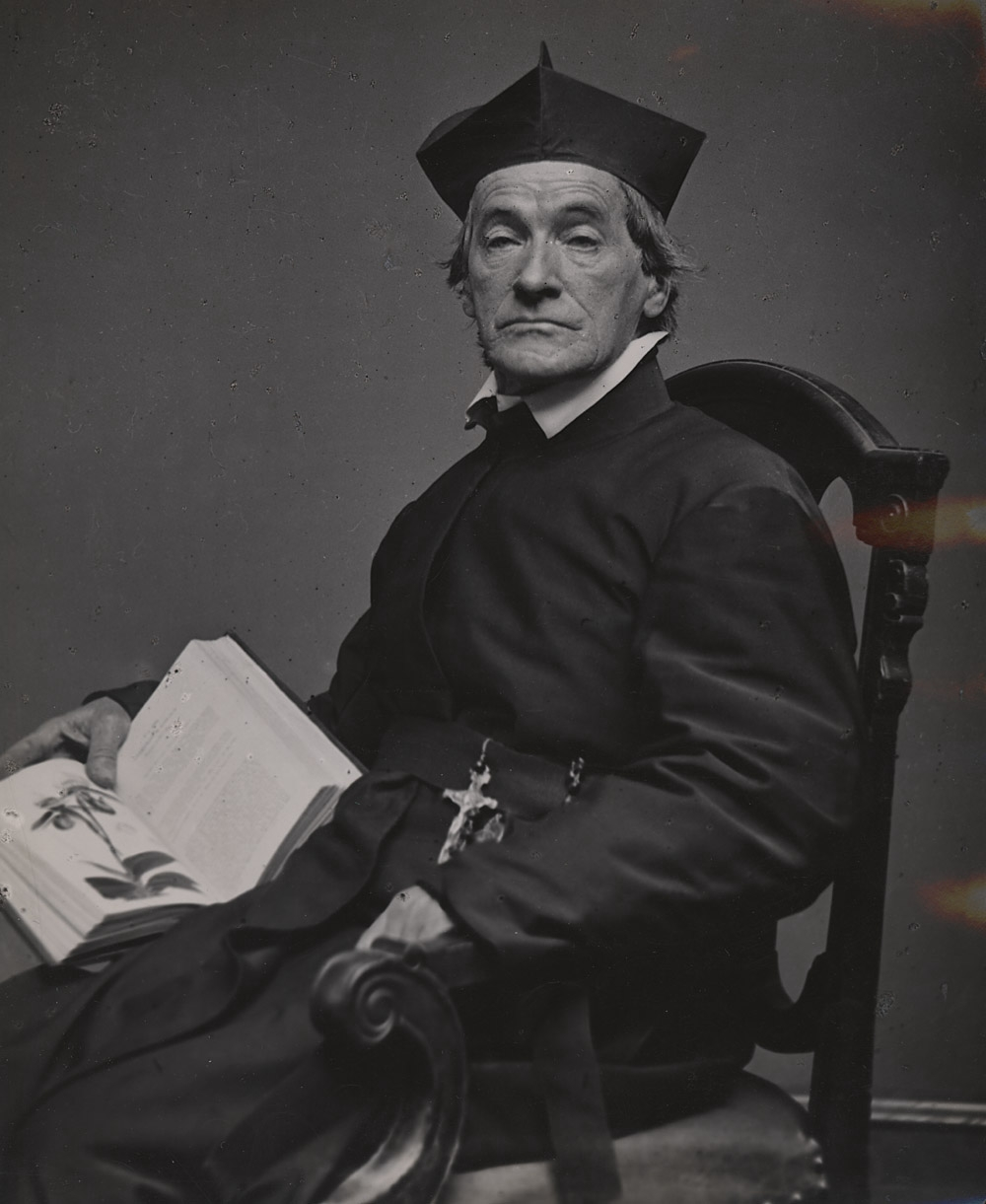
James Curley

James Curley (26 October 1796 – 24 July 1889) was an Irish-American astronomer and Jesuit.

== Early life and education ==
Curley was born on 26 October 1796 at Athleague, County Roscommon, Ireland. His early education was limited, though his talent for mathematics was discovered, and to some extent developed, by a teacher in his native town. He left Ireland in his youth, arriving in Philadelphia on 10 October 1817. Here he worked for two years as a bookkeeper and then taught mathematics at Frederick, Maryland.

In 1826 he became a student at the old seminary in Washington, DC, intending to prepare himself for the Catholic priesthood, and at the same time taught one of its classes. The seminary, however, which had been established in 1820, was closed in the following year and he joined the Society of Jesus on 29 September 1827.

== Career ==
After completing his novitiate he again taught in Frederick and was sent in 1831 to teach natural philosophy at Georgetown University. He also studied theology and was ordained priest on 1 June 1833. His first Mass was said at the Georgetown Visitation Monastery, Georgetown, where he afterwards acted as chaplain for fifty years.

He spent the remainder of his life at Georgetown, where he taught natural philosophy and mathematics for forty-eight years. He planned and superintended the building of the Georgetown Observatory in 1844 and was its first director, filling this position for many years. One of his earliest achievements was the determination of the latitude and longitude of Washington, D.C. in 1846. His results did not agree with those obtained at the Naval Observatory, and it was not until after the laying of the first transatlantic cable in 1858 that his determination was found to be near the truth.

== Legacy ==
Curley was also much interested in botany. He is best remembered, however, as a teacher. He wrote Annals of the Observatory of Georgetown College, D.C., containing the description of the observatory and the description and use of the transit instrument and meridian circle (New York, 1852).

== See also ==
- List of Catholic clergy scientists
