= McNally (crater) =

Crater on the Moon

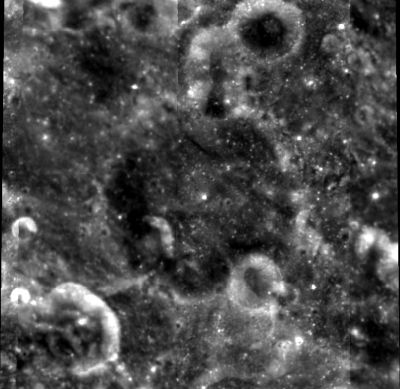
- Clementine mosaic
- Coordinates: 22.6°N 127.2°W
- Diameter: 47 km
- Depth: Unknown
- Colongitude: 128° at sunrise
- Eponym: Paul A. McNally

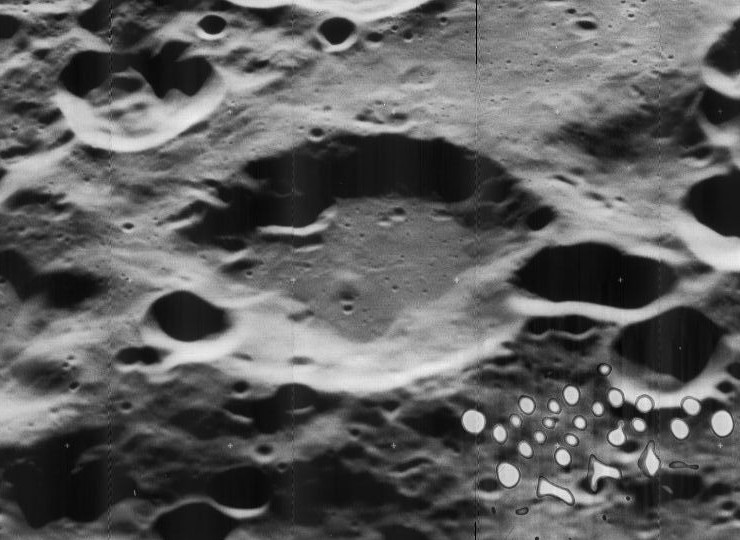
Oblique Lunar Orbiter 5 image. Spots in lower right are blemishes on original.

McNally is a crater that is located to the north-northwest of the much larger crater Fersman, on the far side of Moon.

This is a worn crater with a rounded rim edge that is marked by many tiny impacts. It includes a 7.11-km long lobate scarp. Smaller, cup-shaped impacts cut through the rim along the southeastern and northern edges. There is a small craterlet along the base of the southeastern inner wall. The interior floor is otherwise relatively featureless. The crater is named after the Jesuit astronomer and Catholic priest Paul A. McNally.

== Satellite craters ==
By convention these features are identified on lunar maps by placing the letter on the side of the crater midpoint that is closest to McNally.

McNally	Latitude	Longitude	Diameter
T	22.3° N	129.0° W	19 km
Y	24.2° N	127.5° W	22 km
