= Benedict Sestini =

The Rev. Benedict Sestini SJ
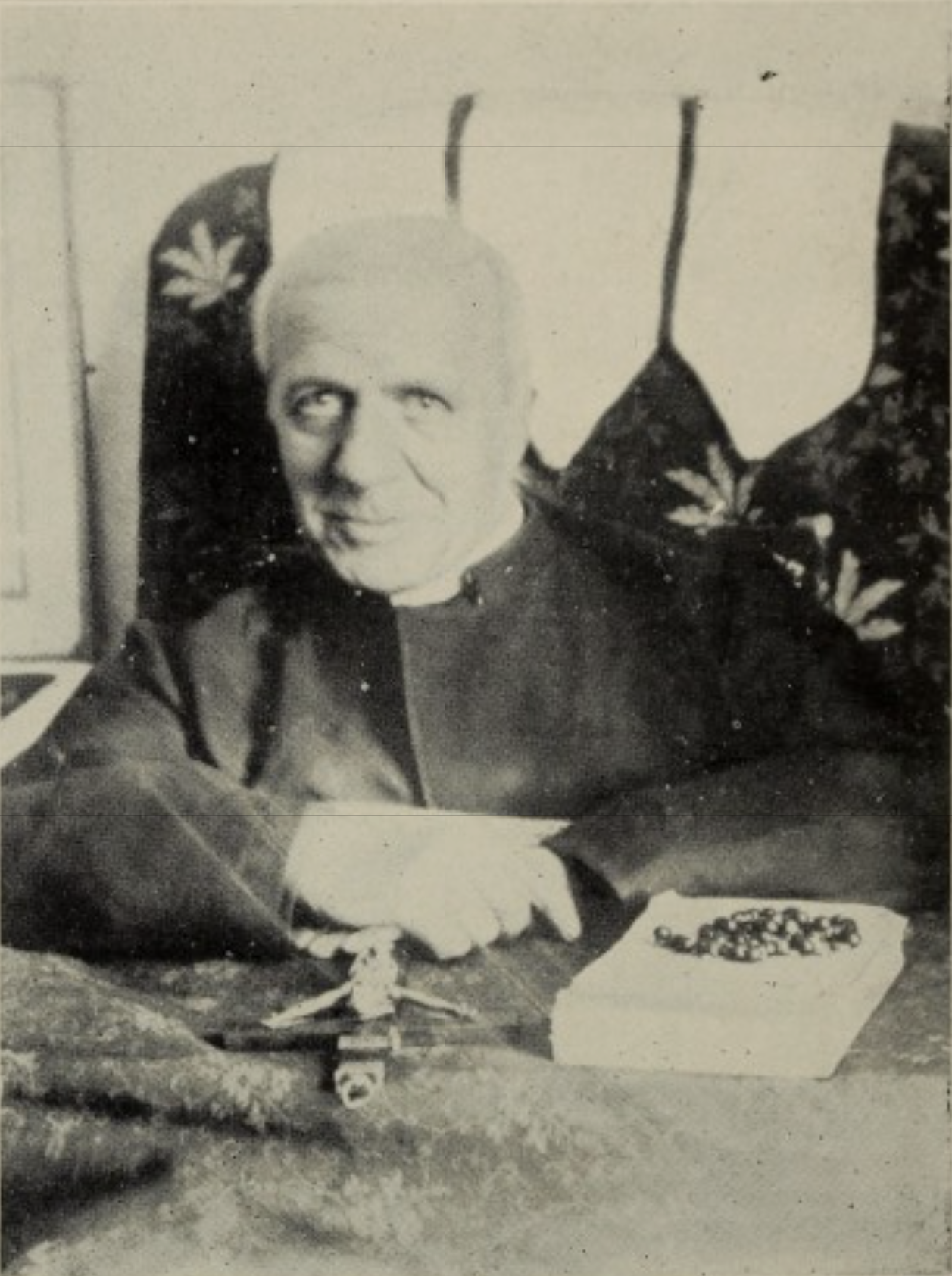
- Born: Benedetto Sestini; March 20, 1816; Florence, Italy
- Died: January 17, 1890 (aged 73); Frederick, Maryland, U.S.
- Citizenship: Italian, American
- Education: Roman College
- Occupations: astronomer, mathematician, architect, priest
- Employer: Georgetown College

Benedict Sestini, SJ (born Benedetto Sestini; March 20, 1816 – January 17, 1890) was a Jesuit astronomer, mathematician and architect, who worked in Italy and the U.S.

== Career ==
Sestini was born in Florence, Italy, on March 20, 1816. He entered the Society of Jesus in Rome on October 30, 1836, and studied at the Roman College (now Pontifical Gregorian University) where he followed the courses of Vincent Caraffa, the professor of mathematics. He was appointed assistant to Francesco de Vico, director of the Vatican Observatory. Sestini was ordained in 1844, and then held the chair of higher mathematics at the Roman College.

He published a work of astronomy called Catalogue of Star-Colors in his Memoirs of the Roman College, 1845 and 1847. The second memoir includes the first, and forms the entire catalogue, except the twelve celestial charts that accompanied the first.

The Revolution of 1848 caused him to flee Rome. The second memoir was in the printer's hands then and the revolution prevented completion of the work. The colour catalogue is the first general review of the heavens for star-colours, from the North Pole to 30 degrees south of the Equator.

Sestini went the United States and lived mainly at Georgetown College for twenty years.

From 1848 until his retirement 1884, Sestini was intensely engaged in teaching mathematics to the Jesuit scholastics. He published a series of textbooks on algebra, geometry and trigonometry, analytical geometry, and calculus. He wrote treatises on natural science for the use of his pupils; some of these were lithographed and others were privately printed at Woodstock: Theoretical Mechanics in 1873; Animal Physics in 1874; and Principles of Cosmography in 1878.

At Georgetown Observatory, in 1850, Sestini made a series of sunspot drawings, which were engraved and published (44 plates) as "Appendix A" of the Naval Observatory volume for 1847, printed in 1853. The work was republished in 1898.

Sestini was the architect of St. Aloysius Church, Washington, DC, which opened in 1859.

Around 1869 Sestini collaborated with John Rudolph Niernsee on the architectural plans for Building 1 of the new Jesuit scholasticate (college) in Woodstock, Maryland (Woodstock College). He moved to the college when it opened in 1869 and stayed there until 1884.

Sestini founded the American Messenger of the Sacred Heart in 1866, and retained editorial control of it until 1885; during these years he was also head director of the Apostleship of Prayer in the United States. He had many difficulties to contend with in launching and sustaining the "Messenger", and in directing the League of the Sacred Heart.

His last astronomical work was from his observations of the total eclipse of July 29, 1878, in Denver, Colorado. A sketch of the corona as it appeared to him was published in the Catholic Quarterly Review.

Because his health was declining, he was transferred in 1885 to the novitiate in Frederick, Maryland, where paralysis eventually ended his career. He died there on January 17, 1890.

== See also ==
- List of Roman Catholic scientist-clerics
