= Georgetown University Astronomical Observatory =

- U.S. National Register of Historic Places
- D.C. Inventory of Historic Sites
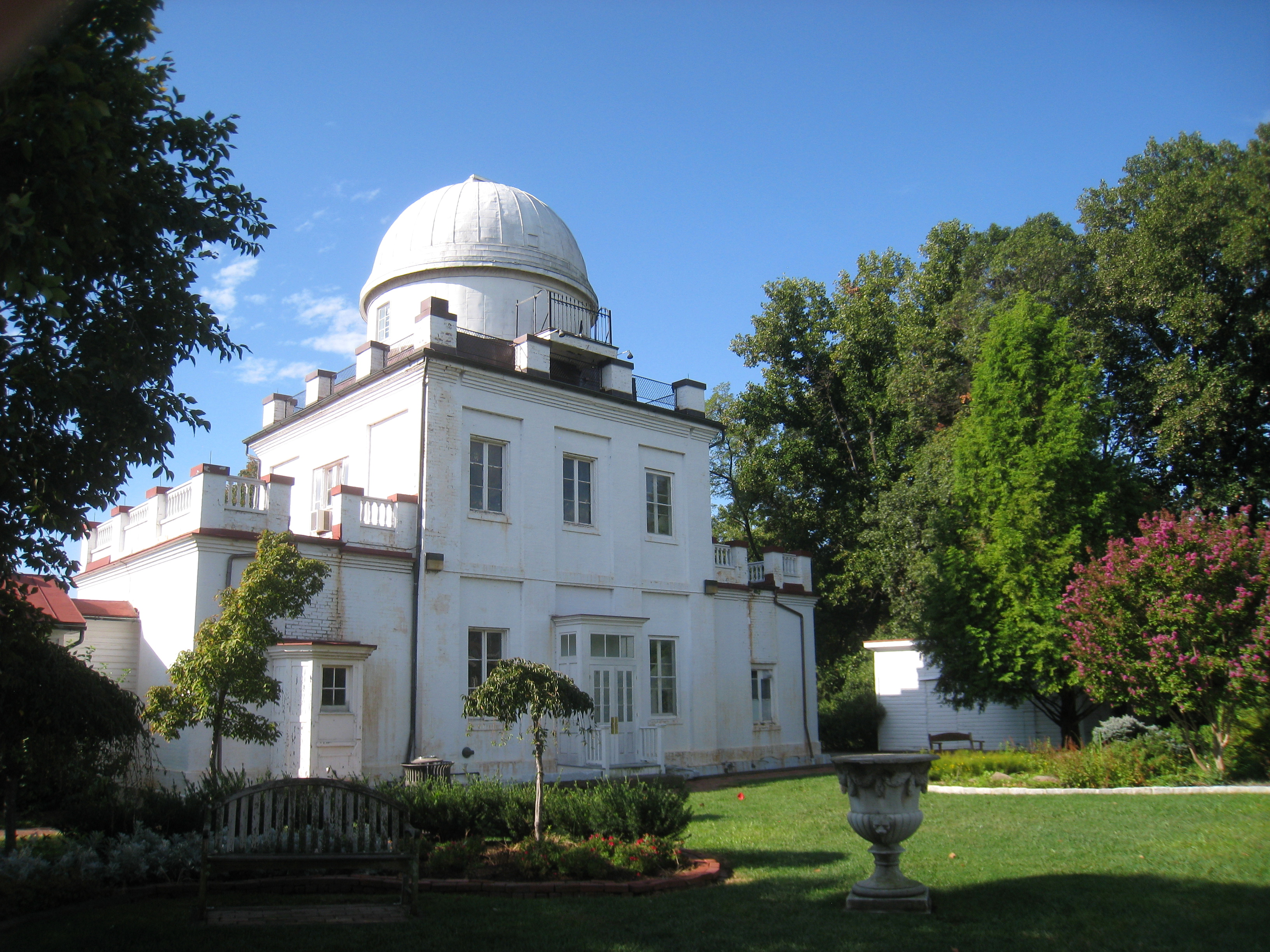
- Observatory in September 2010

- Location within Washington, D.C.
- Location: Georgetown, Washington, D.C.
- Coordinates: 38°54′30″N 77°04′38″W
- Built: 1841–1843
- Architect: James Curley
- Architectural style: Greek Revival
- NRHP reference No.: 73002087

Significant dates
- Added to NRHP: July 2, 1973
- Designated DCIHS: November 8, 1964

The Georgetown University Astronomical Observatory (also the Heyden Observatory and Francis J. Heyden Observatory) was founded in 1841 by Father James Curley of the Department of Physics at Georgetown College. Father Curley chose a site on the college grounds, planned the building, and supervised its construction to its completion in 1844. Costs were initially paid by Rev. Thomas Meredith Jenkins, S.J., and Rev. Charles H. Stonestreet, S.J., who were Georgetown professors at the time. The observatory was used in 1846 to determine the latitude and longitude of Washington, D.C., which Curley determined to be latitude 38°54′26N and longitude 5^{h}8^{m}18.29^{s} (west of Greenwich).

In 1850, Benedict Sestini used the Observatory to make a series of sunspot drawings, which were engraved and published (44 plates) as "Appendix A" of the Naval Observatory volume for 1847, printed in 1853. In 1888, Johann Georg Hagen was named director. He was responsible for the installation of the 12-inch equatorial telescope with which for twenty years he observed and gathered data on variable stars. This instrument is still in continuous use. In 1928, Paul McNally became director. Francis J. Heyden, S.J. became director in 1945, and continued research into solar eclipses. In 1972, Georgetown University closed its Department of Astronomy, and the Observatory was used by the Georgetown University Astronomical Society and the Department of Biology. Light pollution from surrounding Washington, D.C., has limited viewing celestial bodies from the location.

On July 2, 1973, the Observatory was designated as a U.S. national landmark National Register of Historic Places. The Georgetown University Astronomical Society has, with support of Department of Physics and Georgetown University, periodically sponsored renovation of the Observatory, which was primarily used by the Laboratory of Entomology and Biodiversity directed by Professor Edward M. Barrows in 1996-2023. The Heyden Memorial Garden is on the east and north sides of the observatory. The garden has a conservation garden with native species; formal gardens; ponds with fish, frogs, water plants, and other biota; and trees including American beech, crapemyrtle, eastern redcedar, and English oak. The conservation garden is a monarch butterfly waystation. In 1989, as part of GU's bicentennial celebration, Professor Donald M. Spoon, who had a lab in the Observatory at the time, organized the dedication of the garden. Father Heyden attended the ceremony. At the time, the garden was full of hundreds of iris species and cultivars, including new ones that Professor Spoon had bred. Currently, Observatory Hill likely has thousands of species of archaeans, bacteria, and eurkaryans, including animals, fungi, plants, and protistans. About 20 pollinator species regularly visit flowers on the Hill.

Currently the observatory is operated and maintained by the Georgetown University Astronomical Society.

== List of directors ==
- James Curley (1843)
- Johann Georg Hagen (1888)
- Edward C. Phillips
- Paul McNally (1928)
- Francis J. Heyden (1948)

== See also ==
- List of astronomical observatories
