= Paul McNally (astronomer) =

American astronomer

Paul A. McNally
- Rev. Paul McNally
- Born: October 14, 1890; Philadelphia, Pennsylvania
- Died: March 4, 1955 (aged 64); Washington, D.C.
- Citizenship: U.S.
- Education: Woodstock College (B.A., M.A.); Fordham University (Ph.D.), Pontifical Gregorian University (STD)
- Known for: Research in astronomy; Dean of Georgetown University School of Medicine; 1946-1953; Fellow of the Royal Astronomical Society
- Scientific career
- Fields: Astronomer; Educator; Cleric & Scientist
- Workplaces: Fordham University; Boston College; Georgetown University

Paul A. McNally (October 14, 1890 – March 4, 1955) was an American astronomer, scientist, and Jesuit priest. He was also a Dean of the Georgetown University School of Medicine.

== Early life ==
McNally was born on October 14, 1890, in Philadelphia. He entered the Society of Jesus on August 12, 1908, and graduated from Woodstock College with a Bachelor of Arts degree in 1915 and a Master of Arts degree in 1917. From 1916 to 1920, McNally was a professor of mathematics at Boston College. In 1916, McNally and Boston College student Paul Gately revived the Boston College Eagles men's basketball team. McNally served as volunteer coach during the 1916–17 season, winning two of the team's five games. From 1917 to 1918, McNally also served as moderator of Boston College's Fulton Debate Society and in 1919 and 1920 he taught German. McNally left BC for Fordham University, where he taught mathematics and moderated the debate society. In 1921 he obtained a Ph.D. in astronomy at Fordham. In 1923 he was ordained at Woodstock College. In 1925 he earned the Doctor of Sacred Theology from Pontifical Gregorian University.

He was elected to fellowship in the Royal Astronomical Society in 1929.

== Director of Georgetown Observatory ==
In 1925, McNally became the assistant director of the Georgetown Observatory. In 1928 he succeeded Rev. Edward C. Phillips, S.J., Ph.D. as the Observatory's director. McNally began work at Georgetown University with rather rudimentary equipment, observing occultations and searching for Herschel's fields using a 12" equatorial visual refractor. Thereafter, two 3" Ross-type astrographic cameras were added, and the focus of the Georgetown Observatory's research was on solar eclipses. McNally photographed the total eclipse at Fryeburg, Maine, in 1932, winning a commendation for that work at the annual meeting of the London Photographic Society. He participated in solar eclipse expeditions that were sponsored by the National Geographic Society in Siberia in 1936; in Canton Island in 1937; and in Patos, Brazil in 1940.

== Administrator ==
In 1942, McNally was made a Vice President of Georgetown University. After the outbreak of World War II, McNally was charged with coordinating all liaison efforts between the science departments at Georgetown University and the U.S. government, regarding the war effort. His success in that role resulted in his subsequent appointment as chief fund-raiser for a new university hospital at Georgetown in 1945. In 1946 McNally was appointed as the Georgetown University School of Medicine's Dean and Regent. That same year he was appointed the first director of the Georgetown University Medical Center.

== Illness and death ==
Father McNally developed symptomatic coronary artery disease in 1952, and had the first of several myocardial infarcts (heart attacks). He resigned his deanship and accepted the position of chairman of Georgetown's physics department. He was succeeded by Francis M. Forster. McNally died on March 4, 1955, at the age of 64, in the midst of a project to organize a graduate program in physics at Georgetown.

The crater McNally on the Moon is named after him.

== See also ==
- List of Jesuit scientists
- List of Roman Catholic scientist-clerics
