= Lincoln's ghost =

Ghost of U.S. president Abraham Lincoln

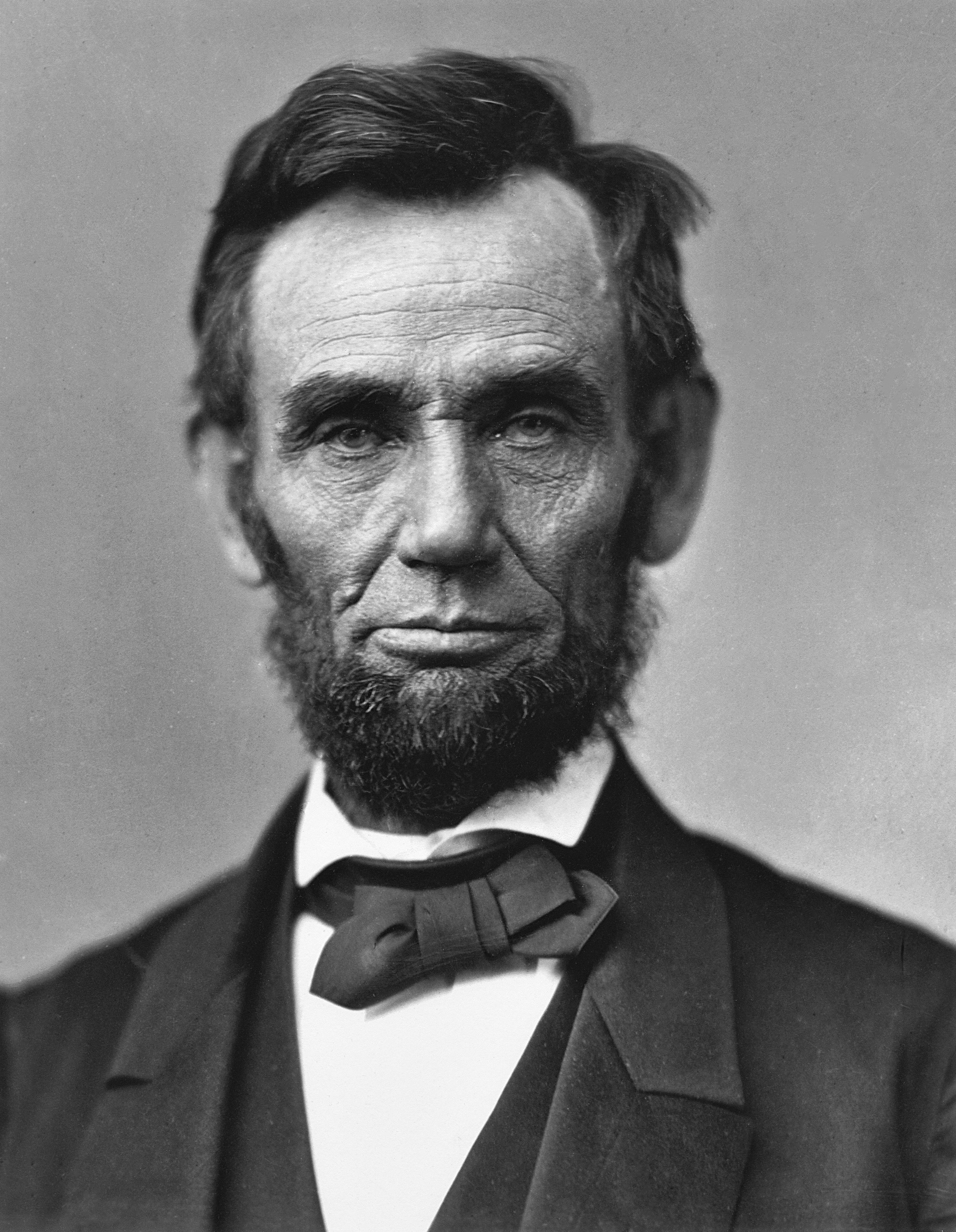
The ghost of Abraham Lincoln is said to haunt the White House.

The ghost of U.S. president Abraham Lincoln, also known as the White House Ghost, is said to have haunted the White House since Lincoln's assassination in 1865. Lincoln's ghost has also been said to haunt many of his former residences in Springfield, Illinois, including his former law office.

Of the several stories about the ghosts of former presidents of the United States revisiting the White House, Lincoln's ghost is perhaps the most common and popular. First Lady Grace Coolidge, Queen Wilhelmina of the Netherlands, Prime Minister Winston Churchill, and President Theodore Roosevelt are among those claimed to have stated they saw Lincoln's ghost in the White House.

== Reported apparitions ==
The White House's most famous alleged apparition is that of Abraham Lincoln. The first person reported to have actually seen Lincoln's spirit was First Lady Grace Coolidge, who said she saw the ghost of Lincoln standing at a window in the Yellow Oval Room staring out at the Potomac in 1927.

Perhaps the most famous incident was in 1942 when Queen Wilhelmina of the Netherlands allegedly heard footsteps outside her White House bedroom and answered a knock on the door, only to see Lincoln in frock coat and top hat standing in front of her (she promptly fainted). According to a Dutch 1996 newspaper article she did not faint, but saw the man, who looked slightly familiar to her, disappear before she could say anything. Queen Wilhelmina returned to bed, but could not sleep. The next morning she suddenly realised who she saw the night before.

British Prime Minister Winston Churchill loved to retire late, take a long, hot bath while drinking a Scotch, and smoke a cigar and relax. There is an account that on this occasion, he climbed out of the bath and naked, but for his cigar, walked into the adjoining bedroom. He was startled to see Lincoln standing by the fireplace in the room, leaning on the mantle. Churchill, always quick on the uptake, simply took his cigar out of his mouth, tapped the ash off the end of his cigar and said "Good evening, Mr. President. You seem to have me at a disadvantage." Lincoln smiled softly, as if laughing and disappeared.

President Theodore Roosevelt, presidential daughter Maureen Reagan, her husband Dennis C. Revell, and a number of staff members of the Franklin D. Roosevelt administration all claimed to have seen Lincoln's spirit. On one occasion Roosevelt's personal valet ran screaming from the White House claiming he had seen Lincoln's ghost. Eleanor Roosevelt never admitted to having seen Lincoln's ghost, but did say that she felt his presence repeatedly throughout the White House. She also said that the Roosevelt family dog, Fala, would sometimes bark for no reason at what she felt was Lincoln's ghost.

President Dwight D. Eisenhower's press secretary, James Hagerty, and Liz Carpenter, press secretary to First Lady Lady Bird Johnson, both said they felt Lincoln's presence many times.

The former president's footsteps are also said to be heard in the hall outside the Lincoln Bedroom. Lillian Rogers Parks stated in her 1961 autobiography My Thirty Years Backstairs at the White House that she had heard them. Margaret Truman, daughter of President Harry S. Truman, said she heard a specter rapping at the door of the Lincoln Bedroom when she stayed there, and believed it was Lincoln. President Truman himself was once awakened by raps at the door while spending a night in the Lincoln Bedroom.

Several unnamed eyewitnesses have claimed to have seen the shade of Abraham Lincoln actually lying down on the bed in the Lincoln Bedroom (which was used as a meeting room at the time of his administration), and while others have seen Lincoln sit on the edge of the bed and put his boots on. The most famous eyewitness to the latter was Mary Eben, Eleanor Roosevelt's secretary, who saw Lincoln pulling on his boots (after which she ran screaming from the room).

Lincoln's ghost was reportedly seen outside of the White House as well. In Loudonville, New York, Lincoln's ghost was said to haunt a house that was owned by a woman who was present at Ford's Theatre when Lincoln was shot by John Wilkes Booth. Other Lincoln hauntings included his grave in Springfield, Illinois, a portrait of Mary Todd Lincoln and a phantom train on nights in April along the same path his funeral train followed from Washington, D.C. to Springfield.

The last reported sighting of Lincoln's ghost was in the early 1980s, when Tony Savoy, White House operations foreman, came into the White House and saw Lincoln sitting in a chair at the top of some stairs.

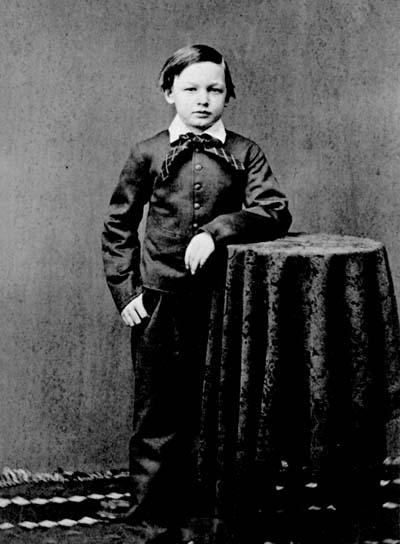
Willie Lincoln died in the White House during his father's presidency.

Abraham Lincoln is not the only Lincoln ghost witnesses claim to have seen in the White House. Willie Lincoln, Abraham Lincoln's 11-year-old son, died in the White House of typhoid on February 20, 1862. Willie Lincoln's ghost was first reported to have been seen in the White House by staff members of the Ulysses S. Grant administration in the 1870s, but reports have been made as recently as the 1960s. President Lyndon B. Johnson's college-age daughter, Lynda Bird Johnson Robb, claims to have seen the ghost and talked to him.

== See also ==
- Reportedly haunted locations in Washington, D.C.
  - The Octagon House
