= United States Capitol Historical Society =

Organization chartered by the US Congress

The United States Capitol Historical Society (USCHS) is an organization chartered by the United States Congress, beginning in 1962, to educate the public on the heritage and history of the United States Capitol, as well as its institutions and those individuals who have served them over time.

== History ==
The Society was established in 1962 as a private non-profit organization. Founded through a bipartisan effort by Congress, the society's creation was spearheaded by its first president, Representative Fred Schwengel of Iowa. The group holds a congressional charter under Title 36 of the United States Code. They have an Oral History collection at the Library of Congress. They offer Fellowships to study the history of the Capitol.

== Awards ==
In 2004, The United States Capitol Historical Society was one of eight recipients of the National Humanities Medal from the National Endowment for the Humanities conferred by President George W. Bush.

== Today ==
The society is governed by a fifty-person Board of Trustees who have past involvement with the Capitol.
