= List of American films of 1982 =

This is a list of American films released in 1982.

== Box office ==
The highest-grossing American films released in 1982, by domestic box office gross revenue, are as follows:

Highest-grossing films of 1982
Rank	Title	Distributor	Domestic gross
1	E.T. the Extra-Terrestrial	Universal	$359,197,037
2	Tootsie	Columbia	$177,200,000
3	An Officer and a Gentleman	Paramount	$129,795,554
4	Rocky III	United Artists	$124,146,897
5	Porky's	20th Century Fox	$105,492,483
6	Star Trek II: The Wrath of Khan	Paramount	$78,912,963
7	48 Hrs.	Paramount	$78,868,508
8	Poltergeist	MGM	$76,606,280
9	The Best Little Whorehouse in Texas	Universal	$69,701,637
10	Annie	Columbia	$57,059,003

== January–March ==
Opening		Title	Production company	Cast and crew	Ref.
J A N U A R Y	1	Madman	Jensen Farley Pictures	Joe Giannone (director/screenplay); Gaylen Ross, Paul Ehlers, Tony Fish, Harriet Bass, Seth Jones, Jan Claire, Alex Murphy, Jimmy Steele, Carl Fredericks, Michael Sullivan	
J A N U A R Y	22	Death Valley	Universal Pictures / Cinema VII	Dick Richards (director); Richard Rothstein (screenplay); Paul Le Mat, Catherine Hicks, Stephen McHattie, Wilford Brimley, Peter Billingsley, Edward Herrmann, Earl W. Smith, Jack O'Leary, Mary Steelsmith, Gina Christian, Kirk I. Kiskella, Frank J. Cimorelli, Arnold C. Waterman, Fred W.S. Newton, J.P.S. Brown, Roy S. Gunsberg, Merritt Holloway, Glenn McCreedy, Allan Wood	
J A N U A R Y	22	The Seduction	Embassy Pictures	David Schmoeller (director/screenplay); Morgan Fairchild, Michael Sarrazin, Vince Edwards, Andrew Stevens, Colleen Camp, Kevin Brophy, Betty Kean, Joanne Linville, Wendy Smith Howard, Marri Mak	
J A N U A R Y	22	Shoot the Moon	MGM/UA Entertainment Company	Alan Parker (director); Bo Goldman (screenplay); Albert Finney, Diane Keaton, Karen Allen, Peter Weller, Dana Hill, Viveka Davis, Tracey Gold, Tina Yothers, George Murdock, Leora Dana, Irving Metzman, Robert Costanzo, David Landsberg, O-Lan Shepard	
J A N U A R Y	22	Vice Squad	Embassy Pictures	Gary Sherman (director/screenplay); Sandy Howard, Robert Vincent O'Neil, Kenneth Peter (screenplay); Season Hubley, Gary Swanson, Wings Hauser, Pepe Serna, Beverly Todd, Nina Blackwood, Fred Berry, Grand L. Bush, Michael Ensign, Stack Pierce, Joseph DiGiroloma, Maurice Emanuel, Sudana Bobatoon, Lydia Lei, Kelly Piper, Kristoffer Anders, Joseph Baroncini, Stacy Everly, Cyndi James-Reese	
J A N U A R Y	29	The Border	Universal Pictures / RKO Pictures	Tony Richardson (director); Deric Washburn, Walon Green, David Freeman (screenplay); Jack Nicholson, Harvey Keitel, Valerie Perrine, Warren Oates, Elpidia Carrillo, Dirk Blocker, Jeff Morris	
F E B R U A R Y	5	Butterfly	Analysis Releasing / Par-Par Productions	Matt Cimber (director/screenplay); John F. Goff (screenplay); Stacy Keach, Pia Zadora, Ed McMahon, Orson Welles, Lois Nettleton, Edward Albert, James Franciscus, Stuart Whitman, June Lockhart, Ann Dane, George Buck Flower, John O'Conner White, Paul Hampton, Peter Jason	
F E B R U A R Y	5	Night Crossing	Walt Disney Productions / Buena Vista Distribution	Delbert Mann (director); John McGreevey (screenplay); John Hurt, Jane Alexander, Glynnis O'Connor, Doug McKeon, Beau Bridges, Ian Bannen, Keith McKeon, Klaus Löwitsch, Geoffrey Liesik, Michael Liesik, Anne Stallybrass, Matthew Taylor, Günter Meisner, Sky Dumont, Jan Niklas	
F E B R U A R Y	5	Personal Best	The Geffen Film Company	Robert Towne (director/screenplay); Mariel Hemingway, Scott Glenn, Patrice Donnelly, Kenny Moore, Evelyn Ashford, Jodi Anderson, Maren Seidler, Martha Watson, Emily Dole, Pam Spencer, Deby LaPlante, Jan Van Reenen, Al Feuerbach, Jane Frederick, Cindy Gilbert, Milan Tiff, Earl Bell, Frank Shorter, Themis Zambrzycki, John Smith, Charlie Jones, Len Dawson, Mitzi McMillin, Jan Glotzer, Marlene Harmon, Linda Waltman, Cindy Banks, Jim Tracy, Sharon Brazell, Susan Brownell, Desiree Gauthier, Sharon Hatfield, Linda Hightower, Joan Russell, Clim Jackson, Chuck DeBus, Robert Horn	
F E B R U A R Y	11	One from the Heart	Columbia Pictures / Zoetrope Studios	Francis Ford Coppola (director/screenplay); Armyan Bernstein (screenplay); Frederic Forrest, Teri Garr, Raúl Juliá, Nastassja Kinski, Lainie Kazan, Harry Dean Stanton, Allen Garfield, Rebecca De Mornay, Carmine Coppola, Italia Coppola	
F E B R U A R Y	12	The Amateur	20th Century Fox	Charles Jarrott (director); Robert Littell, Diana Maddox (screenplay); John Savage, Christopher Plummer, Marthe Keller, Arthur Hill, Nicholas Campbell, George Coe, John Marley, Ed Lauter	
F E B R U A R Y	12	The Beast Within	United Artists / Katzka	Philippe Mora (director); Tom Holland (screenplay); Ronny Cox, Bibi Besch, Paul Clemens, Don Gordon, R.G. Armstrong, Katherine Moffat, L.Q. Jones, Logan Ramsey, John Dennis Johnston, Ron Soble, Luke Askew, Meshach Taylor, Boyce Holleman	
F E B R U A R Y	12	Cannery Row	MGM/UA Entertainment Company	David S. Ward (director/screenplay); William Graham (screenplay); Nick Nolte, Debra Winger, Audra Lindley, M. Emmet Walsh, Sunshine Parker, Rosanna DeSoto, Frank McRae, Anne Lockhart, John Huston, Tom Mahoney, John Malloy, James Keane, Santos Morales	
F E B R U A R Y	12	Love and Money	Paramount Pictures / Lorimar	James Toback (director/screenplay); Ray Sharkey, Ornella Muti, Klaus Kinski, Armand Assante, King Vidor, William Prince, Anthony Sirico, Jacqueline Brookes, Rodolfo Hoyos, Jr., Tom McFadden, Tony Plana	
F E B R U A R Y	12	Making Love	20th Century Fox	Arthur Hiller (director); Barry Sandler (screenplay); Michael Ontkean, Harry Hamlin, Kate Jackson, Wendy Hiller, Arthur Hill, Nancy Olson	
F E B R U A R Y	12	Missing	Universal Pictures / PolyGram Filmed Entertainment	Costa-Gavras (director/screenplay); Donald E. Stewart (screenplay); Jack Lemmon, Sissy Spacek, Melanie Mayron, John Shea, Charles Cioffi, David Clennon, Richard Venture, Jerry Hardin, Richard Bradford, Joe Regalbuto, Keith Szarabajka, John Doolittle, Janice Rule, Ward Costello, Hansford Rowe, Tina Romero	
F E B R U A R Y	12	Quest for Fire	20th Century Fox	Jean-Jacques Annaud (director); Gerard Brach (screenplay); Everett McGill, Ron Perlman, Rae Dawn Chong, Nameer El-Kadi, Gary Schwartz, Joy Boushel, George Buza, Antonio Barichievich, Naseer El-Kadi, Franck-Olivier Bonnet, Jean-Michel Kindt, Kurt Schiegl, Brian Gill, Terry Fitt, Bibi Caspari, Peter Elliott, Michelle Leduc, Robert Lavoie, Matt Birman, Christian Benard, Tarlok Sing Seva, Lolamal Kapisisi	
F E B R U A R Y	19	Barbarosa	Universal Pictures / Associated Film Distribution / ITC Entertainment	Fred Schepisi (director); William D. Wittliff (screenplay); Willie Nelson, Gary Busey, Gilbert Roland, Isela Vega, Danny De La Paz, Alma Martinez, George Voskovec, Sharon Compton, Howland Chamberlain, Harry Caesar, Wolf Muser, Kai Wulff, Roberto Contreras, Luis Contreras, Jake Busey, Itasco Wilson, Michael O'Rourke, Allison Wittliff	
F E B R U A R Y	19	Swamp Thing	Embassy Pictures / Swampfilms	Wes Craven (director/screenplay); Louis Jourdan, Adrienne Barbeau, Ray Wise, Dick Durock, David Hess, Nicholas Worth, Don Knight, Karen Price, Al Ruban, Nannette Brown, Reggie Batts	
F E B R U A R Y	20	Death Wish II	Filmways Pictures / American-European Productions / Golan-Globus Productions / Landers-Roberts Productions / City Films	Michael Winner (director); David Engelbach (screenplay); Charles Bronson, Jill Ireland, Vincent Gardenia, J.D. Cannon, Anthony Franciosa, Robin Sherwood, Charles Cyphers, Ben Frank, Paul Comi, Michael Prince, Thomas F. Duffy, Larry Fishburne, Kevyn Major Howard, Stuart K. Robinson, E. Lamont Johnson, Silvana Gallardo, Robert F. Lyons, Frank Campanella, Don Dubbins, Buck Young, Jim Begg, Melody Santangello	
F E B R U A R Y	26	Evilspeak	Moreno Films / Warner Bros. / Leisure Investment Company / Coronet Film	Eric Weston (director/screenplay); Joseph Garofalo (screenplay); Clint Howard, R.G. Armstrong, Joe Cortese, Claude Earl Jones, Haywood Nelson, Don Stark, Charles Tyner, Hamilton Camp, Loren Lester, Lenny Montana, Richard Moll, Louie Gravance, Jim Greenleaf, Lynn Hancock, Leonard D'John	
M A R C H	5	Evil Under the Sun	Universal Pictures / Associated Film Distribution / EMI Films / Titan Productions / Mersham Productions Ltd.	Guy Hamilton (director); Anthony Shaffer (screenplay); Peter Ustinov, Jane Birkin, Colin Blakely, Nicholas Clay, James Mason, Roddy McDowall, Sylvia Miles, Denis Quilley, Diana Rigg, Maggie Smith, Emily Hone	
M A R C H	5	Fitzcarraldo	Filmverlag der Autoren / Werner Herzog Filmproduktion / Pro-ject Filmproduktion	Werner Herzog (director/screenplay); Klaus Kinski, Claudia Cardinale, José Lewgoy, Miguel Ángel Fuentes, Paul Hittscher, Huerequeque Enrique Bohórquez, Grande Otelo, Peter Berling, Milton Nascimento, Jean-Claude Dreyfus, David Pérez Espinosa, Ruy Polanah, Salvator Godínez, Dieter Miltz, William "Bill" Rose, Leôncio Bueno	
M A R C H	5	I'm Dancing as Fast as I Can	Paramount Pictures	Jack Hofsiss (director); David Rabe (screenplay); Jill Clayburgh, Nicol Williamson, Geraldine Page, Dianne Wiest, Albert Salmi, James Sutorius, Ellen Greene, Joseph Maher, Joe Pesci, Daniel Stern, Dan Hedaya, Kathleen Widdoes, Richard Masur, John Lithgow, David Margulies	
M A R C H	12	Parasite	Embassy Pictures	Charles Band (director); Michael Shoob, Alan J. Adler, Frank Levering (screenplay); Robert Glaudini, Demi Moore, Luca Bercovici, Cherie Currie, Vivian Blaine, Tom Villard, Freddy Moore, James Davidson, Al Fann	
M A R C H	12	Richard Pryor: Live on the Sunset Strip	Columbia Pictures / Rastar	Joe Layton (director); Paul Mooney, Richard Pryor (screenplay); Richard Pryor, Jesse Jackson, Gene Cross, Julie Hampton	
M A R C H	19	Deathtrap	Warner Bros.	Sidney Lumet (director); Jay Presson Allen (screenplay); Michael Caine, Christopher Reeve, Dyan Cannon, Irene Worth, Henry Jones, Joe Silver, Jeffrey Lyons, Joel Siegel	
M A R C H	19	Victor/Victoria	Metro-Goldwyn-Mayer / Pinewood Studios	Blake Edwards (director/screenplay); Julie Andrews, James Garner, Robert Preston, Lesley Ann Warren, Alex Karras, John Rhys-Davies, Graham Stark, Peter Arne, Ina Skriver, Michael Robbins, Maria Charles, Glen Murphy, Geoffrey Beevers, Norman Alden, Jay Benedict, Malcolm Jamieson, Sherloque Tanney, Norman Chancer, David Gant	
M A R C H	24	Eating Raoul	20th Century Fox International Classics / Quartet/Films Inc.	Paul Bartel (director/screenplay); Richard Blackburn (screenplay); Paul Bartel, Mary Woronov, Robert Beltran, Susan Saiger, Ed Begley Jr., Buck Henry, Edie McClurg, Richard Paul, Hamilton Camp, John Paragon, John Shearin	
M A R C H	26	Robin Hood (re-release)	Walt Disney Productions / Buena Vista Distribution	Wolfgang Reitherman (director); Larry Clemmons, Ken Anderson, Vance Gerry, Frank Thomas, Eric Cleworth, Julius Svendsen, David Michener (screenplay); Peter Ustinov, Phil Harris, Brian Bedford, Terry-Thomas, Roger Miller, Pat Buttram, George Lindsey, Andy Devine, Monica Evans, Carole Shelley, Ken Curtis, John Fiedler, Barbara Luddy, Candy Candido, J. Pat O'Malley, Don Bluth, Stan Freberg, Hal Smith, Billy Whitaker, Dana Laurita, Dori Whitaker, Richie Sanders	
M A R C H	26	I Ought to Be in Pictures	20th Century Fox	Herbert Ross (director); Neil Simon (screenplay); Walter Matthau, Ann-Margret, Dinah Manoff, Lance Guest, Larry Barton, Eugene Butler, Michael Dudikoff, David Faustino, Martin Ferrero, Allan Graf, Art LaFleur, Lewis Smith, Tom Wright, Calvin Ander, Shelby Balik, Samantha Harper	

== April–June ==
Opening		Title	Production company	Cast and crew	Ref.
A P R I L	2	A Little Sex	Universal Pictures / MTM Enterprises	Bruce Paltrow (director); Bob DeLaurentis (screenplay); Tim Matheson, Kate Capshaw, Edward Herrmann, John Glover, Joan Copeland, Susanna Dalton, Wendie Malick, Wallace Shawn	
A P R I L	2	Cat People	Universal Pictures / RKO Pictures	Paul Schrader (director); Alan Ormsby (screenplay); Nastassja Kinski, Malcolm McDowell, John Heard, Annette O'Toole, Ruby Dee, Ed Begley Jr., Scott Paulin, Frankie Faison, Ron Diamond, Lynn Lowry, John Larroquette, Tessa Richarde, Berry Berenson, Don Hood	
A P R I L	2	Fantasia (re-release)	Walt Disney Productions / RKO Radio Pictures	Samuel Armstrong, James Algar, Bill Roberts, Paul Satterfield, Ben Sharpsteen, David D. Hand, Hamilton Luske, Jim Handley, Ford Beebe, T. Hee, Norman Ferguson, Wilfred Jackson (director); Irwin Kostal, Hugh Douglas	
A P R I L	2	Pandemonium	MGM/UA Entertainment Company	Alfred Sole (director); Jaime Klein, Richard Whitley (screenplay); Carol Kane, Paul Reubens, Eve Arden, Candice Azzara, Tom Smothers, Eileen Brennan, Judge Reinhold, Kaye Ballard, Donald O'Connor, Tab Hunter, David L. Lander, Phil Hartman, Debralee Scott, Marc McClure, Teri Landrum	
A P R I L	2	Penitentiary II	MGM/UA Entertainment Company	Jamaa Fanaka (director/screenplay); Leon Isaac Kennedy, Eugenia Wright, Glynn Turman, Mr. T, Ernie Hudson, Peggy Blow	
A P R I L	2	Silent Rage	Columbia Pictures / Topkick Productions	Michael Miller (director); Edward Di Lorenzo, Joseph Fraley (screenplay); Chuck Norris, Brian Libby, Ron Silver, Steven Keats, Toni Kalem, William Finley, Stephen Furst, Stephanie Dunnam	
A P R I L	2	Some Kind of Hero	Paramount Pictures	Michael Pressman (director); Robert Boris, James Kirkwood Jr. (screenplay); Richard Pryor, Margot Kidder, Ray Sharkey, Ronny Cox, Lynne Moody, Paul Benjamin, Olivia Cole, Matt Clark	
A P R I L	7	Basket Case	Analysis Film Releasing Corporation / Rugged Films / Basket Case Productions	Frank Henenlotter (director/screenplay); Kevin Van Hentenryck, Terri Susan Smith, Beverly Bonner, Robert Vogel, Diana Browne, Lloyd Pace, Bill Freeman, Joe Clarke	
A P R I L	23	Chan Is Missing	New Yorker Films	Wayne Wang (director/screenplay); Isaac Cronin, Terrel Seltzer (screenplay); Wood Moy, Marc Hayashi	
A P R I L	23	I, the Jury	20th Century Fox / Columbia-EMI-Warner / American Cinema Productions / Larco Productions / Pellepont / Solofilm	Richard T. Heffron (director); Larry Cohen (screenplay); Armand Assante, Barbara Carrera, Laurene Landon, Alan King, Geoffrey Lewis, Paul Sorvino, Judson Scott, Barry Snider, Julia Barr	
A P R I L	23	If You Could See What I Hear	Jensen Farley Pictures / Ciné 360 Inc.	Eric Till (director); Derek Gill, Stuart Gillard (screenplay); Marc Singer, R.H. Thomson, Shari Belafonte, Harvey Atkin, Helen Burns, Douglas Campbell, Nonnie Griffin, David Gardner, Sharon Lewis, Adrienne Pocock, Sarah Torgov, Greer Forward	
A P R I L	23	The Sword and the Sorcerer	Group 1 International Distribution Organization Ltd.	Albert Pyun (director/screenplay); Tom Karnowski, John V. Stuckmeyer (screenplay); Lee Horsley, Kathleen Beller, Simon MacCorkindale, George Maharis, Richard Lynch, Richard Moll, Anthony De Longis, Robert Tessier, Christopher Cary, Nina Van Pallandt, Anna Bjorn, Christina Nigra, Jeff Corey, Joseph Ruskin, Reb Brown, Shelley Taylor Morgan, Joe Regalbuto, Earl Maynard, Russ Marin	
A P R I L	23	Tag: The Assassination Game	Ginis Films	Nick Castle (director/screenplay); Robert Carradine, Linda Hamilton, Kristine DeBell, Perry Lang, John Mengatti, Michael Winslow, Frazer Smith, Xander Berkeley, Bruce Abbott, Ivan Bonar, Forest Whitaker, Scott Dunlop, Jim Greenleaf, Charlene Nelson	
A P R I L	30	Next of Kin	Roadshow Film Distributors / The Film House / S.I.S. Productions / Filmco	Tony Williams (director/screenplay); Michael Heath (screenplay); Jacki Kerin as Linda Stevens, John Jarratt, Alex Scott, Gerda Nicolson, Charles McCallum, Bernadette Gibson, Robert Ratti, Vince Deltito, Tommy Dysart, Debra Lawrance, Matt Burns, Kristina Marshall	
A P R I L	30	Partners	Paramount Pictures / Aaron Russo Productions	James Burrows (director); Francis Veber (screenplay); Ryan O'Neal, John Hurt, Kenneth McMillan, Robyn Douglass, Jay Robinson, Denise Galik, Rick Jason, James Remar, Darrell Larson, Seamon Glass, Michael McGuire, Joseph R. Sicari, Jennifer Ashley, Tony March, Steven Reisch	
A P R I L	30	Soup for One	Warner Bros.	Jonathan Kaufer (director/screenplay); Saul Rubinek, Marcia Strassman, Gerrit Graham, Teddy Pendergrass, Richard Libertini, Andrea Martin, Mordecai Lawner, Lewis J. Stadlen, Joanna Merlin, Christine Baranski, Maury Chaykin, Deborah Offner, Michael Jeter, Anna Deavere Smith, Laura Dean, Andrew Friedman, Kate Lynch, Suzzy Roche, Claudia Cron, Hilary Shepard, James Rebhorn, Jack Chandler, Michael Pearlman, Maggie Wheeler, Kim Chan, Lisa Parker, Marley Friedman, Jessica James, Gloria Cromwell, Lauren Sautner, Merwin Goldsmith	
M A Y	7	Diner	MGM/UA Entertainment Company	Barry Levinson (director/screenplay); Steve Guttenberg, Daniel Stern, Mickey Rourke, Kevin Bacon, Timothy Daly, Ellen Barkin, Paul Reiser, Michael Tucker, Kathryn Dowling, Colette Blonigan, Jessica James, Clement Fowler, Kelle Kipp	
M A Y	7	Forbidden World	New World Pictures	Allan Holzman (director); Tim Curnen (screenplay); Jesse Vint, Dawn Dunlap, June Chadwick, Linden Chiles, Fox Harris, Raymond Oliver, Scott Paulin, Michael Bowen, Don Olivera	
M A Y	7	Paradise	Avco Embassy Pictures	Stuart Gillard (director/screenplay); Phoebe Cates, Willie Aames, Yosef Shiloach, Tuvia Tavi, Richard Curnock, Neil Vipond, Aviva Marks	
M A Y	14	Conan the Barbarian	Universal Pictures / Dino De Laurentiis Corporation	John Milius (director/screenplay); Oliver Stone (screenplay); Arnold Schwarzenegger, James Earl Jones, Sandahl Bergman, Ben Davidson, Cassandra Gava, Gerry Lopez, Mako, Valérie Quennessen, William Smith, Max von Sydow, Sven-Ole Thorsen, Jorge Sanz, Nadiuska	
M A Y	14	The House Where Evil Dwells	MGM/UA Entertainment Company / Cohen / Commercial Credit Holdings / Toei Company	Kevin Connor (director); Robert Suhosky (screenplay); Edward Albert, Susan George, Doug McClure, Amy Barrett, Mako Hattori, Tsuiyuki Sasaki, Toshiya Maruyama, Tsuyako Okajima, Henry Mittwer, Mayumi Umeda, Shuren Sakurai, Hiroko Takano, Shoji Ohara, Jiro Shirai, Kazuo Yoshida, Kunihiko Shinjo, Gentaro Mori, Tomoko Shimizu, Misao Arai, Chiyoko Hardiman, Hideo Shimado	
M A Y	14	The Return of the Soldier	20th Century Fox	Alan Bridges (director); Hugh Whitemore (screenplay); Alan Bates, Julie Christie, Glenda Jackson, Ann-Margret, Ian Holm, Frank Finlay, Jeremy Kemp, Hilary Mason, John Sharp	
M A Y	14	Wrong Is Right	Columbia Pictures	Richard Brooks (director/screenplay); Sean Connery, Robert Conrad, George Grizzard, Katharine Ross, G.D. Spradlin, John Saxon, Henry Silva, Leslie Nielsen, Hardy Krüger, Robert Webber, Ron Moody, Rosalind Cash, Dean Stockwell, Cherie Michan, Jennifer Jason Leigh, Mickey Jones	
M A Y	21	Annie	Columbia Pictures / Rastar	John Huston (director); Carol Sobieski (screenplay); Aileen Quinn, Albert Finney, Carol Burnett, Bernadette Peters, Ann Reinking, Tim Curry, Geoffrey Holder, Edward Herrmann, Lois de Banzie, Toni Ann Gisondi, Rosanne Sorrentino, April Lerman, Robin Ignico, Peter Marshall, Irving Metzman, Ken Swofford, Colleen Zenk, Pamela Blair, Lu Leonard, Angela Lee, Martika, Amanda Peterson, Shawnee Smith, Fritzi Jane Courtney, Tim Scott, Roger Minami, Lara Berk, Lucie Stewart, I.M. Hobson, Mavis Ray, Victor Griffin, Jerome Collamore, Jon Richards	
M A Y	21	Dead Men Don't Wear Plaid	Universal Pictures / Aspen Film Society	Carl Reiner (director/screenplay); George Gipe, Steve Martin (screenplay); Steve Martin, Rachel Ward, George Gaynes, Reni Santoni, Adrian Ricard, Carl Reiner, Francis X. McCarthy, Gene LeBell, Alan Ladd, Barbara Stanwyck, Ray Milland, Ava Gardner, Burt Lancaster, Humphrey Bogart, Cary Grant, Ingrid Bergman, Veronica Lake, Bette Davis, Lana Turner, Edward Arnold, Kirk Douglas, Fred MacMurray, James Cagney, Joan Crawford, Charles Laughton, Vincent Price	
M A Y	21	Fighting Back	Paramount Pictures / Paramount Famous Productions	Lewis Teague (director); Thomas Hedley Jr., David Zelag Goodman (screenplay); Tom Skerritt, Patti LuPone, Michael Sarrazin, Yaphet Kotto, David Rasche, Lewis Van Bergen, Earle Hyman, Ted Ross, Frank Sivero, Pat Cooper, Allan Graf, Donna de Varona, Jim Moody, Paul Rawson, Gina DeAngelis, Jonathan Adam Sherman, Pete Richardson, Joseph Rangno, Sal Richards	
M A Y	28	Britannia Hospital	EMI Films	Lindsay Anderson (director); David Sherwin (screenplay); Leonard Rossiter, Graham Crowden, Malcolm McDowell, Joan Plowright, Jill Bennett, Marsha Hunt, Brian Pettifer, John Moffatt, Fulton Mackay, Vivian Pickles, Barbara Hicks, Peter Jeffrey, Mary MacLeod, Robin Askwith, Dave Atkins, Mark Hamill, Frank Grimes, Gladys Crosbie, Richard Griffiths, Arthur Lowe, Alan Bates, Dandy Nichols, Betty Marsden, Liz Smith, T.P. McKenna, Michael Medwin, Roland Culver, Valentine Dyall, Tony Haygarth, John Gordon Sinclair, Brian Glover, Mike Grady, Kevin Lloyd, Robert Pugh, Robbie Coltrane, Patsy Byrne, Edward Hibbert	
M A Y	28	The Escape Artist	Orion Pictures / Zoetrope Studios / Warner Bros. Pictures	Caleb Deschanel (director); Melissa Mathison, Stephen Zito (screenplay); Raúl Juliá, Griffin O'Neal, Teri Garr, Joan Hackett, Gabriel Dell, Desi Arnaz, John P. Ryan, Elizabeth Daily, M. Emmet Walsh, Jackie Coogan, Hal Williams, Helen Page Camp, David Clennon, Huntz Hall, Harry Anderson, Carlin Glynn, Margaret Ladd, Doug McGrath, Richard Bradford	
M A Y	28	Rocky III	MGM/UA Entertainment Co. / United Artists	Sylvester Stallone (director/screenplay); Sylvester Stallone, Talia Shire, Burt Young, Carl Weathers, Burgess Meredith, Mr. T, Tony Burton, Ian Fried, Hulk Hogan, Stu Nahan, Jimmy Lennon, Lou Filippo, Dennis James, Jim Healy, LeRoy Neiman, Jim Hill, Morgan Freeman, Jim Henson, Bill Baldwin, Marty Denkin	
M A Y	28	Visiting Hours	20th Century Fox	Jean-Claude Lord (director); Brian Taggert (screenplay); Lee Grant, Michael Ironside, Linda Purl, William Shatner, Lenore Zann, Harvey Atkin, Michael J. Reynolds, Len Watt, Kirsten Bishop, Robbie Robinson, Lorena Gale	
J U N E	4	The Chosen	20th Century Fox / Analysis Film Releasing Corporation	Jeremy Kagan (director); Edwin Gordon (screenplay); Maximilian Schell, Rod Steiger, Robby Benson, Barry Miller, Hildy Brooks, Kaethe Fine, Ron Rifkin, Robert Burke, Lonny Price, Evan Handler, Douglas Warhit, Jeff Marcus, Stuart Charno, John Pankow, Richard Ziman, Val Avery	
J U N E	4	Bambi (re-release)	Walt Disney Productions / RKO Radio Pictures	David Hand, James Algar, Samuel Armstrong, Graham Heid, Bill Roberts, Paul Satterfield, Norman Wright (director); Perce Pearce, Larry Morey, Vernon Stallings, Melvin Shaw, Carl Fallberg, Chuck Couch, Ralph Wright (screenplay); Donnie Dunagan, Hardie Albright, John Sutherland, Peter Behn, Tim Davis, Sam Edwards, Paula Winslowe, Stan Alexander, Sterling Holloway, Will Wright, Cammie King, Ann Gillis, Fred Shields, Margaret Lee, Mary Lansing, Perce Pearce, Thelma Boardman	
J U N E	4	Hanky Panky	Columbia Pictures	Sidney Poitier (director); Henry Rosenbaum, David Taylor (screenplay); Gene Wilder, Gilda Radner, Richard Widmark, Kathleen Quinlan, Robert Prosky, Josef Sommer, Johnny Sekka, Johnny Brown, Jay O. Sanders, Sam Gray, Larry Bryggman	
J U N E	4	Poltergeist	MGM/UA Entertainment Co. / SLM Production Group / Mist Entertainment / Amblin Productions	Tobe Hooper (director); Steven Spielberg, Michael Grais, Mark Victor (screenplay); JoBeth Williams, Craig T. Nelson, Beatrice Straight, Dominique Dunne, Oliver Robins, Heather O'Rourke, Martin Casella, Richard Lawson, Zelda Rubinstein, James Karen, Dirk Blocker, Michael McManus, Helen Baron, Virginia Kiser, Allan Graf, Robert Broyles, Lou Perry, Sonny Landham, Phil Stone, Sheb Wooley	
J U N E	4	Star Trek II: The Wrath of Khan	Paramount Pictures	Nicholas Meyer (director); Jack B. Sowards (screenplay); William Shatner, Leonard Nimoy, Ricardo Montalbán, DeForest Kelley, James Doohan, George Takei, Walter Koenig, Nichelle Nichols, Bibi Besch, Merritt Butrick, Paul Winfield, Kirstie Alley, Ike Eisenmann, John Vargas, Nicholas Guest, Kevin Rodney Sullivan, Harve Bennett, James Horner, Tom Morga, Judson Scott	
J U N E	11	E.T. the Extra-Terrestrial	Universal Pictures / Amblin Entertainment	Steven Spielberg (director); Melissa Mathison (screenplay); Henry Thomas, Dee Wallace, Peter Coyote, Robert MacNaughton, Drew Barrymore, K.C. Martel, C. Thomas Howell, Sean Frye, Erika Eleniak, Pat Welsh, Anne Lockhart	
J U N E	11	Grease 2	Paramount Pictures	Patricia Birch (director); Ken Finkleman (screenplay); Maxwell Caulfield, Michelle Pfeiffer, Adrian Zmed, Christopher McDonald, Peter Frechette, Leif Green, Lorna Luft, Maureen Teefy, Alison Price, Pamela Segall, Didi Conn, Eve Arden, Sid Caesar, Dody Goodman, Eddie Deezen, Dennis C. Stewart, Dick Patterson, Tab Hunter, Connie Stevens, Jean Sagal, Liz Sagal, Matt Lattanzi, Donna King, Lucinda Dickey, Ivy Austin, Andy Tennant, Tom Villard, Tom Willett, Janet Jones, John Allee, Vernon Scott	
J U N E	18	Author! Author!	20th Century Fox	Arthur Hiller (director); Israel Horovitz (screenplay); Al Pacino, Dyan Cannon, Tuesday Weld, Alan King, Bob Dishy, Bob Elliott, Ray Goulding, Eric Gurry, Ari Meyers, Margo Winkler, Adam Winkler, Rachael Horovitz, Elva Leff, B.J. Barie, Benjamin H. Carlin	
J U N E	18	Firefox	Warner Bros. / Malpaso Productions	Clint Eastwood (director); Alex Lasker, Wendell Wellman (screenplay); Clint Eastwood, Freddie Jones, David Huffman, Warren Clarke, Ronald Lacey, Kenneth Colley, Klaus Löwitsch, Nigel Hawthorne, Stefan Schnabel, Thomas Hill, Clive Merrison, Kai Wulff, Dimitra Arliss, Austin Willis, Michael Currie, Alan Tilvern, Hugh Fraser, Wolf Kahler	
J U N E	25	Blade Runner	Warner Bros. / The Ladd Company / Shaw Brothers / Blade Runner Partnership	Ridley Scott (director); Hampton Fancher, David Peoples (screenplay); Harrison Ford, Rutger Hauer, Sean Young, Edward James Olmos, M. Emmet Walsh, Daryl Hannah, William Sanderson, Brion James, Joe Turkel, Joanna Cassidy, James Hong, Morgan Paull, Hy Pyke	
J U N E	25	Megaforce	20th Century Fox / Golden Harvest / Northshore Investments Ltd.	Hal Needham (director/screenplay); James Whitaker, Albert S. Ruddy, André Morgan (screenplay); Barry Bostwick, Michael Beck, Persis Khambatta, Edward Mulhare, George Furth, Henry Silva, Ralph Wilcox, Evan C. Kim, Robert Fuller, Anthony Pena, Michael Kulcsar, J. Victor López, Michael Carven	
J U N E	25	The Thing	Universal Pictures / The Turman-Foster Company	John Carpenter (director); Bill Lancaster (screenplay); Kurt Russell, A. Wilford Brimley, T.K. Carter, David Clennon, Keith David, Richard Dysart, Charles Hallahan, Peter Maloney, Richard Masur, Donald Moffat, Joel Polis, Thomas Waites	

== July–September ==
Opening		Title	Production company	Cast and crew	Ref.
J U L Y	2	The Secret of NIMH	MGM/UA Entertainment Company / Aurora Productions / Don Bluth Studios	Don Bluth (director/screenplay); Gary Goldman, John Pomeroy, Will Finn (screenplay); Elizabeth Hartman, Hermione Baddeley, John Carradine, Dom DeLuise, Derek Jacobi, Arthur Malet, Paul Shenar, Peter Strauss, Aldo Ray, Shannen Doherty, Wil Wheaton, Ian Fried, Edie McClurg, Tom Hatten, Lucille Bliss, Charles Champlin, Dick Kleiner, Jodi Hicks, Joshua Lawrence, Norbert Auerbach	
J U L Y	9	Tron	Walt Disney Productions / Buena Vista Distribution / Lisberger-Kushner Productions	Steven Lisberger (director/screenplay); Jeff Bridges, Bruce Boxleitner, David Warner, Cindy Morgan, Barnard Hughes, Dan Shor, Peter Jurasik, Tony Stephano	
J U L Y	16	A Midsummer Night's Sex Comedy	Orion Pictures / Warner Bros.	Woody Allen (director/screenplay); Woody Allen, Mia Farrow, José Ferrer, Julie Hagerty, Tony Roberts, Mary Steenburgen, Michael Higgins, Adam Redfield, Moishe Rosenfeld, Timothy Jenkins, Sol Frieder, Boris Zoubok, Thomas Barbour, Kate McGregor-Stewart	
J U L Y	16	Six Pack	20th Century Fox	Daniel Petrie (director); Mike Marvin, Alex Matter (screenplay); Kenny Rogers, Diane Lane, Erin Gray, Barry Corbin, Terry Kiser, Don Hannah, Anthony Michael Hall, Buddy Baker, Chuck Woolery, Tom Abernathy, Robbie Fleming, Robby Still, Benji Wilhoite, Melanie McMullan	
J U L Y	16	Summer Lovers	Filmways / Research Corporation	Randal Kleiser (director/screenplay); Peter Gallagher, Daryl Hannah, Valérie Quennessen, Barbara Rush, Carole Cook, Hans van Tongeren, Rika Dialina, Lydia Lenosi, Vladimiros Kiriakidis, Carlos Rodriguez Ramos, Henri Behar, Andreas Filipidis	
J U L Y	16	Young Doctors in Love	20th Century Fox / ABC Motion Pictures	Garry Marshall (director); Michael Elias, Rich Eustis (screenplay); Michael McKean, Sean Young, Hector Elizondo, Harry Dean Stanton, Patrick Macnee, Dabney Coleman, Gary Friedkin, Kyle T. Heffner, Rick Overton, Crystal Bernard, Ted McGinley, Saul Rubinek, Harry Dean Stanton, Demi Moore, Pamela Reed, Michael Richards, Taylor Negron, Titos Vandis, Haunani Minn, Lynne Marie Stewart, Richard Dean Anderson	
J U L Y	23	The Best Little Whorehouse in Texas	Universal Pictures / Miller-Milkis-Boyett Productions / RKO Pictures	Colin Higgins (director/screenplay); Larry L. King, Peter Masterson (screenplay); Burt Reynolds, Dolly Parton, Dom DeLuise, Charles Durning, Theresa Merritt, Jim Nabors, Lois Nettleton, Noah Beery Jr., Robert Mandan, Barry Corbin, Mary Jo Catlett, Mary Louise Wilson, Howard K. Smith, Donald F. Colson, Helen Kleeb, Mickey Jones, Bobby Fite, Paula Shaw, Kenneth White, Ted Gehring, Verne Lundquist, Lee Grosscup, Alice Drummond, Terri Treas, Randy Bennett	
J U L Y	23	The Challenge	Embassy Pictures / CBS Theatrical Films	John Frankenheimer (director); Richard Maxwell, Marc Norman, John Sayles (screenplay); Scott Glenn, Toshirō Mifune, Atsuo Nakamura, Donna Kei Benz, Calvin Jung, Clyde Kusatsu, Sab Shimono, Kiyoaki Nagai, Kenta Fukasaku, Shōgo Shimada, Yoshio Inaba, Seiji Miyaguchi, Miiko Taka, Ryuji Yamashita	
J U L Y	23	The World According to Garp	Warner Bros. / Pan Arts	George Roy Hill (director); Steve Tesich (screenplay); Robin Williams, Mary Beth Hurt, Glenn Close, John Lithgow, Hume Cronyn, Jessica Tandy, Swoosie Kurtz, Peter Michael Goetz, Mark Soper, Warren Berlinger, Brandon Maggart, Amanda Plummer, Jenny Wright, Brenda Currin, John Irving, George Roy Hill	
J U L Y	23	Zapped!	Embassy Pictures	Robert J. Rosenthal (director/screenplay); Bruce Rubin (screenplay); Scott Baio, Willie Aames, Felice Schachter, Heather Thomas, Robert Mandan, Greg Bradford, Scatman Crothers, Sue Ane Langdon, Roger Bowen, Marya Small, Merritt Butrick, Eddie Deezen, LaWanda Page, Corinne Bohrer, Jan Leighton	
J U L Y	30	Forced Vengeance	MGM/UA Entertainment Company	James Fargo (director/screenplay); Franklin Thompson (screenplay); Chuck Norris, Mary Louise Weller, Camila Griggs, Michael Cavanaugh, David Opatoshu, Seiji Sakaguchi, Frank Michael Liu, Bob Minor, Lloyd Kino, Leigh Hamilton, Howard Caine, Robert Emhardt, Roger Behrstock, Jimmy Shaw, Richard Norton	
J U L Y	30	The Last American Virgin	Cannon Film Distributors	Boaz Davidson (director/screenplay); Lawrence Monoson, Diane Franklin, Steve Antin, Joe Rubbo, Louisa Moritz, Kimmy Robertson, Harry Bugin, Brian Peck, Tessa Richarde, Winifred Freedman, Gerri Idol, Phil Rubenstein, Roberto Rodriquez	
J U L Y	30	Night Shift	Warner Bros. / The Ladd Company	Ron Howard (director); Lowell Ganz, Babaloo Mandel (screenplay); Henry Winkler, Michael Keaton, Shelley Long, Gina Hecht, Pat Corley, Bobby Di Cicco, Nita Talbot, Basil Hoffman, Tim Rossovich, Clint Howard, Joe Spinell, Richard Belzer, Grand L. Bush, Charles Fleischer, Vincent Schiavelli, Dawn Dunlap, Kevin Costner, Shannen Doherty, Floyd Levine	
J U L Y	30	Tex	Walt Disney Productions / Buena Vista Distribution	Tim Hunter (director/screenplay); Charles S. Haas (screenplay); Matt Dillon, Jim Metzler, Meg Tilly, Bill McKinney, Ben Johnson, Frances Lee McCain, Emilio Estevez, Tom Virtue, Željko Ivanek, Jack Thibeau, S.E. Hinton, Phil Brock, Pamela Ludwig, Jeff Fleury, Marilyn Redfield, Mark Arnott, Jill Clark, Sheryl Briedel, Lisa Mirkin, Mary Simons, Mike Coats, Charlie Haas, Coralie Hunter	
A U G U S T	4	Things Are Tough All Over	Columbia Pictures	Thomas K. Avildsen (director); Tommy Chong, Cheech Marin (screenplay); Cheech Marin, Tommy Chong, Evelyn Guerrero, John Steadman, George Wallace, Billy Beck, Senta Moses, Aaron Freeman, Ben Powers, Rip Taylor, Dave Coulier, Ruby Wax, Shelby Chong, Toni Attell, Mike Bacarella, Don Bovingloh, Richard "Moon" Calhoun, Jennifer Condos, John Corronna, Mike Friedman, Maya Harman, Vanaghan S. Housepian, Garth Shaw, Rikki Marin	
A U G U S T	6	The Pirate Movie	20th Century Fox / Joseph Hamilton International Productions	Ken Annakin (director); Trevor Farrant (screenplay); Kristy McNichol, Christopher Atkins, Ted Hamilton, Bill Kerr, Garry McDonald, Maggie Kirkpatrick, Rhonda Burchmore, Chuck McKinney, Kate Ferguson, Catherine Lynch	
A U G U S T	13	Fast Times at Ridgemont High	Universal Pictures	Amy Heckerling (director); Cameron Crowe (screenplay); Sean Penn, Jennifer Jason Leigh, Judge Reinhold, Phoebe Cates, Brian Backer, Richard Romanus, Ray Walston, Scott Thomson, Vincent Schiavelli, Amanda Wyss, D.W. Brown, Forest Whitaker, Kelli Maroney, Tom Nolan, Blair Ashleigh, Eric Stoltz, James Russo, Nicolas Cage, Martin Brest, Stu Nahan, Taylor Negron, Pamela Springsteen, Lana Clarkson, Anthony Edwards, Nancy Wilson, Stuart Cornfeld	
A U G U S T	13	Friday the 13th Part III	Paramount Pictures / Jason Inc.	Steve Miner (director); Martin Kitrosser, Carol Watson (screenplay); Dana Kimmell, Paul Kratka, Tracie Savage, Jeffrey Rogers, Catherine Parks, Larry Zerner, Richard Brooker, Steve Susskind, David Katims, Rachel Howard, Nick Savage, Gloria Charles, Kevin O'Brien, Cheri Maugans, Perla Walter, David Wiley	
A U G U S T	13	An Officer and a Gentleman	Paramount Pictures / Lorimar Productions	Taylor Hackford (director); Douglas Day Stewart (screenplay); Richard Gere, Debra Winger, David Keith, Louis Gossett Jr., Robert Loggia, Lisa Blount, Lisa Eilbacher, Tony Plana, Harold Sylvester, David Caruso, Victor French, Grace Zabriskie, Tommy Petersen, Elizabeth Rogers, John Laughlin, Ed Begley Jr.	
A U G U S T	13	Tempest	Columbia Pictures	Paul Mazursky (director/screenplay); Leon Capetanos (screenplay); John Cassavetes, Gena Rowlands, Susan Sarandon, Vittorio Gassman, Raúl Juliá, Molly Ringwald, Sam Robards, Paul Stewart, Jackie Gayle, Anthony Holland, Jerry Hardin, Paul Mazursky, Cookie Mueller, Lucianne Buchanan	
A U G U S T	20	The Beastmaster	MGM/UA Entertainment Co.	Don Coscarelli (director/screenplay); Paul Pepperman (screenplay); Marc Singer, Tanya Roberts, Rip Torn, John Amos, Josh Milrad, Rod Loomis, Vanna Bonta, Ben Hammer, Ralph Strait, Tony Epper, Paul Reynolds, Billy Jacoby, Donald Battee	
A U G U S T	20	Class of 1984	United Film Distribution Company / Guerrilla High Productions	Mark L. Lester (director/screenplay); Tom Holland, John Saxton (screenplay); Perry King, Merrie Lynn Ross, Timothy Van Patten, Lisa Langlois, Stefan Arngrim, Michael Fox, Roddy McDowall, Keith Knight, Neil Clifford, Al Waxman, Linda Sorenson, Teenage Head, Erin Flannery, David Gardner	
A U G U S T	28	The Junkman	H.B. Halicki Junkyard and Mercantile Company	H.B. Halicki (director/screenplay); H.B. Halicki, Christopher Stone, Susan Shaw, Lang Jeffries, Hoyt Axton, Dan Grimaldi, Lynda Day George, Kopi Sotiropulos, Jewel Shepard, Bruce Cameron, Jack Vacek, Richard L. Muse, Kelly Busia, Dennis Stouffer, Brian LaBonge, Judi Gibbs, Tony Ostermeier, Dave Logue, Rita Rickard, Mike Brennan, John Halicki, Ronald Halicki, Maureen Coddington, Butch Stockton, Phil Boroff	
A U G U S T	28	Querelle	Gaumont	Rainer Werner Fassbinder (director/screenplay); Burkhard Driest (screenplay); Brad Davis, Franco Nero, Jeanne Moreau, Laurent Malet, Hanno Pöschl, Günther Kaufmann, Burkhard Driest, Roger Fritz, Dieter Schidor, Natja Brunckhorst, Werner Asam, Axel Bauer, Neil Bell, Robert van Ackeren, Wolf Gremm, Frank Ripploh	
S E P T E M B E R	3	The Concrete Jungle	Motion Picture Marketing	Tom DeSimone (director); Alan J. Adler (screenplay); Jill St. John, Tracey E. Bregman, Barbara Luna, Sondra Currie, Peter Brown, Camille Keaton, Sean O'Kane, June Barrett, Aimée Eccles	
S E P T E M B E R	10	Endangered Species	MGM/UA Entertainment Co.	Alan Rudolph (director/screenplay); John Binder, Judson Klinger, Richard Clayton Woods (screenplay); Robert Urich, JoBeth Williams, Paul Dooley, Hoyt Axton, Peter Coyote, Marin Kanter, Gailard Sartain, Dan Hedaya, Harry Carey Jr., John Considine	
S E P T E M B E R	11	Starstruck	Australian Film Commission / Palm Beach Pictures	Gillian Armstrong (director); Stephen MacLean (screenplay); Jo Kennedy, Ross O'Donovan, Margo Lee, Max Cullen, Pat Evison, John O'May, Dennis Miller, Norm Erskine, Melissa Jaffer, Ned Lander, Mark Little	
S E P T E M B E R	17	Hammett	Orion Pictures / Zoetrope Studios	Wim Wenders (director); Ross Thomas, Dennis O'Flaherty (screenplay); Frederic Forrest, Peter Boyle, Marilu Henner, Roy Kinnear, Elisha Cook, Jr., R.G. Armstrong, Richard Bradford, Michael Chow, David Patrick Kelly, Sylvia Sidney, Jack Nance, Royal Dano, Samuel Fuller, Fox Harris, Lydia Lei, Elmer Kline	
S E P T E M B E R	17	Inchon	MGM/UA Entertainment Co. / One-Way Productions / News World Communications	Terence Young (director); Laird Koenig, Robin Moore (screenplay); Laurence Olivier, Jacqueline Bisset, Ben Gazzara, Toshiro Mifune, Richard Roundtree	
S E P T E M B E R	17	Pink Floyd – The Wall	MGM/UA Entertainment Co. / Tin Blue Productions / Goldcrest Films International	Alan Parker, Gerald Scarfe (directors); Roger Waters (screenplay); Bob Geldof, Christine Hargreaves, Eleanor David, Alex McAvoy, Bob Hoskins, Michael Ensign, James Laurenson, Jenny Wright, Margery Mason, James Hazeldine, Joanne Whalley, Nell Campbell, Philip Davis, Gary Olsen, Ellis Dale, Ray Mort, Robert Bridges, Emma Longfellow, Lorna Barton, Kevin McKeon, David Bingham	
S E P T E M B E R	24	Amityville II: The Possession	Orion Pictures / Dino De Laurentiis Corporation / Giada International	Damiano Damiani (director); Tommy Lee Wallace, Dardano Sacchetti (screenplay); James Olson, Burt Young, Rutanya Alda, Jack Magner, Diane Franklin, Moses Gunn, Andrew Prine, Leonardo Cimino, Ted Ross, Brent Katz, Erika Katz, Petra Lea, Martin Donegan	
S E P T E M B E R	24	Yes, Giorgio	MGM/UA Entertainment Company	Franklin J. Schaffner (director); Norman Steinberg (screenplay); Luciano Pavarotti, Kathryn Harrold, Eddie Albert, Paola Borboni, James Hong, Joe Mascolo, Karen Kondazian, Leona Mitchell, Kurt Herbert Adler, Emerson Buckley, Alexander Courage, Beulah Quo, Norman Steinberg, Rod Colbin, Kathryn Fuller	
S E P T E M B E R	25	The Facts of Life Goes to Paris	NBC / Sony Pictures Television / Embassy Television	Asaad Kelada (director); Jerry Mayer, Jack Elinson, Linda Marsh, Maggie Peters, Deidre Fay, Stuart Wolpert (screenplay); Charlotte Rae, Lisa Whelchel, Kim Fields, Mindy Cohn, Nancy McKeon, Frank Bonner, Roger Til, Laurie Main, Frédéric Andrei, Jacques Ferrière, Vivian Brown, Caroline Ducrocq, Bernard Soufflet	
S E P T E M B E R	28	Hot Lead and Cold Feet (re-release)	Walt Disney Productions / Buena Vista Distribution	Robert Butler (director); Joe McEveety, Arthur Alsberg, Don Nelson (screenplay); Jim Dale, Karen Valentine, Don Knotts, Darren McGavin, Jack Elam, Dallas McKennon, John Williams, Warren Vanders, Michael Sharrett, Don "Red" Barry, Gregg Palmer, Ed Bakey, John Steadman, Eric Server, Paul Lukather, Stanley Clements, Don Brodie, Jack Bender, Debbie Lytton, David Cass, Richard Wright, Jimmy Van Patten, James Michaelford	
S E P T E M B E R	28	The Shadow Riders	Sony Pictures Television / CBS Entertainment Production / Columbia Pictures Television / The Pegasus Group	Andrew V. McLaglen (director); Jim Byrnes (screenplay); Tom Selleck, Sam Elliott, Dominique Dunne, Katharine Ross, Ben Johnson, Geoffrey Lewis, Jeff Osterhage, Gene Evans, R.G. Armstrong, Marshall R. Teague, Jane Greer, Harry Carey, Jr., Jeannetta Arnette, Ben Fuhrman, Natalie May, Owen Orr, Kristina David, Joe Capone, Robert B. Craig, Scanlon Gail	

== October–December ==
Opening		Title	Production company	Cast and crew	Ref.
O C T O B E R	1	Hey Good Lookin'	Warner Bros. / Bakshi Productions	Ralph Bakshi (director/screenplay); Richard Romanus, David Proval, Jesse Welles, Tina Bowman, Philip M. Thomas, Frank DeKova, Candy Candido, Angelo Grisanti	
O C T O B E R	1	My Favorite Year	MGM/UA Entertainment Co. / Brooksfilms Ltd.	Richard Benjamin (director); Norman Steinberg, Dennis Palumbo (screenplay); Peter O'Toole, Mark Linn-Baker, Jessica Harper, Joseph Bologna, Bill Macy, Lainie Kazan, Anne De Salvo, Basil Hoffman, Lou Jacobi, Adolph Green, Tony DiBenedetto, George Wyner, Selma Diamond, Katie McClain, Cameron Mitchell, Lana Clarkson, Gloria Stuart	
O C T O B E R	2	The Draughtsman's Contract	Curzon Artificial Eye / British Film Institute / Channel 4	Peter Greenaway (director/screenplay); Anthony Higgins, Janet Suzman, Dave Hill, Anne-Louise Lambert, Hugh Fraser, Neil Cunningham, David Meyer, Tony Meyer, Nicholas Amer, Suzan Crowley, Lynda La Plante, Michael Feast, David Gant, Alastair Cumming, Steve Ubels	
O C T O B E R	3	Split Image	Orion Pictures / PolyGram Pictures	Ted Kotcheff (director); Robert Mark Kamen, Robert Kaufman (screenplay); Michael O'Keefe, Karen Allen, Peter Fonda, James Woods, Elizabeth Ashley, Brian Dennehy, Ronnie Scribner, Pamela Ludwig, John Dukakis, Lee Montgomery, Michael Sacks, Deborah Rush, Peter Horton, Ken Farmer, Cliff Stephens, Brian Henson, David Wallace, Herbert Kirkpatrick, Irma P. Hall, Bill Engvall, Kenneth Barry, Robert A. Cowan, Chris McCarty, Lee Ritchey, Lynette Walden, Robert Hibbard, Scott Campbell, Melanie Strange, Dave Tanner, Tom Rayhall, Jeanne Evans, Peter Hans Sprague, John Carroll, Haley McLane, Kelly Wimberly	
O C T O B E R	15	Love Child	Warner Bros. / The Ladd Company	Larry Peerce (director); Paul Maslansky (screenplay); Amy Madigan, Beau Bridges, Mackenzie Phillips, Albert Salmi, Joanna Merlin, Margaret Whitton	
O C T O B E R	16	Android	New World Pictures	Aaron Lipstadt (director); James Reigle, Don Keith Opper, Will Reigle (screenplay); Klaus Kinski, Brie Howard, Don Keith Opper, Norbert Weisser, Darrell Larson, Rachel Talalay, Kendra Kirchner, Crofton Hardester, Randy Connor, Gary Corarito, Mary Ann Fisher, Julia Gibson, Roger Kelton, Ian Scheibel, Wayne Springfield, Johanne Todd	
O C T O B E R	21	The Plague Dogs	Embassy Pictures / United Artists / Nepenthe Productions / Goldcrest Films	Martin Rosen (director/screenplay); John Hurt, Christopher Benjamin, James Bolam, Nigel Hawthorne, Warren Mitchell, Bernard Hepton, Brian Stirner, Penelope Lee, Geoffrey Matthews, Barbara Leigh-Hunt, John Bennett, John Franklyn-Robbins, Bill Maynard, Malcolm Terris, Judy Geeson, Philip Locke, Brian Spink, Tony Church, Anthony Valentine, William Lucas, Dandy Nichols, Rosemary Leach, Patrick Stewart, Percy Edwards	
O C T O B E R	22	First Blood	Orion Pictures / Anabasis Investments, N.V.	Ted Kotcheff (director); Michael Kozoll, William Sackheim, Sylvester Stallone (screenplay); Sylvester Stallone, Richard Crenna, Brian Dennehy, Bill McKinney, Jack Starrett, Michael Talbott, Chris Mulkey, John McLiam, Alf Humphreys, David Caruso, David L. Crowley, Don MacKay, Patrick Stark	
O C T O B E R	22	Halloween III: Season of the Witch	Universal Pictures / Dino De Laurentiis Corporation / Debra Hill Productions	Tommy Lee Wallace (director/screenplay); Tom Atkins, Stacey Nelkin, Dan O'Herlihy, Michael Currie, Ralph Strait, Garn Stephens, Nancy Kyes, Jonathan Terry, Maidie Norman, Paddi Edwards, Joshua John Miller, Dick Warlock, Nick Castle, Jamie Lee Curtis, Jadeen Barbor, Brad Schacter, Al Berry, Wendy Wessberg, Essex Smith, Michelle Walker	
O C T O B E R	22	Jinxed!	United Artists / Herb Jaffe Productions	Don Siegel (director); Frank D. Gilroy (screenplay); Bette Midler, Ken Wahl, Rip Torn, Val Avery, Jack Elam, Benson Fong, Jacqueline Scott, F. William Parker, Ian Wolfe, George Dickerson, Kathryn Kates, Kathleen O'Malley, Woodrow Parfrey, Joan Freeman, Don Siegel, Barry Michlin, Read Morgan, Jim Nolan, Tom Pletts, Archie Lang	
O C T O B E R	22	Monsignor	20th Century Fox	Frank Perry (director); Abraham Polonsky, Wendell Mayes (screenplay); Christopher Reeve, Geneviève Bujold, Fernando Rey, Jason Miller, Joe Cortese, Adolfo Celi, Tomas Milian, Leonardo Cimino, Robert Prosky, Joe Pantoliano, Milena Vukotic, Joe Spinell, Ettore Mattia, Gregory Snegoff, Pamela Prati, Darin Berry	
O C T O B E R	22	The Sender	Paramount Pictures / Kingsmere Productions Ltd.	Roger Christian (director); Thomas Baum (screenplay); Kathryn Harrold, Željko Ivanek, Shirley Knight, Paul Freeman, Al Matthews, Marsha Hunt, Angus MacInnes, John Stephen Hill, Mary Ellen Ray, Sean Hewitt, Harry Ditson, Olivier Pierre, Jana Shelden, Tracy Harper, Monica Buford	
O C T O B E R	29	It Came from Hollywood	Paramount Pictures	Malcolm Leo, Andrew Solt (directors); Dana Olsen (screenplay); Dan Aykroyd, John Candy, Cheech Marin, Tommy Chong, Gilda Radner, Archive footage of Bela Lugosi, Mamie Van Doren	
O C T O B E R	29	Class Reunion	20th Century Fox / ABC Motion Pictures	Michael Miller (director); John Hughes (screenplay); Gerrit Graham, Fred McCarren, Miriam Flynn, Stephen Furst, Shelley Smith, Michael Lerner, Chuck Berry, Misty Rowe, Blackie Dammett, Mews Small, Zane Buzby, Jim Staahl, Jacklyn Zeman, Barry Diamond, Art Evans, Marla Pennington, Randy Powell, Anne Ramsey, John Hughes	
O C T O B E R	29	Q	United Film Distribution Company	Larry Cohen (director/screenplay); Michael Moriarty, Candy Clark, David Carradine, Richard Roundtree, Malachy McCourt, Fred J. Scollay, Ron Cey, Mary Louise Weller, John Capodice, James Dixon, Peter Hock, Tony Page, Shelly Desai, Lee Louis	
N O V E M B E R	5	Fast-Walking	Pickman Films / Lorimar Productions	James B. Harris (director/screenplay); Ernest Brawley (screenplay); James Woods, Tim McIntire, Kay Lenz, Robert Hooks, Charles Weldon, M. Emmet Walsh, Susan Tyrrell, John Friedrich, Lance LeGault, Timothy Carey, Sydney Lassick, Helen Page Camp, K Callan	
N O V E M B E R	5	The Man from Snowy River	20th Century Fox	George T. Miller (director); John Dixon (screenplay); Kirk Douglas, Jack Thompson, Tom Burlinson, Sigrid Thornton, Lorraine Bayly, Terence Donovan, Tommy Dysart, Tony Bonner, June Jago, Chris Haywood, Gus Mercurio, Bruce Kerr, David Bradshaw, Kristopher Steele, Howard Eynon	
N O V E M B E R	5	Piranha II: The Spawning	Saturn International Pictures / Brouwersgracht Investments / Chako Film Company	James Cameron, Ovidio G. Assonitis (directors); Charles H. Eglee (screenplay); Tricia O'Neil, Lance Henriksen, Steve Marachuk, Ted Richert, Ricky G. Paull, Leslie Graves, Carole Davis, Carolyn De Fonseca, Albert Sanders, Tracy Berg, Phil Colby, Hildy Maganasun, Connie Lynn Hadden, Anne Pollack, Arnie Ross, Lee Krug, Sally Ricca, Phil Mullins, Kidd Brewer Jr., Jan Eisner Mannon, Ancil Gloudon, Paul Drummond, Stevie Cox	
N O V E M B E R	9	The Scarlet Pimpernel	CBS / London Films	Clive Donner (director); William Bast (screenplay); Anthony Andrews, Jane Seymour, Ian McKellen, James Villiers, Eleanor David, Malcolm Jamieson, Richard Morant, Dominic Jephcott, Christopher Villiers, Denis Lill, Ann Firbank, Tracey Childs, Julian Fellowes, Mark Drewry, John Quarmby, David Gant, Geoffrey Toone, Joanna Dickens, Richard Charles, Gordon Gostelow, Carol MacReady, Daphne Anderson, Nick Brimble, Tony Caunter, Timothy Carlton, Kate Howard	
N O V E M B E R	10	Creepshow	Warner Bros. / United Film Distribution Company / Laurel Show, Inc.	George A. Romero (director); Stephen King (screenplay); Hal Holbrook, Adrienne Barbeau, Fritz Weaver, Leslie Nielsen, Carrie Nye, E.G. Marshall, Viveca Lindfors, Joe King, Tom Atkins, Jon Lormer, Ed Harris, John Amplas, Stephen King, Gaylen Ross, Ted Danson, Don Keefer, Robert Harper, David Garrison, David Early, Tom Savini, Iva Jean Saraceni, Elizabeth Regan, Warner Shook, Peter Messer, Nann Mogg, Bingo O'Malley, Chuck Aber, Christine Forrest, Darryl Ferrucci, Ann Muffly, Mark Tierno, Marty Schiff	
N O V E M B E R	12	Alone in the Dark	New Line Cinema / Masada Productions	Jack Sholder (director/screenplay); Robert Shaye, Michael Harrpster (screenplay); Jack Palance, Donald Pleasence, Martin Landau, Erland Van Lidth, Dwight Schultz, Brent Jennings, Frederick Coffin, Annie Korzen, Lin Shaye, Deborah Hedwall, Lee Taylor-Allan, Phillip Clark, Elizabeth Ward, Carol Levy, Keith Reddin, Gordon Watkins	
N O V E M B E R	12	Come Back to the 5 & Dime, Jimmy Dean, Jimmy Dean	Cinecom International Films / Mark Goodson Productions / Viacom Enterprises / Sandcastle 5	Robert Altman (director); Ed Graczyk (screenplay); Sandy Dennis, Cher, Karen Black, Sudie Bond, Marta Heflin, Kathy Bates, Mark Patton, Caroline Aaron, Ann Risley, Ruth Miller, Gena Ramsel, Dianne Turley Travis	
N O V E M B E R	12	Five Days One Summer	Warner Bros. Pictures / The Ladd Company	Fred Zinnemann (director); Michael Austin (screenplay); Sean Connery, Betsy Brantley, Lambert Wilson, Jennifer Hilary, Isabel Dean, Gérard Buhr, Anna Massey, Sheila Reid	
N O V E M B E R	12	Jimmy the Kid	New World Pictures / Zephyr Productions	Gary Nelson (director); Sam Bobrick (screenplay); Gary Coleman, Paul Le Mat, Ruth Gordon, Dee Wallace, Cleavon Little, Don Adams, Pat Morita, Fay Hauser, Avery Schreiber, Walter Olkewicz	
N O V E M B E R	12	The Slumber Party Massacre	New World Pictures / Santa Fe Productions	Amy Holden Jones (director); Rita Mae Brown (screenplay); Michelle Michaels, Robin Stille, Brinke Stevens, Michael Villella, Debra Deliso, Andree Honore, Gina Mari, Jennifer Meyers, Joseph Alan Johnson, David Millbern, Jim Boyce, Pamela Roylance, Rigg Kennedy, Jean Vargas, Howard Purgason, Anna Patton	
N O V E M B E R	12	They Call Me Bruce?	Film Ventures International	Elliott Hong (director); David B. Randolph (screenplay); Johnny Yune, Margaux Hemingway, Bill Capizzi, Raf Mauro, Pam Huntington, Martin Azarow, Tony Brande, René Levant	
N O V E M B E R	12	White Dog	Paramount Pictures	Samuel Fuller (director/screenplay); Curtis Hanson (screenplay); Kristy McNichol, Paul Winfield, Burl Ives, Jameson Parker, Parley Baer	
N O V E M B E R	19	Bugs Bunny's 3rd Movie: 1001 Rabbit Tales	Warner Bros.	Friz Freleng (director/screenplay); Chuck Jones, Robert McKimson (directors); Warren Foster, Michael Maltese, Tedd Pierce (screenplay); Mel Blanc, Bea Benaderet, Arthur Q. Bryan, June Foray, Shepard Menken, Lennie Weinrib, Tom Holland	
N O V E M B E R	19	Heidi's Song	Paramount Pictures / Hanna-Barbera Productions	Robert Taylor (director/screenplay); Joseph Barbera, Jameson Brewer (screenplay); Lorne Greene, Sammy Davis Jr., Margery Gray, Michael Bell, Peter Cullen, Roger DeWitt, Richard Erdman, Fritz Feld, Pamelyn Ferdin, Joan Gerber, Virginia Gregg, Janet Waldo, Frank Welker, Michael Winslow	
N O V E M B E R	19	The Last Unicorn	Jensen Farley Pictures / Rankin/Bass Productions / ITC Entertainment / Topcraft	Arthur Rankin Jr., Jules Bass (directors); Peter S. Beagle (screenplay); Alan Arkin, Jeff Bridges, Mia Farrow, Tammy Grimes, Robert Klein, Angela Lansbury, Christopher Lee, Keenan Wynn, Paul Frees, René Auberjonois, Don Messick, Nellie Bellflower, Brother Theodore, Edward Peck, Kenneth Jennings, Jack Lester	
N O V E M B E R	19	Still of the Night	United Artists / MGM/UA Entertainment Co.	Robert Benton (director/screenplay); Roy Scheider, Meryl Streep, Jessica Tandy, Joe Grifasi, Sara Botsford, Josef Sommer, Rikke Borge, Irving Metzman, Larry Joshua, Tom Norton, Richmond Hoxie, Hyon Cho, Danielle Cusson, John Eric Bentley, George A. Tooks	
N O V E M B E R	28	The Executioner's Song	NBC / Film Communications Inc.	Lawrence Schiller (director); Norman Mailer (screenplay); Tommy Lee Jones, Christine Lahti, Rosanna Arquette, Eli Wallach, Steven Keats, Jordan Clarke, Richard Venture, Jenny Wright, Walter Olkewicz, Pat Corley, John Dennis Johnston, Rance Howard, Charles Cyphers, Jim Youngs, Grace Zabriskie, Michael LeClair, Mary Ethel Gregory, Norris Mailer, Kenneth O'Brien, Robert DeMotte	
D E C E M B E R	3	Frances	Universal Pictures / Associated Film Distribution / EMI Films / Brooksfilms	Graeme Clifford (director); Eric Bergren, Christopher De Vore, Nicholas Kazan (screenplay); Jessica Lange, Kim Stanley, Sam Shepard, Bart Burns, Jonathan Banks, Jeffrey DeMunn, Zelda Rubinstein, Anjelica Huston, Pamela Gordon, Rick May, Kevin Costner	
D E C E M B E R	8	48 Hrs.	Paramount Pictures / Lawrence Gordon Productions	Walter Hill (director/screenplay); Roger Spottiswoode, Larry Gross, Steven E. de Souza (screenplay); Nick Nolte, Eddie Murphy, James Remar, David Patrick Kelly, Sonny Landham, Brion James, Annette O'Toole, Frank McRae, Kerry Sherman, Jonathan Banks, Margot Rose, Denise Crosby, Olivia Brown, Peter Jason, John Dennis Johnston, Clare Nono, James Keane	
D E C E M B E R	8	Gandhi	Columbia Pictures / Goldcrest Films / International Film Investors / National Film Development Corporation of India / Indo-British Films	Richard Attenborough (director); John Briley (screenplay); Ben Kingsley, Candice Bergen, Edward Fox, John Gielgud, Trevor Howard, John Mills, Martin Sheen, Rohini Hattangadi, Roshan Seth, Pradeep Kumar, Saeed Jaffrey, Virendra Razdan, Habib Tanvir, Shane Rimmer, Ian Charleson, Athol Fugard, Geraldine James, Alyque Padamsee, Amrish Puri, Ian Bannen, Richard Griffiths, Nigel Hawthorne, Richard Vernon, Michael Hordern, Shreeram Lagoo, Terrence Hardiman, Om Puri, Dalip Tahil, Bernard Hill, Daniel Day-Lewis, John Ratzenberger, Pankaj Mohan, Pankaj Kapur, Anang Desai, Supriya Pathak, Neena Gupta, Tom Alter, Alok Nath, Mohan Agashe, Sekhar Chatterjee, Harsh Nayyar, Dilsher Singh, Gunther Maria Halmer, Peter Harlowe	
D E C E M B E R	8	The Verdict	20th Century Fox	Sidney Lumet (director); David Mamet (screenplay); Paul Newman, Charlotte Rampling, Jack Warden, James Mason, Milo O'Shea, Lindsay Crouse, Edward Binns, Julie Bovasso, Roxanne Hart, James Handy, Wesley Addy, Joe Seneca, Lewis J. Stadlen, Kent Broadhurst, Colin Stinton, Tobin Bell, Bruce Willis	
D E C E M B E R	10	Airplane II: The Sequel	Paramount Pictures	Ken Finkleman (director/screenplay); Robert Hays, Julie Hagerty, Lloyd Bridges, Chad Everett, Peter Graves, Rip Torn, John Dehner, Chuck Connors, Richard Jaeckel, Stephen Stucker, Kent McCord, James A. Watson Jr., Wendy Phillips, Laurene Landon, Sonny Bono, William Shatner, Raymond Burr, John Vernon, James Noble, Jack Jones, John Larch, Lee Bryant, John Hancock, Oliver Robins, Louis Giambalvo, David Paymer, Rick Overton, Sam Anderson, Leon Askin, Art Fleming, Frank Ashmore, Pat Sajak, Louise Sorel, Sandahl Bergman, Burke Byrnes, Michael Currie, Bruce French, Richard Gilliland, Hugh Gillin, David Leisure, Gail Matthius, Lee Patterson, Hervé Villechaize, Lee Purcell, Earl Boen, Joyce DeWitt, Cindy Fisher, Monique Gabrielle, Kitten Natividad, John Paragon, George Wendt	
D E C E M B E R	10	Mighty Mouse in the Great Space Chase	Children's Video Library / Filmation Associates / Miracle / CBS Television Distribution / Viacom Productions	Ed Friedman, Lou Kachivas, Marsh Lamore, Gwen Wetzler, Kay Wright, Lou Zukor (directors); Lou Scheimer, Alan Oppenheimer, Diane Pershing	
D E C E M B E R	10	Sophie's Choice	Universal Pictures / Associated Film Distribution / ITC Entertainment / Keith Barish Productions	Alan J. Pakula (director/screenplay); Meryl Streep, Kevin Kline, Peter MacNicol, Rita Karin, Stephen D. Newman, Josh Mostel, Robin Bartlett, Eugene Lipinski, John Rothman, Katharina Thalbach, David Wohl, Nina Polan, Vida Jerman, Josef Sommer, Karlheinz Hackl, Marcell Rosenblatt, Moishe Rosenfeld, Neddim Prohic, Jennifer Lawn, Adrian Kalitka, Joseph Leon, Günther Maria Halmer	
D E C E M B E R	10	The Toy	Columbia Pictures / Rastar	Richard Donner (director); Carol Sobieski, Francis Veber (screenplay); Richard Pryor, Jackie Gleason, Scott Schwartz, Ned Beatty, Teresa Ganzel, Wilfrid Hyde-White, Annazette Chase, Tony King, Virginia Capers	
D E C E M B E R	11	Timerider: The Adventure of Lyle Swann	Jensen Farley Pictures / Zoomo Production	William Dear (director/screenplay); Michael Nesmith (screenplay); Fred Ward, Peter Coyote, Belinda Bauer, Ed Lauter, Tracey Walter, L.Q. Jones, Richard Masur, Chris Mulkey, Macon McCalman, Michael Nesmith	
D E C E M B E R	15	Honkytonk Man	Warner Bros. / The Malpaso Company	Clint Eastwood (director); Clancy Carlile (screenplay); Clint Eastwood, Kyle Eastwood, John McIntire, Alexa Kenin, Verna Bloom, Matt Clark, Barry Corbin, Jerry Hardin, Tim Thomerson, Macon McCalman, Joe Regalbuto, Gary Grubbs, Marty Robbins, Tracey Walter	
D E C E M B E R	16	The Grey Fox	United Artists Classics / Zoetrope Studios	Phillip Borsos (director); John Hunter (screenplay); Richard Farnsworth, Jackie Burroughs, Wayne Robson, Ken Pogue, Timothy Webber, Gary Reineke, Sean Sullivan	
D E C E M B E R	16	The Year of Living Dangerously	MGM/UA Entertainment Company / Freddie Fields Productions / McElroy and McElroy	Peter Weir (director/screenplay); David Williamson, C.J. Koch (screenplay); Mel Gibson, Sigourney Weaver, Bill Kerr, Michael Murphy, Linda Hunt, Noel Ferrier, Bembol Roco, Paul Sonkkila, Kuh Ledesma, Ali Nur, Dominador Robridillo, Joel Agona, Mike Emperio, Bernardo Nacilla, Domingo Landicho, Hermino De Guzman	
D E C E M B E R	17	Best Friends	Warner Bros. / Timberlane Productions	Norman Jewison (director); Valerie Curtin, Barry Levinson (screenplay); Burt Reynolds, Goldie Hawn, Ron Silver, Jessica Tandy, Barnard Hughes, Audra Lindley, Keenan Wynn, Carol Locatell, Noah Hathaway, Richard Libertini, Valerie Curtin	
D E C E M B E R	17	The Dark Crystal	Universal Pictures / Associated Film Distribution / Henson Associates / ITC Entertainment	Jim Henson, Frank Oz (directors); David Odell (screenplay); Stephen Garlick, Lisa Maxwell, Billie Whitelaw, Percy Edwards, Barry Dennen, Michael Kilgarriff, Jerry Nelson, Steve Whitmire, Thick Nelson, Brian Muehl, John Baddeley, David Buck, Charles Collingwood, Sean Barrett, Toby Philpott, Joseph O'Conor, David Greenaway, Jean Pierre Amiel, Hugh Spight, Robbie Barnett, Swee Lim, Simon Williamson, Hus Levant, Miki Iveria, Patrick Monckton, Sue Weatherby	
D E C E M B E R	17	Harry Tracy, Desperado	Astral Films	William A. Graham (director); David Lee Henry, R. Lance Hill (screenplay); Bruce Dern, Gordon Lightfoot, Helen Shaver, Michael C. Gwynne	
D E C E M B E R	17	Peter Pan (re-release)	Walt Disney Productions / RKO Radio Pictures	Clyde Geronimi, Wilfred Jackson, Hamilton Luske (directors); Milt Banta, Bill Cottrell, Winston Hibler, Bill Peet, Erdman Penner, Joe Rinaldi, Ted Sears, Ralph Wright (screenplay); Bobby Driscoll, Kathryn Beaumont, Hans Conried, Bill Thompson, Heather Angel, Paul Collins, Tommy Luske, Candy Candido, Tom Conway, Roland Dupree, Don Barclay, Lucille Bliss, Stuffy Singer, Johnny McGovern, Robert Ellis, June Foray, Margaret Kerry, Jeffrey Silver, Connie Hilton, Karen Kester	
D E C E M B E R	17	Six Weeks	Universal Pictures / PolyGram Filmed Entertainment	Tony Bill (director); David Seltzer (screenplay); Dudley Moore, Mary Tyler Moore, Katherine Healy, Shannon Wilcox	
D E C E M B E R	17	Tootsie	Columbia Pictures / Mirage Enterprises	Sydney Pollack (director); Larry Gelbart, Murray Schisgal (screenplay); Dustin Hoffman, Jessica Lange, Teri Garr, Dabney Coleman, Charles Durning, Doris Belack, Bill Murray, Sydney Pollack, George Gaynes, Geena Davis, Lynne Thigpen, Ellen Foley, Christine Ebersole, Anne Shropshire, Amy Lawrence, Susan Egbert	
D E C E M B E R	17	Trail of the Pink Panther	United Artists / MGM/UA Entertainment Company / Blake Edwards Entertainment	Blake Edwards (director/screenplay); Frank Waldman, Tom Waldman, Geoffrey Edwards (screenplay); Peter Sellers (died 1980), David Niven, Herbert Lom, Richard Mulligan, Joanna Lumley, Capucine, Robert Loggia, Harvey Korman, Burt Kwouk, André Maranne, Graham Stark, Ronald Fraser, Colin Blakely, Peter Arne, Harold Kasket, Daniel Peacock, Denise Crosby, Leonard Rossiter, Dudley Sutton, Marne Maitland, Liz Smith, Harold Berens, Claire Davenport, Robert Wagner, Claudia Cardinale, Colin Gordon, Lucca Mezzofanti	
D E C E M B E R	22	Kiss Me Goodbye	20th Century Fox	Robert Mulligan (director); Charlie Peters (screenplay); Sally Field, James Caan, Jeff Bridges, Paul Dooley, Claire Trevor, Stephen Elliott, Michael Ensign, Mildred Natwick, William Prince, Maryedith Burrell, Dorothy Fielding, Alan Haufrect	

== See also ==
- List of 1982 box office number-one films in the United States
- 1982 in the United States
