= Mae West (film) =

- Genre: Biography; Drama
- Written by: E. Arthur Kean
- Directed by: Lee Philips
- Starring: Ann Jillian; James Brolin; Piper Laurie; Roddy McDowall
- Theme music composer: Brad Fiedel
- Country of origin: United States
- Original language: English

Production
- Executive producers: Leonard Hill; Philip Mandelker
- Producer: Terry Morse Jr.
- Cinematography: Matthew F. Leonetti
- Editor: George Jay Nicholson
- Running time: 95 minutes
- Production company: Hill/Mandelker Films

Original release
- Network: ABC
- Release: May 2, 1982

Mae West (also known as The Mae West Story) is a 1982 television film about the life of the comedian actress and writer Mae West. It was directed by Lee Philips, starring Ann Jillian as West and featuring James Brolin, Piper Laurie, and Roddy McDowall in supporting roles.

== Release and reception ==
The film originally aired on ABC on May 2, 1982, and was the third most-viewed prime time television program in the United States for the week of April 26–May 2, 1982. In 2010s, it was released digitally on platforms like Amazon Freevee and Google Play Movies. It was filmed on theater grade movie stock, which allowed Multicom Entertainment to perform a 4K restoration of the film in 2010. This is the version available on Freevee and Google.

At the 34th Primetime Emmy Awards, the film received four nominations: Outstanding Lead Actress in a Limited Series or a Special for Ann Jillian, Outstanding Directing in a Limited Series or a Special for Lee Philips, Outstanding Costume Design for a Special for Jean-Pierre Dorléac, and Outstanding Achievement in Makeup for Richard Blair. Jillian was also nominated to a Golden Globe for Best Actress in a Miniseries or Motion Picture Made for Television.

In a retrospective review, AllMovie rated the film 2.5 out of 5 stars.

== Cast ==
- Ann Jillian as Mae West
  - Bridgette Andersen as Mae West (age 7)
- James Brolin as Jim Timony
- Piper Laurie as Matilda West
- Roddy McDowall as Rene Valentine
- Louis Giambalvo as George Kane
- Chuck McCann as W. C. Fields
- Lee de Broux as Jack West
- Donald Hotton as Edward Eisner
- Ian Wolfe as Dorset
- Bill Morey as Al Kaufman
- Rita Taggart as Sally
- Michael Currie as Bill Le Baron
- Jay Garner as Archie Mayo
- Burke Byrnes as Withers
- Martin Azarow as Detective
