= Robin Ignico =

American former child actress

- Born: August 20, 1970 (age 56); Clearwater, Florida, U.S.
- Occupation: Actress
- Years active: 1981-1987; 2015

Robin Ignico (born August 20, 1970) is an American former child actress. She is best known for playing the role of Duffy in the movie Annie.

== Early life ==
Robin Ignico grew up in Clearwater, Florida. She started singing and dancing as a small child, making her first TV appearance on Simon & Simon in 1981.

== Acting career ==
Ignico made several TV and film appearances from 1981 to current, including performances in the TV show Seven Brides for Seven Brothers, as well as the series Voyagers!. Ignico, Aileen Quinn and Angela Lee were the final three girls up for the role of Annie, in the 1982 film. Quinn eventually won the role, while Robin was given the part of Duffy. She is still in show business, and works in real estate as a property manager for notorious slumlord Daniel Ohebshalom.

== Filmography ==
Year	Title	Role	Notes
2015	No Solicitors	Burglar	
1986	News at Eleven	Juliet	TV movie
1984	The Woman in Red	Becky Pierce	
1984	Matt Houston	Amy	1 episode
1984	The Bikini Murders	Amy	1 episode
1983-1985	Trapper John, M.D.	Andrea Branscusi	TV series
1982	Seven Brides for Seven Brothers	Kate	1 episode
1982	Don't Go to Sleep	Mary	TV movie
1982	Voyagers!	Calpurnia	1 episode
1982	Annie	Duffy	
1982	Cry for the Strangers	Missy Palmer	TV movie
1981	Simon & Simon	Irene	1 episode

=== Soundtrack ===
- Annie (1982) soundtrack album: "It's The Hard-Knock Life", "Sandy", "Maybe (Reprise)", "You're Never Fully Dressed Without A Smile", "Finale Medley: I Don't Need Anything But You/We Got Annie/Tomorrow").
