= Distant Thunder (1988 film) =

1988 film by Rick Rosenthal

- Theatrical release poster
- Directed by: Rick Rosenthal
- Written by: Robert Stitzel; Deedee Wehle
- Produced by: Robert Schaffel
- Starring: John Lithgow; Ralph Macchio
- Cinematography: Ralf D. Bode
- Edited by: Dennis Virkler
- Music by: Maurice Jarre
- Distributed by: Paramount Pictures
- Release date: November 11, 1988
- Running time: 114 minutes
- Country: United States
- Language: English
- Budget: $8 million
- Box office: $156,188

Distant Thunder is a 1988 American drama film directed by Rick Rosenthal and starring John Lithgow and Ralph Macchio.

== Plot ==
The film tells the story of a troubled ex-Navy SEAL and Vietnam War veteran Mark Lambert who, upon returning home from the war, alienates his wife Barbara and son Jack by deserting them and moving away into the remote wilderness of Washington state.

After 10 years of living off the land and suffering from post-traumatic stress disorder, Mark decides to rejoin civilized society and finds his now teenage son Jack, who is living in Illinois. As an estranged father and recluse, Mark quickly finds himself unprepared for the changes that he must face.

== Cast ==
- John Lithgow as Mark Lambert
- Ralph Macchio as Jack Lambert
- Kerrie Keane as Char
- Reb Brown as Harvey Nitz
- Janet Margolin as Barbara Lambert
- Denis Arndt as Larry
- Jamey Sheridan as Moss
- Tom Bower as Louis
- John Kelly as Andy
- Michael Currie as Coach Swabey
- Hilary Strang as Jane
- Robyn Stevan as Holly
- David Longworth as Sheriff
- Gordon Currie as Billy Watson
- Walter Marsh as The Principal
- Allan Lysell as Buddy
- Kate Robbins as The Waitress
- David Glyn-Jones as The Waiter
- Denalda Williams as Jeanette

== Reception ==
The film received mixed reviews from movie critics. Roger Ebert gave the film 3 out of 4 stars, writing John Lithgow's performance "is at the heart of the movie, and at the heart of his work is the way he smokes a cigarette or avoids looking anyone in the eye."

On the review aggregator website Rotten Tomatoes, 43% of 7 critics' reviews are positive, with an average rating of 5.3/10.

The Veterans Administration was not happy with the film's depiction of suicide among veterans and the director agreed to remove a title in the end credits highlighting the suicide rate among veterans following the VA's objection.

=== Box office ===
The film was originally due for release at the end of September but was delayed until Veterans Day (November 11, 1988), when it was released on a single screen in 14 cities in the United States plus "mini-multiple runs" in Dallas and Seattle, which were the only two cities where it received a major marketing push. The movie was a box-office flop, grossing $82,186 in its opening weekend from 31 screens and with a total revenue of barely $150,000 for a $8 million budget, which the LA Times reported was the worst performing film in the United States for the year when comparing the ratio of gross to budget.
