= Cry for the Strangers (film) =

1982 American made-for-television film

- Genre: Horror; Mystery; Thriller
- Based on: Cry for the Strangers by John Saul
- Written by: J.D. Feigelson
- Directed by: Peter Medak
- Starring: Patrick Duffy
- Country of origin: United States
- Original language: English

Production
- Executive producer: David Gerber
- Producers: Jay Daniel; Stephen Cragg; Christopher N. Seiter
- Cinematography: Frank Stanley
- Editors: Rick Brandon; David Wages
- Running time: 97 minutes
- Production companies: David Gerber Productions; MGM Television

Original release
- Network: CBS
- Release: December 11, 1982

Cry for the Strangers is a 1982 American made-for-television horror film based on the book of the same name by John Saul. It was directed by Peter Medak and stars Patrick Duffy. It was originally broadcast on CBS on December 11, 1982.

== Plot ==
In 1937, a young boy wakes up in the middle of the night and sees apparitions of Native Americans dancing on the beach before discovering his grandparents' bodies buried up to their heads in sand. He later grows up to become the head of the police. The townspeople call him Chief Whalen.

Flash forward to 1982. Dr. Brad Russell (Patrick Duffy), a Seattle psychiatrist, and his wife Elaine (Cindy Pickett) move to a fishing town on the Pacific coast. There, they learn of a local legend that thunderstorms in the area are accompanied by apparitions of Native-Americans dancing on the beach. A local fisherman, Riley (Jeff Corey), believes they are ghosts of the "storm dancers," a tribal sect that once performed executions by burying victims up to their necks in beach sand so that when the tide came in, they drowned. Riley believes these visions are connected to a series of mysterious deaths occurring in the community. Chief Whalen (Brian Keith) scoffs at the stories. As far as he's concerned, legends don't kill people. People kill people.

By coincidence, Robby Palmer (Shawn Carson), a hyperactive child Dr. Russell treated years before, is now normal and living with his family in the same town. One night during a thunderstorm, Robby goes into a trance on the beach. Nearby, his mother Rebecca (Claire Malis) has fallen into a pit and is screaming for Robby to help her. Robby doesn't move a muscle. She is finally rescued when her husband (Lawrence Pressman) appears. Yet later, when queried about the incident, Robby claims he can't recall a thing. The next night, Robby sneaks out to the beach, and his sister Missy (Robin Ignico) follows him. While searching for them, Dr. Russell and others find Riley's corpse. Not only that, they spot Chief Whalen covered in fake war paint, trying to kill Missy. He is shot dead by his own deputy. Dr. Russell theorizes the storms triggered Whalen's traumatic childhood memories, leading him to re-enact their deaths by killing others. Elaine wonders who killed Whalen's grandparents in the first place. Dissolve to a night shot of Robby, observing the apparitions dancing to another storm.

== Cast ==
- Patrick Duffy as Dr. Brad Russell
- Cindy Pickett as Elaine Russell
- Lawrence Pressman as Glen Palmer
- Brian Keith as Chief Whalen
- Claire Malis as Rebecca Palmer
- Robin Ignico as Missy Palmer
- Shawn Carson as Robby Palmer
- Jeff Corey as Riley
- Taylor Lacher as Connor
- Parley Baer as Doc Phelps
- Anita Dangler as Miriam Shelling
- Martin Kove as Jeff
- J.V. Bradley as Merle
- Josef James as Young Whalen
- Jerry-Mac Johnston as Max Horton
