= Some Kind of Hero =

1982 film by Michael Pressman

- The movie poster for Some Kind of Hero.
- Directed by: Michael Pressman
- Written by: Robert Boris; James Kirkwood Jr.
- Based on: Some Kind of Hero by James Kirkwood Jr.
- Produced by: Howard W. Koch
- Starring: Richard Pryor; Margot Kidder; Ray Sharkey
- Cinematography: King Baggot
- Edited by: Christopher Greenbury
- Music by: Patrick Williams
- Distributed by: Paramount Pictures
- Release date: April 2, 1982
- Running time: 97 minutes
- Country: United States
- Language: English
- Budget: $8 million
- Box office: $23.7 million

Some Kind of Hero is a 1982 American comedy-drama film starring Richard Pryor as Eddie Keller, a returning Vietnam War veteran having trouble adjusting to civilian life. Soon he is involved in an organized crime heist. It co-stars Margot Kidder and was directed by Michael Pressman.

Although James Kirkwood and Robert Boris are jointly credited with the screenplay, the script was in fact Boris' rewrite of Kirkwood's adaptation of his novel of the same name. Originally intended to be a straight drama, the studio insisted that Pryor perform comedic scenes as well. However, Pryor agreed with the importance of the screenplay's grounded tone and maintained a dramatic performance when filming.

== Plot ==
Eddie Keller is one of the last POWs to be brought home from Vietnam, after several years of torture and deprivation at the hands of the Vietcong. During his captivity, he resists signing a "confession" admitting to war crimes repeatedly, but finally consents to save the life of Vinnie DiAngelo, another prisoner.

Having returned home, Eddie finds the world has moved on without him. His wife Lisa Keller has fallen in love with someone new, and had a daughter Laurie, just after he became a POW. His mother Jesse Keller has suffered a stroke and requires constant (and expensive) medical attention. Eddie is initially called a hero when he is finally released, but when his signed confession is discovered his veteran's benefits are suspended by the Veterans Administration pending further investigation.

Eddie tries to reintegrate into society but finds himself stopped at every turn. The Army refuses to help, he cannot find a job, and he is running out of options. The only bright spot in his life is Toni Donovan, a high-priced prostitute who picks Eddie up at a bar. Despite Toni's profession, the two begin a romance.

While trying to secure a loan, Eddie is witness to a bank robbery. He begins to plot a way to gain the funds he needs to provide for his mother, and also to avenge himself on a system that abandoned him in Vietnam, then turned him into a traitor.

Eddie plans to hold up a bank but fails repeatedly in his efforts to embark on a life of crime. Eventually, he succeeds in stealing a briefcase full of bonds, which he arranges to sell to mobster Tommy Morelli for $100,000. Morelli and his fellow mobsters plan to kill Eddie and take the bonds. Eddie turns the tables on the mobsters, leading to their arrest at his hotel, but cornering himself reflecting his capture in Vietnam.

Trapped, Eddie calls Toni, confessing to his crimes and tells her he'll turn himself in. She pleads with him to escape with her, and they confess their feelings for each other. As the police evacuate the building, Eddie decides to confront them in his Army uniform. Much to his surprise, the officers are very patriotic, and assume him to not be their suspect. He is then rushed away from the scene, where Toni arrives and picks him up with both the $100,000 and the bonds.

In one of the closing scenes, a bank employee is seen delivering a large envelope to a man in an office. The envelope has the bank's address and is marked as being for the attention of the bank's president. The man opens the package and finds the bonds that had been stolen from them, and a note from Eddie saying, "Thanks for the loan".

== Cast ==
- Richard Pryor as Eddie Keller
- Margot Kidder as Toni Donovan
- Ray Sharkey as Vinnie DiAngelo
- Ronny Cox as Col. Powers
- Sandy Ward as Col. Maxwell
- Lynne Moody as Lisa Keller
- Paul Benjamin as Leon
- Olivia Cole as Jesse
- Martin Azarow as Tank
- Shelly Batt as Olivia
- Susan Berlin as Jeanette
- Matt Clark as Mickey
- John Fujioka as Captain Tan Tai
- Peter Jason as Honcho #1
- Herbie Braha as Honcho #2
- Raymond Guth as Motel Clerk
- Anne Haney as Monica Lewis
- Mary Jackson as Frances
- Caren Kaye as Sheila Daniels
- Nan Martin as Hilda Munson
- Bill Morey as Major Ryan
- Antony Ponzini as Sal
- Jude Farese as Bandit
- Warren Munson as Bank President
- Kario Salem as Young Soldier
- Jon Van Ness as Powers' Aide
- Pearl Shear as Customer
- David Byrd as Doorman
- David Banks as Disc Jockey
- Nicholas Mele as Officer
- Harvey Parry as Old Drunk
- Richard McKenzie as Lt. Col. Victor Solkin
- Danny Wong as Tough Guard
- Tim Thomerson as Cal Kowalski
- Jonathan Goldsmith as Tommy Morelli

== Production ==
The film had been in development for a number of years. Eventually Richard Pryor agreed to do it.

== Reception ==
The film gained mixed reviews, feeling the comedy was subpar but praised the social commentary of Vietnam veterans feeling abandoned by society, and was a minor success at the box office.

== See also ==
- List of American films of 1982
