= Don't Go to Sleep =

1982 television film directed by Richard Lang

- VHS artwork
- Genre: Horror; Mystery
- Written by: Ned Wynn
- Directed by: Richard Lang
- Starring: Valerie Harper; Dennis Weaver; Ruth Gordon; Robin Ignico; Oliver Robins; Kristin Cumming
- Theme music composer: Dominic Frontiere
- Country of origin: United States
- Original language: English

Production
- Executive producers: Douglas S. Cramer; Aaron Spelling
- Producer: Richard Lang
- Production locations: Warner Brothers Burbank Studios - 4000 Warner Boulevard, Burbank, California, USA
- Cinematography: Chuck Arnold
- Editor: Patrick Kennedy
- Running time: 93 minutes
- Production companies: Spelling Television; Warner Bros. Television

Original release
- Network: ABC
- Release: December 10, 1982

Don't Go To Sleep is a 1982 American made-for-television horror film that was produced and directed by Richard Lang. The movie features Dennis Weaver, Valerie Harper, Ruth Gordon, and Robert Webber, and youngsters Kristin Cumming, Robin Ignico, and Oliver Robins.

The film focuses on daughter Mary's encounters with the ghost of her late sister, Jennifer, who perished in a car crash and is out for revenge.

== Plot ==
A family of four including parents, Phillip and Laura, son Kevin and daughter Mary move to a new home; they are accompanied by Grandma Bernice, for whom no one other than Laura cares very much. Mourning the recent loss of daughter Jennifer, the family is looking to put the tragedy behind them and start a new life.

After moving in, Mary hears what sounds like her dead sister's voice calling to her from beneath the bed. When she checks it out, Mary's stunned to find that her sister has returned as a ghost. Jennifer appears to Mary numerous times in secret, ultimately communicating her desire to kill the entire family, except for Mary, as an act of revenge.

Following this revelation from Mary, the family members suffer an assortment of twisted fates: the appearance of Kevin's pet iguana in Grandma Bernice's bed causes the elderly woman to suffer a fatal heart attack; Kevin's attempt to retrieve a Frisbee from the roof results in a deadly fall; the radio Phillip listens to while bathing ends up electrocuting him. Laura barely escapes, injuring her arm.

Based on the belief that she committed the murders, Mary is placed in a mental institution and soon experiences a flashback concerning Jennifer's fate. In the flashback, while riding home from their grandmother's house, Kevin convinces Mary to play a prank on Jennifer and they tie her shoelaces together. In addition to being jealous of their parents' favoritism toward their sister, Kevin and Mary are fed up with Jennifer's constant bullying. When a van collides with their car, everyone except Jennifer manages to escape. She screams for help as Mary runs to inform her father of Jennifer's plight, but Phillip is unable to rescue her before the car bursts into flames. Back in the present, Mary now claims that she is actually Jennifer; the deceased sister has possessed her living sister. Mary screams for Jennifer not to leave and that she "loved her".

Later, as Laura sleeps in her bedroom, she is awakened by a sound at the foot of her bed. Jennifer's ghost pops up and says, "Hi, Mommy." The movie ends with Laura's terrified screams.

== Cast ==
- Valerie Harper as Laura
- Dennis Weaver as Phillip
- Ruth Gordon as Bernice
- Oliver Robins as Kevin
- Robin Ignico as Mary
- Kristin Cumming as Jennifer
- Claudette Nevins as Dr. Robin Samuel
- Robert Webber as Dr. Cole
- Marilyn Coleman as Sarah
- Tim Haldeman as the Intern
- Haven Earle Haley as the Priest
- Ned Wynn as the Paramedic
- Ross Porter as the Radio Sportscaster (voice)

== Reception ==
Don't Go to Sleep has received generally positive reviews, with praise for its suspense and performances. Maitland McDonagh of TV Guide awarded the film three out of five stars, commending the film's acting, screenplay, and suspense, calling it "a tight, genuinely scary made-for-TV thriller". Todd Martin from HorrorNews.net offered similar praise for the performances, suspense, and script, as well as the film's ominous tone, and soundtrack. Brian Collins, in a retrospective on Birth.Movies.Death, lauded the film's scares, performances, and mounting tension for retaining their effectiveness years after its first release, although Collins did note that the film's pacing was slower than it should be.

Mark R. Hasan of KQEK rated the film "Very Good", calling Ned Wynn's script "quite clever" and noting that Lang's direction "emphasizes pacing, mood, and little visual gestures", though he found some of the performances "wobbly". Steven West of Horror Screams Video Vault gave the film five stars, calling it "an unerringly creepy picture" and highlighting Kevin's fatal fall from the roof, an extended point-of-view shot of a pizza cutter moving up the staircase, and a final twist he described as "as bleak as they come". Hysteria Lives praised the performances of Weaver, Harper and Gordon and placed the film "right up there with" Trilogy of Terror among the best television horror films of its era.
