= Million Dollar Infield =

1982 television film by Hal Cooper

- Genre: Comedy; Drama
- Written by: Phil Mishkin (as Philip Mishkin); Rob Reiner
- Screenplay by: Dick Wimmer
- Story by: Dick Wimmer
- Directed by: Hal Cooper
- Starring: Rob Reiner; Bonnie Bedelia; Robert Costanzo; Christopher Guest; Bruno Kirby
- Music by: Artie Kane
- Country of origin: United States
- Original language: English

Production
- Cinematography: Thomas Del Ruth
- Editor: Jim Benson
- Running time: 100 minutes
- Production company: CBS Entertainment Production

Original release
- Network: CBS
- Release: February 2, 1982

Million Dollar Infield is a 1982 TV film starring Bonnie Bedelia and Rob Reiner.

== Plot ==
Four wealthy Long Islanders play for an amateur softball team. All four men suffer from profound personal and professional problems, thus the weekly ball game becomes a method of working out their frustrations. So adept do they become at this cathartic activity that their team makes it to the statewide championship—which leads to yet another crisis.

== Cast ==
- Rob Reiner as Monte Miller
- Bonnie Bedelia as Marcia Miller
- Robert Costanzo as Artie Levitas
- Christopher Guest as Bucky Frische
- Bruno Kirby as Lou Buonomato
- Candice Azzara as Rochelle Levitas (as Candy Azzara)
- Gretchen Corbett as Carole Frische
- Elizabeth Wilson as Sally Ephron
- Philip Sterling as Harry Ephron
- Meeno Peluce as Joshua Miller
- Oliver Robins as Aaron Miller
- Shera Danese as Bunny Wahl
- Jack Dodson as Chuck
- Elsa Raven as Dr. Isabel Armen
- Neil Billingsley as Jay Frische
- Keith Coogan as Vance Levitas (as Keith Mitchell)
- Mel Allen as himself
