= Dick Wimmer =

American novelist

Dick Wimmer

Richard Samuel Wimmer (June 18, 1936 – May 18, 2011) was an American author, editor and creative writing instructor known for his trilogy of novels the Irish Wine Trilogy. He claimed to be the most rejected published author in history.

== Early life ==
Born in New York City to Sidney and Frances Wimmer, Wimmer grew up in Great Neck, Long Island, New York. He earned a bachelor's degree from Cornell University in 1958 and master's degrees in English from both Yale University (1959) and Columbia University (1974).

== Career ==
His first book, Irish Wine (1989. Mercury House), was published when he was 53 years old. He had relentlessly attempted to get that work published since the early 1970s, but had received a total of 162 rejections for the book from publishing houses over a more than 25-year period before the work was finally accepted for publication. Irish Wine proved to be a success with critics but was never a bestseller. Two sequels followed to form the Irish Wine Trilogy: Boyne’s Lassie (1998) and Hagar’s Dream. He also edited several books about sports. Wimmer also wrote the script to a TV movie, Million Dollar Infield (1982).

In addition to his writing, Wimmer worked as an adjunct professor of English at more than two dozen colleges and universities during his lifetime.

== Personal life ==
Wimmer's was married and divorced. He had two sons, Ceo and Geordie, and five grandchildren. He died on May 18, 2011, at age 74 at his home in Agoura Hills, California.
