= Daniel Ohebshalom =

American real estate investor and slumlord

- Other names: Johnathan Santana
- Occupation: Real estate investor
- Known for: Neglect of tenants & hundreds of violations of the housing code in New York City.

Daniel Ohebshalom is an American real estate investor and infamous slumlord in New York City. He has gained public attention due to repeated legal actions against him for failing to maintain safe and habitable conditions in several rental properties, particularly in Washington Heights.

== Career ==
Ohebshalom has been active in the New York City real estate market, owning multiple rental buildings, primarily in Washington Heights. His business operations are managed through several limited liability companies, a structure that has contributed to difficulty in tracking his full property holdings. His management practices have drawn scrutiny due to a history of unresolved housing violations and tenant complaints.

== Legal issues ==
Ohebshalom has faced numerous legal challenges related to his property management. City agencies have cited his buildings for hundreds of housing violations, including inadequate heating, mold, pest infestations, and structural hazards. In March 2024, after failing to comply with court orders to correct dangerous conditions at two Washington Heights properties, he was sentenced to 60 days in jail at Rikers Island.

In May 2024, the Manhattan District Attorney's Office indicted Ohebshalom and several affiliated companies on charges of tenant harassment, falsifying records, and endangering the welfare of a child. Prosecutors alleged that he deliberately neglected buildings to force out rent-regulated tenants, thereby increasing property values and potential profits.

== Public perception ==
Ohebshalom's behavior had been profiled by the media for nearly two decades before the courts in New York City took action against him. He has been repeatedly ranked among the worst landlords in New York City by Jumaane D. Williams, the city's Public Advocate. Ohebshalom's properties have been at the center of tenant protests and legal battles for decades, with advocacy groups consistently calling for stronger enforcement against landlords with persistent violations.

== See also ==
- Tenant rights
- Real estate in New York City
