= Oliver Robins =

American actor

- Born: August 17, 1971 (age 54)
- Occupations: actor, writer, director
- Years active: 1982–present
- Known for: Robbie Freeling in Poltergeist

Oliver Robins (born August 17, 1971) is an American actor, writer and director.

== Career ==
Robins's first film roles were in the 1982 CBS TV movie Million Dollar Infield as Aaron Miller and the 1982 ABC TV-movie Don't Go to Sleep as Kevin. He is best known for his portrayal of Robbie Freeling in the 1982 feature film Poltergeist and its 1986 sequel Poltergeist II: The Other Side. His other feature film role was in the 1982 comedy Airplane II: The Sequel as Jimmy.

He made one television guest appearance in the 1986 Twilight Zone episode "Monsters!".

Robins left the acting business after 1986. As an adult, he returned to show business as a writer and director. In 2000, he wrote and directed his first film, Dumped, which was released directly to video, and also wrote and directed Roomies in 2004. He wrote the 1999 movie Eating L.A.. Following the deaths of Dominique Dunne (although Dunne was actually in her early 20s) and Heather O'Rourke, Robins became the only surviving Poltergeist child actor, as well as the longest-lived.

== Filmography ==
=== Film ===
Year	Title	Role	Notes
1982	Poltergeist	Robbie Freeling	
1982	Airplane II: The Sequel	Jimmy Wilson	
1984	Terror in the Aisles	Robbie Freeling	Documentary
1986	Poltergeist II: The Other Side	Robbie Freeling	
2004	Wild Roomies	—N/a	Director
2008	Man Overboard	Customer	Also director and producer
2014	Killer Legends	Robbie Freeling	Documentary
2019	Celebrity Crush	Jonathan Blaklee	Also writer and director
2022	The Rideshare Killer	Billy Smith	

=== Television ===
Year	Title	Role	Notes
1982	Million Dollar Infield	Aaron Miller	Television film
1982	Don't Go to Sleep	Kevin	Television film
1986	The Twilight Zone	Toby Michaels	Episode: "Monsters!"
2017	Spielberg	—N/a	Television film
