= Gwen Wetzler =

American producer, director and animator

Gwen Sandiff Wetzler
- Born: Erie, Pennsylvania, U.S.
- Occupations: Film and television animation producer, director, and animator.
- Years active: 1955–present

Gwen Wetzler is an American producer, director and animator and is best known as the first woman to produce and direct animation for a major network.

== Early years ==
At a young age while growing up in Erie, Pennsylvania, Gwen Wetzler found her love of art. During high school Wetzler would paint signs for local businesses because of her artistic ability and steady hand. In the early 1950s Gwen was married and moved from Pennsylvania to suburban Los Angeles. In 1955 she started in the animation business at Disney as an in between animator on such classics as Sleeping Beauty and Lady and the Tramp.

== Career ==
In 1977, after 20 years at Disney, Wetzler became the first woman to direct and produce animation at major studios including MGM, Warner Bros. and the Hanna-Barbera Studios.

Wetzler's directorial debut was on Fat Albert and the Cosby Kids which led to further projects. Other directed titles include The Transformers, The New Adventures of Batman, My Little Pony, The New Archie/Sabrina Hour, Flash Gordon and Sport Billy among others. Her later directorial work included He-Man and the Masters of the Universe, She-Ra, Spawn, Tiny Toon Adventures, and All Dogs Go to Heaven: The Series.

In the 1980s, Wetzler became the first woman to produce animation for a major studio; she produced The Transformers, Jem, and The Legend of Prince Valiant.

Along with directing, producing, and animating series, Wetzler also worked on feature full-length feature films such as Mighty Mouse.

Gwen Wetzler retired from the animation industry in the early 2000s, giving her time to focus primarily on her artwork.

== Selected filmography ==
=== Films ===
- Animator of A Snow White Christmas (1982)
- Director of Mighty Mouse in the Great Space Chase (1983)
- Animator of We Think the World is Round (1984)
- Director of The Secret of the Sword (1985)
- Director - Segment - The Cat and the Spider of Skeletor's Revenge (1986)
- Animation Director of My Little Pony (1986)
- Timing Director of Little Nemo: Adventures in Slumberland (1992)
- Timing and Sheet Director of An All Dogs Christmas Carol (1998)
- Timing Director of The Sissy Duckling (1999)
- Animation Timing Director of Alvin and the Chipmunks Meet the Wolfman (2000)

=== Television ===
- Director of The New Adventures of Batman (1978)
- Animation Director of Super Witch (1978)
- Director of Batman and the Super Seven (1981)
- Director of Flash Gordon: The Greatest Adventure of All (1983)
- Director of The New Adventures of Flash Gordon (1983)
- Director of He-Man and the Masters of the Universe (1983)
- Director of She-Ra: Princess of Power (1986)
- Sheet Director of All Dogs Go to Heaven (1989)
- Animation Director of The Real Adventures of Jonny Quest (1996)
- Director of Little Orphan Annie's Very Animated Christmas (1995)
- G.I. Joe: Extreme (1997)
- Animator in The Lionhearts (1999)
- Three Little Pigs: From the Series "Happily Ever After: Fairy Tales For Every Child" (1999)
- Empress's Nightingale: An Animated Special From "The Happily Ever After: Fairy Tales For Every Child" Series (2000)
- Happy Prince: An Animated Special From "The Happily Ever After: Fairy Tales For Every Child" Series (2000)
- Frog Princess: An Animated Special From the "Happily Ever After: Fairy Tales For Every Child" Series (2000)
- Sissy Duckling (2000)
- Robinita Hood: An Animated Special From the "Happily Ever After: Fairy Tales For Every Child" Series2 (2000)
- Rip Van Winkle: An Animated Special From the "Happily Ever After: Fairy Tales For Every Child" Series (2000)
- Henny Penny: An Animated Special From "The Happily Ever After: Fairy Tales For Every Child" Series (2000)
- Dragon Tales (2002)
- Creator of Smile Haven (2025)
