= Bill Morey =

American actor

- Born: December 19, 1919; Framingham, Massachusetts, U.S.
- Died: December 10, 2003 (aged 83); Santa Monica, California, U.S.
- Years active: 1940s-2003

Bill Morey (December 19, 1919 – December 10, 2003) was an American character actor. He was perhaps best known for portraying Oscar in the 1990s sitcom, The John Larroquette Show.

== Biography ==
=== Early life ===
Morey was born on December 19, 1919, in Framingham, Massachusetts. He was a World War II veteran.

=== Career ===
Morey began his career in the 1940s, performing on stage and radio. He moved to Traverse City, Michigan, because of the Cherry County Playhouse, where he acted their productions during the 1950s and early 1960s. In addition, he acted in and directed productions at the Civic Theater, the former name of what is now the Old Town Playhouse during the early 1960s. Morey also worked in local radio and television while residing in Traverse City.

Morey was awarded the 1970 Joseph Jefferson Award for Best Actor in a Supporting Role for his performance in Janus at the Pheasant Run Playhouse in Chicago. It was there when he was discovered by Michael Ritchie, who cast Morey in his first feature role in Prime Cut (1972). From then on, Morey moved to Los Angeles in 1974 where he continued to work in film and television until his retirement in 2001.

=== Personal life and death ===
Morey was first married to a woman by the name of Chris. They met while both were employed by the WWJ television station in Detroit. He was also the father of sons Christopher and Michael and daughter Dianne. On December 10, 2003, Morey died of natural causes a week before his 84th birthday in a Santa Monica hospital.

== Partial filmography ==
- Prime Cut (1972)
- Death Race 2000 (1975) - Deacon
- The Onion Field (1979) - Lawyer #1
- Whitcomb's War (1980)
- Enola Gay: The Men, the Mission, the Atomic Bomb (1980) - General of the Army George C. Marshall
- This House Possessed (1981) - Robbins
- Some Kind of Hero (1982) - Major Ryan
- Brainstorm (1983) - James Zimbach
- Ghost Warrior (1984) - Doctor Carl Anderson
- Omega Syndrome (1986) - Dr. Lloyd Pearson
- Real Men (1987) - Millard Cunard
- Elvira, Mistress of the Dark (1988) - Mr. Rivers
- Big Man on Campus (1989) - Dean Crawford
- Dad (1989) - Hal McCarthy
