= Ralph Strait =

American actor (1936–1992)

- Born: July 8, 1936
- Died: July 31, 1992 (aged 56); New York City, New York, U.S.

Ralph Strait (July 8, 1936 – July 31, 1992) was an American actor who starred in film and on television. He was known for his role in the 1982 cult film The Beastmaster as Sacco, also that year he played a supporting role in the horror movie Halloween III: Season of the Witch as Buddy Kupfer, and that year he starred in They Call Me Bruce?.

He starred on the soap opera Search for Tomorrow as Dan Stone from 1985 to 1986. Strait had made guest appearances on TV shows, some of those shows range from The Incredible Hulk, Eight Is Enough, and Magnum, P.I.. In 1992, Strait died at the age of 56 in New York City of a heart attack.

== Filmography ==
Year	Title	Role	Notes
1974	The Super Cops	Instructor	
1982	The Beastmaster	Sacco	
1982	Halloween III: Season of the Witch	Buddy Kupfer	
1982	They Call Me Bruce?	Officer #2	
1982	Hart to Hart	Phil	Season 4 Episode "Harts On Campus"
1993	Me and Veronica	Bar Customer #3	(final film role)
