= Martin Azarow =

American film and television actor

- Azarow in They Call Me Bruce?, 1982
- Born: Martin Monroe Azarow; July 4, 1934; Brooklyn, New York, U.S.
- Died: September 8, 2003 (aged 69); Las Vegas, Nevada, U.S.
- Occupation(s): Film and television actor
- Years active: 1976–1990
- Spouse: Marjorie Azarow

Martin Monroe Azarow (July 4, 1934 – September 8, 2003) was an American film and television actor. He was known for playing Big Al in the 1982 film They Call Me Bruce?.

Born in Brooklyn, New York, Azarow appeared in television programs including Taxi, Remington Steele, T.J. Hooker, It's a Living, L.A. Law, Hill Street Blues, St. Elsewhere, Charlie's Angels, Doogie Howser, M.D., The New Mike Hammer and Hooperman. He also appeared in films such as Some Kind of Hero, Mae West and Jo Jo Dancer, Your Life Is Calling.

Azarow died on September 8, 2003, in Las Vegas, Nevada, at the age of 69.

== Filmography ==
=== Film ===
Year	Title	Role	Notes	Ref.
1977	The Magnificent Magical Magnet of Santa Mesa	Lombardi	TV movie	
1981	Born to Be Sold	Louie Blatz	TV movie	
1982	Some Kind of Hero	Tank		
1982	Mae West	Detective	TV movie	
1982	They Call Me Bruce?	Big Al		
1983	Missing Pieces	Hector Bolinas	TV movie	
1984	The Outlaws	Emil	TV movie	
1986	Jo Jo Dancer, Your Life Is Calling	Gangster #2		
1987	The Jigsaw Murders	Leon Murch		

=== Television ===
Year	Title	Role	Notes	Ref.
1976	Starsky & Hutch	Packrat	1 episode	
1978	Charlie's Angels	George Danforth	1 episode	
1979	Eight Is Enough	Will Burdett	1 episode	
1979	Operation Petticoat	Engineer Manganini	2 episodes	
1980	The White Shadow	Party Guest	1 episode	
1981	It's a Living	Mr. Scolick	1 episode	
1981-1985	Hill Street Blues	Dr. Sackheim/Cigar Smoker/Mortician	3 episodes	
1982	Hart to Hart	Mr. Brooklyn	1 episode	
1982	T.J. Hooker	Harry Wheeler	1 episode	
1982-1987	Cagney & Lacey	Ralph Steer	2 episodes	
1982	St. Elsewhere	Fat Man	1 episode	
1983	Nine to Five	Gregory	1 episode	
1983	Taxi	Leon (arm-wrestling cabbie)	1 episode	
1983	Remington Steele	Kessel Parks	1 episode	
1983	The A-Team	Danny	1 episode	
1984	The New Mike Hammer	Fat Man	1 episode	
1984	V	Rodrigo	1 episode	
1985	Brothers	Mr. Pappola	1 episode	
1986	The Twilight Zone	Man	1 episode	
1986	Hunter	Henry Bartholomew	1 episode	
1987-1988	L.A. Law	Robert Sylvia	3 episodes	
1988	Ohara	Josephson	1 episode	
1988	Max Headroom	Punk	1 episode	
1989	Hooperman	Cabbie	1 episode	
1989	Doogie Howser, M.D.	William Finkelstein	1 episode	
1989	Pee-wee's Playhouse	Michael Angelo	1 episode	
1989	Matlock	Proprietor	1 episode	
1990	Equal Justice	Arty	1 episode	
