= Mighty Mouse in the Great Space Chase =

1982 film by Gwen Wetzler

- Theatrical release poster
- Directed by: Ed Friedman; Lou Kachivas; Marsh Lamore; Gwen Wetzler; Kay Wright; Lou Zukor
- Produced by: Don Christensen; Norm Prescott; Lou Scheimer
- Starring: Alan Oppenheimer; Diane Pershing; Lou Scheimer
- Cinematography: R.W. Pope
- Edited by: Earl Biddle; Jim Blodgett; Ann Hagerman
- Music by: Ray Ellis; Norm Prescott
- Production companies: Filmation Associates; Viacom Productions
- Distributed by: Children's Video Library (1983) (U.S. VHS); Filmation Associates; Miracle; CBS Television Distribution
- Release date: December 10, 1982
- Running time: 86 minutes
- Country: United States
- Language: English

The serialized Mighty Mouse story "The Great Space Chase" from The New Adventures of Mighty Mouse and Heckle & Jeckle seen on the popular Saturday morning series was re-edited into a 1982 superhero comedy film by Filmation.

The film got a big-screen release, a re-release as a kids' matinee film, and was released on VHS. The film version also omitted a few scenes from the original serialized version.

== Story ==
In the vast reaches of space, Oil Can Harry is chasing Queen Pearl Pureheart of the Interstellar Federation, when she informs him he is both speeding and has violated sector code 6655A, attacking a star cruiser. His reason for wanting to destroy her and the ISF is that "everybody's got to have a hobby". Pearl's ship escapes both an asteroid belt and the Milky Way, while Harry's ship does not. Eventually, Harry's ship hides in a black hole and uses it to capture Pearl's ship. She then summons Mighty Mouse to her rescue with the "Save Our Necklace", prompting Harry to release his "Catatomic Catomaton", a giant robot cat that can destroy planets, melt steel walls, and crush spaceships. The Save Our Necklace sends a 3D holographic distress signal that finds Mighty Mouse no matter where he is, and he sees it while lifting weights at his house, which is in the shape of a crescent moon and made of cheese.

While the cat robot battles Mighty Mouse unsuccessfully, Pearl decides she can't wait, so she sneaks out and pulls out the catship's whisker, freeing it, but leaving her behind. Her first mate doesn't realize this until another crew member mentions "one new queen" in the supplies list in the damage report. The first mate uses the necklace to contact Mighty Mouse, who then discovers the cat robot was just a giant wind-up toy, and unwinds it. He then rushes to save Pearl, whom he finds hooked up to Harry's "Psycho-Recycler", which allows him to read minds. This is because he tried to force her to tell him where the ISF hides the Doomsday Device, a giant vacuum cleaner that sucks up everything in the galaxy, and she refused. In spite of his instructions to Swifty, his first mate, not to press the foot pedal, Swifty does so upon hearing Harry shout, "Step on it!", when the security scanners detected Mighty Mouse, and the rest of the cat crew verbalizes warnings since the alarms failed. Pearl's brain ends up in Harry's body, and vice versa. Mighty Mouse did not see this happen, so he assumes the two are still normal, and takes Pearl's body (with Harry objecting), back to the mouse ship.

The mouse ship then continues its mission, and Harry hides a cassette tape player to fool the crew into believing Pearl is sound asleep. As he then vandalizes the ship by altering the course and dropping a monkey wrench into the warp drive, causing the ship to spin out of control (but then regrets it because he is also on board the ship and he is thus doomed himself), Pearl angers Swifty when she tells him to let the mouse ship go, and he determines he is not speaking to Harry. Security alerts are sent out, and Swifty and the gang eventually catch Pearl and throw her in the ship's jail cell. However, this doesn't happen without Pearl taking a fire extinguisher and placing it under Swifty's body, and he takes a wild ride on it. When the extinguisher crashes, he tells the crew that he is taking over command because "something's happened to Harry the Heartless".

Mighty Mouse spots the ship spinning out of control and puts a stop to it, also saving it from a horde of asteroids. He finds the monkey wrench in the warp drive, and thinks he's telling Pearl this information. Harry speaks in his falsetto to sound like Pearl. He convinces Mighty Mouse to take the ship to the planet Humongo for repairs, on the basis that because the ISF keeps the Doomsday Device there, it also has repair facilities. Mighty Mouse agrees, in spite of noting that "you have a strange sense of humor, Queen Pearl". Harry then tries to contact the crew, but gets no answer, because the crew is chasing Pearl around the ship, eventually cornering her in a dark room.

Upon arriving at Humongo, Mighty Mouse lands the ship at the repair facilities, while Harry takes pictures of the secret installations with a camera. Mighty Mouse asks the mechanics (two robot mice) to fix the ship while mentioning the problem, and Humongo's giant mice ask him for autographs. He lets the fake Pearl know that he is going to the gym for a workout, after pointing out that "she" could have just bought the postcard set instead of taking all the pictures.

Harry successfully gets through to the crew upon attempting contact, but accidentally opens the Save Our Necklace, allowing Mighty Mouse to see the truth: Harry's brain in inside Pearl's body. Harry also threatens his crew that he will personally exile them to the dog squad (a crew of dogs inside a dogship that is trapped inside the Doomsday Device), and the crew snap to attention. Swifty then exclaims to himself that Harry is in jail, but hears Harry scream at him that the brains are switched, and that Pearl has been captured. Harry even reveals that he found the location of the Doomsday Device, then notices the necklace, wondering what it is, but doesn't care in the end. Mighty Mouse flies off to save Pearl from the catship.

Upon breaking into the jail cell, Mighty Mouse reveals to Pearl that he has discovered the brains are switched, after she panics upon seeing him. She gives him a kiss, but he coughs and chokes, asking her to wait until she's back in her own body. She apologizes, stating that she lost her head. He opens the jail cell door and leads her to the Psycho-Recycler, and a crew member spots him and sounds the alarm. However, the crew is too late; they catch Mighty Mouse in the act of switching the brains back, by running in a wheel that revs up enough energy, and commanding Pearl to push the button at the right moment. When she does, the brains are switched back to normal. Now Harry is back aboard the ship, and Pearl is on the planet Humongo. He beats up his crew members who prevent him from attacking Mighty Mouse, since the crew was too stupid to determine the brains were switched back. Harry then screams at the crew to fly the ship to Humongo. Upon arriving, the crew beams the duo down (although the member beams himself down first by accident).

While Pearl speaks with Muss, the king of Humongo, on her fears that Harry might steal the Doomsday Device, he reassures her that the Device is safe because it is under the utmost security. Unbeknownst to him, everything he speaks about, Harry and Swifty are discovering the loopholes for each obstacle. The door to the Device's vault is locked by a tempered-steel lock, but the giant mice of Humongo ever so stupidly keep a spare key under the welcome mat, which Harry finds. The Device is also guarded by guard dogs, but Harry and Swifty sneak in after the horn blows, and the dogs clock out. The Device is also guarded by the King's secret service, but the guard on duty falls for Harry's trick, assuming the note written is genuinely written by his mother, Matilda. Originally, Harry wrote the name Mildred, but after the guard points out the name is Matilda, Harry changes the name, and the guard runs off, asking Harry to watch the Doomsday Device for him.

The vault itself is made of a thick coating of magnesium titanium alloy, the strongest metal known. Harry and Swifty activate the machine in the package Swifty was carrying the whole time, a sound amplification machine that transforms the howls of three alley cats into ultrasonic rays that shatter the vault. When the vault bursts from the meowing of the cats, an alarm goes off, and a guard lets the king know somebody broke into the vault. However, when the vault cracks open, the Device is not inside; instead, Mighty Mouse is revealed to be holding a pile of fish. Swifty tries to alert Harry of Mighty Mouse's presence, but Harry cannot hear him over the noise. Mighty Mouse throws the fish at the cats, which they catch, and run off, and then informs Harry himself of his presence. After a battle inside the machine, Harry orders the crew to beam the duo aboard, and while they do, the duo returns all mixed up. Pearl, the King, and the Humongo Police Force arrive at the vault and see Mighty Mouse inside in, and they jump to conclusions. Pearl subsequently arrests Mighty Mouse on behalf of the ISF, and he goes peacefully, stating he would be the absolute last one to resist the authority of law and order. Pearl and the police who cuff Mighty Mouse are crying.

At the trial, King Muss (acting as judge), declares a recess before proceeding with the case of Humongo vs. Mighty Mouse, but he just jumps rope a few times and then says that recess is over. Pearl gives her testimony to the king, and Mighty Mouse defends himself. Meanwhile, Harry is listening in on the trial, and hears Mighty Mouse explain that he himself broke into the vault and launched the Device into space, so that Harry couldn't steal it. Harry then plans to intercept the Device by means of his portable shuttle craft. King Muss rules Mighty Mouse not guilty and dismisses the case, but Harry intercepts the Device and replaces it with a time-ticking booby trap set to explode. Mighty Mouse's super-hearing picks up on the ticking, and he launches the booby trap back into space. It explodes when it reaches Harry's shuttle craft, but Harry had parked inside the catship at that point, so he still has the Device. Mighty Mouse apologizes to the king for the lack of a Doomsday Device, and promises to bring it back. Pearl and her crew join him.

After getting the package containing the Doomsday Device open, Harry complains about the fact that it is a kit, requiring two D-cell batteries, so he and his crew have to put it together themselves. Harry asks for the instructions, and Swifty gives him what he thinks are the instructions, but it ends up being a map of San Diego's interstate highway system (unbeknownst to Harry and Swifty). Meanwhile, the crew inform him that Mighty Mouse has been spotted, so Harry sets a huge mouse trap that turns invisible to catch him. The trap also could have come with racing stripes according to Harry. As Mighty Mouse flies into the trap, Harry's crew finish assembling the device, but when he tries to activate it to suck up Pearl's ship, the device explodes instead, leaving a trail of radioactive debris that the mouse ship's scanners pick up. However, the scanners lost contact with Mighty Mouse because he is in the trap.

As Mighty Mouse frees himself from the trap, Harry fumes at Swifty for losing the instructions, as well as discovering that what he thought were the instructions was a map, even ignoring his crew's report that they have lost all control of the ship, and that it's headed on a crash course to the planet U-turn. Pearl's scanners pick up on this and the mouse ship follows the cat ship. Eventually, Harry finds the instructions inside a birdcage, and when Swifty asks him to do something about the crash, he freaks out as the ship crashes. Deciding there's no point in just wincing over Swifty and his crew, Harry decides to enslave the mice of U-turn, who still live in the era and style of the Stone Age, complete with dinosaurs and prehistoric life forms. Pearl points this out to her first mate, also advising, "Don't drink the water."

Harry meets three mice of U-turn, Ug, Mug, and Reginald Algernon Whitecap III. When asking about why he's the third, Reginald replies, "My parents wanted a girl". All the mice fume at Harry ordering them to repair his ship, pointing out the planet is a democracy. Harry then "votes for himself" while using a laser to destroy a national monument, and the mice shiver in fear, proceeding to repair the ship. Harry also rallies them to fight against Mighty Mouse, using the classic battle cry "Remember the Alamo!"

Pearl and her first mate walk into an Eyesaurus (a dinosaur with three eyes), thinking it is a cave. When the first mate notices it's a dinosaur, Pearl summons Mighty Mouse with the Save Our Necklace, and Mighty Mouse comes to the rescue, abandoning his job of picking up the debris by hand. After freeing them, the first mate runs back to the ship, but Mighty Mouse and Pearl are captured by the mice of U-turn, and Pearl comments that Harry brainwashed them into believing Mighty Mouse murdered Davy Crockett. Harry and Swifty rush back to the ship and take off for their secret lair, and off-screen Mighty Mouse makes things right with the mice. Pearl and her crew take off while Mighty Mouse gives the mice a crash course in agriculture, powering a machine by forcing the same Eyesaurus to run on a treadmill for hours on end.

Upon arriving at the secret lair, Harry and Swifty use a "Build-O-Matic" to build the Doomsday Device, and it is finished correctly. He tries to use it to suck up Mighty Mouse and Pearl, but nothing happens because the machine doesn't have one ounce of "hipporanium", the most unstable element in the galaxy. Since Mighty Mouse is the only one knowing where it is at, Harry has to abandon using his "Starkers" (white sharks with eyes that pop up) to eat the duo, and Pearl (who was writing a will) falls down to the ground with Mighty Mouse. Having been put to sleep by a "Venusian Sludge Wart", Mighty Mouse awakens upon hitting the ground. Harry then employs his friend Matta Furri, the greatest spy in the universe, to lure Mighty Mouse into a trap by getting romantic with him. He then lets her know the location of the last ounce of hipporanium left, and Harry overhears this on the intercom. Pearl rescues Mighty Mouse (even shouting his signature line of "Here I come to save the day!") from Matta Furri, but the log she was using to charge through the door avoids Matta (who ducks) and instead hits Mighty Mouse, leading him to think Matta's kiss knocked him out, which he accidentally admits whilst Pearl is interrogating Matta.

The cat crew flies to the location of Star Coordinates 66Z-1776 Omega, and it ends up being a toy store, Toys We Is. The toymaker and shop owner is in the process of stocking Santa Claus's Christmas presents for him, even demonstrating a Fat Albert jack-in-the-box, but Harry throws him out of the store and forces the toymaker to abide by his demands. Infuriated, Santa plans to inform the Tooth Fairy of what just happened.

Mighty Mouse allows Pearl to know the location, but she doesn't want to believe him at first. The last ounce of hipporanium is included as a sample in Mr. Whizzbang's Super Deluxe Chemistry Set (called "Dr. Whizzbang's Fizz Fizz Chemistry Set" on the box), which the toymaker under pressure gives Harry. Harry also steals some ant farms to unleash on Pearl's ship, because the ants are martian metal-eating ants. Upon releasing the ants, they start to eat at Pearl's ship, getting as far one last bit of the roof, forcing the whole crew to stand on it. Mighty Mouse saves them by creating a picnic, which the ants can't resist, and Pearl reveals that since they always carry a spare, she rebuilds the ship by stomping on a buzzer. It regenerates and the crew falls back in.

Harry, broadcasting live to the whole universe, reveals his demands. All mice are to bow to him and call him "Your Majesty", or any variant thereof; he also wants to come home to a hot meal every day after work, and he wants everything in the entire universe to be his, except for a toy train set which Swifty wants. He gives the mice only five seconds to surrender, but when Pearl calls to tell him that nobody will obey him, he makes good of his threat to use the Doomsday Device to suck up everything and starts to do so.

Pearl and Mighty Mouse watch a special news bulletin, learning that Harry is doing this, when the Device sucks up the anchor giving the report. It gets all the planets and even the sun. It eventually gets Mighty Mouse, causing the mouse crew to freak out. Harry gives Pearl one last chance to surrender, and proceeds to suck up the mouse ship, but Mighty Mouse finds the edge of the device, puts a hole in it with his super strength, and pulls the reverse lever (after Swifty fails to stop him). The machine spits out everything, leading it all to go back into its proper places. It also spits out rocks at the mouse ship, which prompts Mighty Mouse to relocate the ship into a safe spot; only the problem is that the spot is a no parking zone.

Mighty Mouse gets the catship to open its "mouth" and sticks the nozzle into the port, making it too windy for Harry and Swifty to move. He flies inside the ship, gives the cats one last speech, and flips the switch back to the "ON" position. He escapes, the Device subsequently sucks up the catship (and burps), and Mighty Mouse declares the battle is won. He then discovers a tow truck is towing the mouse ship and tries to persuade the driver to forgive the fine due to circumstances. The driver refuses, and Pearl announces that she will pay the ticket.

Later, a parade is held to celebrate the victory, and the Device's nozzle is tied in a knot, forever trapping the cats inside, leaving the aforementioned dog squad to pursue them. Pearl blows Mighty Mouse a kiss, and he blushes as the parade continues. Harry also appears to state that he will be back, but he gets pushed away by the screen.

== History ==
Star Wars mania was strong in 1982 with The Empire Strikes Back and the upcoming Return of the Jedi. Filmation wanted to cash in, so they took the serialized Mighty Mouse story "The Great Space Chase" from The New Adventures of Mighty Mouse and Heckle & Jeckle Saturday morning series and made it into a movie.

With the tagline The cartoon superhero in his first feature film, the film was not the hit Filmation wanted, and the film was re-released as a kids' matinee film. The film, released twice on VHS, is out of print. The movie poster for the film, and the film itself, are rare, and are sought after as collectibles. CBS Home Entertainment has not yet released Mighty Mouse in the Great Space Chase on DVD or Blu-ray.
