= Airplane II: The Sequel =

1982 American parody film by Ken Finkleman

- Theatrical release poster
- Directed by: Ken Finkleman
- Written by: Ken Finkleman
- Produced by: Howard W. Koch
- Starring: Robert Hays; Julie Hagerty; Lloyd Bridges; Chad Everett; William Shatner
- Cinematography: Joe Biroc
- Edited by: Dennis Virkler; Tina Hirsch
- Music by: Elmer Bernstein; Richard Hazard
- Production company: Howard W. Koch Productions
- Distributed by: Paramount Pictures
- Release date: December 10, 1982
- Running time: 84 minutes
- Country: United States
- Language: English
- Budget: $15 million
- Box office: $27.2 million

Airplane II: The Sequel (titled Flying High II: The Sequel in Australia, New Zealand, South Africa, Japan, and the Philippines) is a 1982 American science fiction comedy film written and directed by Ken Finkleman in his directorial debut and starring Robert Hays, Julie Hagerty, Lloyd Bridges, Chad Everett, William Shatner, Rip Torn, and Sonny Bono. A sequel to the 1980 film Airplane!, it was released on December 10, 1982.

The team who wrote and directed the original Airplane! (Jim Abrahams, David Zucker, and Jerry Zucker) had no involvement with this sequel. Paramount, having faced a similar situation with Grease 2 earlier in that year, hired Finkleman, who wrote Grease 2, to write and direct Airplane II as well. Ultimately, the film received mixed reviews from critics and was a commercial disappointment, grossing $27.2 million against a $15 million budget. A third film, Airplane III, was announced in a post-credit message, but was cancelled due to the film's lackluster performance.

== Plot ==
Sometime in the near future, the Moon has been colonized and supports a station on its surface. The XR-2300 lunar shuttle, known as Mayflower One, is being rushed to launch from Houston for its inaugural commercial flight. The head of the ground crew, The Sarge, does not like what is occurring, but he defers to airline management. Meanwhile, in the terminal, the head of the space center, Bud Kruger, argues with the commissioner about the spacecraft's still-pending government approval, explaining that the ship failed to meet safety regulations, but the commissioner stresses that “the board” is under pressure to keep the launch on schedule.

The ship's computer officer, Elaine Dickinson, expresses her concerns about the shuttle's poor test results, but her fiancé Simon Kurtz, a member of the flight crew, reminds her that the reports were filed by her former lover, Ted Striker, a test pilot who lost his credibility after suffering a mental breakdown. Having been committed to the Ronald Reagan Hospital for the Mentally Ill after a lawsuit following a test flight that Ted piloted and in which the lunar shuttle crashed, Ted reads a newspaper headline about the imminent shuttle launch, concluding that his hospitalization was meant to silence him regarding dangerous safety issues related to the lunar shuttle. Although he has post-traumatic stress disorder resulting from his actions in "The War" – specifically the loss of his entire squadron above "Macho Grande" – resulting in a relapse of his "drinking problem", he crash-landed a commercial 707 airplane in 1980, on which Elaine was a flight attendant. Later that evening, he escapes from the asylum, determined to save her and the other passengers.

Ted encounters Elaine just before she boards and declares that the shuttle must be stopped, but she declines. Although the flight is full, he buys a ticket from a scalper and boards the spacecraft. As Captain Clarence Oveur, navigator/co-pilot Unger, and first officer/flight engineer Dunn prepare the shuttle for takeoff, he tries to persuade her to terminate the mission. Once airborne, Ted takes his seat and details the court hearing that ensued from his complaints about the lunar shuttle to his elderly seatmate. At the trial, Simon blamed Ted's incompetence for the shuttle test crash, but Ted insisted the plane was a "flying death trap," and survivors from the 707 crash landing testified to Ted's heroism.

Back in the cockpit, the crew discovers the spaceship's core is overheating due to a short circuit, and Elaine realizes the artificially intelligent computer system, R.O.K., is overriding her orders. While attempting to rewire the system and extinguish a fire, Dunn and Unger are blown out of the airlock. Thrown off course, the ship enters an asteroid field headed toward the Sun. The insurgent computer system releases gas through cockpit vents, which kills Captain Oveur and leaves Elaine to pilot the runaway vessel alone. After Simon abandons Elaine and escapes in the sole escape pod, air traffic controller Steve McCroskey reveals that passenger Joe Seluchi had boarded with a briefcase containing a time bomb that he had purchased at a gift shop, intent on committing suicide to provide an insurance payout for his wife. Just before the ship reaches the Sun, Ted manages to wrestle the bomb from Joe, detonates ROK with it, and successfully regains manual control of the ship, setting course for the Moon as originally intended.

As ROK's destruction has caused collateral damage to the shuttle, the flight is not yet out of danger. En route to the Moon, flight control shifts to the Alpha Beta Lunar Base, headed by Commander Buck Murdock, one of Ted's wartime comrades. Contemptuous of Ted because of Macho Grande, he nonetheless agrees to help and attempts to talk Ted through the landing process, but the ship approaches the Moon too quickly. As a last resort, Ted jams Elaine's hair pin into the control panel, shorting the system and destroying the auxiliary engines, and the ship crashes through the base, safely landing on the Moon's surface. As the passengers frantically evacuate, Ted and Elaine passionately embrace each other and are eventually married.

== Cast ==
- Robert Hays as Ted Striker
- Julie Hagerty as Elaine Dickinson
- Lloyd Bridges as Steve McCroskey
- Chad Everett as Simon Kurtz
- Peter Graves as Captain Clarence Oveur
- Rip Torn as Bud Kruger
- John Dehner as The Commissioner
- Chuck Connors as The Sarge
- Richard Jaeckel as Controller #2
- Stephen Stucker as Jacobs / Courtroom Clerk
- Kent McCord as Unger
- James A. Watson Jr. as Dunn
- Wendy Phillips as Mary
- Laurene Landon as Testa
- Sonny Bono as The Bomber ("Joe Seluchi")
- William Shatner as Commander Buck Murdock
- Raymond Burr as Judge D.L. Simonton
- John Vernon as Dr. Stone
- James Noble as Father O'Flanagan
- John Larch as Prosecuting Attorney
- Lee Bryant as Mrs. Hammen
- Oliver Robins as Jimmy Wilson
- David Paymer as Court photographer
- Rick Overton as Clerk
- Leon Askin as Moscow anchorman
- Art Fleming as Game Show Host
- Frank Ashmore as Controller #3
- Pat Sajak as Buffalo anchorman
- Louise Sorel as Nurse
- Sandahl Bergman as Officer #1 (Lieutenant White)
- Michael Currie as Businessman #1
- Howard Honig as Dave Walters
- Lee Patterson as Phoenix Six Captain
- Jack Jones as Lounge Singer
- Hervé Villechaize as Little Breather

== Production ==
Most of the first film's cast agreed to return for the film while Jerry Zucker, Jim Abrahams, and David Zucker were involved in the early stages of development, and considered a sequel but eventually passed on it. However, Abrahams and the Zuckers decided to make the television series Police Squad! instead, starring Leslie Nielsen from the original movie, and publicly distanced themselves from the sequel during its marketing.

Filming began June 2, 1982, in Los Angeles and lasted eight weeks, with double the budget of the first film.

== Music ==
Much of the movie's background music had been taken from the original TV series Battlestar Galactica. (Actor Lloyd Bridges, who played Steve McCroskey in the film, also played Commander Cain in Battlestar Galactica, and Kent McCord, who played Unger in the film, also played Captain Troy in the Battlestar Galactica spin-off series, Galactica 1980.)

== Reception ==
On review aggregator website Rotten Tomatoes, the film holds an approval rating of 43% based on 23 reviews. On Metacritic, the film has a weighted average score of 48 out of 100 based on nine critics, indicating "mixed or average" reviews.

Variety said Airplane II was "far worse" than the original and "might seem funnier had there been no original". Roger Ebert gave the film two out of four stars, praising the opening scenes but saying it "never really seems to know whether it's about a spaceship. It's all sight gags, one-liners, puns, funny signs and scatological cross-references".

Airplane II opened in the United States the same weekend as The Toy and 48 Hrs. and finished second for the weekend behind The Toy with a gross of $5,329,208 from 1,150 screens. Grosses dropped 45% the following week and the film went on to earn only $27.2 million in the United States and Canada, compared to the original's $83 million box office total.

== Cancelled sequel ==
A third film, Airplane III, was announced in a post-credit message. Paramount had informed the creative team of the second film of the plan to do a third one, but eventually cancelled those plans due to the weak box-office reception the second one got. In 2011, Robert Hays said in an interview that the project was very close to being made, but that he was never interested in a third one.
