= Michael Currie (actor) =

American actor

- Michael Currie in Sudden Impact
- Born: Herman Christian Schwenk Jr. July 24, 1928; Kingston, New York, U.S.
- Died: December 22, 2009 (aged 81); Freeport, Maine, U.S.
- Occupation: Actor
- Years active: 1964–2002

Michael Currie (born Herman Christian Schwenk Jr.; July 24, 1928 – December 22, 2009) was an American actor who appeared in several films and on television. Born in Kingston, New York to Herman C. Schwenk and Mabel Lockwood, he began his career in 1964.

He had roles in several Clint Eastwood movies including the comedy film Any Which Way You Can (1980) and Firefox (1982). He also played Lt. Donnelly in the fourth installment of the "Dirty Harry" film series Sudden Impact (1983), and reprised his role as Capt. Donnelly in the 1988 sequel The Dead Pool.

Currie had roles in the horror films Dead & Buried (1981) and Halloween III: Season of the Witch (1982). His other film appearances included Loving Couples (1980), Airplane II: The Sequel (1982), Starflight: The Plane That Couldn't Land (1983), The Philadelphia Experiment (1984), Distant Thunder (1988), The Man Without a Face (1993) and G.I. Jane (1997).

Currie starred in the 1960s television show Dark Shadows as Sheriff Jonas Carter. He has made guest appearances on many TV shows. Other television programs on which he appeared include Lou Grant, MASH, Barney Miller, Cheers, Homicide: Life on the Street and Law & Order. Currie died on December 22, 2009.

== Filmography ==
Year	Title	Role	Notes
1964	The Troublemaker	Electrical Inspector	
1980	Loving Couples	Ken	
1980	Any Which Way You Can	Wyoming Officer	with Clint Eastwood
1981	Dead & Buried	Herman	
1982	Firefox	Captain Seerbacker	with Clint Eastwood
1982	Halloween III: Season of the Witch	Rafferty	
1982	Airplane II: The Sequel	Businessman #1	
1983	Sudden Impact	Lieutenant Donnelly	with Clint Eastwood
1984	The Philadelphia Experiment	Magnussen	
1988	The Dead Pool	Captain Donnelly	with Clint Eastwood
1988	Distant Thunder	Coach Swabey	
1993	The Man Without a Face	Mr. Cameron, General Store Owner	
1997	G.I. Jane	Commission Speaker	
