= List of domestic workers =

This list of domestic workers contains people who have worked as household servants or staff who have become notable, either for their domestic work career or for a subsequent career in another field, such as writing or art.

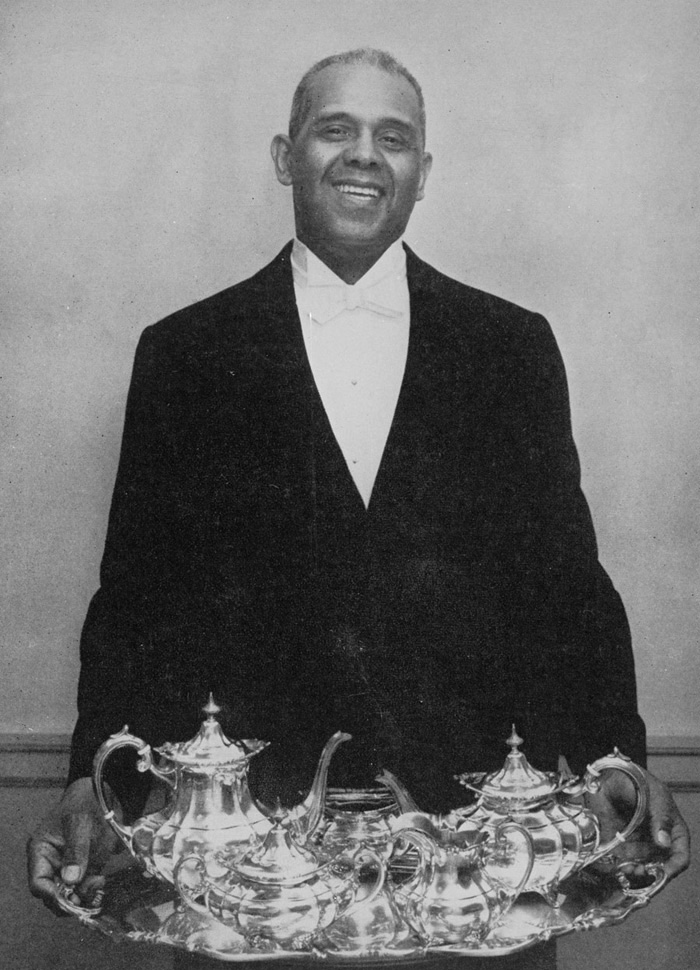
Alonzo Fields, butler at the White House

- Abdul Karim (the Munshi), servant of Queen Victoria of Great Britain
- Céleste Albaret, housekeeper of Marcel Proust
- Gladys Aylward, maid, afterwards missionary
- Alice Ayres, nursemaid honoured for her bravery in rescuing the children in her care from a house fire
- Sarah Balabagan
- Francis Barber with Samuel Johnson became residual heir.
- Fonzworth Bentley
- Emily Blatchley, governess and missionary
- Dorothy Bolden, domestic worker, community activist and President of the National Domestic Workers Union - Atlanta, Georgia
- Sophie Brzeska, governess and writer
- Paul Burrell, butler to Diana, Princess of Wales
- Elizabeth Canning, maidservant in London
- Princess Caraboo (Mary Baker), English imposter
- Flor Contemplacion, executed for murder
- Elizabeth Cotten, musician, working for Charles Seeger the ethnomusicologist
- Hannah Cullwick, maid to A. J. Munby
- Lisette Denison Forth, maid and philanthropist
- Terezija Dush, Venetian Slovene herder, servant, nanny, and Marian seeres
- Alonzo Fields, butler at the White House
- Caroline Herschel, astronomer (worked as a domestic servant in her father's household until his death)
- Paul Hogan, butler
- Bridget Holmes, chambermaid to kings of England
- Hélène Jégado, serial killer
- Dora Lee Jones, trade unionist
- Anna Leonowens, governess to the children of the King of Siam
- Thérèse Levasseur, laundress and chambermaid
- Margaret Maher, maid to Emily Dickinson
- Moa Martinson, author of proletarian literature, kitchen maid
- Ellen More (floruit circa 1500–1535), an African servant at the Scottish court
- Ruth Mott, a servant and television cook
- Notburga, German saint, patron of hired hands
- Papin sisters, murderers
- Lillian Rogers Parks, housemaid and seamstress in the White House
- Rose Porteous, Lang Hancock's maid (afterwards his wife)
- Margaret Powell, maid and writer
- Isabel Grenfell Quallo, domestic worker and community activist
- Casimira Rodríguez, trade unionist and politician
- Margaret Rogers, maid at the White House
- Charles Spence, Scottish poet, stonemason and footman
- Deb Willet, maid in the household of Samuel Pepys
