= Raleigh DeGeer Amyx =

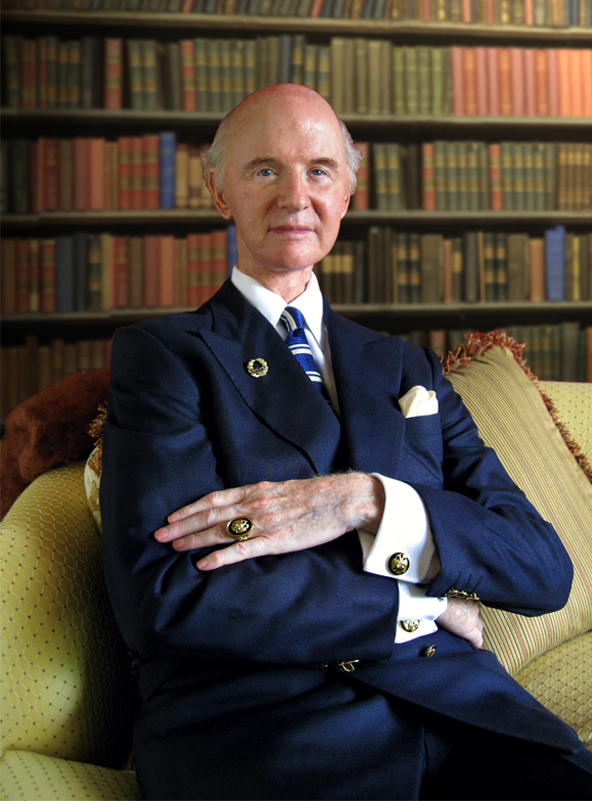
- Raleigh DeGeer Amyx in his library, October 2011
- Born: June 14, 1938; Kansas City, Kansas, U.S.
- Died: June 30, 2019 (aged 81)
- Occupations: Historian; collector
- Known for: Collector of historical memorabilia
- Website: The Raleigh DeGeer Amyx collection

Raleigh DeGeer Amyx (June 14, 1938 – June 30, 2019) was an American collector of Presidential, Americana, military, sports, NASA, and Olympic artifacts, including gold, silver and bronze winners medals presented to athletes.

== Early life, education ==
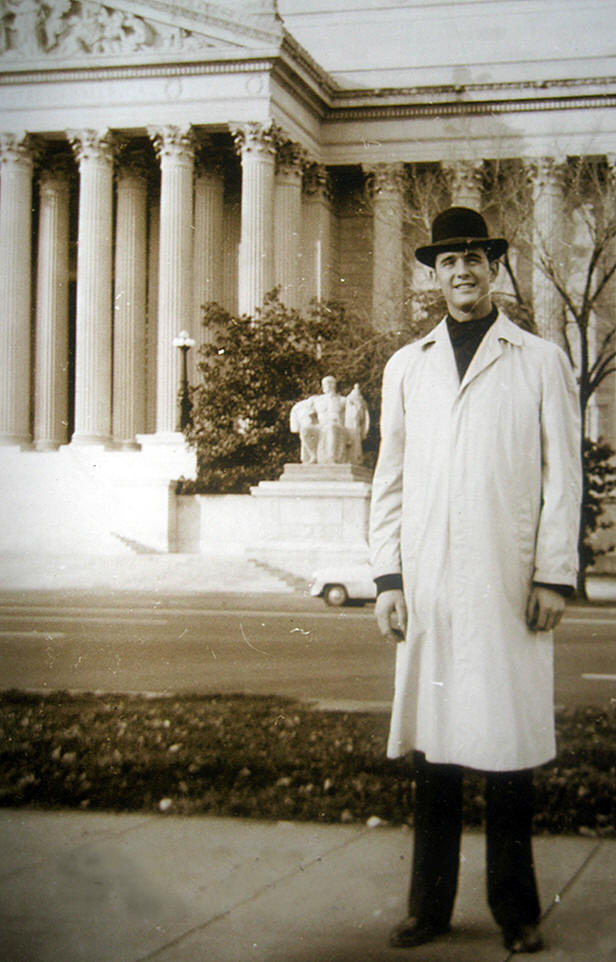
Raleigh Degeer Amyx with the FBI in 1957

Amyx was born in 1938 in Kansas City, Kansas, and later moved to St. Louis, Missouri, where he resided during the World War II years. In 1945, his father, Eugene Raleigh Amyx, accepted a transfer by his employer Johnson & Johnson, to Louisville, Kentucky. There, Raleigh was raised until his graduation from Atherton High School.

== Career ==
Amyx served in the U.S. Army and worked at the FBI. At one time, he served in the Investigation Division, which included the kidnapping and sexual slavery units. He served as a messenger to FBI Director J. Edgar Hoover. In 1957, Hoover presented an inscribed and signed sepia-toned photo to Amyx. In about the same time, Amyx was asked by the Director's Office to take a message to the then Majority Leader of the United States Senate, Lyndon B. Johnson, and then to Senator John F. Kennedy. While in the Senate Office with Kennedy, Amyx asked him to inscribe and sign a photograph, to which he obliged.

Later Amyx became an Association Executive, overseeing and co-authoring the Gymnastics Safety Manual. Following a near-fatal bout with throat cancer, Amyx founded American Heritage Manuscripts and Collectibles.

== Collector ==
Amyx claimed he started collecting at age seven, when he "opened" a museum consisting of some coins, stamps, butterflies and a dead bat. Admission was 2 cents. Amyx's large private collection as an adult is specialized in Presidential, Sports, Military, and NASA collectibles, particularly those owned and used by famous Americans.

=== Presidential collection ===
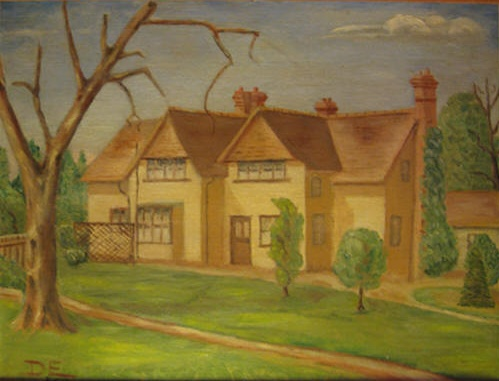
A photograph of the painting Eisenhower did of Telegraph Cottage where he lived during WWII

In the early 1980s, Amyx claimed he saw Backstairs at the White House, a television mini-series adapted from the book My Thirty Years Backstairs at the White House by Lillian Rogers Parks, who had been a housekeeper and seamstress at the White House for thirty years. Amyx was inspired to gather mementos from former White House employees into a collection, and placed numerous advertisements in The Washington Post. One response said, "You don't know who to leave all this stuff to. You'd be out on a walk with the president and he would say 'Here's a little something for you'... We took it for granted in those days. It was just work. Now it's history." Amyx has stated he recognized the historical importance of both the items and the stories, and gathered signed provenance letters from each contributor to authenticate the items. Amyx has since worked with some 100 people who have held long-term household positions for First Families since the days of Herbert Hoover, and some whose parents and/or grandparents served in the White House as far back as the 19th century.

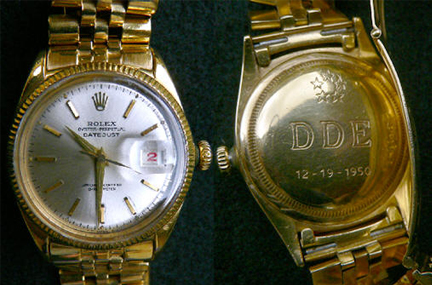
Dwight Eisenhower's Rolex watch, from the Raleigh DeGeer Amyx Collection

His official White House china collection ranks as the world's second-largest privately owned such collection. One piece from the collection was traded to Robert L. McNeil and is featured in the book American Presidential China. Another item in the collection is President Dwight D. Eisenhower's Rolex Datejust, which is the 150,000th officially certified Rolex Chronometer made. This watch was featured in Jake's Rolex World magazine.

=== Sports collection ===
Amyx had a collection of sports collectibles relating to baseball, football, boxing, horse racing and the Olympics. Amyx possesses three official Super Bowl rings presented to Washington Redskins players in 1982, 1987 and 1991.

Olympic memorabilia

According to the Olympian Collectors Club, his Olympic Medal and memorabilia collection ranks within the top four collections in the world. His collection includes over 50 Olympic medals in gold, silver, and bronze dating back to 1896. He is a member of the International Society of Olympic Historians, with research interests in the Olympic Movement, Olympic history, promotion of Olympic Games, and Olympic gymnastics.

=== Media presence ===
Amyx acquired, authenticated, and appraised historical items for collectors and for entities such as the Smithsonian Institution. Portions of the Raleigh DeGeer Amyx Presidential collection have been exhibited at the Ronald Reagan Presidential Library and the Herbert Hoover Presidential Library and Museum.

He made national television appearances, such as on Good Morning America. His collection was filmed by ABC. In addition to TV, a number of newspaper and book references have mentioned him and his collection. Auction companies, such as RR Auction, have also published articles and videos featuring Raleigh DeGeer Amyx.
