= Frances Spatz Leighton =

American author (1919–2007)

- Born: Frances Ornstein; September 4, 1919; Geauga County, Ohio, U.S.
- Died: April 6, 2007 (aged 87)
- Known for: Writer, ghostwriter

Frances Spatz Leighton (born Frances Ornstein; September 4, 1919 – April 6, 2007) was an American author, ghostwriter, and journalist. She ghostwrote several memoirs and accounts of Washington D. C. life, writing over 30 books, including My Thirty Years Backstairs at the White House (1961) and My Life with Jacqueline Kennedy (1969). She was born in Ohio and attended Ohio State University, but did not graduate. Leighton soon moved to Washington, D.C., where she worked as a journalist for several publications, including The American Weekly. She ghostwrote her first memoir in 1957, of a chef for the President of the United States.

== Biography ==
=== Early life ===
Frances Ornstein was born on a dairy farm in Geauga County, Ohio, on September 4, 1919. Her parents were Bertha Schwartzstein, and Joseph Ornstein, a Polish-born Jew. She had one sister, Rose, who died at age 27, and one brother, Jack, who became a professor of modern languages and linguistics at the University of Texas at El Paso.

Ornstein went to the local Thompson High School, graduating in 1937. Ornstein attended Ohio State University for several years but dropped out shortly before her graduation. While at Ohio State, she was a member of the Verse Writer's Guild of Ohio, hosted a show on the college's radio station and wrote poetry. At the time her goal in life was "to conduct a newspaper, poetry and philosophy column." After dropping out, Ornstein moved to Washington, D.C.

=== Career ===
In Washington, Leighton found initial employment writing as a freelancer for the Metro Sunday Group and other publications. She also worked as a contributing editor to Family Weekly and Washington editor of This Week. Her articles covered topics such as a woman who claimed to have "prayed herself thin", the keeper of the Great Seal of the United States, and a student at Georgetown University who had been a freshman for twelve years. Leighton was working for the International News Service before The American Weekly hired her in 1950. She worked there until the magazine closed in 1958.

The first book she ghostwrote was published in 1957, after The American Weekly gave her an assignment to write a profile of François Rysavy, Dwight D. Eisenhower's chef. Leighton came up with White House Chef which was described as "chatty and surprisingly candid" and selected for preservation in an underground vault by the Library of Congress. In 1959 she collaborated with Jane Barkley, the wife of Alben W. Barkley, to write White House Menus and Recipes.

After working on several books, from 1962 to 1965 she published none, working instead on magazine articles. In 1962 she was the Washington editor of Good Housekeeping and contributing to the Ladies' Home Journal and The Week. By 1969 Leighton had been involved in ghostwriting 16 books. In a profile published that year, The New York Times described her as "one of those people one occasionally meets whose unflagging energy and overwhelming bounce make you feel desperately in need of a nap." It continued to say that she knew "absolutely everything about and everybody in Washington." She told the paper that "I think I'm just hung up on living other people's lives" in response to a question about why she chose to ghostwrite so many books. It took her round three months to write an average book and by 1969 she was approached frequently with requests to ghostwrite memoirs. Around the same time, Leighton began contributing to Mid-South Magazine.

In 1976, she began working to ghostwrite a book by William Miller about his time as Doorkeeper of the United States House of Representatives. The book was published the following year. She co-wrote with John Szostak In The Footsteps of John Paul II (1980), June Allyson's eponymous memoir in 1982 and a biography of Nancy Reagan, The Search for the Real Nancy Reagan, in 1987.

For the memoirs that she wrote, Leighton earned the nicknames "Queen of Female Ghosts", "The 'Ghost' of Washington", and "Washington's classiest ghost".

=== Personal life ===
Leighton was married for six years to a staffer for Earle Clements. By 1969, she was described as a "divorcee". In February 1984, she married Kendall King Hoyt (d. 2001), a retired Air Force colonel.

Leighton was an amateur painter and gave lectures in her later life. She died in Arlington, Virginia, on April 6, 2007, aged 87, of heart failure. Her will established a trust to divide money between the town of Thompson and the Ledgemont School District to improve the local library.

== Notable works ==
Leighton wrote several books of her own and was involved in the publication of over 30 books. She wrote a fictional children's book called The Memoirs of Senator Brown, a Capitol Cat, about a cat who was elected to serve in Congress.

=== My Thirty Years Backstairs at the White House ===
Lillian Rogers Parks worked as a housemaid and seamstress in the White House for 30 years, from 1929 during the Presidency of Herbert Hoover to 1961 during the Presidency of Dwight D. Eisenhower. Her mother, Maggie Rogers, had worked at the White House in a similar capacity from 1909 to 1939. Leighton worked with Parks to write My Thirty Years Backstairs at the White House (1961) about her experiences working at the White House and as a child while her mother was. After the book's publication, First Lady of the United States Jacqueline Kennedy had her staff sign an agreement to not publish memoirs. The book was very successful, spending 36 weeks on The New York Times Best Seller list, selling over 600,000 copies and spawning a 1979 NBC mini-series, Backstairs at the White House.

=== I Married a Psychiatrist ===
In 1962 Citadel Press published I Married a Psychiatrist. Leighton told the press that the idea for the book came when she was walking her Border Collie, named "Tiger Lil" and walked by a neighbor who was a psychiatrist, Frank Caprio. She wrote the book from a story told by Louise Pfister, the wife of Caprio's wife. After meeting him, Leighton said that his psychiatric advice "changed my life". In 1965 Paramount Pictures announced that it was working on a $2 million movie adaptation of the book, to be directed by George Sidney. Debbie Reynolds was signed to star in the film in early 1966, but plans for the film were shelved after Reynolds got into a fight with the producers.

=== My Life with Jacqueline Kennedy ===
Mary Barelli Gallagher worked as the personal secretary for Jacqueline Kennedy from 1957 to 1964. She wrote a 700-page autobiographical memoir, initially not intending to publish it. When Gallagher decided that she wanted her stories to be published, she approached Leighton through the National Press Club. The two spent around six months revising the manuscript into a 396-page book that was published as My Life with Jacqueline Kennedy in 1969 to generally negative reviews. The New York Times called the book "a worm's-eye view of history commercially packaged by a backstairs ghost" and noted that Gallagher provided "the venom" and "details" to Leighton, who "blended them together with the precision of a hack." Through the process, Gallagher and Leighton became friends and would remain as such until Leighton's death.

== Partial bibliography ==
- Allyson, June; Leighton, Frances Spatz (1983). June Allyson. New York: Berkley Books. ISBN 978-0-425-06251-7. OCLC 9789359.
- Rysavy, François; Leighton, Frances Spatz (1957). White House chef. New York: Putnam. OCLC 1320792.
- Parks, Lillian Rogers; Leighton, Frances Spatz (1961). My Thirty Years Backstairs at the White House. New York: Fleet Publishing Corporation. ISBN 978-0-923891-96-1. OCLC 1037186645.
- Pfister, Louise; Leighton, Frances Spatz (1963). I married a psychiatrist. New York: Dell. OCLC 873296647.
- Rhea, Mini; Leighton, Frances Spatz (1963). I was Jacqueline Kennedy's dressmaker. New York: Popular Library. OCLC 3463453.
- Patty Goes to Washington. New York: Ace Books. 1964., an original TV tie-in novel based on The Patty Duke Show
- The memoirs of Senator Brown, a Capitol cat. New York: Fleet. 1965. OCLC 5714965.
- Gallagher, Mary Barelli; Leighton, Frances Spatz (1970). My Life with Jacqueline Kennedy. London: Joseph. ISBN 978-0-7181-0776-5. OCLC 558729625.
- A treasury of White House cooking. New York: Putnam. 1972. OCLC 1029564675.
- Miller, William; Leighton, Frances Spatz (1978). Fishbait: the memoirs of the congressional doorkeeper. New York: Warner Books. ISBN 978-0-446-81637-3. OCLC 3935990.
- Szostak, John M; Leighton, Frances Spatz (1980). In the footsteps of Pope John Paul II: an intimate personal portrait. Englewood Cliffs, N.J.: Prentice-Hall. OCLC 893972389.
- The search for the real Nancy Reagan. New York: Macmillan. 1987. ISBN 978-0-02-570210-3. OCLC 242162116.
- Collier, Oscar; Leighton, Frances Spatz (1997). How to write and sell your first novel. Cincinnati, OH: Writer's Digest Books. ISBN 978-0-89879-770-1. OCLC 994017827.
