= Jackie (2016 film) =

2016 film by Pablo Larraín

- Theatrical release poster
- Directed by: Pablo Larraín
- Written by: Noah Oppenheim
- Produced by: Juan de Dios Larraín; Darren Aronofsky; Mickey Liddell; Scott Franklin; Ari Handel
- Starring: Natalie Portman; Peter Sarsgaard; Greta Gerwig; Billy Crudup; John Hurt
- Cinematography: Stéphane Fontaine
- Edited by: Sebastián Sepúlveda
- Music by: Mica Levi
- Production companies: LD Entertainment; Wild Bunch; Protozoa Pictures; Fábula; Why Not Productions; Endemol Shine Studios; Bliss Media
- Distributed by: Fox Searchlight Pictures (United States); BAC Films (France); Diamond Films (Chile)
- Release dates: September 7, 2016 (Venice); January 27, 2017 (United States); February 1, 2017 (France); February 16, 2017 (Chile)
- Running time: 100 minutes
- Countries: United States; France; Chile
- Language: English
- Budget: $9 million
- Box office: $36.6 million

Jackie is a 2016 historical drama film directed by Pablo Larraín and written by Noah Oppenheim. The film stars Natalie Portman as Jacqueline Kennedy. Peter Sarsgaard, Greta Gerwig, Billy Crudup, and John Hurt also star; it was Hurt's final film released in his lifetime before his death in January 2017. It is the first film in Larraín's trilogy of iconic 20th century women, succeeded by Spencer (2021) and Maria (2024). The film follows Kennedy in the days when she was First Lady in the White House and her life immediately following the assassination of her husband, United States President John F. Kennedy, in 1963. It is partly based on Theodore H. White's Life magazine interview with the widow at Hyannis Port, Massachusetts, in November 1963.

The film premiered on September 7, 2016, at the 73rd Venice International Film Festival, where it competed for the Golden Lion. It was theatrically released in the United States on December 2, 2016, by Fox Searchlight Pictures, receiving critical acclaim. It received three nominations at the 89th Academy Awards: Best Actress (for Portman), Best Original Score, and Best Costume Design.

== Plot ==
In 1963, a week after the assassination of United States President John F. Kennedy, a journalist visits his widow Jacqueline "Jackie" Kennedy for an interview at her home in Hyannis Port, Massachusetts regarding her husband's legacy. After Jackie reflects upon her 1962 televised tour of the White House, the journalist turns to inquiries about John F. Kennedy's assassination and its aftermath for Jackie and her family. She talks about events shortly prior to the assassination before describing her shock and horror in reaction.

Members of the White House close to the newly sworn-in president Lyndon B. Johnson and his wife Lady Bird are seen comforting Jackie in the aftermath aboard Air Force One. United States Attorney General and Jackie's brother-in-law, Robert F. Kennedy soon appears and shares her grief, escorting her back to Washington, D.C. Jackie expresses her deep concern for the well-being of her children in adjusting to the loss of their father.

Robert continues to support Jackie while dealing with his sadness and helps her in planning the funeral and looking after the family. She is seen struggling to sleep and becoming reliant on medications and alcohol. She is also seen regularly seeking spiritual counsel from a priest. Robert, along with President Johnson, Lady Bird, and members of the White House, witness the murder of Lee Harvey Oswald, the president's suspected killer, by Jack Ruby on live television.

Robert insists that Jackie not be informed of this by anyone but himself; he will tell her when he feels the time is right. However, she finds out about it almost immediately and condemns him for withholding it from her. After John F. Kennedy Jr.'s third birthday, Robert voices his fears to Jackie that her husband's short time as president will not be noted by future generations.

After the state funeral of John F. Kennedy, Jackie tells the priest she contemplated suicide following the assassination. She then admits to remembering what happened during the assassination and feels unbearable pain and guilt that she did not act in some way to protect her husband.

As the interview ends, Jackie makes it clear that she maintains the right to control which parts of the interview may come to press and which parts are to be withheld.

The film concludes with Jackie having her miscarried and stillborn children's coffins being re-interred next to her husband's grave at Arlington National Cemetery in Virginia.

== Cast ==
- Natalie Portman as Jacqueline "Jackie" Kennedy
- Peter Sarsgaard as Bobby Kennedy
- Greta Gerwig as Nancy Tuckerman
- Richard E. Grant as Bill Walton
- Caspar Phillipson as John Fitzgerald Kennedy
- John Carroll Lynch as Lyndon B. Johnson
- Beth Grant as Lady Bird Johnson
- Max Casella as Jack Valenti
- Billy Crudup as The Journalist (a composite of Arthur M. Schlesinger Jr., Theodore H. White, and William Manchester)
- John Hurt as The Priest
- Sara Verhagen as Mary Gallagher
- Hélène Kuhn as Pam Turnure
- Corey Johnson as Larry O'Brien
- Aidan O'Hare as Kenny O'Donnell
- Ralph Brown as Dave Powers
- David Caves as Clint Hill
- Penny Downie as Janet Lee
- Georgie Glen as Rose Kennedy
- Julie Judd as Ethel Kennedy
- Sunnie Pelant as Caroline Kennedy
- Brody and Aiden Weinberg as John F. Kennedy Jr.

A number of other historical figures are depicted in minor and non-speaking roles: Admiral George Burkley (Peter Hudson), Dr. John Walsh (John Paval), Judge Sarah T. Hughes (Vivienne Vermes), Governor John Connally (Craig Sechler), Nellie Connally (Rebecca Compton), John Metzler (David DeBoy), Charles Collingwood (Stéphane Höhn), Charles de Gaulle (Serge Onteniente), Pablo Casals (Roland Pidoux), Robert McNamara (Emmanuel Herault), Hugh Auchincloss (William Beaux d'Albenas), James C. Auchincloss (Nicolas Guigou), Jack Brooks (David Friszman), Toni Bradlee (Chloé Berthier), Benjamin Bradlee (Éric Soubelet), Ted Kennedy (Gaspard Koenig), Joan Kennedy (Mathilde Ripley), Pat Kennedy (Barbara Foliot), Peter Lawford (Albain Venzo), Eunice Kennedy (Frédérique Adler), Sargent Shriver (Patrick Hamel).

== Production ==
=== Development ===
The film's script, written by Noah Oppenheim, was conceived as an HBO miniseries, covering the "four days between John F. Kennedy's assassination and his burial, showing Jackie at both her most vulnerable and her most graceful". Steven Spielberg was originally set to produce the series, but later left the project.

Pablo Larraín, not typically inclined to directing biopics, was initially hesitant to direct Jackie when he was offered the opportunity. He stated that although he did not have any history or knowledge about John F. Kennedy's assassination, he connected with Jacqueline Kennedy. Prior to directing Jackie, he had only made films centering on male protagonists rather than women. Thus, Jackie is the first film that he could approach from a woman's perspective. He grew more interested in Kennedy after learning more about her. To him, her life after the assassination "had all the elements that you need for a movie: rage, curiosity, and love." Oppenheim said that the screenplay itself did not change much over the long development process, revealing, "When Pablo Larraín boarded the project, he had ideas. I wrote two or three more drafts with his guidance, but over a very condensed period of time. So while it took six years from first draft to completion, most of those six years were not active years."

=== Pre-production ===
In April 2010, it was announced that Rachel Weisz would star in the titular role, with Darren Aronofsky set to direct and produce the film, from Oppenheim's script. However, both Weisz and Aronofsky dropped out after they ended their romantic relationship. The same year, Steven Spielberg showed interest in helming the film. Then in September 2012, without a director, Fox Searchlight Pictures started courting Natalie Portman to star in the film as Jacqueline "Jackie" Kennedy, hoping that her participation would bring back Aronofsky, although Portman's involvement was contingent on which director signed on. At the 65th Berlin International Film Festival in February 2015, Pablo Larraín was approached by Aronofsky to direct the film, after he was impressed by the former's The Club. Larraín was skeptical, and asked Aronofsky why he wanted a Chilean man who was not fond of biopics to helm the film. In May 2015, Portman was confirmed to star in the film. That same month, Larraín was hired to direct the film, with Aronofsky working as a producer. By the 2015 Cannes Film Festival, the film was officially a go. The rest of the cast – led by Greta Gerwig and Peter Sarsgaard – were announced between May and October of the same year.

=== Casting ===
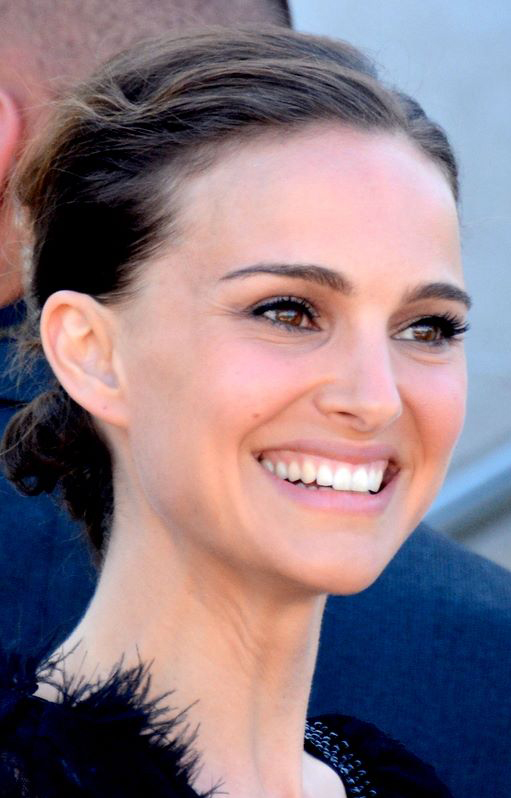
Natalie Portman undertook immense research of Kennedy in preparation for her role.

Natalie Portman was approached to star in the film in September 2012, but her casting was not confirmed until May 2015. In preparation for the role, Portman studied Jackie Kennedy extensively by watching videos of her, repeatedly watching White House tour recordings, reading books, and listening to audiotapes of her interviews. She also read around twenty of her "pulpy" biographies, which she did not consider high literature. Her primary source was the seven-part eight-and-a-half-hour Life magazine interview conducted in the early part of 1964, by Arthur M. Schlesinger Jr. with Kennedy. One of three interviews she gave following her husband's assassination, it was kept private throughout her life.

Portman said she was intimidated at first, and her initial knowledge of Kennedy was just a "superficial understanding of [Kennedy] as a fashion plate." But through playing her in the film, Portman gained a deeper understanding of the former first lady. While doing research, she found out that Kennedy had two personas in front of different people – a debutante in public but feisty behind closed doors. "When she was doing interviews, [her voice] was a lot more girly and soft, and then when you hear her talking to Schlesinger at home, you hear the ice in the glass clinking and the voice is a little deeper and her wit comes out more, so you get this real sense of the two sides."

Mimicking Jackie's ranging vocals was pivotal for Portman, since Aronofsky said "conquering Kennedy's vocals was the key to the rest of the film." Portman trained with dialect coach Tanya Blumstein, and in the beginning, had difficulty with copying Kennedy's vocals, especially on the first day of set when her initial delivery was too much. She has also said that the costumes helped her to get into character.

Portman is one of many actors to have portrayed Kennedy in cinema and on television, following Divine, Jaclyn Smith, Sarah Michelle Gellar, Roma Downey, Jill Hennessy, Joanne Whalley, Kat Steffens, Jacqueline Bisset, Jeanne Tripplehorn, Parker Posey, Blair Brown, Katie Holmes, Victoria Beckham, Ginnifer Goodwin, Stephanie Romanov and Minka Kelly.

Casting director Mathilde Snodgrass had difficulty in finding an actor to play John F. Kennedy. (She chose a non-actor she saw on a French news broadcast to play Ted Kennedy.) After failing to find one in New York, Los Angeles, London, and Paris, Snodgrass began searching in northern Europe and found Danish actor Caspar Phillipson.

=== Filming ===
Principal photography on the film began in December 2015 in the Paris-area studio Cité du Cinéma, where most of the interior scenes were shot. Production designer Rabasse and set decorator Melery oversaw replication of the White House rooms. In February 2016, production moved to downtown Washington, D.C., where JFK's funeral procession scenes were filmed.

=== Music ===
Mica Levi composed the film's accompanying score.

== Release ==
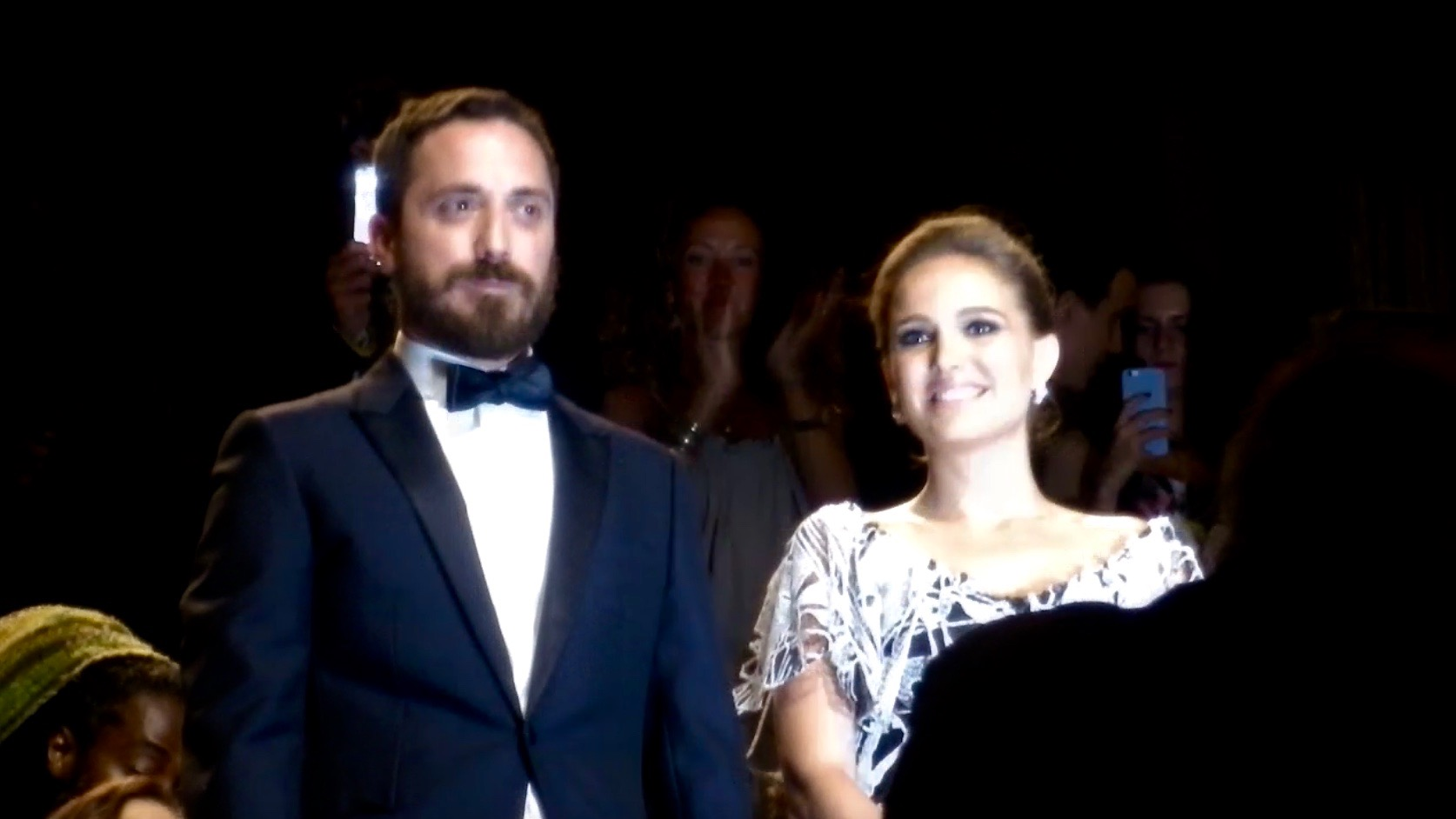
Director Pablo Larraín and actress Natalie Portman during the premiere of the film in Venice, September 2016

The film had its world premiere at the 73rd Venice International Film Festival on September 7, 2016. It also screened at the Toronto International Film Festival on September 11, 2016, winning the festival's Platform Prize. Shortly after, Fox Searchlight Pictures acquired U.S distribution rights to the film, setting it for a December 9, 2016 release; other interested studios included Netflix, Amazon Studios, and EuropaCorp. It was later moved up a week to December 2.

=== Home media ===
Jackie was released on Blu-ray, DVD, and digital download by 20th Century Fox Home Entertainment on March 7, 2017.

== Reception ==
=== Box office ===
Jackie grossed $14 million in the United States and Canada and $22.6 million in other territories for a worldwide total of $36.6 million.

Fox Searchlight opened Jackie in a limited release in five theaters across the United States on December 2, 2016. It screened at the Arclight Hollywood and the Landmark West L.A. in Los Angeles; in New York City, it played at AMC Lincoln Square, Cinema 1,2,3, and the Landmark Sunshine. It grossed $275,000 during its opening weekend (a per-theater average of $55,000), finishing 20th at the box office.

=== Critical response ===
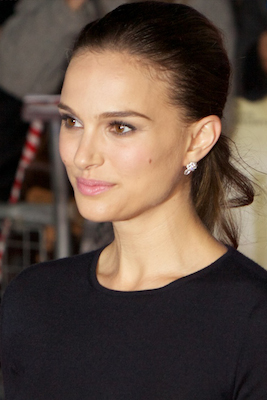
Portman garnered widespread critical acclaim for her performance, receiving a nomination for the Academy Award for Best Actress.

Jackie received wide praise from critics, with Portman's performance being widely acclaimed. On review aggregator website Rotten Tomatoes, the film has an approval rating of 87% based on 348 reviews, with an average rating of 7.91/10. The site's critical consensus reads, "Jackie offers an alluring peek into a beloved American public figure's private world — and an enthralling starring performance from Natalie Portman in the bargain." On Metacritic, the film has a score of 81 out of 100, based on 52 reviews, indicating "universal acclaim".

David Rooney of The Hollywood Reporter gave the film a highly positive review, writing that the film is "Extraordinary in its piercing intimacy and lacerating in its sorrow." Guy Lodge of Variety also gave the film a highly positive review, writing that "Chilean helmer Pablo Larraín makes an extraordinary English-lingo debut with this daring, many-leveled portrait of history's favorite First Lady." Matt Zoller Seitz of RogerEbert.com, however, gave the film two-and-a-half out of four stars, criticizing the film's frame narrative and stating that it is "not ultimately necessary (few are, alas) because... we have already seen everything both of them might have had to say illustrated, in a more immediate and often wrenching way, by the flashbacks", which "constitute a second, far superior film, one that has the shock of revelation".

=== Historical accuracy ===
The Dallas Morning News commentator Anna Parks criticized the film's negative portrayal of Jackie's relationship with Lyndon and Lady Bird Johnson. She noted that letters, as well as a taped phone conversation between President Johnson and Jackie, which occurred on December 2, 1963, showed that the former first lady and the Johnsons were cooperating well.

The film depicts Jackie informing her children Caroline and John Jr. of their father's death. In reality, Caroline learned of his death from her nanny, Maud Shaw, on the evening of the assassination.

== See also ==
- Cultural depictions of Jacqueline Kennedy Onassis
- Cultural depictions of John F. Kennedy
- Robert F. Kennedy in media
- Assassination of John F. Kennedy in popular culture
