= Tommy Cole =

American actor and singer

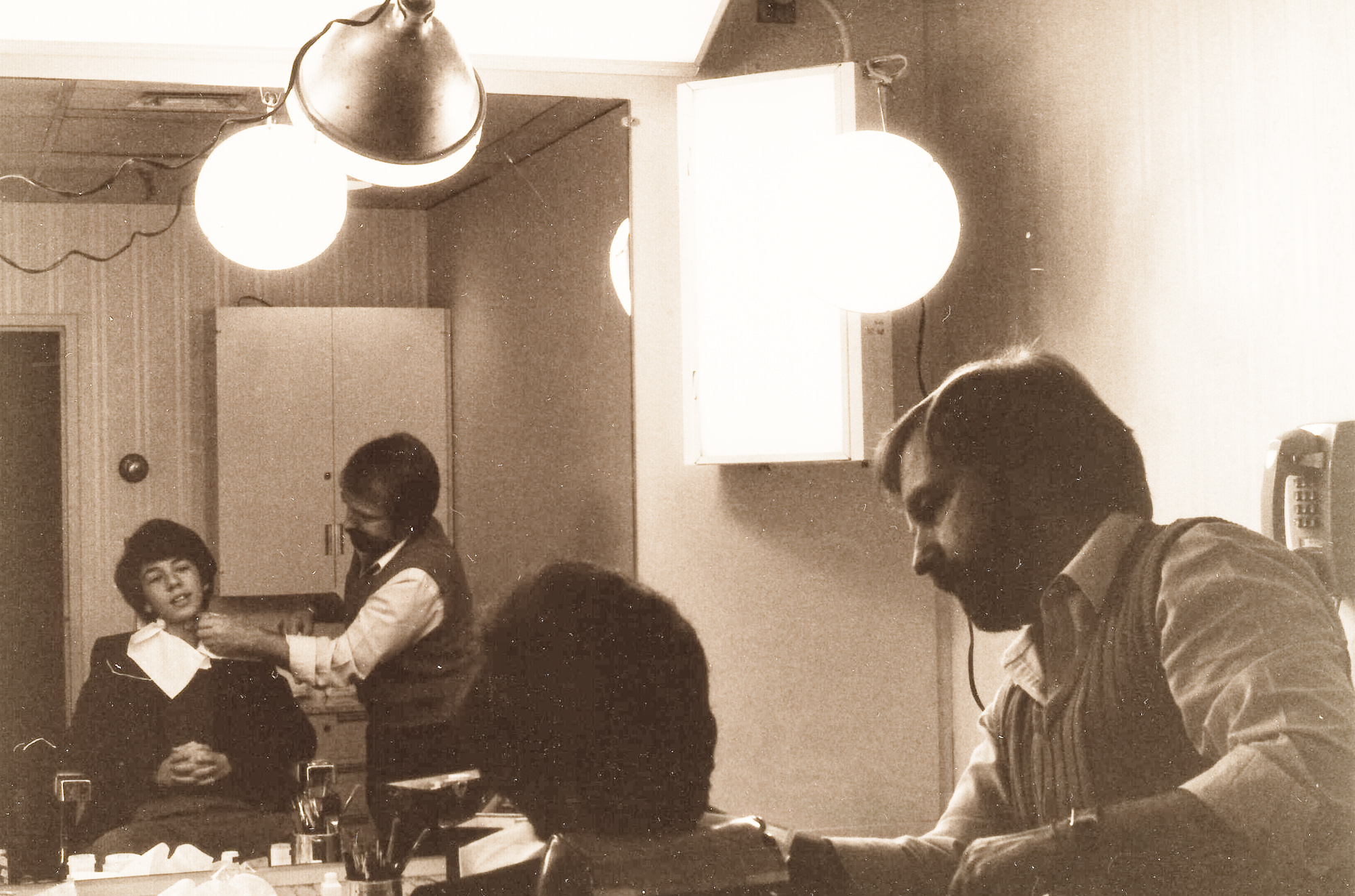
- Tommy Cole with Glenn Scarpelli
- Born: December 20, 1941 (age 84); Burbank, California, U.S.
- Occupations: Make-up artist, actor, and singer
- Years active: 1955–2007
- Spouse(s): Aileen Cole (1966–present); 2 children

Tommy Cole (born December 20, 1941) is an American make-up artist, actor, and singer who appeared as a Mouseketeer on the Mickey Mouse Club television series.

== Early life ==
Although born in Burbank, California, Tommy Cole grew up in the Los Angeles suburb of La Cañada. He was self-motivated toward performing from an early age, despite some disapproval from his family. His father was an editor of the Los Angeles Herald Examiner; his mother later worked part-time at movie studios as a welfare guardian for minor children. He has one older brother, John Cole.

== Career ==
=== Performer ===
Cole started as a musician, playing the accordion as a young teenager with three other kids in a western swing band. The band played in amateur contests and small clubs, and even managed to get a one-time gig on Ray Bolger's mid-1950s television show Where's Raymond? Besides playing the accordion, he was also the band's singer. When the ensemble auditioned together at the Disney Studio for The Mickey Mouse Club in the spring 1955, he was the only one selected to join the cast of Mouseketeers.

Cole's singing ability earned him a transfer to The Mickey Mouse Club's first-string Red Team midway through the 1955–56 season. He remained with the show for its final two seasons (1956–1958) of original programming and, after filming stopped, attended Hollywood Professional School and went on live-performance tours with other Mouseketeers to Australia in 1959 and 1960. For the next several years Tommy Cole's career was based on live-singing at teenage clubs, public events, and as an opening act for other performers. He attended Pasadena City College, did a hitch in the Air Force, and had guest star parts on a few television shows. By 1964, he had realized that his days as a performer were ending, and so looked around for some other way to stay in show business.

=== Make-up artist ===
While acting in an episode of My Three Sons in 1963, Cole had started learning make-up technique from one of the show's regular artists. He soon joined the craft as an apprentice, working first for ABC, then later in the 1960s for NBC. He began freelancing as a make-up artist in the early seventies, gathering Emmy nominations in 1975 for Masquerade Party and 1978 for Once Upon a Brothers Grimm, before winning, along with Mark Bussan and Ron Walters, in 1979 for Backstairs at the White House.

Cole has since been nominated for Emmy awards for the miniseries Right to Die (1988), the television series Wings (1996), and most recently for the TV special Gepetto (2000), for which he shared in winning the Hollywood Makeup Artists and Hairstylist Guild Award.

== Personal life ==
Tommy's wife Aileen is a former dancer. They met in Korea, on a USO tour in the mid-1960s, and married after they had both returned stateside. They have two children.

== Select filmography ==
=== Select credits as makeup artist ===
- Masquerade Party TV series (1974)
- Once Upon a Brothers Grimm TV Movie (1977)
- Backstairs at the White House TV Miniseries (1979)
- Pretty in Pink (1986) ... makeup artist
- Right to Die TV Movie (1987)
- L.A. Confidential (1997)
- Presence of Mind (1999)
- Forever Fabulous (1999)
- Gepetto TV special (2000)
- Sorority Boys (2002; Head of makeup department)

== Select credits as actor ==
- The Mickey Mouse Club series regular (1955–1958)
- Disneyland: The Fourth Anniversary Show (1957)
- Leave It to Beaver (episode: "Borrowed Boat"; 1959)
- My Three Sons (episode: "A Car of His Own"; 1963)
- The Wonderful World of Disney ("The Mouseketeer Reunion"; 1980)
- The Mickey Mouse Club Story (1995 documentary)
