= Fishbait Miller =

Doorkeeper of the U.S. House of Representatives

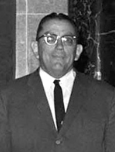

Doorkeeper of the United States House of Representatives
- In office January 3, 1955 – December 31, 1974
- Preceded by: Tom J. Kennamer
- Succeeded by: James T. Molloy
- In office January 3, 1949 – January 3, 1953
- Preceded by: M.L. Meletio
- Succeeded by: Tom J. Kennamer

Personal details
- Born: William Moseley Miller; July 20, 1909 Pascagoula, Mississippi
- Died: September 12, 1989 (aged 80) Greensboro, North Carolina

William Moseley "Fishbait" Miller (July 20, 1909 – September 12, 1989) was an American who served as Doorkeeper of the United States House of Representatives from 1949 to 1953 and again from 1955 to 1974.

== Early life ==
William Moseley Miller was born on July 20, 1909, in Pascagoula, Mississippi to Albert Magnus Miller, a sea captain, and his wife Nettie Maddox. As a child he was nicknamed "Fishbait" for his small stature (he weighed 75 lb (34 kg) at the age of 15), and he was known by this name his entire life. Miller worked at the local pharmacy for several years, where he met William Colmer, then a district attorney. Colmer helped him get into Harrison-Stone Junior College, which he attended from 1929 to 1932.

== Career ==
Miller began working in the United States House of Representatives in 1933 as a clerk in the House's Post Office. Colmer had offered him the job after being elected to the House. By 1947, Miller was minority doorkeeper for the House and two years later he was elected to the post of Doorkeeper of the United States House of Representatives. In this role, he oversaw more than 350 employees and a $3.5 million budget. He served as doorkeeper from 1949 to 1953 and again from 1955 to 1974, and again was minority doorkeeper from 1953 to 1955 during the 83rd Congress, when the House was controlled by the Republican Party. When Miller drew office assignments for House members, he was known to sand his fingertips in order to identify the discs he was drawing and ensure that Democratic members received desirable offices.

Miller was known for having a "flamboyant personality and affinity for the public spotlight", for his announcement of "Mr. Speaker, the President of the United States", during the State of the Union address, and for enforcing traditions of the House. For example, he once told Bella Abzug to remove her hat before entering the chamber. In response, she told Miller to "go fuck yourself"; however, seeing him unfazed, she relented and took off her hat. Miller also functioned in the role by escorting visiting foreign dignitaries. In 1951, he drew attention for addressing the visiting Princess Elizabeth of the United Kingdom with the salutation "Howdy, ma'am", and greeting her husband, Prince Philip, Duke of Edinburgh, with "Howdy, suh"; Miller was later required to attend "protocol school" at the State Department.

A 1950 profile in The New York Times described Miller as "odd-jobs man for his 435 bosses", mentioning that he functioned as "baby-sitter, cigar-lighter, gum-giver and even water boy". He earned $40,000 a year, $2,500 less than a congressperson.

In 1974, Miller faced competition for his job for the first time since 1949. He had been increasingly criticized for enjoying attention too much, which rankled some members of Congress. On December 2, 1974, he was ousted and replaced by James T. Molloy. Upon leaving the post, Miller remarked, "I have lived a good life, a full life", and, "I have enjoyed every minute of it and as I leave I have no regrets and no axes to grind".

He wrote Fishbait: The Memoirs of the Congressional Doorkeeper with Frances Spatz Leighton, which was published in 1977. In April 1977, he was featured on the CBS television news magazine show 60 Minutes.

== Personal life ==
Miller married Mabel Breeland in 1937. They had one child.

He died September 12, 1989, in Greensboro, North Carolina, of a heart attack. The Washington Post described him as an "enthusiastic socializer and an irrepressible dynamo".
