= Maggie Rogers (White House maid) =

Housemaid in the White House (1874–1953)

Margaret D. Williams Rogers (1874 – July 19, 1953) was an American housemaid at the White House who served for 30 years (1909–1939), during the administrations of Presidents Taft, Wilson, Harding, Coolidge, Hoover, and part of Franklin D. Roosevelt's, eventually rising to head housemaid. She began her service on the fourth day of the Taft administration.

Eleanor Roosevelt encouraged Rogers to write a diary about her experiences on the White House staff. Those experiences were memorialized in the book My Thirty Years Backstairs at the White House written by her daughter, Lillian Rogers Parks, who also worked at the White House as a seamstress. The story was later produced in 1979 as the NBC miniseries Backstairs at the White House by Ed Friendly Productions. The role of Maggie Rogers was played by actress Olivia Cole.

Emmett Rogers Jr., Margaret's son, was a U.S. serviceman who was gassed in World War I and had to retire to Arizona for his health.

== See also ==
- Eugene Allen (butler)
- Alonzo Fields (butler)
- White House Chief Usher
- Irwin "Ike" H. Hoover (Chief Usher)
- Howell G. Crim (Chief Usher)
- Elizabeth Jaffray (Head Housekeeper)
