= Right to Die (film) =

1987 television film by Paul Wendkos

- Film poster
- Written by: Phil Penningroth
- Directed by: Paul Wendkos
- Starring: Raquel Welch; Michael Gross
- Composer: Brad Fiedel
- Country of origin: United States
- Original language: English

Production
- Executive producer: Don Ohlmeyer
- Producer: Karen Danaher-Dorr
- Cinematography: Bernd Heinl
- Editor: James Galloway
- Running time: 90 minutes
- Production company: Ohlmeyer Communications Company

Original release
- Network: NBC
- Release: October 12, 1987

Right to Die is an American drama television film that premiered on NBC on October 12, 1987. Directed by Paul Wendkos and written by Phil Penningroth, it is based on articles in The New York Times written by Andrew H. Malcolm. The film stars Raquel Welch and Michael Gross, with Bonnie Bartlett, Peter Michael Goetz, and Joanna Miles in supporting roles. It was nominated for three Primetime Emmy Awards and Welch was nominated for a Golden Globe Award for her performance.

Right to Die was one of three films that Welch said she was most proud of.

== Plot ==
Emily Bauer is a successful psychologist who is living the ideal family life until she is suddenly diagnosed with ALS, better known as Lou Gehrig's disease. In the beginning stages, she puts up a courageous fight against this terrible affliction, but her condition is deteriorating, which eventually leaves her in a vegetative state. Emily then pleads with her husband to help her die.

== Cast ==
- Raquel Welch as Emily Bauer
- Michael Gross as Bob Bauer
- Bonnie Bartlett as Lillian
- Peter Michael Goetz as Woody Charris
- Joanna Miles as Katherine
- Ed O'Neill as Bob Bauer's Business Partner
- Diane Salinger as Betsy
- Mark Shera as Roger
- Cástulo Guerra as Dr. Reuben Espinoza
- Jaclyn Bernstein as Lynn
- Karen Landry as Lindsay James
- Alan Fudge as Dr. Harley Albert

== Reception ==
=== Critical response ===
The New York Times' television critic John J. O'Connor called Right to Die a "rare made-for-television movie that keeps veering away from easy expectations". Don Shirley of the Los Angeles Times described the first half of the film as "a clunky piece of storytelling that much of the audience may tune out" and wrote that "the woman's joie de vivre is expressed via imagery that looks like it was inspired by commercials (Paul Wendkos directed), and Penningroth's dialogue says all the usual things, in all the usual ways". Clifford Terry of the Chicago Tribune stated that "the movie, like Whose Life Is It Anyway?, devotes most of its time to tough, complex moral and ethical questions, including a dialogue on the nature of suffering" and "the flashbacks, while dramatically convenient, are intrusive and make the movie choppy". All three critics praised Welch's performance, with O'Connor writing: "Ms. Welch gives an enormously affecting performance as Emily Bauer, not only uncompromising but also admirably sensitive to the larger intentions of the film". Gross's performance was also praised, with Terry writing: "Gross gives a surprisingly adequate performance".

=== Accolades ===
Year	Award	Category	Recipient(s)	Result	Ref.
1988	45th Golden Globe Awards	Best Actress in a Miniseries or Television Film	Raquel Welch	Nominated	
1988	38th American Cinema Editors Awards	Best Edited Television Special	James Galloway	Nominated	
1988	40th Primetime Creative Arts Emmy Awards	Outstanding Hairstyling for a Miniseries or a Special	N. Kristine Chadwick; Kathy W. Estocin	Nominated	
1988	40th Primetime Creative Arts Emmy Awards	Outstanding Makeup for a Miniseries or a Special	Tommy Cole; Pat Gerhardt	Nominated	
1988	40th Primetime Creative Arts Emmy Awards	Outstanding Sound Mixing for a Dramatic Miniseries or a Special	Joseph D. Citarella; Charles Grenzbach; Walter Hoylman; Ray West	Nominated	
