= My Thirty Years Backstairs at the White House =

1961 book by Lillian Rogers Parks

- Author: Lillian Rogers Parks
- Language: English
- Publisher: Fleet Pub. Corp
- Publication date: 1961
- LC Class: E176.1 .P37

My Thirty Years Backstairs at the White House is a 1961 autobiographical novel by Lillian Rogers Parks written with Frances Spatz Leighton. The title of the memoir was based on Parks' recollections of thirty years as a seamstress in the White House from 1931–1961 during the administrations of Hoover, Roosevelt, Truman, and Eisenhower. The book also includes 30 previous years of childhood memories during the Taft, Wilson, Harding, Coolidge, Hoover, and Roosevelt administrations when her mother, Margaret 'Maggie' Rogers, performed domestic service as head housemaid at the White House from 1909–1939. The popularity of the book and the depth of its detail caused First Lady Jacqueline Kennedy to have all White House domestic employees sign a pledge to not write about their White House experiences.

== Film, TV and theatrical adaptations ==
NBC aired the miniseries Backstairs at the Whitehouse in 1979 which was based on the book. In the miniseries Lillian Rogers Parks was portrayed by Leslie Uggams. Maggie Rogers was played by Olivia Cole who received an Emmy nomination for her performance.
