= Szysznyk =

- Created by: Jim Mulligan; Ron Landry
- Starring: Ned Beatty; Olivia Cole; Leonard Barr; Thomas Carter
- Theme music composer: Sonny Curtis
- Opening theme: Where Was I
- Country of origin: United States
- Original language: English
- No. of seasons: 2
- No. of episodes: 15 (4 unaired)

Production
- Running time: 30 minutes
- Production companies: Four's Company Productions; Paramount Television

Original release
- Network: CBS
- Release: August 1, 1977 – January 25, 1978

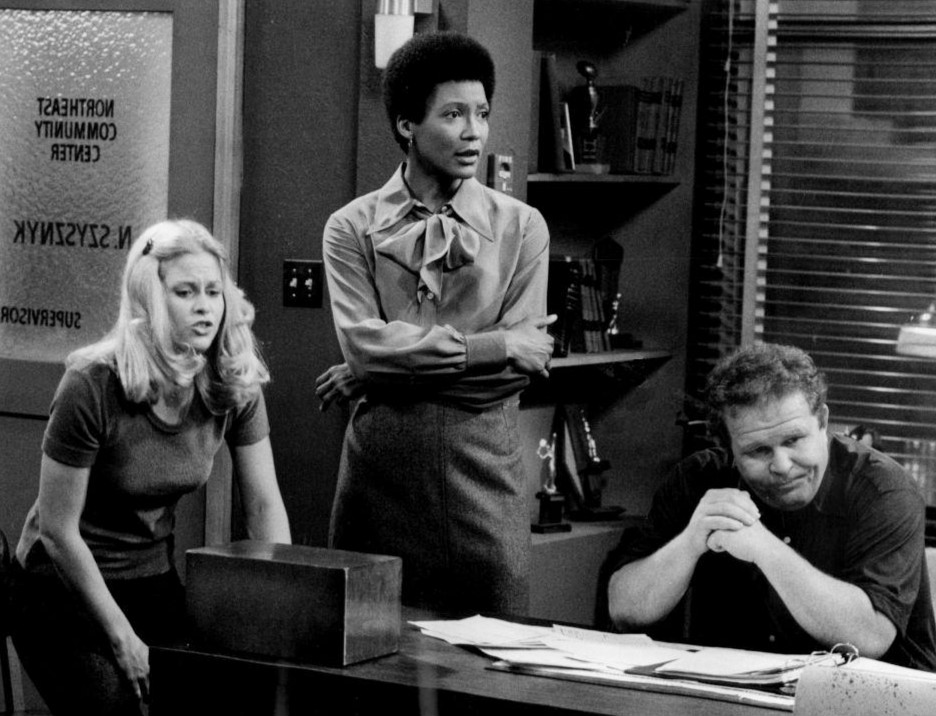
Susan Lanier, Olivia Cole and Ned Beatty in a scene from the show.

Szysznyk (pronounced SIZ-nik) is an American sitcom produced by Paramount Television. Originally broadcast on CBS as a summer replacement series, five episodes were aired during August 1977, followed by ten more during the 1977-78 television season. The series starred Ned Beatty as Nick Szysznyk.

== Plot ==
Retired Marine Nick Szysznyk is a supervisor at a Washington, D.C. community center.

The ongoing punchline of the show was that people meeting Szysznyk for the first time almost invariably mispronounced his surname. An example from one episode included a narcotics detective who pronounced his name "Sneeze-wick".

== Cast ==
- Ned Beatty as Nick Szysznyk
- Olivia Cole as Ms. Harrison
- Scott Colomby as Tony La Placa
- Leonard Barr as Leonard Kriegler
- Thomas Carter as Ray Gun

=== Guest stars ===
- Susan Lanier as Sandi Chandler

== Episodes ==
=== Season 1 (1977) ===
No. overall	No. in season	Title	Directed by	Written by	Original release date
1	1	"Welcome to the Club"	Unknown	Jim Mulligan & Ron Landry	August 1, 1977
2	2	"Little Puff"	Unknown	Michael Elias	August 8, 1977
3	3	"To the Lighthouse"	Unknown	Jim Mulligan & Ron Landry	August 15, 1977
4	4	"North by Northeast"	Unknown	Jim Mulligan & Ron Landry	August 22, 1977
5	5	"Draft Choice"	Unknown	Michael Elias	August 29, 1977

=== Season 2 (1977–78) ===
No. overall	No. in season	Title	Directed by	Written by	Original release date
6	1	"Ball Three"	Unknown	Alan Rosen & Fred Rubin	December 7, 1977
7	2	"Street Gang"	Unknown	Barry Kemp	December 14, 1977
8	3	"Beef Encounters"	Unknown	April Kelly & George Geiger	December 21, 1977
9	4	"Run, Jenny, Run"	Unknown	Jim Mulligan & Ron Landry	December 28, 1977
10	5	"Fortwengler's Wedding"	Unknown	David Dozer & Janet Coleman	January 4, 1978
11	6	"You Stomped on My Heart"	Unknown	Howard Albrecht & Sol Weinstein	January 25, 1978
12	7	"Youth of the Year"	N/A	Alan Rosen & Fred Rubin	Unaired
13	8	"Hell on Wheels"	N/A	Jim Mulligan & Ron Landry	Unaired
14	9	"Norton's Head Trip"	N/A	Michael Weinberger	Unaired
15	10	"A Star is Burned"	N/A	Craig Haffner & Richard Jones	Unaired
