= Pamela Turnure =

American press secretary (1937–2023)

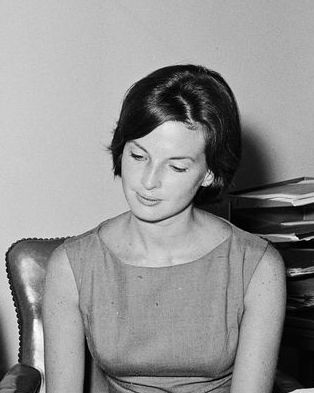

Press Secretary for the First Lady
- In office January 20, 1961 – November 22, 1963
- President: John F. Kennedy
- Leader: Jacqueline Kennedy
- Preceded by: Office established
- Succeeded by: Liz Carpenter

Personal details
- Born: November 20, 1937 New York City, U.S.
- Died: April 25, 2023 (aged 85) Edwards, Colorado, U.S.
- Party: Democratic
- Spouse: Robert N. Timmins
- Education: Georgetown University

Pamela Harrison Turnure Timmins (November 20, 1937 – April 25, 2023) was the first Press Secretary hired to serve a First Lady of the United States. She was the Press Secretary to Jacqueline Kennedy. Turnure reportedly had an extramarital affair with 35th President of the United States John F. Kennedy.

== Early life and education ==
Turnure was born in New York City on November 20, 1937. She attended the Bolton School for girls in Westport, Connecticut, then Colby Junior College (now called Colby-Sawyer College) in New Hampshire. She went on to study at Mount Vernon Junior College in Washington.

== Career ==
Turnure worked for then-United States Senator John F. Kennedy as a receptionist and secretary in his Senate office from 1958 until his election in 1960. Turnure then was hired as the first Press Secretary to a First Lady in United States history, working under Jacqueline Kennedy.

In her role as press secretary, Turnure was frequently present at diplomatic receptions and to receive foreign dignitaries. Turnure also helped to coordinate Ms. Kennedy's nationally televised White House tour and historical preservation efforts.

Turnure was aboard Air Force One at Love Field Airport as Lyndon B. Johnson took the oath of office two hours and eight minutes after the assassination of John F. Kennedy in Dallas, Texas. Shortly after the assassination took place, Vice President Johnson kissed Turnure on the hand.

After the assassination and funeral, Turnure left for New York and worked on President Kennedy's administrative papers, a project that was funded by Aristotle Onassis. Turnure also served for a period as the manager of Mrs. Kennedy Onassis' private office and was present at her funeral.

After working for the Kennedy family, Turnure was an interior designer in the Manhattan area.

== Alleged affair with Kennedy ==
In The Dark Side of Camelot published in 1997, author Seymour Hersh alleged that Kennedy had an extramarital affair with Turnure starting in 1958 when she was working in his Senate office and continuing long thereafter. In 1958, Turnure's landlady Florence Kater allegedly took a photograph of the senator leaving Turnure's apartment building in the middle of the night, a photograph that Kater tried repeatedly to bring to public attention to ruin the senator's presidential campaign, according to Hersh. Kater and her husband allegedly rigged a tape recorder to pick up sounds of the couple's lovemaking and made an enlargement of their picture of Kennedy as he exited the building. The credibility of The Dark Side of Camelot was called into question immediately after its 1997 publication.

== Personal life ==
Turnure was the daughter of Louise Gwynn and Lawrence Turnure, a New York banker. Her stepfather was Frederic Drake, who was the publisher of Harper's Bazaar and Vice President of Hearst Communications.

Turnure previously dated Prince Aly Khan. She also had an affair with singer Eddie Fisher as claimed in his autobiography, Been There, Done That. Turnure was married to New York investment banker Robert N. Timmins and resided in Manhattan. Jacqueline Kennedy attended the wedding and threw a private reception for the couple at her Fifth Avenue apartment.

Turnure resided in Edwards, Colorado. She died from lung cancer at her home on April 25, 2023, at the age of 85.

== In popular culture ==
In the 2016 film Jackie, Turnure was portrayed by Hélène Kuhn.
