= Olivia Cole =

American actress (1942–2018)

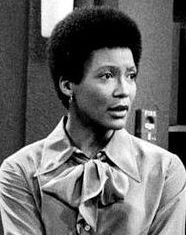
- Cole in 1977
- Born: Olivia Carlena Cole; November 26, 1942; Memphis, Tennessee, U.S.
- Died: January 19, 2018 (aged 75); San Miguel de Allende, Mexico
- Occupation: Actress
- Years active: 1969–2011
- Spouse: Richard Venture (m. 1971; div. 1984)

Olivia Carlena Cole (November 26, 1942 – January 19, 2018) was an American actress, best known for her Emmy Award-winning role in the 1977 miniseries Roots.

== Early life and education ==
Cole was born in Memphis, Tennessee, the daughter of Arvelia Cole (née Cage), a tennis player, instructor, entrepreneur and William Calvin Cole, a worker for Grumman. After graduating from Manhattan's Hunter College High School in 1960, she studied drama at Bard College in New York and earned a scholarship to attend the Royal Academy of Dramatic Art in London, where she graduated with honors in 1964. After returning to the United States, she earned a master's degree in theater arts with minor in Scandinavian studies in 1967 from the University of Minnesota.

== Career ==
Cole made her screen debut in the daytime soap opera Guiding Light in 1969 and later appeared in over 30 shows and films.

Cole won an Emmy Award for her performance as Matilda, Chicken George's wife, in the 1977 miniseries Roots. Cole became the first African American actress to win the Primetime Emmy Award for Outstanding Single Performance by a Supporting Actress in a Comedy or Drama Series for her performance in Roots.

She also was known for her role as Maggie Rogers in the 1979 miniseries Backstairs at the White House, for which she was nominated for a Primetime Emmy Award for Outstanding Lead Actress in a Miniseries or a Movie.

Cole starred in the CBS sitcoms Szysznyk from 1977 to 1978 and Report to Murphy in 1982. She also was cast in the ABC drama miniseries The Women of Brewster Place with Oprah Winfrey in 1990 and previously appeared in another miniseries North and South, Book I (1985). She also guest-starred on Police Woman, Family, L.A. Law, "Christy" and Murder, She Wrote.

Cole's Broadway credits include The School for Scandal, You Can't Take It with You, The Merchant of Venice, and The National Health.

She was an honorary member of the Alpha Kappa Alpha sorority. In film, she appeared in Heroes (1977), Coming Home (1978), Some Kind of Hero (1982), Go Tell It on the Mountain (1984), Big Shots (1987), First Sunday (2008) as well as in the television movies Something About Amelia (1984) and The Women of Brewster Place (1989).

== Personal life and death ==
In June 1971, she married actor Richard Venture, one of the few to enter an interracial marriage in Hollywood at that time. They later divorced in 1984. She retired in 1995, but later returned to acting.

Cole died 31 days after ex-husband, actor Richard Venture; at her home in San Miguel de Allende, Mexico on January 19, 2018, age 75 following a heart attack.

== Filmography ==
Film & Television Credits
Year	Title	Role	Notes
1969–1971	Guiding Light	Deborah Mehraen	Television debut; series regular
1975–1976	Police Woman	Head Nurse/Dr. Dorothy Bailey/Dr. Georgia Kimberly	3 episodes
1977	Roots	Matilda Moore	TV Miniseries 3 episodes
1977	Rafferty	Sara Ridley	Episode: "Brothers & Sons"
1977	Heroes	Jane Adcox	film debut
1977–1978	Szysznyk	Ms. Harrison	series regular; 15 episodes
1978	Coming Home	Corrine	
1978	Family	Frances Rossmore	Episode: "Fear of Shadows"
1979	Insight	Karen Clay	Episode: "When, Jenny? When?"
1979	Backstairs at the White House	Maggie Rogers	TV Miniseries 4 episodes
1979	The Lazarus Syndrome	Pamela Quinn	Episode: "A Brutal Assault"
1980	Children of Divorce	Betty Williams	Television Movie
1980	The Sky Is Gray	Olivia	Television Movie
1981	Fly Home	Sarah Brookford	Television Movie
1981	Mistress of Paradise	Victorine	Television Movie
1982	Some Kind of Hero	Jesse	
1982	Report to Murphy	Blanche	6 episodes
1984	Go Tell It on the Mountain	Elizabeth	
1984	Something About Amelia	Ruth Walters	
1985	American Playhouse	Elizabeth	Episode: "Go Tell It on the Mountain"
1985	North and South, Book I	Maum Sally	TV miniseries (6 episodes)
1985–1995	Murder, She Wrote	Yvette Dauphin/Melinda Coop/Callie Coleman	3 episodes
1987	Big Shots	Mrs. Newton	
1987	The Fig Tree		Television Movie
1989	The Women of Brewster Place	Miss Sophie	2 episodes
1989–1993	L.A. Law	Judge Julie McFarlane	3 episodes
1990	Brewster Place	Miss Sophie	series regular; 11 episodes
1993	Arly Hanks	Estelle	Television Movie
1995	Christy	Esther Scott	Episode: "Echoes"
2008	First Sunday	Momma T	
2011	Be Good, Be Nice	Young Girl	Short film

== Awards and nominations ==
- 1977 Primetime Emmy award, Outstanding Single Performance by a Supporting Actress in a Comedy or Drama Series for Roots - won
- 1979 Primetime Emmy award, Outstanding Lead Actress in a Limited Series or Special for Backstairs at the White House - nominated
- 2007 TV Land award, Anniversary award (shared with LeVar Burton, Louis Gossett, Jr., Leslie Uggams, John Amos, Ben Vereen, Todd Bridges, Cicely Tyson, Lawrence-Hilton Jacobs, Georg Stanford Brown) for Roots
