= Leonard Barr =

American actor and comedian (1903–1980)

- Barr in Diamonds Are Forever, 1971
- Born: Leonard Barra; September 27, 1903; West Virginia, U.S.
- Died: November 22, 1980 (aged 77); Burbank, California, U.S.
- Notable work: Diamonds Are Forever
- Relatives: Dean Martin (nephew)

Comedy career
- Years active: 1970–1980
- Medium: Stand-up, television, film
- Genre: One-liners

Leonard Barr (born Leonard Barra; September 27, 1903 – November 22, 1980) was an American stand-up comedian, film actor, and dancer.

== Career ==
Barr appeared several times with Dean Martin (his nephew) and Jerry Lewis when they hosted the Colgate Comedy Hour. He had a brief role in The Sting, as a burlesque comic. That is also the way his character is listed in the credits—as an anonymous comedian. However, in the wings of the stage just before the comic's entrance, he has a brief conversation with Johnny Hooker (Robert Redford), who addresses him as "Leonard". Barr's comedic schtick was one-liners; told with a straight face, and sometimes deliberately repeating a punchline.

In the 1971 James Bond film Diamonds Are Forever, he played Shady Tree, a stand-up comedian and smuggler in Las Vegas. He also appeared in The Odd Couple in the non-dialogue New York street scenes in the first season and in later episodes with dialogue; and, albeit unnamed, on an episode of M*A*S*H as a USO comedian. He also made numerous guest appearances on The Tonight Show Starring Johnny Carson, as well as Martin's own variety show. Cameron Crowe briefly depicted Barr as a foul-mouthed real-life character in Almost Famous, his semi-autobiographical film of 2000.

== Personal life ==
He was the uncle of Dean Martin (being the brother of Dean Martin's mother Angela).

== Death ==
Barr died in Burbank, California, at age 77 on November 22, 1980, after suffering a stroke three weeks earlier.

== Filmography ==
Year	Title	Role	Notes
1971	Diamonds Are Forever	Shady Tree	Film debut
1973	The Sting	Burlesque House Comedian	
1978	Record City	Sickly Man	
1979	Skatetown, U.S.A.		
1981	Under the Rainbow	Pops	Final film

== Television ==
Year	Title	Role	Notes
1970	Love, American Style	Passing Buck	Segment: "Love and the Longest Night"
1970–1975	The Odd Couple	Various	5 episodes
1972	Evil Roy Slade	Crippled Man	TV movie
1975	Little House on the Prairie	Proprietor	Episode: "To See the World"
1976	The Tony Randall Show	Bellhop	Episode: "Case: His Honor vs. Her Honor"
1977	Billy: Portrait of a Street Kid	Hospital Roommate	TV movie
1978	Szysznyk	Leonard Kriegler	
1978	Battered	Professor Jeremiah Hayden	TV movie
1980	Tenspeed and Brown Shoe	Comic	Pilot
