= Report to Murphy =

- Genre: Sitcom
- Created by: Patricia Jones; Donald Reiker
- Starring: Michael Keaton; Donnelly Rhodes; Olivia Cole
- Composer: JAM Creative Productions
- Country of origin: United States
- Original language: English
- No. of seasons: 1
- No. of episodes: 6

Production
- Executive producers: Roger Gimbel; Harry Colomby; Jeff Bricmont
- Producer: Terry Hughes
- Running time: 30 minutes
- Production companies: Jenro Company; Jones-Reiker Ink Group; K/C Productions; Roger Gimbel Productions; EMI Television

Original release
- Network: CBS
- Release: April 5 – May 31, 1982

Report to Murphy is an American television sitcom starring Michael Keaton that aired on CBS from April 5 to May 31, 1982.

== Synopsis ==
The series is about the everyday problems and frustrations of a parole officer, as he deals with the released prisoners that come and go. The theme music was composed by JAM Creative Productions in Dallas, Texas who are best known for creating jingle imaging for TV and radio stations.

== Cast ==
- Michael Keaton as Murphy
- Donnelly Rhodes as Charlie
- Margot Rose as Baker
- Olivia Cole as Blanche
- Donna Ponterotto as Lucy

== Episodes ==
Six episodes are registered with the United States Copyright Office.

No.	Title	Directed by	Written by	Original release date	Prod. code
1	"Pilot"	Asaad Kelada	Patricia Jones & Donald Reiker	April 5, 1982	100
One of the parolees (Dan Hedaya) steals a stereo tape deck from Murphy's house, then calls Murphy for instructions on how to use it.
2	"The Girl Most Likely"	Terry Hughes	Joanne Pagliaro	April 12, 1982	102
The beautiful campus queen (Simone Griffeth) whom Murphy worshipped from afar in high school shows up as one of his parolees and delivers what looks like the kayo punch to his career.
3	"Charlie Goes Awry"	John Bowab	Dennis Klein	April 19, 1982	107
Charlie suddenly goes wacky after his customary rough, tough tactics drive a parolee to near suicide.
4	"High Noon"	Terry Hughes	Patricia Jones & Donald Reiker	April 26, 1982	101
Murphy's toughness turns to panic when he gets a note from Louie (Aldo Ray) bearing a death threat.
5	"Baker vs. Murphy"	Unknown	Rick Orloff	May 17, 1982	103
Murphy's sweetheart, an assistant D.A., breaks the news that she'll be prosecuting one of Murphy's favorite parolees.
6	"Papillion"	Terry Hughes	Mitch Markowitz	May 31, 1982	105
Conscience-stricken over his "good life," Murphy volunteers to go to prison for a taste of life in stir.
