= Once Upon a Brothers Grimm =

- Genre: Family; Fantasy; Musical
- Written by: Jean Holloway
- Directed by: Norman Campbell
- Starring: Dean Jones; Paul Sand
- Music by: Mitch Leigh (music); Sammy Cahn (lyrics)
- Country of origin: United States
- Original language: English

Production
- Producers: Bernard Rothman; Jack Wohl
- Production locations: Samuel Goldwyn Studio; Hollywood, California
- Editor: Jerry Greene
- Running time: 120 minutes
- Production company: Rothman/Wohl Productions

Original release
- Network: CBS
- Release: November 23, 1977

Once Upon a Brothers Grimm is a 1977 American made-for-television musical fantasy film starring Dean Jones and Paul Sand, directed by Norman Campbell. It follows the Brothers Grimm as they make their way to a king's palace with their magical world of fairy tales. The music was written by Mitch Leigh with lyrics by Sammy Cahn. The two-hour film premiered on CBS on November 23, 1977.

== Plot ==
Jacob and Wilhelm Grimm are traveling to a king's palace to present him with their fairy tales. Their carriage driver refuses to take them into the woods because they are said to be enchanted. Not wanting to miss their audience with the king, the brothers buy the carriage from the driver and travel into the woods alone. Placed under the enchantment of the woods, the brothers begin to encounter a wide range of characters that exist in their tales, including Snow White and Sleeping Beauty among many others.

== List of Grimm Fairy Tales referenced in the film ==
- Snow White
- Sleeping Beauty
- Town Musicians of Bremen
- The Golden Goose
- Hansel and Gretel
- Little Red Riding Hood
- Rumpelstiltskin
- The Six Swans
- The Twelve Dancing Princesses (or "The Shoes that were Danced to Pieces")
- The Frog Prince
- Cinderella

== Cast ==
- Dean Jones as Jacob Grimm
- Paul Sand as Wilhelm Grimm
- Arte Johnson as Selfish and Mean
- Sorrell Booke as King of Hesse

== Segments ==
=== Hansel and Gretel ===
- Todd Lookinland as Hansel
- Mia Bendixsen as Gretel
- Chita Rivera as Gingerbread Lady
- Edie McClurg as Esmeralda

=== Cinderella ===
- Stephanie Steele as Cinderella
- Corinne Conley as Fairy Godmother
- John McCook as Prince Charming
- Gordon Connell as Driver

=== Sleeping Beauty ===
- Joanna Kirkland as Sleeping Beauty
- John Clifford as The Prince
- Los Angeles Ballet

=== Little Red Riding Hood ===
- Susan Silo as Little Red Riding Hood
- Dean Jones as Grandmother
- Cleavon Little as The Big Bad Wolf

=== The Frog Prince ===
- Teri Garr as Princess
- Ken Olfson as The King

=== The Bremen Town Musicians ===
- Don Correia as The Ass
- Joe Giamalva as The Rooster
- Gary Morgan as The Hound
- Maria Pogee as The Cat

=== The King with Eight Daughters ===
- Clive Revill as Rumplestiltskin
- Ruth Buzzi as Queen Astrid
- Dan Tobin as Prime Minister

== Awards ==
Once Upon a Brothers Grimm was nominated for five Primetime Emmy Awards in 1978 and won two of them.

=== Wins ===
- Outstanding Individual Achievement in Children's Programming (Bill Hargate, costume designer)
- Outstanding Individual Achievement in Children's Programming (Robert Checchi, set decorator; Ken Johnson, art director)

=== Nominations ===
- Outstanding Individual Achievement in Children's Programming (Larry Abbott, makeup; Tommy Cole, makeup; Michael G. Westmore, makeup)
- Outstanding Individual Achievement in Children's Programming (Jerry Greene, video tape editor)
- Outstanding Children's Special

== See also ==
- The Wonderful World of the Brothers Grimm (1962)
- The Brothers Grimm (2005)
