= Richard Venture =

American actor (1923-2017)

- Born: Richard Charles Venturella; November 12, 1923; New York City, New York, U.S.
- Died: December 19, 2017 (aged 94); Chester, Connecticut, U.S.
- Occupation: Actor
- Years active: 1954–2001
- Spouses: Grayce Grant (m. 1946; div. 1971) Olivia Cole (m. 1971; div. 1984) Lorraine Venture (m. 1984; div. 1995) Katherine Catalano-Venture (m. 2003–2017)
- Children: 4

Richard Venture (born Richard Charles Venturella; November 12, 1923 – December 19, 2017) was an American actor. He performed in more than eighty films from 1964 to 2001. His television guest-credits include The Days and Nights of Molly Dodd, Fame, Street Hawk and Murder, She Wrote. Venture died just 31 days prior to ex-wife actress Olivia Cole, in December 2017 at the age of 94.

Venture was born in New York City.

He debuted on Broadway in Dinosaur Wharf (1951). His other Broadway credits included The National Health (1974), Chemin de Fer (1973), The Visit (1973), Murderous Angels (1971), Solitaire / Double Solitaire (1971) Double Solitaire (1971), and The Merchant of Venice (1951).

Venture wed actress Grayce Grant in 1946, and they divorced in 1971. They had four children. He was married to actress Olivia Cole from 1971 until their divorce in 1984. He and Lorraine Venture married in 1984 and divorced in 1995. He was married to Katherine Catalano-Venture in 2003 until his death in 2017.

Venture served in the United States Navy during World War II.

== Filmography ==
Film
Year	Title	Role	Notes
1965	Dark Intruder	The 1st Man	
1972	The Effect of Gamma Rays on Man-in-the-Moon Marigolds	Floyd Hunsdorfer	
1974	Man on a Swing	Man in Motel	
1976	Diary of the Dead	Fergy	
1976	All the President's Men	Assistant Metro Editor #4	
1977	Airport '77	Commander Guay	
1977	The Greatest	Colonel Cedrich	
1977	Looking for Mr. Goodbar	Doctor	
1978	The Betsy	Mark Sampson	
1979	The Onion Field	Detective Glenn Bates	
1979	The Last Word	Ellinger	
1979	Being There	Wilson	
1980	The Hunter	Captain Spota	
1981	Looker	Cindy's Father	
1982	Missing	U.S. Ambassador	
1986	Touch and Go	Gower	
1986	Heartbreak Ridge	Colonel Myers	
1987	The Sicilian	Cardinal of Palermo	
1990	Navy SEALs	Admiral Colker	
1992	Scent of a Woman	William Slade	
1994	Imaginary Crimes	Judge Klein	
1996	Courage Under Fire	Don Boylar	
1997	Red Corner	Ambassador Reed	
2001	Series 7: The Contenders	Franklin James	(final film role)

== Television ==
TV
Year	Title	Role	Notes
1958	Playhouse 90	Passerby	Episode "Seven Against the Wall"
1976	The Practice	Mr. Miller	Episode "Jules and Eddie"
1976	Helter Skelter	Police Inspector	
1978	Wheels	Arenson	
1979	From Here to Eternity	Colonel Delbart	
1980	Rape and Marriage: The Rideout Case	Judge Richard Barber	
1981	The Best Little Girl in the World	Dr. Neil Holzer	
1982	The Executioner's Song	Earl Dorius	
1983	The Thorn Birds	Harry Gough	
1983	Cocaine: One Man's Seduction	Dan Hatten	
1984	Steambath	Dr. Eglin	Episode "The Big Bang"
1985	Street Hawk	Commander Leo Altobelli	13 episodes
1985	Golden Girls	Milton	1 episode
1986	Second Serve	Dr. David Radley	
1986	As Summers Die	Brevard Holt	
1987	Billionaire Boys Club	Nelson Prescott	
1987	The Days and Nights of Molly Dodd	Edgar Bickford	
1990	L.A. Law	Abe Lassen	Episode "Bound for Glory"
1991–2000	Law & Order	Douglas Greer	
1993	The Boys	Al Kozarian	
1993	The Adventures of Brisco County, Jr.	Mack Brackman	Episode "Showdown"
1995	Truman (1995 film)	J. Lester Perry	
