= My Life with Jacqueline Kennedy =

1969 memoir by Mary Barelli Gallagher

- Author: Frances Spatz Leighton, Mary Barelli Gallagher
- Language: English
- Genre: Memoir
- Publication date: 1969
- Publication place: United States

My Life with Jacqueline Kennedy is a 1969 memoir by Mary Barelli Gallagher (1927 – 2022), ghostwritten by Frances Spatz Leighton. Gallagher worked as a secretary for John F. Kennedy during his first term as Senator for Massachusetts, for Janet Norton Lee Auchincloss, and for First Lady of the United States Jacqueline Kennedy Onassis before and during the Presidency of John F. Kennedy. The memoir was generally negatively critically received.

== Memoir ==
Mary Barelli Gallagher served as Jacqueline Kennedy's secretary from 1957 to 1964. She wrote My Life with Jacqueline Kennedy about her time working for Kennedy and it was published in 1969 by the David McKay Company. Frances Spatz Leighton worked with Gallagher for six months to condense her 700-page memoir into a 396-page book. The New York Times called the book "a worm's-eye view of history commercially packaged by a backstairs ghost." The reviewer continued to note that Gallagher provided "the venom" and "details" to Leighton, who "blended them together with the precision of a hack." They concluded that the book offered no "fresh insights" and attempted to engage in character assassination and was made "to make a buck and settle scores."

A reviewer for The St. Louis Post-Dispatch called the book "depressing" and wrote that it had "colorless" style with "a few moving scenes." In a review titled "Hell hath no fury like a secretary", James Brady gave the book a very negative review, beginning by writing that "no gentleman could have written such a book and no lady would have," and concluding that "[t]here's a good book to be written about Jacqueline Bouvier Kennedy Onassis. But this isn't it."
