= Elizabeth Jaffray =

American employed as a servant at the White House (1860–1934)

Elizabeth Jaffray (December 26, 1860, in Canada West – May 2, 1934, in Ontario, Canada) was an American employed as a servant at the White House in the early 20th century.

Jaffray was retained as White House head housekeeper in 1909, a position then equivalent to that of a majordomo. Recruited from an "exclusive New York employment bureau", she became the first female chief servant in White House history. One of Jaffray's earliest, and most controversial, moves was to order the segregation of dining among White House staff. Prior to Jaffray, Caucasian and African-American butlers and valets would dine together, while lower-ranked servants such as maids and footmen would dine separately, though also at a racially integrated table. Jaffrey ordered that the two dining tables be arranged by race, instead of rank. When servants rebelled against the move she threatened mass firings, gaining their ultimate obedience. During her time at the White House she came to be regarded by employees as "a real terror".

According to Major Archibald Butt, the aide de camp to President William Howard Taft, Jaffray claimed to have "seen and felt" the ghost of a child she believed was William Wallace Lincoln on several occasions in 1912, around the fiftieth anniversary of his death. The same year she would fret over the corpulent Taft's eating habits, prompting him to promise to go on a diet.

Jaffray used horses as a means of transport longer than anyone else at the White House, continuing to be driven in a brougham for her daily shopping excursions into the mid 1920s.

Jaffray remained at the White House for 17 years and left in 1926 during the presidency of Calvin Coolidge. Jaffray had reportedly become disgusted by Coolidge's austere spending on White House entertaining; Coolidge, in turn, referred to Jaffray by the nickname "queenie". Grace Coolidge expressed relief at Jaffray's departure, musing that "she has come to consider herself the permanent resident and the President and his family transients". Following her departure Jaffray wrote Secrets of the White House. Published by Cosmopolitan, the book was a tell-all about her time at the executive mansion. She was portrayed by Cloris Leachman in the 1979 NBC mini-series Backstairs at the White House.

She died May 2, 1934, and is buried in an unmarked grave in Ontario, Canada.
