= Backstairs at the White House =

1979 film by Michael O'Herlihy

- Based on: My Thirty Years Backstairs at the White House by Lillian Rogers Parks
- Teleplay by: Gwen Bagni; Paul Dubov
- Directed by: Michael O'Herlihy
- Opening theme: Morton Stevens
- Ending theme: Morton Stevens
- Composer: Morton Stevens
- Country of origin: United States
- No. of seasons: 1
- No. of episodes: 4

Production
- Executive producer: Ed Friendly
- Producers: Ed Friendly; Michael O'Herlihy
- Production company: Ed Friendly Productions Inc.

Original release
- Network: NBC
- Release: January 29 – February 19, 1979

Backstairs at the White House is a 1979 NBC television miniseries based on the 1961 book My Thirty Years Backstairs at the White House by Lillian Rogers Parks (with Frances Spatz Leighton). The series, produced by Ed Friendly Productions, is the story of behind-the-scenes workings of the White House and the relationship between the staff and the First Families.

This mini-series was nominated for 11 Emmy Awards in 31st Primetime Emmy Awards, winning for Outstanding Achievement in Make-up (Mark Bussan, Tommy Cole and Ron Walters) and nominated for Outstanding Limited Series (Ed Friendly, Executive Producer; Ed Friendly, Producer; Michael O'Herlihy, Producer), Best Actress (Olivia Cole), Best Actor (Louis Gossett Jr.), Best Supporting Actress (both Eileen Heckart and Celeste Holm), Best Supporting Actor (both Ed Flanders and Robert Vaughn), Outstanding Teleplay (Part 1) (Gwen Bagni and Paul Dubov), Outstanding Art Direction/Set Decoration (Part 1) (Richard Y. Haman, Art Director; Anne D. McCulley, Set Decorator), and Outstanding Achievement in Hairstyling (Susan Germaine, Lola Kemp and Vivian McAteer).

The series was notable for its all-star cast: Leslie Uggams starred as Lillian Rogers Parks and Olivia Cole played her mother Maggie Rogers. Other White House staffers were played by Louis Gossett Jr., Robert Hooks, Cloris Leachman, Leslie Nielsen, and Hari Rhodes. The first episode featured Paul Winfield as Emmett Rogers Sr.

== Production ==
Producer Ed Friendly acquired the production rights to the book My Thirty Years Backstairs at the White House by Lillian Rogers Parks and Frances Spatz Leighton in 1977 after being contacted by a New York literary agent. The book had been on the New York Times best-seller list for 26 weeks and serialized by more than 100 newspapers and publications. The 187-page treatment was written by Gwen Bagni and Paul Dubov based on the book and interviews with Ms. Rogers. Bagni and Dubov won a Writer's Guild Award for the teleplay in 1980 in the category of Television: Long Form-Multi Part. Dubov died from cancer before the award ceremony and was presented the award posthumously. The teleplay was subsequently published as a book entitled Backstairs at the White House: A Novel in 1978.

Michael O'Herlihy co-produced and directed the series, and Morton Stevens was its composer. O'Herlihy and Stevens had worked with Ed Friendly on several previous projects.

Elaborate recreations of the White House, including the First Family's residence and servants' quarters, were built at Samuel Goldwyn Studios. Author Lillian Rogers Parks could find no fault in the sets when she visited them in 1978. Richard Y. Haman (Art Director) and Anne D. McCulley (Set Decorator) received Emmy nominations for their creations for the miniseries. When shooting was concluded, an effort was made to find homes for the White House sets, but Ed Friendly was turned down by the studios and universities he approached. Other than $40,000 worth of doors taken by UCLA, the sets were bulldozed and sent to landfills, much to the disgust of Friendly.

== Casting ==
Casting commenced early 1978 with first casting announcements of Leslie Uggams as Lillian Rogers Parks, Olivia Cole as her mother Maggie Rogers, Louis Gossett Jr. as White House staff member Mercer, Cloris Leachman as the White House head housekeeper, Julie Harris as Mrs. Helen Taft, Robert Vaughn as President Woodrow Wilson, Celeste Holm as Mrs. Florence Harding, and William Conrad as President William Howard Taft. Victor Buono later replaced William Conrad in that role. The first episode featured Paul Winfield as Emmett Rogers Sr.. Gregory Itzin appeared in his first (uncredited) television role as a White House tour guide.

== Cast ==
- Rogers/Parks Family
  - Olivia Cole as Maggie Rogers
  - Leslie Uggams as Lillian Rogers Parks
  - Paul Winfield as Emmett Rogers Sr.
  - Kevin Hooks as Emmett Rogers Jr.
  - Harrison Page as Wheatley Parks
- Presidents and First Ladies
  - Victor Buono as William Howard Taft
  - Julie Harris as Helen (Nellie) Taft
  - Robert Vaughn as Woodrow Wilson
  - Kim Hunter as Ellen Axson Wilson
  - Claire Bloom as Edith Bolling Galt Wilson
  - George Kennedy as Warren G. Harding
  - Celeste Holm as Florence Harding
  - Ed Flanders as Calvin Coolidge
  - Lee Grant as Grace Coolidge
  - Larry Gates as Herbert Hoover
  - Jan Sterling as Lou Hoover
  - John Anderson as Franklin D. Roosevelt
  - Eileen Heckart as Eleanor Roosevelt
  - Harry Morgan as Harry S. Truman
  - Estelle Parsons as Bess Truman
  - Andrew Duggan as Dwight D. Eisenhower
  - Barbara Barrie as Mamie Eisenhower
- White House Staff
  - Louis Gossett Jr. as Houseman Levi Mercer
  - Robert Hooks as Doorman John Mays
  - Leslie Nielsen as Chief Usher Ike Hoover
  - Hari Rhodes as Butler Coates
  - Bill Overton as Doorman Jackson
  - David Downing as Butler Dixon
  - Helena Carroll as First Maid Annie Gilhooley
  - Cloris Leachman as Mrs. Elizabeth Jaffray
  - James A. Watson Jr. as Houseman Fraser
  - Diane Shalet as Housekeeper Long
  - Louise Latham as Housekeeper Nesbitt
  - Richard Roat as Chief Usher Howell Crim
  - Marged Wakeley as Housekeeper Walker

== Plot summary ==
=== Part 1: Presidents Taft, Wilson, Harding ===
Taft: Watching John F. Kennedy's inauguration on television, Lillian Rogers Parks (Leslie Uggams) recalls the times she and her mother, Maggie Rogers (Olivia Cole), spent working as domestic staff in the White House. In 1909, Maggie supports her two children as a maid and hairdresser because her absentee husband Emmett Rogers (Paul Winfield) cannot be depended on to support them. She secures a job at the White House during the administration of William Howard Taft (Victor Buono). Mrs. Elizabeth Jaffray (Cloris Leachman), the Head Housekeeper, informs Maggie that she will be hairdresser for First Lady Helen "Nellie" Taft (Julie Harris) and is the first black woman to serve in the First Family's living quarters. Chief Usher Ike Hoover (Leslie Nielsen) introduces Maggie to the White House staff including Houseman Levi Mercer (Louis Gossett Jr.) and Doorman & Presidential Barber John Mays (Robert Hooks). They all instruct her in the etiquette of keeping the First Family's private lives from the outside world, though not necessarily from gossip among the White House staff. Mrs. Taft is pleased with how Maggie does her hair. Maggie first meets President Taft when she discovers her ten-year-old daughter Lillian Rogers (Tania Johnson) eating ice cream with him. When Nellie has a stroke, President Taft and Maggie help her learn to speak again. Lillian (Leslie Uggams), older now and crippled in one leg from polio, takes in work as a seamstress. Maggie keeps her busy and employed with small work orders from the White House.

Wilson: In 1913, President Woodrow Wilson (Robert Vaughn) and his family moves into the White House. First Lady Ellen Wilson (Kim Hunter) declares herself to be a "crusader for Negroes" and even visits Maggie at her small apartment. Mrs. Wilson dies in 1914 and the President is grief-stricken. Eventually, he marries Edith Bolling Galt (Claire Bloom) to the relief of the White House staff who are worried by his depression. Lillian begins working in the White House as a seamstress but is not allowed to work as a domestic servant due to her disability. When the United States enters World War I Maggie's son Emmett Rogers Jr. (Kevin Hooks) enlists and fights on the Western Front in Europe. He returns home permanently injured by a poison gas attack. The family is distraught when news arrives that Emmett Rogers Sr. has died. When President Wilson suffers a debilitating stroke in 1919, Senator Albert B. Fall (John Randolph) tells him the Senate is praying for him. "Which way?" replies Wilson. The First Lady takes over and manages the Executive branch for the remainder of his second term.

Harding: President Warren G. Harding (George Kennedy) and First Lady Florence Harding (Celeste Holm) are briefly introduced at the end of Part 1. President Harding orders spittoons for every room of the White House while Mrs. Harding (an avid mystic) tells Maggie she feels Maggie can be trusted because she has "good vibes."

=== Part 2: Presidents Harding (continued), Coolidge, Hoover ===
Harding (continued): Gullible President Harding is manipulated by the scheming Ohio Gang in his cabinet led by Attorney General Harry Daugherty (Barry Sullivan). His administration is plagued by corruption, eventually leading to the Teapot Dome Scandal. The staff keeps to itself the knowledge of his multiple mistresses and the liquor smuggled into the White House during Prohibition. Maggie, as always, refuses to believe any bad rumors about the First Family. Problems mount when Vice President Calvin Coolidge (Ed Flanders) refuses to tell the President how he will vote in an upcoming Senate showdown. Two administration aides commit suicide when implicated in the corruption scandals. The staff is cleaning the White House when they hear that President Harding has died in San Francisco while he and the First Lady are on a western coast goodwill tour.

Coolidge: Calvin Coolidge and his wife, Grace Coolidge (Lee Grant) arrive at the White House in 1923. President Coolidge introduces the staff to his stringent cost-cutting ways as he micro-manages the household expenses, including how and what to prepare in the kitchen. Due to staff retirements, Maggie has now moved up to the position of First Maid. Lillian begins buying things for the apartment on credit (as everyone else in the country is also doing).

President Coolidge may be tight-fisted when running the household, but he is a loving family man to his wife and two sons. When their younger son dies of blood poisoning, Coolidge and Grace are grief-stricken for more than a year. Mrs. Jaffray, who has tormented Maggie over the years, is fired when the President catches her verbally abusing the staff. Coolidge confides to Grace that he fears the economy is overheated and leading to a depression, but he is unwilling to force his policy of personal frugality on the rest of the nation. Maggie worries about Lillian dating a string of men and frequenting speakeasies. Lillian rejects Maggie's offer to find her a job at the White House. Coolidge chooses not to run for a new term and Herbert Hoover (Larry Gates) is elected president.

Hoover: In 1929, President Herbert Hoover (Larry Gates) and First Lady Lou Hoover (Jan Sterling) take up residence in the White House. The Great Depression has dealt a death blow to the economy. Emmett Jr. has moved to Arizona for his health. Lillian loses her jobs at the dress shop and movie theatre, and the household items she bought on credit are repossessed. Swallowing her pride Lillian takes a job as a maid at the White House where First Maid Maggie indoctrinates her on how to behave in the White House. She makes Lillian work harder than the rest of the staff to dispel suspicions of nepotism. The Hoovers communicate as little as possible with the staff, with the First Lady using her fingers to signify "Come," "Quiet," and "Go." Lillian is instructed by the First Lady to perform only "light work" from now on.

=== Part 3: Presidents Hoover (continued), Franklin Roosevelt ===
Hoover (continued): Maggie continues to work Lillian especially hard. Lillian resents it, but Maggie tells her times are hard and many people would be glad to have her job. Times get harder when the staff is informed they are all going to have their pay cut. Despite Hoover's efforts, the banks close their doors and Maggie loses her life savings. After an attack on the President, the staff is informed they now must keep out of sight whenever the President or the First Lady walks through the White House. Maggie takes in fellow staff member Houseman Fraser (James A. Watson Jr.) as a boarder for extra income. The Bonus Army of World War I veterans descend on Washington and are referred to by the First Lady as "communists fomenting revolution." Roy Clayton (James Crittenden), an army buddy of Emmett Jr.'s, describes the deplorable conditions in the Bonus Army encampment to Maggie, Lillian, and Fraser. On President Hoover's orders, the Army attacks and drives out the men, women and children in the Bonus Army camp before burning it and all their possessions to the ground. Maggie collapses from the increased work load at the White House. The staff does not regret to see the Hoovers depart without fanfare.

Roosevelt: The loud and boisterous family of President Franklin D. Roosevelt (John Anderson) and his wife Eleanor Roosevelt (Eileen Heckart) are greeted by the staff in 1933. The staff is impressed with the First Lady's energy and openness, a complete reversal from the Hoover administration. When President Roosevelt discovers Lillian is also a victim of polio, he tells her to take the elevator from now on, even if he is riding it. While Maggie recuperates at home Lillian tells her gossip about the First Family. Maggie disapproves and reminds her that the First Family's private lives are strictly confidential and not to be repeated.

Howell Crim (Richard Roat) is now Chief Usher. Housekeeper Nesbitt (Louise Latham) is also new to the staff, replacing Housekeeper Long. She assigns Lillian the task of breaking in the new maids. Lillian meets and secretly marries Wheatley Parks (Harrison Page). They do not tell Maggie until they move into her apartment. The White House becomes so crowded with guests that the First Lady moves into Lillian's upstairs sewing room. Relations between Lillian and Wheatley become strained due to the long hours she is putting in preparing for a visit from King George VI and Queen Elizabeth of England. Maggie retires in March 1939 and is given a gold watch in recognition for her thirty years of service in the White House. Mercer offers to walk her out, but she replies, "No, I want to go out the way I came in; by myself." The staff listens to the radio broadcast of President Roosevelt declaring war on Japan after the attack on Pearl Harbor. Lillian is soon making blackout curtains for the White House. Wheatley enlists in the army and tells Lillian he will be leaving her when he gets back from the war. Just like her mother, Lillian is married to the White House. Houseman Fraser also enlists and stops by the apartment to say good-bye to Maggie and give her his ration stamps. The episode concludes with President Roosevelt discussing Japanese victories in the South Pacific.

=== Part 4: Presidents Roosevelt (continued), Truman, Eisenhower ===
Roosevelt (continued): Many of the staff are showing the mental and physical signs of old age. Eleanor Roosevelt summons Maggie out of retirement to help with the visit of Madame Chiang Kai-Chek. Maggie comments to Mercer how rundown the White House is looking but he tells her there is no money for repairs. Lillian pleads with her mother to rest more but Maggie refuses. When she collapses on the stairs Maggie asks to be taken home. Maggie tells Lillian, "Don't let that White House swallow you." Chief Usher Crim informs the staff that Fraser has been killed in a London air raid and adds his name to the list of staff members who have died for their country. President Roosevelt's health is declining. He discovers Lillian in his bedroom repairing the curtains and they discuss the deterioration of the White House. Roosevelt says he may come back as a ghost for a visit when his time comes.

Truman: President Roosevelt is dead. Lillian sternly scolds the staff for making fun of newly-sworn in President Harry Truman (Harry Morgan) and First Lady Bess Truman (Estelle Parsons), just as her mother would have done. To cut down expenses, the Trumans reduce staff meals to one a day. The elderly mothers of both the President and First Lady move into the White House and require special treatment. Housekeeper Nesbitt is fired by the First Lady for refusing to give her a stick of rationed butter. She is replaced by Housekeeper Walker (Marged Wakeley). Hitler dies in Berlin and two nuclear bombs on Japan bring World War II to an end. Lillian is concerned that Maggie is not taking proper care of herself, spending too much time working on her White House scrapbook. The First Family moves to Blair House when the White House starts to collapse from lack of repairs. While repairs are in progress only Mercer and Mays are kept on while the rest of the staff are let go. Lillian is re-hired by First Lady Bess as a seamstress after the President narrowly wins the election. From the window of her upstairs sewing room she witnesses an assassination attempt on President Truman. The President shows his courage by refusing to cancel his scheduled speech at Arlington despite the assassination attempt. As Truman leaves the White House on the last day of his term, Mercer tells him, "Mr. President, sir, you've got class."

Eisenhower: Dwight D Eisenhower (Andrew Duggan), in total disrespect of tradition, orders the portraits of President Roosevelt and President Truman removed from the main entrance hall. The President and First Lady Mamie Eisenhower (Barbara Barrie) refuse to speak directly with staff and communicate with them through intermediaries. The First Lady prefers fashion designers for making her dresses, so Lillian is demoted to repairing linens and curtains. At times the Eisenhowers can be personable; the President asks Lillian to sample his home-made soup and the First Lady throws a surprise birthday party for her, but most of the time the old guard of Lillian, Mercer, and Mays feel unnoticed and underappreciated. Before she dies, Maggie tells Mercer, "You see that Lillian writes my book now." Mercer and Lillian retire before the Kennedy administration takes office. On Lillian's last day Housekeeper Walker asks what she is going to do now. Lillian replies, "I'm going to write a book."

== Awards ==
This mini-series was nominated for 11 Emmy Awards (winning in 1 category), 1 Golden Globe Award, and 1 Writers Guild of America Award.

=== 31st Primetime Emmy Awards ===
- Won
  - Outstanding Achievement in Make-up (Mark Bussan, Tommy Cole and Ron Walters).
- Nominations
  - Outstanding Limited Series (Ed Friendly, Executive Producer; Ed Friendly, Producer; Michael O'Herlihy, Producer),
  - Best Actress (Olivia Cole),
  - Best Actor (Louis Gossett Jr.),
  - Best Supporting Actress (Eileen Heckart),
  - Best Supporting Actress (Celeste Holm),
  - Best Supporting Actor (Ed Flanders),
  - Best Supporting Actor (Robert Vaughn),
  - Outstanding Teleplay (Part 1) (Gwen Bagni and Paul Dubov),
  - Outstanding Art Direction/Set Decoration (Part 1) (Richard Y. Haman, Art Director; Anne D. McCulley, Set Decorator),
  - Outstanding Achievement in Hairstyling (Susan Germaine, Lola Kemp and Vivian McAteer)

=== 37th Golden Globe Awards ===
- Nominations
  - Best Television Series, Drama

=== Writers Guild of America Award ===
- Won
  - Multi-Part Long Form Series and/or Any Production of More Than Two Parts: Backstairs at the White House (teleplay by Gwen Bagni and Paul Dubov)

== Home media ==
Acorn Media released the mini-series on Region 1 DVD on November 1, 2005.

Filmverlag Fernsehjuwelen released the DVD in Germany (October 30, 2015) and Austria (December 2015) using the title Weißes Haus, Hintereingang.
