= James T. Molloy =

Last Doorkeeper of the House of Representatives

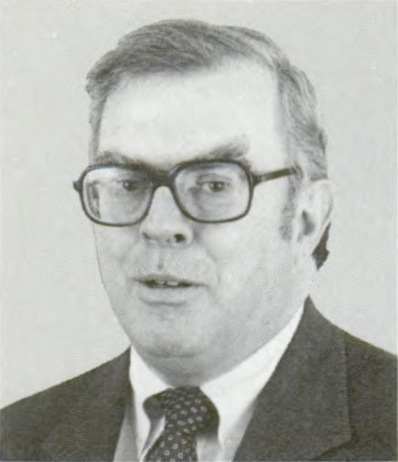
James T. Molloy

James Thomas Molloy (June 3, 1936 – July 19, 2011) was elected Doorkeeper of the House of Representatives during the 93rd Congress in 1974 and served through the 103rd Congress. As Doorkeeper, he introduced six Presidents, several heads of state and other dignitaries in joint sessions and other congressional events. Molloy was the last Doorkeeper of the House of Representatives.

== Biography ==
=== Early life ===
James T. Molloy was born in South Buffalo, Buffalo, New York in 1936 to Matthew Molloy and Catherine Hayden Molloy. Educated in Buffalo, New York in Catholic schools, he worked in the grain elevators of Buffalo's waterfront and fought fires as a member of the city fire department. He worked his own way through Canisius College, becoming a member of the AFL–CIO, the International Brotherhood of Longshoremen, and the International Association of Fire Fighters.

=== Career ===
Molloy worked as a schoolteacher in the New York cities of Buffalo and Lackawanna, and at the age of 27, became the youngest Democrat to serve as Party Zone Chairman in the State of New York. He went to Washington, D.C. in 1968 at the invitation of New York Congressman John Rooney to work in the House Finance Office. During his years of work in that office, he oversaw the growth of legislative appropriations for the House from $75 million to $126 million. He was elected Doorkeeper of the House in 1974, and remained at that post through the 103rd Congress, serving as a primary aide to Speakers Carl Albert, Tip O'Neill, Jim Wright, and Tom Foley. He was the last of 30 people to hold the position of Doorkeeper from its establishment in 1789 to its elimination in 1994. In this capacity, he introduced Presidents and heads of state to Congress, and coordinated 71 joint sessions and many other events within the House chamber.

Terms served as the Doorkeeper of the House
Term	Years	Start date
93rd	1973–1975	3 January 1973
94th	1975–1977	14 January 1975
95th	1977–1979	4 January 1977
96th	1979–1981	15 January 1979
97th	1981–1983	5 January 1981
98th	1983–1985	3 January 1983
99th	1985–1987	3 January 1985
100th	1987–1989	6 January 1987
101st	1989–1991	3 January 1989
102nd	1991–1993	3 January 1991
103rd	1993–1995	5 January 1993

== Legacy ==
Molloy continued to serve as Chairman of the Board of the Wright Patman Congressional Credit Union, a position he held for 30 years. Molloy was the recipient of numerous honors for his life's work in public service. He received the Outstanding Citizen Award from the New York State AFL–CIO, the President's Award from the New York State Federation of Police, and the United States Senate Youth Alumni Association Outstanding Service Award. He received an honorary Doctor of Laws from his alma mater, Canisius College, as well as the Sid Yudain Congressional Staffer of the Year Award from Roll Call.

== Death ==
Molloy died of complications of diabetes in Rochester, New York on July 19, 2011, aged 75.
