= Doorkeeper of the United States House of Representatives =

Former parliamentary officer

An appointed officer of the United States House of Representatives from 1789 until 1995, the doorkeeper of the United States House of Representatives was chosen by a resolution at the opening of each United States Congress. The Office of the Doorkeeper was based on precedent from the Continental Congresses. Without debate, the first federal Congress created the doorkeeper's position by resolution on April 2, 1789. The doorkeeper controlled access to the House chamber and eventually oversaw the press in the gallery.

The doorkeeper's most visible job was introducing American presidents and foreign dignitaries to Congress. For 18 years, before the State of the Union address, Doorkeeper James T. Molloy announced, "Mister Speaker, the president of the United States."

The Office of the Doorkeeper was abolished during the 104th Congress (Pub. L. 104–186 (text) (PDF)) in an effort to save money. Thirty-three doorkeepers served until the position was abolished and the office's duties were divided among the sergeant at arms, the clerk of the House, and the newly created chief administrative officer.

== List of doorkeepers ==
Two doorkeepers also served as members of the United States House of Representatives (indicated below by asterisks) either prior to or after their service as a House officer.

Congress (years)	Doorkeepers, state or territory	Date elected
1st (1789–91)	Gifford Dalley, NY	April 4, 1789
2nd (1791–93)	Gifford Dalley, NY	October 24, 1791
3rd (1793–95)	Gifford Dalley, NY	December 2, 1793
4th (1795–97)	Thomas Claxton, CT	December 7, 1795
5th (1797–99)	Thomas Claxton, CT	May 15, 1797
6th (1799-1801)	Thomas Claxton, CT	December 2, 1799
7th (1801–03)	Thomas Claxton, CT	December 7, 1801
8th (1803–05)	Thomas Claxton, CT	October 17, 1803
9th (1805–07)	Thomas Claxton, CT	December 2, 1805
10th (1807–09)	Thomas Claxton, CT	October 27, 1807
11th (1809–11)	Thomas Claxton, CT	May 22, 1809
12th (1811–13)	Thomas Claxton, CT	November 4, 1811
13th (1813–15)	Thomas Claxton, CT	May 24, 1813
14th (1815–17)	Thomas Claxton, CT	December 4, 1815
15th (1817–19)	Thomas Claxton, CT	December 1, 1817
16th (1819–21)	Thomas Claxton, CT	December 6, 1819
17th (1821–23)	Benjamin Birch, MD	December 4, 1821
18th (1823–25)	Benjamin Birch, MD	December 1, 1823
19th (1825–27)	Benjamin Birch, MD	December 5, 1825
20th (1827–29)	Benjamin Birch, MD	December 3, 1827
21st (1829–31)	Benjamin Birch, MD	December 7, 1829
22nd (1831–33)	Overton Carr, MD	December 7, 1831
23rd (1833–35)	Overton Carr, MD	December 3, 1833
24th (1835–37)	Overton Carr, MD	December 15, 1835
25th (1837–39)	Overton Carr, MD	September 4, 1837
25th (1837–39)	Joseph Follansbee, MA	April 5, 1838
26th (1839–41)	Joseph Follansbee, MA	December 23, 1839
27th (1841–43)	Joseph Follansbee, MA	June 9, 1841
28th (1843–45)	Jesse E. Dow, CT	December 7, 1843
29th (1845–47)	Cornelius S. Whitney, DC	December 3, 1845
30th (1847–49)	Robert E. Horner, NJ	December 8, 1847
31st (1849–51)	Robert E. Horner, NJ	N/A
32nd (1851–53)	Zadock W. McKnew, MD	December 1, 1851
33rd (1853–55)	Zadock W. McKnew, MD	December 5, 1853
34th (1855–57)	Nathan Darling, NY	February 5, 1856
35th (1857–59)	Robert B. Hackney, VA	December 7, 1857
35th (1857–59)	Joseph L. Wright, NJ	May 18, 1858
36th (1859–61)	Joseph L. Wright, NJ	December 5, 1859
36th (1859–61)	George Marston, NH	February 6, 1860
37th (1861–63)	Ira Goodnow, NY	July 5, 1861
38th (1863–65)	Ira Goodnow, NY	December 8, 1863
39th (1865–67)	Ira Goodnow, NY	December 4, 1865
40th (1867–69)	Charles E. Lippincott, IL	March 5, 1867
41st (1869–71)	Otis S. Buxton, NY	March 5, 1869
42nd (1871–73)	Otis S. Buxton, NY	March 4, 1871
43rd (1873–75)	Otis S. Buxton, NY	December 1, 1873
44th (1875–77)	Lafayette H. Fitzhugh, TX	December 6, 1875
44th (1875–77)	John H. Patterson, NJ	May 26, 1876
45th (1877–79)	John W. Polk, MO	October 17, 1877
45th (1877–79)	Charles W. Field, GA	April 8, 1878
46th (1879–81)	Charles W. Field, GA	March 18, 1879
47th (1881–83)	Walter P. Brownlow, TN*	December 5, 1881
48th (1883–85)	James G. Wintersmith, TX	December 4, 1883
49th (1885–87)	Samuel Donelson, TN	December 7, 1885
50th (1887–89)	Alvin B. Hurt, MS	December 5, 1887
51st (1889–91)	Charles E. Adams, MD	December 2, 1889
52nd (1891–93)	Charles H. Turner, NY*	December 8, 1891
53rd (1893–95)	Alvin B. Hurt, TN	August 7, 1893
54th (1895–97)	William J. Glenn, NY	December 2, 1895
55th (1897–99)	William J. Glenn, NY	March 15, 1897
56th (1899-1901)	William J. Glenn, NY	December 4, 1899
57th (1901–03)	William J. Glenn, NY	December 2, 1901
57th (1901–03)	Frank B. Lyon, NY	March 18, 1902
58th (1903–05)	Frank B. Lyon, NY	November 9, 1903
59th (1905–07)	Frank B. Lyon, NY	December 4, 1905
60th (1907–09)	Frank B. Lyon, NY	December 2, 1907
61st (1909–11)	Frank B. Lyon, NY	March 15, 1909
62nd (1911–13)	Joseph J. Sinnott, VA	April 4, 1911
63rd (1913–15)	Joseph J. Sinnott, VA	April 7, 1913
64th (1915–17)	Joseph J. Sinnott, VA	December 6, 1915
65th (1917–19)	Joseph J. Sinnott, VA	April 2, 1917
66th (1919–21)	Bert W. Kennedy, MI	May 19, 1919
67th (1921–23)	Bert W. Kennedy, MI	April 11, 1921
68th (1923–25)	Bert W. Kennedy, MI	December 5, 1923
69th (1925–27)	Bert W. Kennedy, MI	December 7, 1925
70th (1927–29)	Bert W. Kennedy, MI	December 5, 1927
71st (1929–31)	Bert W. Kennedy, MI	April 15, 1929
72nd (1931–33)	Joseph J. Sinnott, VA	December 7, 1931
73rd (1933–35)	Joseph J. Sinnott, VA	March 9, 1933
74th (1935–37)	Joseph J. Sinnott, VA	January 3, 1935
75th (1937–39)	Joseph J. Sinnott, VA	January 5, 1937
76th (1939–41)	Joseph J. Sinnott, VA	January 3, 1939
77th (1941–43)	Joseph J. Sinnott, VA	January 3, 1941
78th (1943–45)	Joseph J. Sinnott, VA	January 6, 1943
78th (1943–45)	Ralph R. Roberts, IN	February 5, 1943
79th (1945–47)	Ralph R. Roberts, IN	January 3, 1945
80th (1947–49)	M.L. Meletio, MO	January 3, 1947
81st (1949–51)	William M. Miller, MS	January 3, 1949
82nd (1951–53)	William M. Miller, MS	January 3, 1951
83rd (1953–55)	Tom J. Kennamer, MO	January 3, 1953
84th (1955–57)	William M. Miller, MS	January 5, 1955
85th (1957–59)	William M. Miller, MS	January 3, 1957
86th (1959–61)	William M. Miller, MS	January 7, 1959
87th (1961–63)	William M. Miller, MS	January 3, 1961
88th (1963–65)	William M. Miller, MS	January 9, 1963
89th (1965–67)	William M. Miller, MS	January 4, 1965
90th (1967–69)	William M. Miller, MS	January 10, 1967
91st (1969–71)	William M. Miller, MS	January 3, 1969
92nd (1971–73)	William M. Miller, MS	January 21, 1971
93rd (1973–75)	William M. Miller, MS	January 3, 1973
93rd (1973–75)	James T. Molloy, NY	December 31, 1974
94th (1975–77)	James T. Molloy, NY	January 14, 1975
95th (1977–79)	James T. Molloy, NY	January 4, 1977
96th (1979–81)	James T. Molloy, NY	January 15, 1979
97th (1981–83)	James T. Molloy, NY	January 5, 1981
98th (1983–85)	James T. Molloy, NY	January 3, 1983
99th (1985–87)	James T. Molloy, NY	January 3, 1985
100th (1987–89)	James T. Molloy, NY	January 6, 1987
101st (1989–91)	James T. Molloy, NY	January 3, 1989
102nd (1991–93)	James T. Molloy, NY	January 3, 1991
103rd (1993–95)	James T. Molloy, NY	January 5, 1993
