= Ron Walters (make-up artist) =

American make-up artist

- Born: November 20, 1938; New York, U.S.
- Died: October 31, 1994 (aged 55); Hollywood, California, U.S.
- Occupation: Make-up artist

Ron Walters (November 20, 1938 – October 31, 1994) was an American make-up artist. He won three Primetime Emmy Awards and was nominated for two more in the category Outstanding Makeup for his work on the television programs Backstairs at the White House, The Tracey Ullman Show and Star Trek: The Next Generation.

Walters died from complications of AIDS in Hollywood, California, on October 31, 1994, at the age of 55.
