= Lillian Rogers Parks =

White House seamstress and author (1897–1997)

- Born: February 1, 1897
- Died: November 6, 1997 (aged 100); Washington, DC, U.S.
- Occupations: housemaid; seamstress
- Writing career
- Genre: Non-fiction

Lillian Rogers Parks (February 1, 1897 – November 6, 1997) was an American housemaid and seamstress in the White House.

With the journalist Frances Spatz Leighton, co-author of a number of White House memoirs, Parks published My Thirty Years Backstairs at the White House. The book covers a 50-year period in the life of domestic staff in the White House. It reports Parks' experiences as a seamstress, and those of her mother, 'Maggie' Rogers, who served as a housemaid for thirty years. Lillian Rogers Parks was portrayed by Leslie Uggams in the 1979 miniseries Backstairs at the White House. Many of the gifts she received from presidents during her time there later became notable artifacts and collectibles associated with presidential history, eventually ending up in the Raleigh DeGeer Amyx Collection. She also published The Roosevelts: A Family in Turmoil in 1981 in collaboration with Frances Spatz Leighton. She was an honorary member of Alpha Kappa Alpha sorority.

== Publications ==
- 1961: My Thirty Years Backstairs at the White House. New York: Fleet ASIN B0007FEFI6 (with F. S. Leighton)
- 1969: It was Fun Working at the White House. New York: Fleet ISBN 978-0830300839 (with F. S. Leighton)
- 1981: The Roosevelts: A Family in Turmoil. Englewood Cliffs: Prentice-Hall ISBN 0-13-783043-2 (with F. S. Leighton)
