= Arvelia Myers =

American tennis player, coach, entrepreneur, and activist

Arvelia Myers (25 February 1927 – October 25, 2017) was an American tennis player, wife, mother, coach, entrepreneur, and activist. After excelling in the sport, she founded Pyramid Tennis, the first female-owned, African-American tennis program, in Harlem which served youth for over forty years. She was known in her community as the "mother of Harlem tennis" and was often referred to as a pioneer and activist because of the measures she took to protect her program.

== Early life ==
Arvelia Myers was born February 25, 1927, in Sunflower, Mississippi to Alexander Cage, a preacher, and Irene (née Fields). Mrs Cage, a widow, relocated the family to Memphis, Tennessee when Arvelia was seven-years-old. Eight years later, at fifteen, Arvelia married Willie Calvin Cole, and from that union, Olivia Cole was born (who rose to become an Emmy Award-winning actress for her role in "Roots"). In 1944, seventeen-year-old Arvelia moved to the Bronx, New York with her two-year-old daughter. An aunt who already lived there helped her with living arrangements in the Bronx.[2] However, she did not stay there long. Despite family members' objections, Arvelia relocated to Harlem and never left. She chose Mount Morris Presbyterian as her church home, where she served as an usher. There she found babysitting support and more. Arvelia told a tennis historian, "A young man whom I met at the Mt. Morris Church introduced me to tennis." That man, Raymond Mitchell, became her husband, in 1956, and both of them were often seen on community tennis courts perfecting their game.

In 1972, at 45-years-old, Arvelia attained a General Equivalency Diploma. Twelve years later, in 1984, at 57-years-old, she graduated from Columbia University School of General Studies with a B.A. degree in English.

== Tennis career ==
During Arvelia's tennis playing days, Jim Crow laws prohibited Blacks from competing in the United States Tennis Lawn Association tournaments, so they played on the American Tennis Association (ATA) circuit, "the only game in town," according to Arthur Ashe. Arvelia traveled on weekends to ATA tournaments on Black college campuses such as Hampton University in Virginia, Central State University in Ohio, or the Shady Rest Country Club in New Jersey. On the ATA circuit in the 1960s, Olivia was ranked as high as number three as a singles player and won doubles championship honors.

== Entrepreneurship ==
After having worked with Claude Cargill's and Bill Brown's Harlem Junior Tennis and Education Program (HJTEP) at the Harlem Armory, in 1973, Arvelia founded Pyramid Tennis, the first black female-owned tennis and education program in Harlem. Through this program, she provided tennis instruction, tennis balls, rackets, court time, and entry fees for tournaments. She recognized that for many the cost of each item was an impediment to participating in the sport. Her program eliminated that obstacle widening accessibility to a broader audience. During the summers, Pyramid Tennis conducted an outdoor junior tennis program at Fred Johnson's Park in Manhattan (150th Street and Seventh Avenue) and during the winters, an indoor program at the 369th Armory in Harlem (2366 5th Avenue).

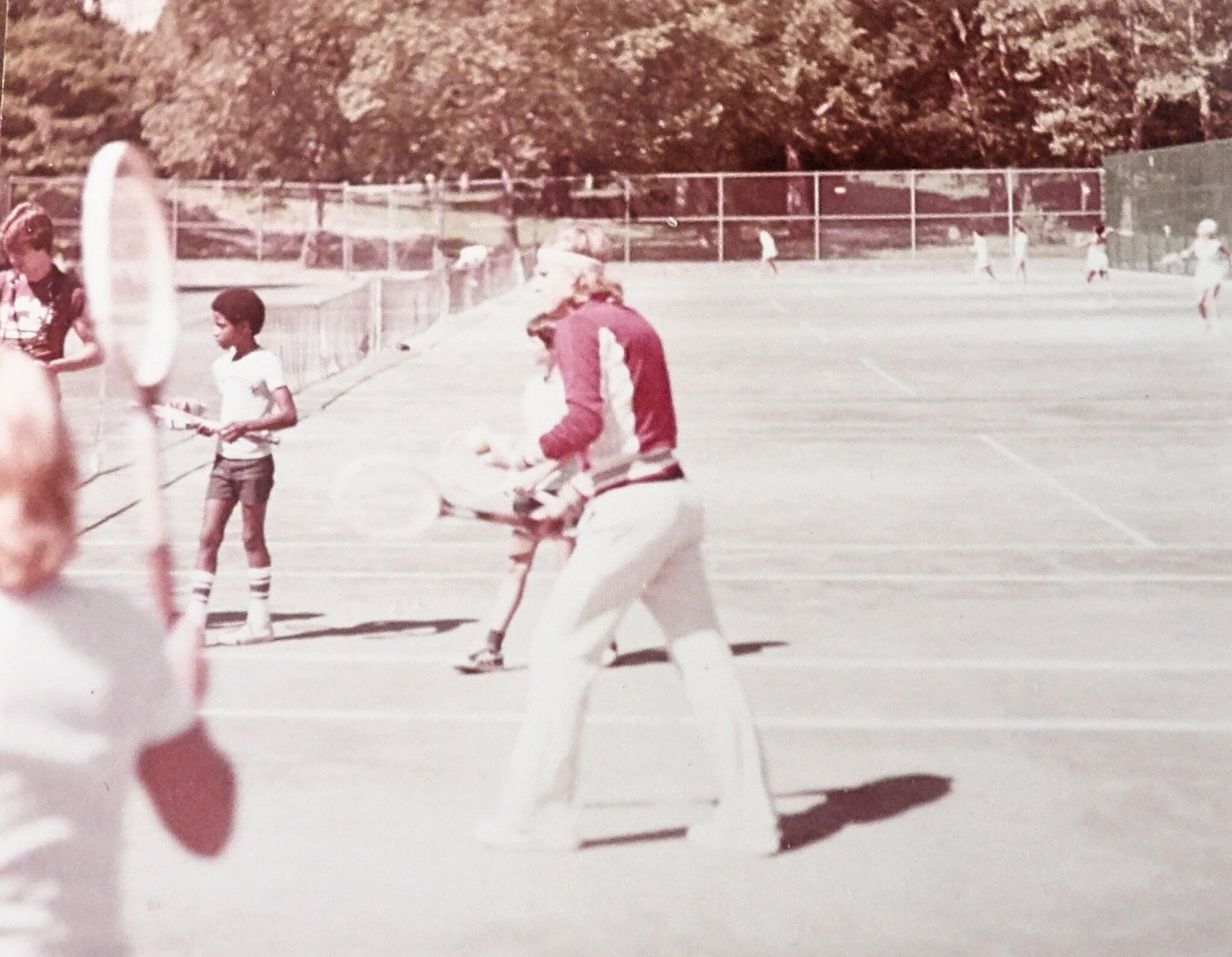
1970s--Tennis Champ Bjorn Borg giving tennis clinic in NYC's Central Park tennis courts, kids from Pyramid Tennis travel there.

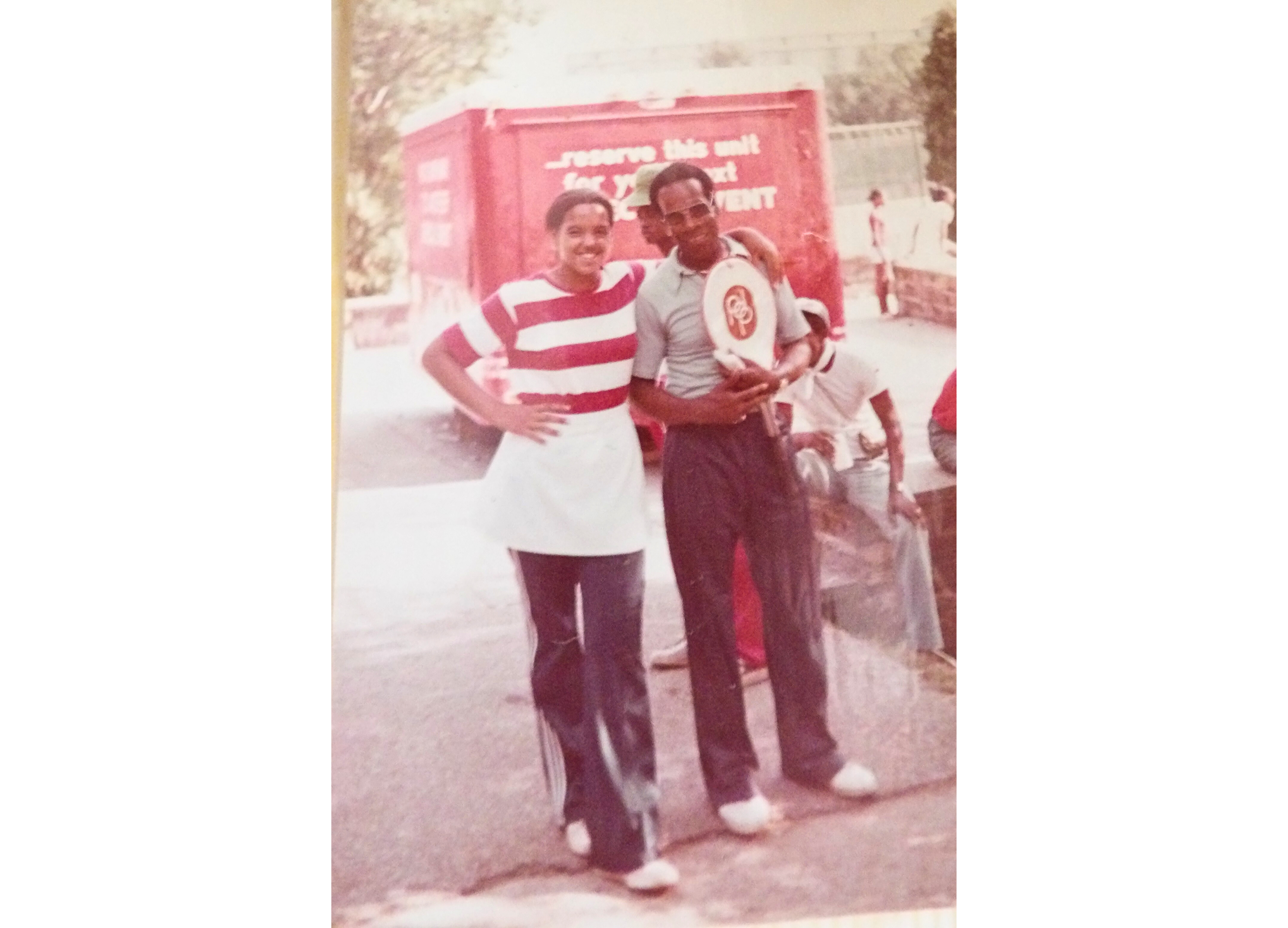
(right): Claude Cargill of the Harlem Junior Tennis Academy and junior competitor in the 14/16 & under girls at ATA tourney at Princeton University, NJ, 1970s. Junior tennis player belonged to Pyramid Tennis & Harlem Junior Tennis Academy.

Through her program, participants learned the game and the discipline required for success on the court, the classroom, and in life.

Besides the above, Arvelia partnered with City College and Columbia University as coach of their respective tennis teams and with Riverbank State Park as a youth tennis instructor. The United States Tennis Association Eastern New York Division acknowledged Myers as a "gamechanger" who promoted tennis throughout the region.

== Activism ==
The HJTEP converted the drill floor of the 369 Regiment Armory (142nd Street and 5th Avenue in Harlem) into eight tennis courts serving a wide range of sports enthusiasts. Myers regularly reserved four of those courts to conduct her Pyramid program. In 1985, when the homeless population rose in New York City, and officials decided the drill floor at the armory was the solution, Arvelia's program was in jeopardy. She appealed to the governor and city officials to devise an alternate solution, but that did not occur until David Dinkins was elected mayor. She was forced into activist mode again when the leadership at the armory decided they could increase their revenue by renting the armory to a concessionaire who could generate more funds, again jeopardizing Pyramid Tennis and other tennis programs at the site. Myers organized a coalition named the Friends of Harlem Tennis, educated the community, and pressured politicians and other stakeholders to award the contract to organizations more tennis-friendly.

During the summers, the tennis courts at Harlem's Frederick Johnson Park, known as "The Jungle" were well utilized. Known as "The Jungle" due to the high heat and humidity, some wanted to add more lawn and trees to cool it down. Adjacent to the Armory, The Jungle's tennis courts were not well maintained in the 1970s but of black historic significance--Althea Gibson played on them, and David Dinkins a good tennis player (who later became the Mayor of New York City), would frequent them. Arvelia would promote the tennis champions' free clinics to Pyramid Tennis players in the 1970s. Top tennis pros touring NYC would sometimes give free clinics in NYC public parks, the clinics often arranged just a few hours before notifying the parks. Arvelia would make calls to let everyone know of the clinics in the different public parks--some players from Pyramid Tennis would travel to other parks to follow and learn from the top players of that time that included Vitas Gerulaitis and Bjorn Borg among others. Arvelia encouraged and promoted the touring clinics given by professional tennis champs who usually one would only see on television. The courts were packed at Fred Johnson Park in Harlem for the clinics. Currently, the Fred Johnson Park tennis courts have been renovated and offer tennis programs https://www.tennisinthejungle.com.

The American Tennis Association (ATA) existed because no other tennis community welcomed early players of the game and thrived in this environment. Althea Gibson, Arthur Ashe, and Bob Ryland are among the notable few who honed their game on the ATA circuit.

Arvelia Myers was another player who competed under the banner of the ATA and elevated her game as a ranked competitor. She maintained her connection to the group and served as a member of the Board of Directors after her competitive days ended.

She grew to become protective of the organization and strove to ensure the ATA maintained its vision, value, and commitment to developing junior tennis players.

Although Myers was a stalwart of the ATA, she was also a staunch supporter of the United States Tennis Association (USTA). She received numerous awards for her voluntary service at the US Open and as secretary of the USTA Eastern Division. However, she always maintained that they were distinct brands. "It's like Avis and Hertz. You should never put the two together," she often said.

== Death ==
On October 25, 2017, Arvelia Myers died while in Jacobs Nursing Home in The Bronx, New York.

== Awards and acknowledgements ==
Myers was listed in Columbia University's 'Unsung Heroes' in their Legacy of Leadership bulletin because she made "a difference in New York City, going about [her] important work each day with little publicity". Some did notice her work, however, as her numerous awards for dedication and service prove: Harlem Junior Tennis Program Appreciation Award, USTA Community Service Award, Arthur Ashe Special Service Award, ATA Outstanding Service Award, No Ad Pioneer Award, Harlem Week/Greater Harlem Chamber of Commerce-Community Service Award, the USTA 10-year Volunteer Service Award, the ETA Louise Cilla Award, the Arvelia Myers service award, and others. She was inducted into the Black Tennis Hall of Fame posthumously on June 22, 2019.
