= Alonzo Fields =

American White House butler (1900–1994)

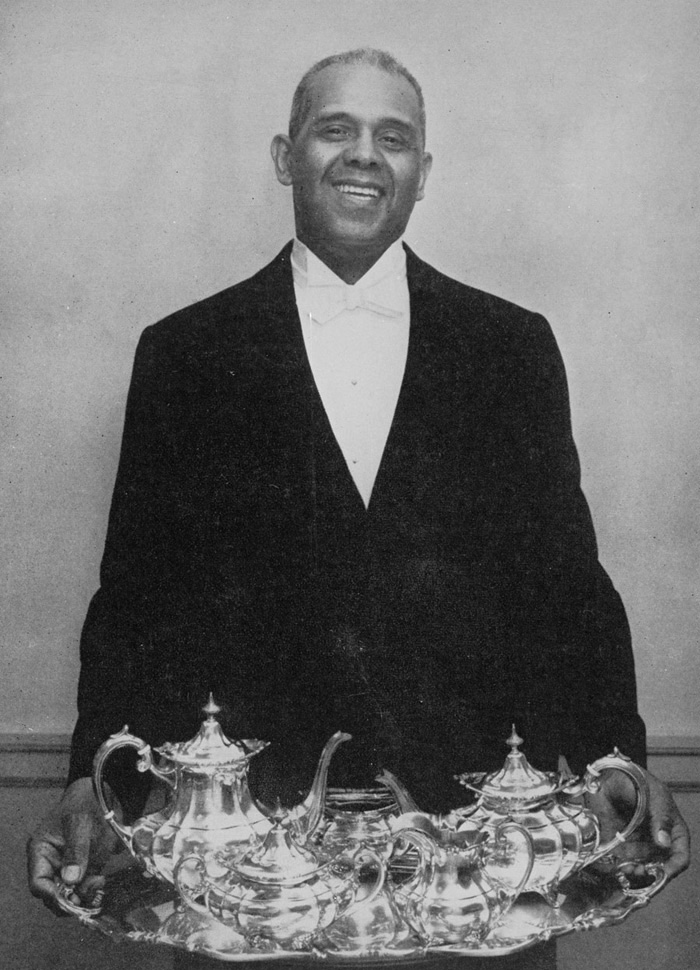
- Born: April 10, 1900; Lyles Station, Indiana, U.S.
- Died: March 22, 1994 (aged 93); Cambridge, Massachusetts
- Occupation: Butler
- Years active: 1931–1953
- Spouses: Edna Fields (died 1973); Mayland McLaughlin (m. 1980)

Alonzo Fields (April 10, 1900 – March 22, 1994) was an American butler who served at the White House for twenty-one years under presidents Hoover, Roosevelt, Truman and Eisenhower. Of those twenty-one years, twenty were spent as the White House chief butler.

== Career ==
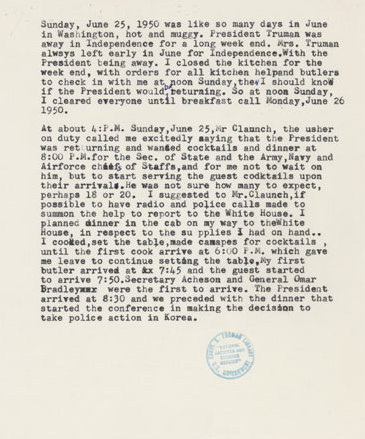
Page from Alonzo Fields's personal papers. This one describes his conducting a service-event that resulted in Truman's decision to enter the Korean War.

When Fields began his tenure at the White House in 1931, senators from the U.S. South frequently addressed him with the racially condescending term "boy", and a racial hierarchy existed between white and black White House house staff, with whites dominating. While the attitudes of most southern U.S. senators would not begin to change until the advent of the Civil Rights Movement, Roosevelt took it upon himself to remove racial tensions among the house staff by making it all black.

After his retirement in 1960, Fields published My 21 Years in the White House, in which he wove together his private papers and cryptic journals, written while serving, with his recollections. Although restrained, his memoir nonetheless provides a uniquely intimate primary source account of the U.S. presidents he served, several who came to trust Fields as a close personal friend. Fields reports, for example, that he was present when Roosevelt was first informed of the Japanese bombing of Pearl Harbor and that Roosevelt "broke down completely" during that moment, and also emitted racial slurs against the Japanese before regaining his composure. Truman was especially close with Fields and even related with him as an emotional confidant at times, and the two at one point sat together for a portrait.

== Legacy ==
More than a decade after Fields' death in 1994, his story was cast into a one-man theatrical performance, Looking Over the President's Shoulder. Historians, such as David McCullough in his 1992 biography Truman, continue to consult Fields' memoirs when constructing accounts of the presidents he served.
