= Little House on the Prairie: The Legacy of Laura Ingalls Wilder =

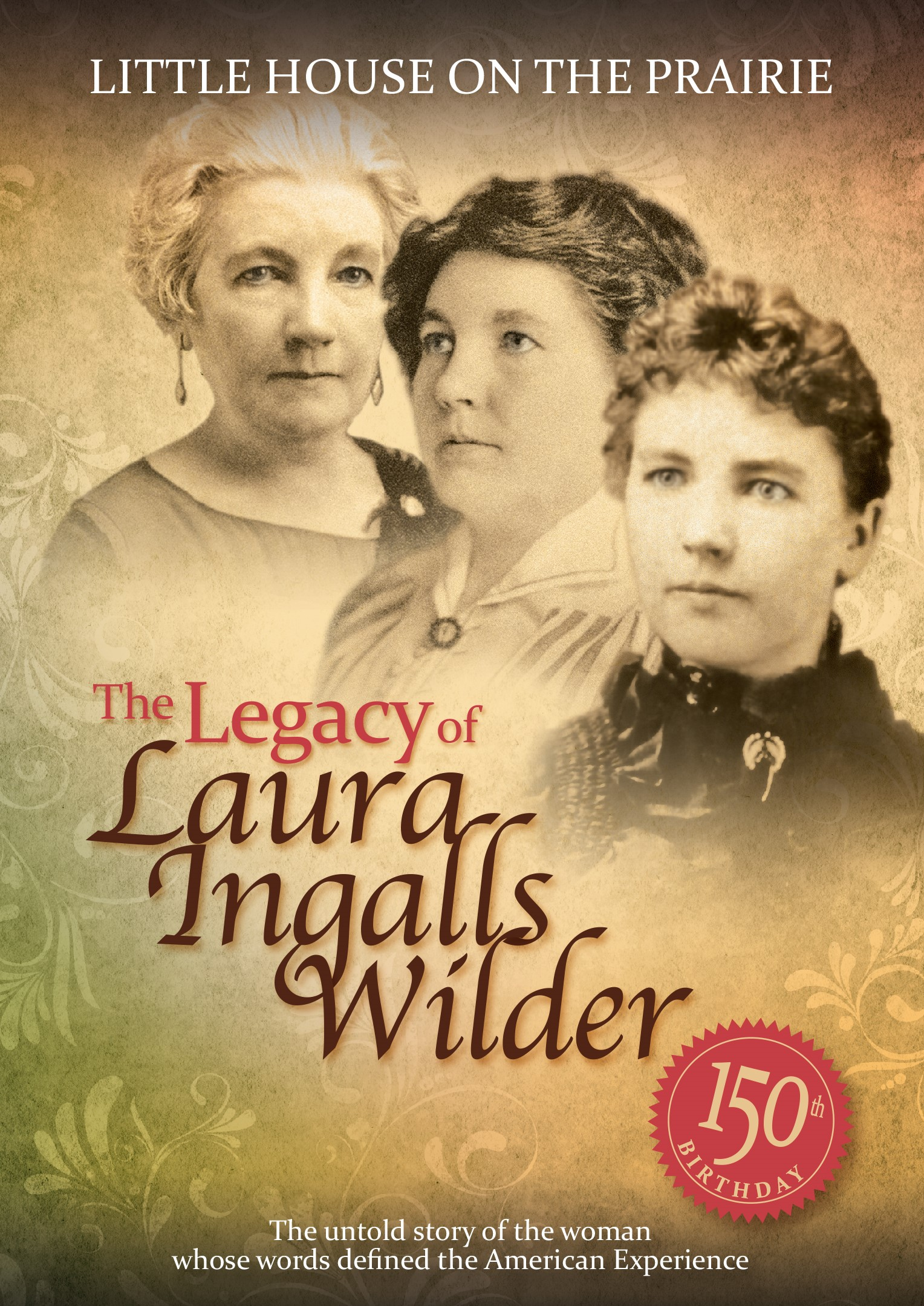
- Directed by: Dean Butler
- Produced by: Dean Butler; Robin Bernheim-Burger; Trip Friendly
- Edited by: Alexander Gittinger
- Music by: Jay Asher
- Production companies: Legacy Documentaries; Friendly Family Productions
- Release date: February 2015
- Running time: 56 minutes
- Country: United States
- Language: English

Little House on the Prairie: The Legacy of Laura Ingalls Wilder is a documentary film about the life of American author Laura Ingalls Wilder. She is best known for her Little House on the Prairie book series.

Little House on the Prairie: The Legacy of Laura Ingalls Wilder was produced by Dean Butler and Robin Bernheim-Burger, and executive produced by Trip Friendly. Butler, who portrayed Almanzo Wilder in Little House on the Prairie television series from 1979 to 1983, directed and narrated the documentary, which was released on DVD in February 2015.

== Summary ==
Wilder's personal story as a writer, wife, and mother is explored through interviews with scholars and historians, passages from the Little House on the Prairie books, archival photography, paintings by frontier artists, such as Harvey Dunn, dramatic reenactments, and original artwork.

The DVD also examines topics relating to life and culture on the prairie.

== Production ==
Dean Butler narrates and directs Little House on the Prairie: The Legacy of Laura Ingalls Wilder. Visual images include frontier paintings by artist Harvey Dunn, who was born ten miles from De Smet, South Dakota, five years after Charles Ingalls moved his family there. Illustrations by artist Cheryl Harness animate specific scenes and characters from the Little House on the Prairie books. Archival photographs from multiple sources provide a first-hand look at the people and places in Laura Ingalls Wilder's life.

Historians and academics provide commentary with interviews throughout the documentary. John E. Miller, historian and author of Becoming Laura Ingalls Wilder, adds details about Wilder's life. Pamela Smith Hill, author of Laura Ingalls Wilder: A Writer’s Life, comments on her development as a writer and her relationship with her daughter and editor, Rose Wilder Lane. Tanya Hart, a professor of history, puts the relationship of women to the law and the community in context with the time in which Laura Ingalls Wilder lived. Tai S. Edwards, professor of history, elaborates on the pioneers' perspective of the Osage Indians written about in Little House on the Prairie.

Re-enactors from the Laura Ingalls Wilder Memorial Society in De Smet, South Dakota portray the Ingalls and Wilder families, plus other characters. Robin Bernheim-Burger voices the role of Rose Wilder Lane. Katherine Cannon voices the role of Laura Ingalls Wilder and reads excerpts from the Little House on the Prairie books.

== Synopsis ==
After a brief introduction, the narrative begins in 1885 with Laura Ingalls Wilder's life as a new wife and mother. It also details the hardships she and her family endure due to crop failures, debt, and crippling illnesses. Circumstances force her family to travel from South Dakota to Minnesota to Florida and then back again to South Dakota. In 1894, the Wilder family settled on Rocky Ridge Farm in Mansfield, Missouri, where Laura and her husband, Almanzo, will live for the rest of their lives. It is during the journey to Missouri that Laura starts documenting her observations in personal journals, which become source material for her Little House on the Prairie books.

Laura Ingalls Wilder's writing career began almost by accident in 1911, when she declined to give a speech and instead had someone else read what she had written. The editor of the Missouri Ruralist magazine hears it and offers her a position as a columnist. For nine years thereafter, Laura wrote articles about farmers and farm life and, in particular, about issues important to farm women. After a time, her daughter Rose Wilder Lane, now a successful professional writer, invites Laura to San Francisco to help improve her mother's writing skills, which she does—but not without pain and effort. With Rose as her editor, Laura is published in newspapers and magazines across the country.

The documentary chronicles the difficult author/editor relationship between Laura and Rose. Rose moves back to Missouri to be close at hand as editor when Laura begins writing her first book Little House in the Big Woods. Both persevered together through the rejections and drafts until the book was finally published in 1932 when Laura was 65. However, Rose felt that her writing skills were superior to her mother's, and this led to conflict between the two. As Laura struggled to write a second novel about Almanzo Wilder called Farmer Boy and could have used Rose's help, Rose was busy writing her novel, Let the Hurricane Roar (reissued in 1976 as Young Pioneers), which she based on her mother's memoirs without asking her permission. The relationship between the two becomes strained when Laura finds this out and doesn't improve until Rose volunteers to do research for Farmer Boy.

Farmer Boy is published in 1933, and Laura and Rose continue to work together on subsequent novels, but Laura began to assert herself more as she gains experience as a writer of children's books, something that Rose is reluctant to support. In many instances, Laura refuses to take Rose’s advice, such as leaving out how her sister Mary Ingalls becomes blind and is admitted to the Iowa Braille and Sight Saving School. Instead, Laura follows her instincts about what should be included in the story and makes the incident a defining moment in By the Shores of Silver Lake. Conversely, there were real-life incidents that she purposely left out because she thought they were unsuitable for children, such as the death of her baby brother, Fredrick, when she was just 10 years old.

Drawing further upon her childhood experiences, she wrote Little House on the Prairie about life on the Kansas prairie, which was published in 1935; On the Banks of Plum Creek about Walnut Grove, Minnesota (published 1937); then four books about De Smet, South Dakota: By the Shores of Silver Lake (published 1939); The Long Winter (published 1940); Little Town on the Prairie (published 1941); and the last book of the series, about entering young adulthood, These Happy Golden Years, published in 1943.

The Little House on the Prairie book series has become known around the world. Public libraries and schools are named after Laura Ingalls Wilder. After World War II, General Douglas MacArthur had the Little House on the Prairie books translated for the Japanese people, so that they could better understand and appreciate American values and culture. In 1954, the American Library Association created the Laura Ingalls Wilder Medal, which is awarded to outstanding authors of children's literature. Laura Ingalls Wilder, at age 87, is its first recipient. In 1957, Laura Ingalls Wilder, suffering from diabetes and the loss of many loved ones, died at age 90.

== Bonus features ==
Expanding on the subject material covered in the documentary, five DVD bonus features provide additional information relating to Laura Ingalls Wilder, her world, and the making of The Legacy of Laura Ingalls Wilder. The bonus features are divided into two categories: Laura’s World and Behind the Scenes.

=== Laura's World ===
Native Americans & African Americans: Scholars and historians discuss the relationship between Native Americans and African Americans in the real and fictional worlds in which Laura Ingalls Wilder and the characters in her books grew up.

Harvey Dunn: American Artist: A Look at the Life of Harvey Dunn, a South Dakota-born artist known for his paintings inspired by a love of the prairie. Laura Ingalls Wilder, a contemporary of Harvey Dunn, kept one of his paintings above her writing desk.

The Morgan Horse: The versatile Morgan horse appears throughout the Little House on the Prairie books. The breed has been used for both show and general work, reflecting its adaptability and range of uses.

=== Behind the Scenes ===
Art & Illustration: Cheryl Harness, artist, and illustrator, describes her process for creating her original sketches and paintings used in the documentary and shares how she was inspired by the Little House on the Prairie books.

Director Travel & Conversation: Dean Butler, director of The Legacy of Laura Ingalls Wilder, recounts the locations he traveled to and the people he interacted with while constructing the documentary. He pays particular attention to members of the Laura Ingalls Wilder Memorial Society in De Smet, South Dakota, who re-enacted the roles of the main characters from the Little House on the Prairie books.

== Interview subjects ==
Scholars and historians interviewed for the documentary and bonus features include:

- Dr. Tai S. Edwards, Ph.D., Associate Professor of History, Johnson County Community College, Overland Park, Kansas
- Dr. Tanya Hart, Ph.D., Associate Professor of History, University of Kansas, Lawrence, Kansas, author of Health in the City: Race, Poverty, and the Negotiation of Women's Health in New York City, 1915-1930
- Pamela Smith Hill, Author, Laura Ingalls Wilder: A Writer’s Life
- Dr. John E. Miller, Ph.D., Professor Emeritus of History, South Dakota State University, Brookings, South Dakota, author of Becoming Laura Ingalls Wilder
- Dr. Kim Warren, Ph.D., Associate Professor of History, University of Kansas, Lawrence, Kansas (bonus feature: Native Americans & African Americans)
- Dr. Shawn Alexander, Ph.D., Associate Professor African American Studies, University of Kansas, Lawrence, Kansas (bonus feature: Native Americans & African Americans)
- Karen N. Lasse, Equine Manager, William H. Miner Agricultural Research Institute, Chazy, New York (bonus feature: The Morgan Horse)
- Don Sayward, Sayward's Classic Carriage Service (bonus feature: The Morgan Horse)
- Cheryl Harness, artist and illustrator (bonus feature: Art and Illustration)

== Organizations and locations: research and film production ==
Organizations and locations used for research materials and film production, including (but not exclusive to) re-enactors, archival photos, supplemental film footage, and more, include:

- Berkeley Hall School, Los Angeles, California
- Herbert Hoover Presidential Library and Museum, West Branch, Iowa
- Iowa Educational Services for the Blind and Visually Impaired (formerly the Iowa Braille and Sight Saving School), Vinton, Iowa
- Laura Ingalls Wilder Park and Museum, Burr Oak, Iowa
- Living History Farms, Urbandale, Iowa
- University of Kansas, Lawrence, Kansas
- Plum Creek, Walnut Grove, Minnesota
- Spring Valley Historical Society, Spring Valley, Minnesota
- Ingalls Homestead, De Smet, South Dakota
- Laura Ingalls Wilder Historic Homes, De Smet, South Dakota
- Laura Ingalls Wilder Pageant Society, De Smet, South Dakota
- South Dakota Art Museum, South Dakota State University, Brookings, South Dakota
- Little House Wayside, Pepin, Wisconsin
- Pepin Museum, Pepin, Wisconsin
