= Nellie Oleson =

Fictional character in the Little House series

- Little House on the Prairie character
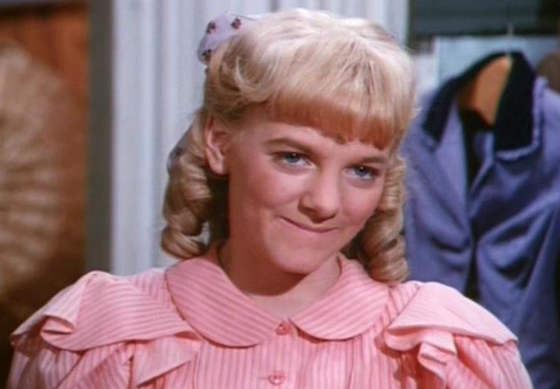
- Alison Arngrim as Nellie Oleson
- First appearance: On the Banks of Plum Creek
- Last appearance: These Happy Golden Years
- Created by: Laura Ingalls Wilder
- Portrayed by: Alison Arngrim

In-universe information
- Family: Harriet and Nels Oleson (parents); Willie Oleson (brother); Nancy Oleson (adopted sister)

Nellie Oleson is a character in the Little House series of autobiographical children's novels written by Laura Ingalls Wilder. She was portrayed by Alison Arngrim in the NBC television show Little House on the Prairie (1974 to 1983), where her role is much expanded. The character is a fictionalized composite of three real girls from Laura Ingalls Wilder’s childhood: Nellie Owens, Genevieve Masters, and Stella Gilbert.

== Character sources ==
=== Nellie Owens ===
Nellie Winfield (Owens) Kirry
- Born: August 2, 1869; Walnut Grove, Minnesota, U.S.
- Died: November 2, 1949 (aged 80); Forest Grove, Oregon, U.S.

Owens was born on August 2, 1869, two years after Laura Ingalls. Nellie's parents, Margaret (1836–1908) and William (1836–1920) Owens did, as Wilder describes, run the local mercantile in Walnut Grove, Minnesota.

Later in her life, around 1883, the Owens family moved to California; probably over the Oregon Trail. In 1891 they went to Tillamook, Oregon, where Nellie taught school and in 1893 married Henry Francis Kirry (1869–1951). They moved to Bay City, Oregon, and had three children: Zola (1894–1986), Lloyd (1896–1961), and Leslie (1900–1931). Soon the Kirrys changed their home again by moving to Rainier, Oregon, in 1899. Her brother Willie went blind from a firecracker explosion, attended a school for the blind, married, and also had three children.

There is no indication that Laura ever saw Nellie Owens again after Laura's family left Walnut Grove in 1879. Nellie died on November 2, 1949, in Oregon and is buried in the Forest View Cemetery in Forest Grove, Oregon.

=== Genevieve Masters ===
Genevieve Maude (Masters) Renwick
- Born: November 12, 1867; Hornby, New York, U.S.
- Died: November 7, 1909 (aged 41); Chicago, Illinois, U.S.

The second girl, Genevieve Masters, was born November 12, 1867, in Hornby, Steuben County, New York and was the spoiled daughter of Laura's former teacher. Genevieve wore beautifully tailored clothes and had striking blonde curly hair, just as "Nellie Oleson" had. Genevieve boasted continually about how much more proper and "civilized" things were in the "East". With her superior attitude, Genevieve was far nastier than Nellie Owens had been, and Laura and Genevieve became keen rivals, both academically and socially.

Gennie's family moved to De Smet not long after the Ingalls family, but the Owens family did not move. Therefore, the "Nellie" of Little Town on the Prairie is most likely Genevieve Masters. In her "Letter to Children" written late in her life (a sort of form letter sent to the hundreds of children who wrote her monthly), Laura stated: "Nellie Oleson . . . moved back East, and did not live many years." Laura was referring to Genevieve Masters in this letter, as Nellie Owens lived to the age of 80. Masters married William Graham V. Renwick (1864-1924) and had one daughter, Margaret (1900-1982).

Genevieve died of pneumonia on November 7, 1909, in Chicago, aged 41 Her remains were brought back to De Smet, South Dakota, and buried in the local cemetery.

=== Stella Gilbert ===
Estella M. (Gilbert) Merrill
- Born: May , 1864; Lake City, Minnesota, U.S.
- Died: September 16, 1944 (aged 80); Yakima, Washington, U.S.

The third girl, Stella Gilbert, born in May 1864, lived on a claim north of the Ingallses in De Smet. She was reportedly very attractive and was very interested in Almanzo Wilder. She was possibly the girl who convinced him to take her on several buggy rides, which were described in These Happy Golden Years. Almanzo, who was not aware of a conflict between Stella (Nellie in the books) and Laura, eventually became aware of Stella's fear of horses (which disgusted him). In addition, Laura eventually gave Almanzo an ultimatum regarding Stella, and Almanzo's invitations to Stella to join them on the rides stopped. This was the last appearance of "Nellie Oleson" in the series.

Stella's older brother was Dave Gilbert, the brave 17-year-old who made the very risky run to Lake Preston, Dakota Territory, on his horse-drawn sled between blizzards to take the outgoing mail and bring back the incoming mail, as described by Laura in The Long Winter.

Stella died in 1944 at the age of 80.

== Fictional Nellie ==
=== Little House books (Biography, non-fiction) ===
Nellie Oleson appeared in three of the Little House novels: On the Banks of Plum Creek (1937), Little Town on the Prairie (1939), and These Happy Golden Years (1943) — the fourth, seventh, and eighth in the series. Laura is 13 to 15 years old in the two intervening novels. On the Banks of Plum Creek alone is set in Minnesota, near Walnut Grove where the long-running television series is set. In that novel Laura is 7 to 9 years old.

Oleson also stars in Nellie Oleson Meets Laura Ingalls, a book by Tui T. Sutherland (as Heather Williams), published by HarperCollins in 2007. The Library of Congress catalog summary is "Wealthy, spoiled Nellie Oleson is only happy when she is the center of attention, and so she feels angry and left out when Laura Ingalls, a poor country girl, moves to Walnut Grove and is embraced by Nellie's friends and schoolteacher." Nellie Oleson Meets Laura Ingalls is one among dozens of Little House series extensions published beginning in the 1990s.

=== Little House on the Prairie television series ===
Nellie Oleson
- Little House on the Prairie character
- Portrayed by: Alison Arngrim
- First appearance: 1.02 Country Girls
- Last appearance: 9.08 The Return of Nellie
In-universe information
- Father: Nels Oleson
- Mother: Harriet Oleson
- Siblings: Willie Oleson; Nancy Oleson (adoptive)
- Husband: Luke Simms (annulled); Percival Dalton
- Children: Benjamin Dalton; Jennifer Dalton
- Aunts: Annabelle Oleson
- First cousins: Kate Thorvald
- Other relatives: Olaf Lundstrom; Peter Lundstrom; Sterling Murdoch

The Little House books were later adapted into a long-running television series. Played by actress Alison Arngrim, Nellie Oleson was a manipulative, witty, sharp-tongued character on the NBC television show, Little House on the Prairie. Her parents, Nels and Harriet Oleson, owned the mercantile in the small town of Walnut Grove, set in post-Civil War Minnesota. Early in the series, the character of Nellie closely resembled her counterpart from the books - mainly as portrayed in On the Banks of Plum Creek. She had long, elaborately curled hair, acted very prissy and spoiled - yet underneath, she could display a vicious and manipulative personality. Nellie took after her doting mother Harriet (Katherine MacGregor), while father Nels (Richard Bull) tended to be more stern with his two children and had little tolerance for Nellie's often cruel antics. Nels and Harriet frequently conflicted on the rearing of both Nellie and Willie (Jonathan Gilbert); Harriet's assertiveness frequently won out, although Nellie was not always allowed to get away with her behavior. For example, in the episode called "The Cheaters", Mrs. Oleson finds out Nellie has cheated. She starts hitting Nellie with her jacket as she chases Nellie out of the schoolyard.

Arngrim's character grew in importance during the series (as did the roles of the entire Oleson family), serving as a perfect antagonist to honest, tomboyish Laura Ingalls, played by Melissa Gilbert. Nellie and Laura feuded during their school years together, which was at times comically paralleled with quarreling between the two girls' mothers, Harriet Oleson and Caroline Ingalls (Karen Grassle).

After Nellie graduated from school, her mother Harriet bestowed her with her own restaurant and hotel. At first Nellie balked, showing great incompetence in the hospitality business. Eventually Nels and Harriet hired Percival Dalton (played by Steve Tracy) to help Nellie learn how to cook and run the restaurant. During this time Nellie began maturing and mellowing — thanks to Percival's work with her and Nels' values partially winning out over Harriet's — and fell in love with Percival. The two eventually married, and Nellie gave birth to twin children (Benjamin and Jennifer).

Nellie becomes friendly with Laura in her adult years and Laura attended her wedding. Before Nellie takes off for her honeymoon, she throws the bouquet to Laura. In the episode "Come Let Us Reason Together", Laura's mother Caroline helped deliver Nellie's twin babies.

Arngrim left the series at the end of the seventh season. Nellie's resulting departure was explained by having her move with Percival and their twins to New York to run the family business when Percival's father falls ill; the move is made permanent when Percival's father dies. After Nellie's departure became permanent, the Olesons adopted a daughter named Nancy (played by Allison Balson), who bore a striking resemblance to Nellie, although she had an even nastier and meaner disposition. Nellie—who retained her pleasant personality seen in her later years—returned in the ninth season and met Nancy, who briefly ran away from home when she (mistakenly) believed that her adoptive parents loved Nellie more than her. When Nellie first meets Nancy and sees how she acts, she asks her parents in shock: "I know I was temperamental at her age, but I wasn't that bad... was I?" They all start to laugh, then they realize she was also rather bad.

Compared to the book On the Banks of Plum Creek, the series presented Nellie Oleson as a much more prominent character. In the books Nellie's family members are very minor characters, whereas the Olesons became major figures on the series, with several episodes focusing on Nellie or her family. Eventually the "villainous duo" of mother Harriet and daughter Nellie proved to be very popular with viewers for their often evil, yet humorous, antics.

=== Other screenings ===
- Although the character Nellie does not appear in any of the Beyond the Prairie: The True Story of Laura Ingalls Wilder movies, Part 1 features a character, Patsy Robbins (played by Jenny Dare Paulin), who is clearly reminiscent of Nellie.
- In the Little House on the Prairie musical, Nellie Oleson was played by Sara Jean Ford and Kate Loprest.

== Cultural impact ==
The sketch comedy group The Nellie Olesons took their name after the character.
