= By the Shores of Silver Lake =

1939 novel by Laura Ingalls Wilder

- Front dust jacket, first edition
- Author: Laura Ingalls Wilder
- Illustrator: Helen Sewell and Mildred Boyle; Garth Williams (1953)
- Series: Little House
- Genre: Children's novel Family saga Western
- Publisher: Harper & Brothers
- Publication date: October 20, 1939
- Publication place: United States
- Media type: Print (hardcover)
- Pages: 260
- OCLC: 6932095
- LC Class: PZ7.W6461
- Preceded by: On the Banks of Plum Creek
- Followed by: The Long Winter

By the Shores of Silver Lake is an autobiographical children's novel written by Laura Ingalls Wilder and published in 1939, the fifth of nine books in her Little House series. It spans just over one year, beginning when she is 12 years old and her family moves from Plum Creek, Minnesota, just north of the small town of Walnut Grove, to what would become De Smet, South Dakota.

The novel was a Newbery Honor book in 1940, as were the fourth through eighth books in the series.

== Story ==
The novel is based on Laura's late childhood spent near De Smet, South Dakota, beginning in 1879. Because her sister, Mary, had gone blind, Pa asks Laura to "be Mary’s eyes" by describing what she sees, and she becomes more patient and mature through this service. The novel also introduces Laura's youngest sister, Grace.

The story begins at Plum Creek, near Walnut Grove, MN, shortly after the Ingalls have recovered from what was, at the time, believed to be scarlet fever which had caused Mary to become blind. Aunt Docia comes to visit, and suggests that Pa work as the bookkeeper in Uncle Henry's railroad camp for fifty dollars a month. Since Mary is too weak to travel, Pa goes ahead with the wagon and team, and the rest of the family follow later by train. The morning Pa is to leave, their beloved old bulldog, Jack, dies in his sleep, saddening Laura greatly. (The dog upon whom he was based was no longer with the Ingalls at that point, but Laura inserted his death here to serve as a transition between her childhood and her adolescence.)

Several months later, Ma and the children travel to Dakota Territory by train. This is their first train trip and they are excited by this mode of transportation, which can cover in a few hours the distance a horse and wagon would travel in a day. Pa comes for them in town, and the next day they leave for the railroad camp. Laura and her cousin, Lena, play together when they are done with their chores, which range from collecting laundry washed by a neighbor to milking cows; Laura rides a horse for the first time when Lena allows her the use of her pony. As winter approaches, the railroad workers demolish the buildings in the camp and return east. As the Ingalls have nowhere to stay post-demolition, they plan to return east too, but the surveyors, who had planned to stay for the winter, are called back east and ask them to stay in their house in exchange for keeping watch over their surveying equipment.

Laura is excited to move into a beautiful house well stocked with provisions. The newly married Mr. and Mrs. Boast arrive in the middle of a snowstorm. They stay past Christmas, and at New Year's the Ingalls visit the Boasts' small home for dinner. To pass time, Mrs. Boast shares her collection of newspapers with Laura and shows the Ingalls how to make a what-not. Later, Reverend Alden unexpectedly visits, and after learning Mary is blind, informs Ma that there is a college for the blind in Iowa. Laura resolves that she will eventually teach school and help send Mary to college.

During a clear night that winter, Laura and Carrie go for a moonlight walk on the lake and encounter a wolf. When Pa goes out the next day to hunt it, he discovers the perfect section of land for their homestead claim. He plans to file on it at the land office in Brookings as soon as the weather improves. However, his departure is delayed by a rush of men moving west who must also stay in the surveyors' building. The money earned from boarding them is later used for Mary's college education. After Pa's return from Brookings, he builds a store building in town so his family can move when the surveyors return. The novel ends as the Ingalls settle into the snug claim shanty on their new land.

== Historical background ==
To encourage settlement of the midwest part of the United States, Congress passed the Homestead Act in 1862. It divided unsettled land into sections, and heads of households could file a claim for very little money. A section is one square mile (2.6 km^{2}; 640 acres), and a claim was ¼ of a section (160 acres). A township is made of 36 sections. A section is identified by three numbers, for example NW quarter of Section 18, Township 109, Range 38. By paying $10.00 plus other filing fees, a man could get 160 acres (0.65 km^{2}) of land for his use if he could live on it for 5 years and not give up to go back east. The Ingalls family had previously staked a claim near Plum Creek, in Minnesota.

Favorable weather conditions, growing demand for the spring wheat suited to the Dakota Territory's climate, and diminished availability of unclaimed land further east combined to a surge in homesteading in the Dakota Territory from 1878–1886, in the so-called Dakota Boom. In the spring of 1880, Charles filed a homestead claim south of De Smet, South Dakota for the NE quarter of Section 3, Township 110, Range 56.

A few details in the novel differ from accounts in more autobiographical sources. For example, it seems that Laura never actually visited the railroad grade, but in the novel she went to the grade with her father. She also wrote that the surveyors left food in the house when they moved in and let the Ingalls have it. However, other sources are contradictory and it is unclear whether Pa had to buy the supplies for winter.

Rose Wilder Lane, Laura's daughter, suggested to Laura not to incorporate Mary's blindness into the books. Laura however decided to write it in, considering that the whole situation was life-altering for the entire family and not just Mary; for instance, one of the reasons Laura became a teacher was to help with financing to send Mary to the Iowa Braille and Sight Saving School.

== Reception ==
Virginia Kirkus had handled Ingalls Wilder's debut novel Little House in the Big Woods for Harper & Brothers as its book editor from 1926 to 1932. In Kirkus Reviews, her semimonthly bulletin from 1933, she awarded this novel a starred review (as she did its two predecessors and one successor, books 3 to 6 and no others). She assessed it frankly as the bookshop's advisor: "One always hesitates as to whether these stories of Laura Wilder's childhood belong with fiction or non-fiction, so place this where you have found the others sell best. ...A splendidly written contribution to factual frontier material, of special interest to the Middle Western market."

The novel was the second of five Newbery Honor books for Wilder, books 4 to 8 in the series.

== Modern influence ==
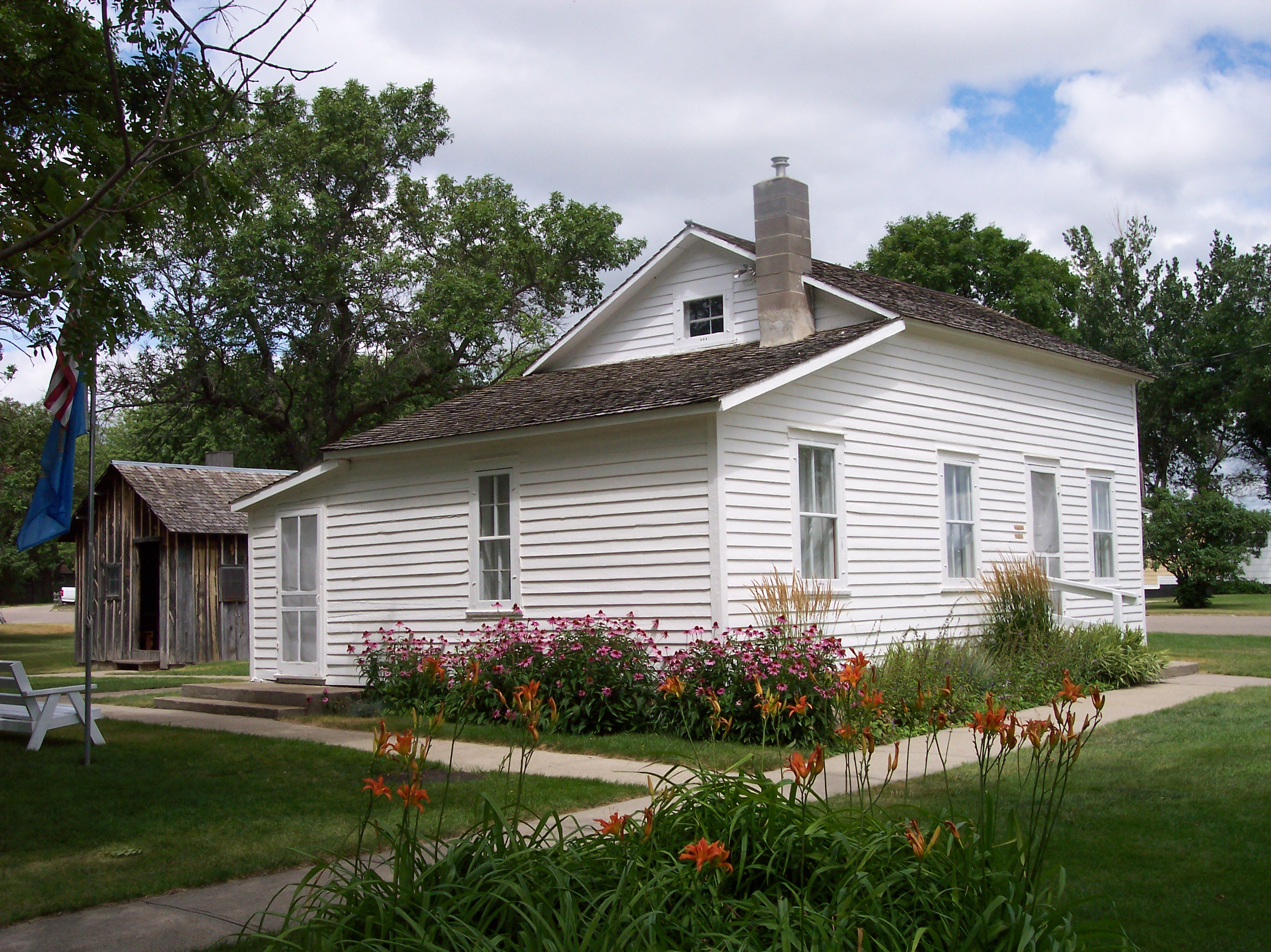
The Surveyors' House is a Laura Ingalls Wilder historic site in De Smet, South Dakota

Today, De Smet, South Dakota, attracts many fans with its historic sites from the novels By the Shores of Silver Lake, The Long Winter, Little Town on the Prairie, These Happy Golden Years, and The First Four Years. From 1879 to 1894 the Ingalls lived there. Their homestead, a house in town built by Pa, the Brewster School where Laura taught, and the surveyors' house they lived in between 1879 and 1880 are open to visitors.

In addition to the Little House books, four series of books expand them to include five generations of Wilder's family. Their success has produced many related books including two series ("Little House Chapter Books" and "My First Little House Books") that present the original stories in condensed and simplified form for younger readers. Additional series have been written by other authors to tell the stories of Wilder's mother (“The Caroline Years ”), grandmother ("The Charlotte Years"), great-grandmother (“The Martha Years”), and daughter (“The Rose Years”). There are also Little House-themed craft, music, and cookbooks.

== Bibliography ==
- Anderson, William. A Little House Reader. New York: Harper Collins publishers. 1998. ISBN 0-06-026394-6.
- Anderson, William. Laura’s Album: a remembrance scrapbook of Laura Ingalls Wilder. New York: HarperCollins Publishers. 1998. ISBN 0-06-027842-0.
- Anderson, William. Laura Ingalls Wilder: The Iowa Story. Burr Oak, Iowa. The Laura IngallsWilder Park and Museum. 2001. ISBN 0-9610088-9-X
- Anderson, William. Prairie Girl: The Life of Laura Ingalls Wilder. New York: HarperCollins Publishers. 2004. ISBN 0-06-028974-0
- Anderson, William. The Little House Guidebook. New York: HarperCollins Publishers. 1996. ISBN 0-06-446177-7
- Garson, Eugenia and Haufrecht, Herbert. The Laura Ingalls Wilder Songbook: Favorite Songs from the Little House Books. New York: HarperCollins Children's Books. 1996. ISBN 0-06-027036-5
- Gormley, Beatrice. Laura Ingalls Wilder: Young Pioneer. New York: Aladdin Paperbacks. 2001. ISBN 0-689-83924-3
- Miller, John E. Becoming Laura Ingalls Wilder: The Woman Behind the Legend. University of Missouri Press. Columbia, Missouri. 1998. ISBN 0-8262-1167-4
- Wade, Mary Dodson. Homesteading on the Plains. Millbrook Press. Brookfield, Connecticut. 1997. ISBN 0-7613-0218-2.
- Wallner, Alexandera. Laura Ingalls Wilder. New York: Holiday House inc. 1997. ISBN 0-8234-1314-4.
- Ward, S. Meet Laura Ingalls Wilder. New York: Rosen Publishing Group. 2001. ISBN 0-8239-5712-8
- Wilder, Laura Ingalls. Dear Laura: Letters From Children To Laura Ingalls Wilder. New York: HarperCollins Publishers. 1996. ISBN 0-06-026274-5
- Wilder, Laura Ingalls. Little House in the Big Woods. New York: HarperCollins Publishers. 1953. ISBN 0-06-026430-6
- Wilder, Laura Ingalls. A Little House Traveler: Writings from Laura Ingalls Wilder’s Journey Across America. New York: HarperCollins Publishers. 2006. ISBN 0-06-072491-9
- Wilder, Laura Ingalls. On the Shores of Silver Lake. New York: HarperCollins Publishers. 1967. ISBN 0-06-026416-0.
