= A Little House Traveler =

Autobiographical collection by Laura Ingalls Wilder

- Author: Laura Ingalls Wilder
- Series: Little House
- Genre: Travel, diary, correspondence
- Publisher: HarperCollins
- Publication date: 2006
- Publication place: United States
- Media type: Print (hardcover)
- Pages: 344 pp.
- ISBN: 9780060724917
- LC Class: S3545.I342 Z42 2006
- Preceded by: West from Home

A Little House Traveler: Writings from Laura Ingalls Wilder's Journeys Across America is a collection of early writings by Laura Ingalls Wilder, the author of the Little House series of children's novels. It consists of three parts: On the Way Home, a diary originally published in 1962; West from Home, a collection of letters from Wilder to her husband Almanzo Wilder written in 1915 and published in 1974; and The Road Back, a previously unpublished diary.

The Road Back is Laura Ingalls Wilder's journal written during an automobile trip from Mansfield, Missouri to DeSmet, South Dakota and the Black Hills, with her husband Almanzo in 1931, to visit the family and collect materials for the autobiographical Little House books.

== Reception ==
Reviewing the collection for The Christian Science Monitor, Jenny Sawyer observed of the previously unpublished diary, "The Road Back, a set of diary entries chronicling Laura and husband Almanzo's return to the place they fell in love, superimposes the 40-years-removed Laura on the setting of her young adulthood. With plenty of names and references that allude to her Little House years, Part 3 of this book is almost like getting Laura Ingalls, protagonist, back. This concluding section is a literal and figurative return home for both author and reader." (Sawyer highlighted the previously published correspondence, West from Home.)
