= The First Four Years =

The First Four Years may refer to:

- The First Four Years (album), a 1983 compilation album by Black Flag
- The First Four Years (novel), an autobiographical novel by Laura Ingalls Wilder
