= Katherine Cannon =

American actress

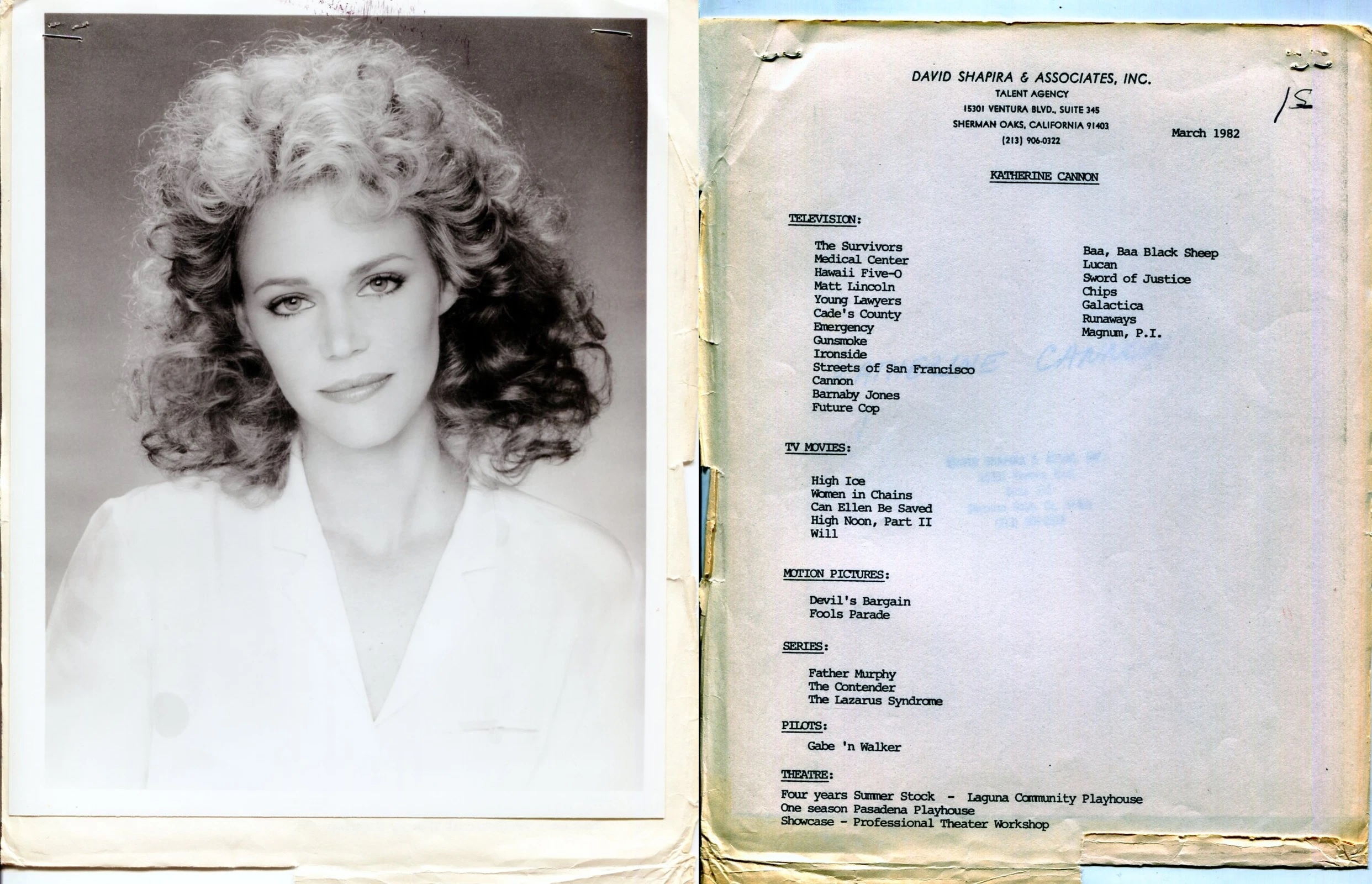
- Born: September 6, 1953 (age 72); Hartford, Connecticut, U.S.
- Other name: Kathy Cannon
- Occupation: Actress
- Years active: 1969–2015
- Spouses: Richard Chambers (m. 1974; div. 1980) Dean Butler (m. 2001)
- Children: 1

Katherine Cannon (born September 6, 1953, in Hartford, Connecticut) is an American actress.

== Career ==
Cannon's early roles included Hawaii Five-O (episode: "Time and Memories", 10/7/1970), Fools' Parade (1971), Private Duty Nurses (1971), Women in Chains (1972) Emergency! (1973) and Baa Baa Black Sheep. She appeared in two Barnaby Jones episodes, titled "Dangerous Summer" (02/11/1975) and "Killer on Campus" (03/24/77), respectively. She appeared in a recurring role on CHiPs (1978, 1979, and 1981) as female trucker Robbie Davis.

She first attracted notice in High Noon, Part II: The Return of Will Kane (1980) playing Amy Kane. She later played schoolteacher Mae Woodward in the TV series, Father Murphy, and appeared in the sci-fi thriller The Hidden in 1987. She is currently best known for playing Felice Martin, the cheating and domineering mother of Donna Martin (Tori Spelling), on the long-running teen series, Beverly Hills, 90210.

== Personal life ==
Cannon was born on September 6, 1953, in Hartford, Connecticut. The daughter of a ballroom dancer, Cannon was raised in Laguna Beach, California. She was introduced to acting by Judy Farrell, wife of actor Mike Farrell.

In 1974, Cannon married commercial director Richard Chambers. The couple had one son, Colin Thomas Chambers, before divorcing in 1980. In 2001, she remarried, to actor Dean Butler who played Almanzo Wilder for several seasons on Little House on the Prairie. They met when Cannon auditioned for the female lead in the Michael Landon series Father Murphy.

== Filmography ==
=== Film ===
Year	Title	Role	Notes
1971	Private Duty Nurses	Spring	
1971	Fools' Parade	Chanty	
1974	Real Pleasure	Ericca	
1984	The Red Fury	Amelia	
1987	The Hidden	Barbara Becker	
1993	The Hidden II	Barbara Beck	Archive footage
2002	Shattered Lies	Betty Holt	
2003	Down the Barrel	Darla	
2015	Little House on the Prairie: The Legacy of Laura Ingalls Wilder	Laura Ingalls Wilder	voice role

=== Television ===
Year	Title	Role	Notes
1969	The Survivors	Shelia Riley	2 episodes
1970	Medical Center	Nancy	Episode: "The V.D. Story"
1970, 1978	Hawaii Five-O	Melissa Cole / Joan Wallis	2 episodes
1971	The Young Lawyers	Penny Graham	Episode: "And the Walls Came Tumbling Down"
1971	Monty Nash	Gail Reynolds	Episode: "The Ambassador's Daughter"
1971	Bearcats!	Amy Latimer	Episode: "Bitter Flats"
1971	Cade's County	Christy Griswold	Episode: "The Allen Land"
1972	Women in Chains	Alice	Television film
1972	Assignment Vienna	Cindy	Episode: "Hot Potato"
1973	Emergency!	Mrs. Barton	Episode: "Audit"
1973	Gunsmoke	Susan	Episode: "Susan Was Evil"
1973, 1975	Ironside	Isabel Fredericks / Vicki Dunhill	2 episodes
1974	Can Ellen Be Saved	Ellen Lindsey	ABC Movie of the Week
1974	Cannon	Cheryl Blythe	Episode: "The Deadly Trail"
1974	The Streets of San Francisco	Mary-Beth Hall	Episode: "Flags of Terror"
1975–1977	Barnaby Jones	Various roles	3 episodes
1977	Most Wanted	Eileen Carson	Episode: "The White Collar Killer"
1977	Future Cop	Helen	Episode: "Girl on the Ledge"
1977	Lucan	Penny	Episode: "The Search"
1977–1978	Black Sheep Squadron	Dottie Dixon	7 episodes
1978	Battlestar Galactica	Vella	Episode: "The Lost Warrior"
1978	Sword of Justice	Alice	Episode: "Judgement Day"
1978–1981	CHiPs	Robbie Davis / Mary Kate	4 episodes
1979	B. J. and the Bear	Joanne	Episode: "The Murphy Contingent"
1979	The Runaways	Patricia	Episode: "Throwaway Child"
1979	The Incredible Hulk	Jackie Swan	Episode: "Metamorphosis"
1980	High Ice	Sandy	Television film
1980	B.A.D. Cats	Donna	Episode: "Life and Death of a Beauty Queen"
1980	The Contender	Jill Sindon	5 episodes
1980	High Noon, Part II: The Return of Will Kane	Amy Kane	Television film
1980, 1983	Magnum, P.I.	Marsha Mackenzie / Linda Booton	2 episodes
1981	Gabe and Walker	Cassie	Television film
1981–1983	Father Murphy	Mae Woodward/Murphy	34 episodes
1982	Will: G. Gordon Liddy	Fran Liddy	Television film
1984	Hotel	Dana Peterson	Episode: "Memories"
1984	The Red-Light Sting	Diane Marks	Television film
1984	Mickey Spillane's Mike Hammer	Linda Shelton	Episode: "Dead Card Down"
1984	Matt Houston	DiDi Adams	Episode: "Deadly Games"
1985	Riptide	Sally Jennings	Episode: "The Twisted Cross"
1985	Airwolf	Megan Ravenson	Episode: "Fortune Teller"
1986, 1990	Hunter	Karen Brandt / Gail Morton	2 episodes
1986–1991	Matlock	Various roles	5 episodes
1986–1995	Murder, She Wrote	Various roles	5 episodes
1988	HeartBeat	Priscilla Gorshalk	3 episodes
1989	Hard Time on Planet Earth	Mrs. Hogan	Episode: "Wally's Game"
1989, 1992	Empty Nest	Laura / Dr. Kenney	2 episodes
1990	Hardball	Monica Whitmore	Episode: "A Killer Date"
1990	Columbo	June Clark	Episode: "Columbo Goes to College"
1990	Matters of the Heart	Hope Harper	Television film
1991	Jake and the Fatman	Vicki Blane	Episode: "You Don't Know Me"
1991	Dallas	Beth Krebbs	Episode: "Conundrum"
1991	In the Heat of the Night	Faye Darnelle	Episodes: "An Eye for an Eye"
1992	Doogie Howser, M.D.	Dr. Julie Ross	Episode: "That's What Friends Are For"
1992–2000	Beverly Hills, 90210	Felice Martin	40 episodes
1992	Blossom	Doris	Episode: "Kids"
1997	High Tide	Vivianne	Episode: "Two Barretts and a Baby"
1997	Mike Hammer, Private Eye	Mrs. Phillips	Episode: "Beat Street"
1998	JAG	Evelyn Clancy	Episode: "With Intent to Die"
1998	Seven Days	Grandma	2 episodes
2004	She Spies	Galina West	Episode: "Wedding of the Century"
