= Little Town on the Prairie =

1941 novel by Laura Ingalls Wilder

- Front dust jacket with Sewell's illustration
- Author: Laura Ingalls Wilder
- Illustrator: Helen Sewell and Mildred Boyle; Garth Williams (1953)
- Series: Little House
- Genre: Children's novel Family saga Western
- Publisher: Harper & Brothers
- Publication date: November 20, 1941
- Publication place: United States
- Media type: Print (hardcover)
- Pages: 288; 290 pp.
- OCLC: 6389205
- LC Class: PZ7.W6461 Liv
- Preceded by: The Long Winter
- Followed by: These Happy Golden Years

Little Town on the Prairie is an autobiographical children's novel written by Laura Ingalls Wilder and published in 1941, the seventh of nine books in her Little House series. It is set in De Smet, South Dakota. It opens in the spring after the Long Winter and ends as Laura becomes a school teacher so she can help her sister Mary stay at a school for the blind in Vinton, Iowa. It tells the story of 15-year-old Laura's first paid job outside of home and her last term of schooling. At the end of the novel, she receives a teacher's certificate and is employed to teach at the Brewster settlement, 12 miles (19 km) away.

The novel was a Newbery Honor book in 1942, as the fourth to eighth Little House books all were from 1938 to 1944.

== Plot summary ==
The novel opens in May 1881, after Hard Winter. At the Ingalls' claim, Pa begins planting the corn and oats that will serve as cash crops for the family, after which he builds the second half of the claim shanty, creating two small bedrooms. Meanwhile, Ma begins planting her new vegetable garden and Mary, Laura, and Carrie happily help with the farm chores and housework and care for their youngest sister, Grace. After gophers begin eating Pa's seed corn and a mouse cuts his hair in his sleep, the family decides to get a cat, which quickly proves to be a skilled hunter despite being taken from its mother at only five weeks old.

One day at supper, Pa asks Laura whether she will accept a job in town helping to sew shirts; the surge in people newly arriving in town means a need for services such as this. She hates the work but continues because the money will help send her sister, Mary, to a college for the blind in Iowa. Some of the men in town organize horse races, and Laura's future husband, Almanzo Wilder, wins the buggy race with his two Morgan horses hitched to his brother's heavy peddler's wagon.

On the homestead, the Ingalls' crops of corn and oats are doing well, and Pa plans to sell them to pay for Mary to begin college that fall, but blackbirds descend and destroy both crops. Laura and Mary resign themselves to the fact that Mary will have to delay college, but Pa sells one of their cows to make up the amount. When Ma and Pa escort her there, Laura, Carrie, and Grace are left alone for a week. In order to stave off the loneliness stemming from Mary's departure, they do the fall cleaning; they succeed despite a few mishaps, surprising Ma and Pa when they return.

In the fall, the Ingalls move to town; they believe the coming winter will not be as hard as the previous one, but as the claim shanty is not weatherproofed, Pa thinks it is best not to risk staying in it. In town, Laura and Carrie attend school again, and Laura is reunited with her friends, Minnie Johnson and Mary Power. She also meets a new girl, Ida Brown, the adopted daughter of the town's new minister, Reverend Brown, who claims to be related to John Brown of Kansas. Nellie Oleson, her nemesis from Plum Creek, has moved to De Smet and is also attending the school. The teacher for the fall term is Eliza Jane Wilder, Almanzo's older sister, who has her own claim nearby. Nellie turns her against Laura, and Miss Wilder loses control of the school for a time. A visit by the school board restores order; however, she leaves at the end of the fall term.

For the winter term, Miss Wilder is replaced by Mr. Clewett. Laura sets herself to studying, as she only has one year left before she can apply for a teaching certificate, but relaxes when the town of De Smet begins having literary meetings at the school, where the whole town gathers for fun every Friday night: singing, elocution, a spelling bee, or plays and minstrel shows put on by the townspeople.

The winter is very mild, so Laura and Carrie never miss a day of school. Laura and her classmates become friendly after a birthday party for Ben Woodworth, so she begins lagging in her studies, though she remains head of the class. She spends the summer studying to make up for lost time. The next school year, there will be another new teacher, Mr. Owen. During a week of church revival meetings, Almanzo asks to escort Laura home from church. Ma is surprised at this because she is only 15 and he is a grown man.

Near Christmas, Mr. Owen organizes a school exhibition to raise awareness of the school's needs, as the school is becoming overcrowded. He assigns Laura and Ida the duty of reciting the whole of American history up to that point. Despite their nervousness, on the night of the school exhibition they perform perfectly, as does Carrie, who recites a poem. Almanzo once again sees Laura home, and offers to take her on a sleigh ride after he completes the cutter he is building.

At home, Laura is met by Mr. Boast and Mr. Brewster, who saw her perform at the exhibition and want her to take a teaching position at Brewster's settlement, twelve miles (19 km) from town. The school superintendent comes and tests her; although she is not yet 16, he grants her a third-grade teaching certificate. The novel ends with her preparing to teach school.

== Historical context ==
Though Wilder began writing the books as autobiographical recollections, they are considered historical fiction and have won a number of literary awards. In 1941, this novel was awarded a Newbery Honor for exceptional children's literature.

To encourage settlement of the mid-west part of the United States, Congress passed the Homestead Act in 1862. It divided unsettled land into sections, and heads of households could file a claim for very little money. A section is 1-square-mile (2.6 km^{2}), and a claim was ¼ of a section. A township is made of 36 sections. A section is identified by three numbers, for example NW quarter of Section 18, Township 109, Range 38. By paying $10.00 plus other filing fees, a man could get 160 acres (0.65 km^{2}) of land for his use if he could live on it for 5 years and not give up to go back east. The Ingalls staked one claim near Plum Creek. In spring 1880, Charles filed a homestead claim south of De Smet for the NE quarter of Section 3, Township 110, Range 56.

The novel takes place between the summer of 1881 and December 24, 1882. Mary enrolled in the Iowa School for the Blind in Vinton on November 23, 1881. Although the Dakota territorial government paid the tuition for blind persons to attend the college, if the person was a Dakota resident, Wilder's income was still necessary to help the family financially with Mary's absence.

In the context of Wilder's books, the "Nellie Oleson" here is the one from On the Banks of Plum Creek, although her character was a conflation of three girls Wilder knew: Nellie Owens in Plum Creek, Genevieve Masters in De Smet and Stella Gilbert in De Smet. In reality, she never saw the "Nellie" from Plum Creek again after her family left the town.

== Subsequent events ==
Although the novel ends with Wilder's start as a schoolteacher, her life and that of her family continued. At age 18 she married Almanzo Wilder. Together they homesteaded and raised horses, which he loved. They had a daughter, Rose Wilder Lane, and lost a son in infancy. Lane grew up to become an author, among other things. Wilder wrote over the years in the form of essays and articles for newspapers and magazines, mostly articles related to homesteading. She wrote out the manuscript for each of her books by hand, and Lane helped her type and edit them. The well-known illustrations by Garth Williams appeared in the revised editions about 20 years later.

== Reception ==
Virginia Kirkus had handled Wilder's debut novel Little House in the Big Woods for Harper and Brothers as its book editor from 1926 to 1932. In Kirkus Reviews, her semimonthly bulletin from 1933, she had awarded the 3rd to 6th novels starred reviews. There would be no more. Of this novel she advised, "These books are written in the third person, as if they were fiction, but actually each successive volume provides another panel in Wilder's autobiography. This one is for distinctly older girls than its predecessor, as Wilder secures her first post as school teacher, and puts her own school days behind her. ... For some reason, the almost-a-young lady Wilder isn't quite as real as the child of the wilderness."

The novel was the fourth of five Newbery Honor books for Wilder, books 4 to 8 in the series.

== Modern influence ==
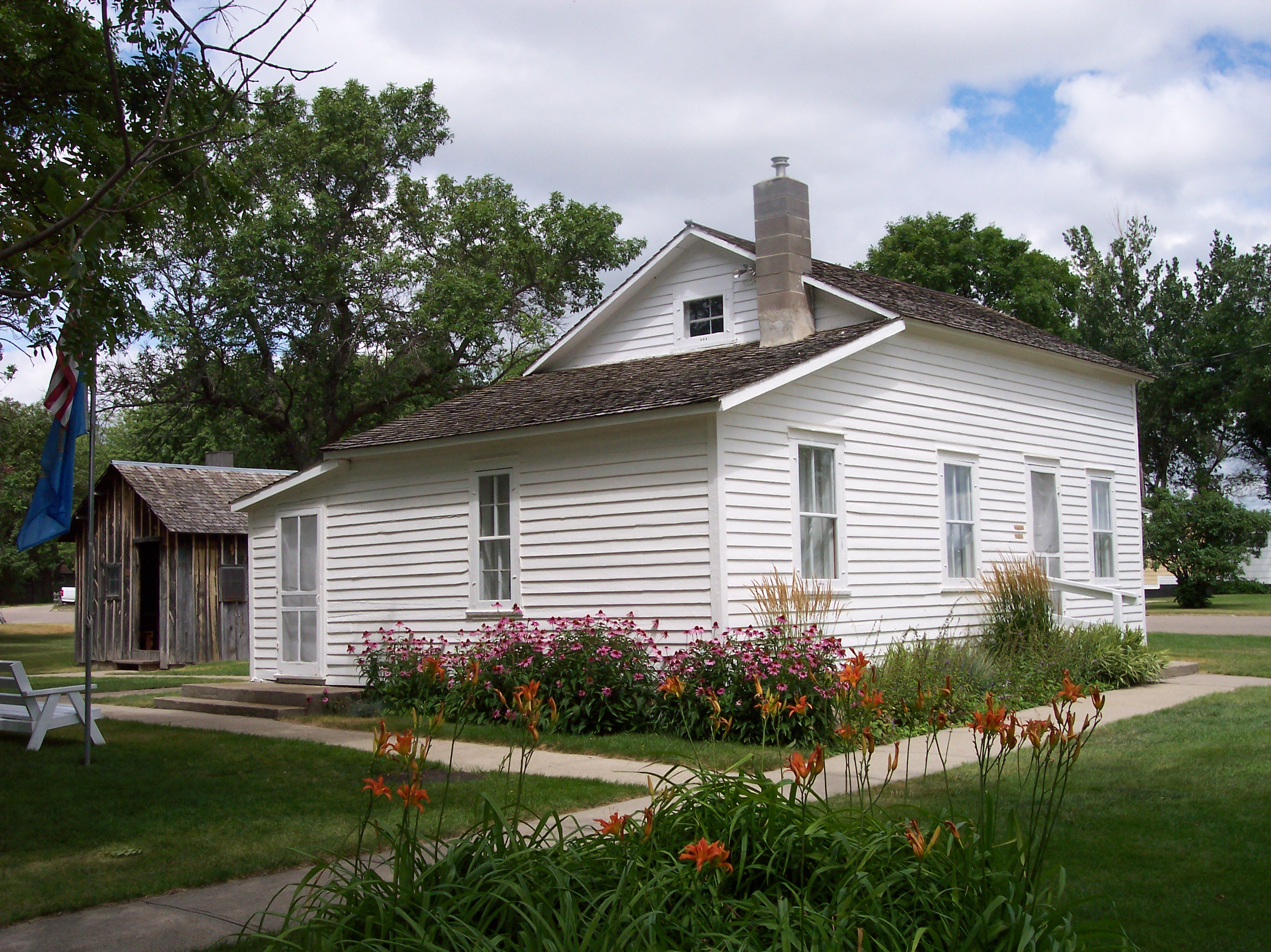
The Surveyors House is a Laura Ingalls Wilder historic site in De Smet, South Dakota

Today, De Smet, South Dakota attracts many fans with its historic sites from the books By the Shores of Silver Lake, The Long Winter, Little Town on the Prairie, These Happy Golden Years, and The First Four Years. From 1879 to 1894 the Ingalls lived in De Smet and the family homestead, a house in town built by Charles, the Brewster School where Wilder taught, and the surveyor's home the Ingalls lived in between 1879 and 1880 are open to visitors.

In addition to the Little House series, four series of books expand the Little House series to include five generations of Wilder's family. The success of the Little House series has produced many related books including two series (Little House Chapter Books and My First Little House Books) that present the original stories in condensed and simplified form for younger readers. Additional series have been written to tell the stories of Wilder's mother, The Caroline Years, her grandmother, The Charlotte Years, " and her daughter, The Rose Years. There are also Little House themed craft, music, and cookbooks.

== Bibliography ==
- Anderson, William. A Little House Reader. New York: HarperCollins publishers. 1998. ISBN 0-06-026394-6.
- Anderson, William. Laura’s Album: a remembrance scrapbook of Laura Ingalls Wilder. New York: HarperCollins Publishers. 1998. ISBN 0-06-027842-0.
- Anderson, William. Laura Ingalls Wilder: The Iowa Story. Burr Oak, Iowa. The Laura IngallsWilder Park and Museum. 2001. ISBN 0-9610088-9-X
- Anderson, William. Prairie Girl: The Life of Laura Ingalls Wilder. New York: HarperCollins Publishers. 2004. ISBN 0-06-028974-0
- Anderson, William. The Little House Guidebook. New York: HarperCollins Publishers. 1996. ISBN 0-06-446177-7
- Garson, Eugenia and Haufrecht, Herbert. The Laura Ingalls Wilder Songbook: Favorite Songs from the Little House Books. New York: HarperCollins Children's Books. 1996. ISBN 0-06-027036-5
- Gormley, Beatrice. Laura Ingalls Wilder: Young Pioneer. New York: Aladdin Paperbacks. 2001. ISBN 0-689-83924-3
- Miller, John E. Becoming Laura Ingalls Wilder: The Woman Behind the Legend. University of Missouri Press. Columbia, Missouri. 1998. ISBN 0-8262-1167-4
- Wade, Mary Dodson. Homesteading on the Plains. Millbrook Press. Brookfield, Connecticut. 1997. ISBN 0-7613-0218-2.
- Wallner, Alexandera. Laura Ingalls Wilder. New York: Holiday House inc. 1997. ISBN 0-8234-1314-4.
- Ward, S. Meet Laura Ingalls Wilder. New York: Rosen Publishing Group. 2001. ISBN 0-8239-5712-8
- Wilder, Laura Ingalls. Dear Laura: Letters From Children To Laura Ingalls Wilder. New York: HarperCollins Publishers. 1996. ISBN 0-06-026274-5
- Wilder, Laura Ingalls. Little House in the Big Woods. New York: HarperCollins Publishers. 1953. ISBN 0-06-026430-6
- Wilder, Laura Ingalls. A Little House Traveler: Writings from Laura Ingalls Wilder’s Journey Across America. New York: HarperCollins Publishers. 2006. ISBN 0-06-072491-9
- Wilder, Laura Ingalls. Little Town on the Prairie. New York: HarperCollins Publishers. 1969. ISBN 0-06-026451-9
