= The Nellie Olesons =

American performing artists

The Nellie Olesons is a sketch comedy group based in Los Angeles. The group's name comes from Laura Ingalls' rival Nellie Oleson on the television series Little House on the Prairie. The group began in New York City and has toured the United States and Canada. The group's short film The Nellie Olesons won the Audience Award for Best Short Video at Outfest in 1997. In 2005, the Nellie Olesons spent 2005 performing Older! Uglier! Meaner! at a variety of venues.
