= Wendy McClure =

American writer and editor

Wendy McClure (born 1971) is an American writer and editor.

She is the author of the memoir I'm Not The New Me as well as The Amazing Mackerel Pudding Plan, a humorous look at 1974 Weight Watchers diet recipes. Her third book The Wilder Life: My Adventures in the Lost World of ‘Little House on the Prairie’, chronicling her interest in the life and novels of Laura Ingalls Wilder and her travels to their settings, was published in 2011.

McClure has been published in a number of anthologies including Love is a Four-Letter Word and Sleepaway: Writings on Summer Camp and was a regular contributor to The New York Times Magazine's "True Life Tales." She is the pop culture columnist for Bust magazine and a senior editor at Sourcebooks.

== Books by Wendy McClure ==
- A Garden to Save the Birds (2021)
- It’s a Pumpkin! (2020)
- Wanderville (2014)
- The Wilder Life: My Adventures in the Lost World of Little House on the Prairie (2012)
- Don’t Trade the Baby for a Horse: And Other Ways to Make Your Life a Little More Laura Ingalls Wilder (2012)
- The Princess and the Peanut Allergy (2009)
- I’m Not the New Me (2005)
