= Helen Sewell =

American illustrator and writer

- Born: 27 June 1896; Mare Island, California
- Died: 24 February 1957 (aged 60); New York, New York
- Education: Pratt Institute, Packer Collegiate Institute

Helen Moore Sewell (June 27, 1896 – February 24, 1957) was an American illustrator and writer of children's books. She won a Caldecott Medal Honor as illustrator of The Thanksgiving Story by Alice Dalgliesh and she illustrated several novels that were runners-up for the Newbery Medal. Some of her papers were donated to the University of Minnesota, and other papers are at Cornell University.

== Early life ==
Sewell was born in Mare Island, California, the daughter of Minnie Moore, a watercolor artist, and William Elbridge Sewell, a Navy commander who later became Governor of Guam. She had two younger sisters.

Her mother died in 1901, before the family moved to Guam. Because of her father's naval career she had also lived in England, France and Sweden. Her father died before her eighth birthday, and Sewell and her sisters moved to Brooklyn to live with an aunt and uncle. At age twelve she became the youngest person to attend the Pratt Institute. She also studied under Alexander Archipenko, who influenced her drawing style. She graduated from Packer Collegiate Institute.

== Art career ==
Sewell began earning money by illustrating greeting cards. The first book she illustrated was The Cruise of the Little Dipper and Other Fairy Tales, written by Susanne Langer. In 1932 Sewell was the first illustrator of the Little House series by Laura Ingalls Wilder. For the Limited Edition Club Sewell illustrated the poems of Emily Dickinson, plus Jane Austen's Pride and Prejudice and Sense and Sensibility.

Most of the characters in Sewell's art work were drawn from her imagination, and she rarely used artist models. When illustrating the Little House series she consulted photographs of the Wilder family.

Starting with the 1947 book Three Tall Tales Sewell began using a comic book style to add fun to amusing stories, for children had told her that her animals were too true to life for humorous books.

== Death ==
She died on February 24, 1957, in New York City, after a long illness.

== Works illustrated ==
- 1923 The Cruise of the Little Dipper and Other Fairy Tales, Susanne Langer
- 1928 Menagerie, Poems for Children, Mary Britton Miller
- 1929 Mr. Hermit Crab, Mimpsy Rhys
- 1932 Little House in the Big Woods, Laura Ingalls Wilder
- 1932 The Dream Keeper, Langston Hughes
- 1933 Farmer Boy, Laura Ingalls Wilder
- 1934 A First Bible, Jean West Maury
- 1934 Away Goes Sally, Elizabeth Coatsworth
- 1934 Bluebonnets for Lucinda, Frances Clarke Sayers
- 1934 Cinderella
- 1935 Anne Frances, Eliza Orne White
- 1935 Little House on the Prairie, Laura Ingalls Wilder
- 1935 Mrs. Hermit Crab, Mimpsy Rhys
- 1935 Peter and Gretchen of Old Nuremberg, Viola M. Jones
- 1935 A Round of Carols, T. Tertius Noble
- 1936 Ten Saints, Eleanor Farjeon
- 1937 Baby Island, Carol Ryrie Brink
- 1937 Old John, Máirín Cregan
- 1937 On the Banks of Plum Creek, Laura Ingalls Wilder (co-illustrated with Mildred Boyle)
- 1937 The Magic Hill, A. A. Milne
- 1937 The Princess and the Apple Tree, A. A. Milne
- 1938 The Young Brontës, Mary Louise Jarden
- 1939 Five Bushel Farm, Elizabeth Coatsworth
- 1939 By the Shores of Silver Lake, Laura Ingalls Wilder (co-illus. Boyle)
- 1940 The Fair American, Elizabeth Coatsworth
- 1939 The Long Winter, Laura Ingalls Wilder (co-illus. Boyle)
- 1940 (edition) Pride and Prejudice, Jane Austen
- 1941 (edition) The Dream Keeper and Other Poems, Langston Hughes
- 1941 Little Town on the Prairie, Laura Ingalls Wilder (co-illus. Boyle)
- 1941 Tag-Along Tooloo, Frances Clarke Sayers
- 1942 The Blue-Eyed Lady, Ferenc Molnar
- 1943 These Happy Golden Years, Laura Ingalls Wilder (co-illus. Boyle) – last of the original Little House books
- 1944 A Bee in Her Bonnet, Eva Kristofferson
- 1944 The Big Green Umbrella, Elizabeth Coatsworth
- 1944 Boat Children of Canton, Marion B. Ward
- 1944 Christmas Magic, James S Tippett
- 1946 The Brave Bantam, Louise Seaman
- 1946 Once There Was a Little Boy, Dorothy Kunhardt
- 1946 The Wonderful Day, Elizabeth Coatsworth
- 1947 Three Tall Tales, Helen Sewell and Eleska
- 1948 All Around the Town, Phyllis McGinley
- 1948 Azor, Maude Crowley
- 1949 Azor and the Haddock, Maude Crowley
- 1951 Azor and the Blue-Eyed Cow, Maude Crowley
- 1951 Secrets and Surprises, Irmegarde Ebertle
- 1952 The Bears on Hemlock Mountain, Alice Dalgliesh
- 1952 The Colonel's Squad, Alf Evers
- 1952 Mrs. McThing, Mary Ellen Chase (co-illus. Madeleine Gekiere)
- 1952 (edition) Poems, Emily Dickinson
- 1952 The White Horse, Elizabeth Coatsworth
- 1953 Ten Saints, Eleanor Farjeon
- 1954 The Thanksgiving Story, Alice Dalgliesh
- 1955 The Three Kings of Saba, Alf Evers
- 1957 (edition) Sense and Sensibility, Jane Austen

=== Books she wrote and illustrated ===
- 1931 A Head for Happy, Helen Sewell
- 1932 Words to the Wise, Helen Sewell
- 1933 Blue Barns, Helen Sewell
- 1936 Ming and Mehitable, Helen Sewell
- 1936 Peggy and the Pony, Helen Sewell
- 1940 Jimmy and Jemima, Helen Sewell
- 1941 Peggy and the Pup, Helen Sewell
- 1944 Belinda the Mouse, Helen Sewell
- 1944 Birthdays for Robin, Helen Sewell
