= Edmund Ingalls =

Edmund Ingalls (1586–1648) was the founder of Lynn, Massachusetts.

Born to Robert Ingalls June 26, 1586, in Skirbeck, Lincolnshire, England, he arrived in Salem, Massachusetts, in Governor John Endicott's company in 1628. In 1629, he settled Lynn, Massachusetts, with his brother Francis and four others. In March 1648, as he was travelling to Boston on horseback, a bridge that he was riding over collapsed, and he was subsequently drowned in the Saugus River.

Notable descendants include pioneer Charles Ingalls, and his daughter Laura Ingalls Wilder, author of Little House on the Prairie.
