= Little House on the Prairie (novel) =

1935 American children's novel by Laura Ingalls Wilder

- Front dust jacket with Sewell's illustration
- Author: Laura Ingalls Wilder
- Illustrator: Helen Sewell; Garth Williams (1953)
- Series: Little House
- Genre: Children's novel Family saga Western
- Set in: Montgomery County, Kansas, 1869–70
- Publisher: Harper & Brothers
- Publication date: September 19, 1935
- Publication place: United States
- Media type: Print (hardcover)
- Pages: 200; 334 pp.
- OCLC: 18319291
- LC Class: PZ7.W6461 Lit 1971
- Preceded by: Farmer Boy
- Followed by: On the Banks of Plum Creek

Little House on the Prairie is an autobiographical children's novel by Laura Ingalls Wilder, published in 1935. It was the third novel published in the Little House series, continuing the story of the first, Little House in the Big Woods (1932), but not related to the second, Farmer Boy. Thus, it is sometimes called the second one in the series, or the second volume of "the Laura Years". (Note: One 5-volume set, Little House: The Laura Years (January 1994) comprises volumes 1 and 3–6. Thus it features the Ingalls family until Laura is 14 years old, at the close of the "Long Winter" early in 1881. The second novel, Farmer Boy (1933) features Laura's husband Almanzo Wilder as a boy. He appears in the sixth novel and their courtship begins in the seventh.)

== Plot summary ==
The novel is about the months the Ingalls family spent on the prairie in Montgomery County, Kansas. Laura describes how her father built their one-room log house in Indian Territory, having heard that the government planned to open the territory to white settlers soon.

In contrast to Little House in the Big Woods, the Ingallses face difficulty and danger in this book. They all fall ill from malaria, which was ascribed to breathing the night air or eating watermelon. American Indians are a common sight for them, as their house was built in Osage territory, and Ma's open distrust of Indians contrasts with Laura's more childlike observations about those who live and ride nearby. They begin to congregate at the nearby river bottoms and their war cries unnerve the settlers, who worry they may be attacked, but an Osage chief who was friendly with Pa is able to avert the hostilities.

By the end of the novel, all the family's work is undone when word comes that U.S. soldiers are being sent to remove white settlers from Indian Territory. Pa decides to move his family away before they can be forced to leave.

== Historical background ==
The Ingalls family moved from Wisconsin to Kansas in 1868 (stopping for a while in Rothville, Missouri), and lived there between 1869 and 1870. Carrie was born there in August, and a few weeks after her birth, they were forced to leave the territory (however, in the novel, she is present during the move to Kansas). They moved back to Wisconsin, where they lived the next four years. In 1874 they started for Walnut Grove, Minnesota, stopping for a while in Lake City.

Although Wilder states that Charles had been told that the Kansas territory would soon be up for settlement, their homestead was on the Osage Indian reservation and Charles' information was incorrect. The Ingalls had no legal right to occupy their homestead, and once informed of their error, left the territory despite the fact that they had only just begun farming it. Several of their neighbors stayed and fought the decision.

In an 1871 report to the Bureau of Indian Affairs, the agent in charge of the Osages was highly discouraged by the influx of white settlers on the Osage Diminished Reserve where the Ingalls lived. He mentioned that some white settlers did indeed pull out when they were informed of the error:

The press of Kansas teems with vivid descriptions of "town-sites," and the fertile valley of the Osage country. Numbers have been thus led to believe that the lands were open to settlement. Some who came with their families and stock withdrew when undeceived. Such examples, however, of respect for the laws of the United States, and the rights of others, were lamentably few.

— Isaac T. Gibson

As they were preparing to leave, the Ingalls received word from Wisconsin that the man who purchased their farm near Pepin had defaulted on the mortgage. Since they had to leave Kansas, they decided to go back to Wisconsin and moved back to the farm they had left two years earlier. So instead of heading to Minnesota as the series relates, they headed to Wisconsin and lived there again for a few years before heading west to Minnesota.

== Reception ==
Virginia Kirkus had handled Wilder's debut novel Little House in the Big Woods for Harper & Brothers as its book editor from 1926 to 1932. In Kirkus Reviews, her semimonthly bulletin from 1933, she awarded this novel a starred review (as she did the next three sequels). "Good Americana – and a first rate tale. Personally, I liked it certainly as well, perhaps better than the other."

In 2012, the novel was ranked number 27 among all-time children's novels in a survey published by School Library Journal – the second of three Little House books in the Top 100.

== Locations ==
Location of cabin in Kansas (and metro areas)

In modern day terms,

- the 1869-1871 Kansas cabin was located approximately 2 miles east of the unincorporated community of Wayside in rural Montgomery County, approximately halfway between the cities of Independence and Caney. Their 3rd daughter, Carrie, was born here on August 3, 1870.
- the 1874 Minnesota dugout was located approximately 1.5 miles north of the city of Walnut Grove in rural Redwood County.
