= The Long Winter (novel) =

1940 children's novel by Laura Ingalls Wilder

- Front dust jacket with Sewell's illustration
- Author: Laura Ingalls Wilder
- Illustrator: Helen Sewell and Mildred Boyle; Garth Williams (1953)
- Series: Little House
- Genre: Children's novel Family saga Western
- Publisher: Harper & Brothers
- Publication date: June 15, 1940
- Publication place: United states
- Media type: Print (hardcover)
- Pages: 325; 334 pp.
- ISBN: 0-06-026461-6 (lib. bdg.); 0060264608
- OCLC: 504334768
- LC Class: PZ7.W6461 Lo
- Preceded by: By the Shores of Silver Lake
- Followed by: Little Town on the Prairie

The Long Winter is an autobiographical children's novel written by Laura Ingalls Wilder and published in 1940, the sixth of nine books in her Little House series. It is set in southeastern Dakota Territory during the severe winter of 1880–1881, when she turned 14 years old.

The novel was a runner-up for the Newbery Medal in 1941. All the fourth to eighth Little House books from 1938 to 1943 were Newbery runners-up. In retrospect, they are called Newbery Honor Books.

== Plot summary ==
On a hot August day in 1880, at the Ingallses' homestead in Dakota Territory, Laura offers to help Pa stack hay to feed their stock in the winter. As they work, she notices a muskrat den in the nearby Big Slough. Upon inspecting it, Pa notes that its walls are the thickest he has ever seen, and fears it is a warning that the upcoming winter will be a very hard one.

In mid-October, the Ingallses wake to an early blizzard howling around their poorly insulated claim shanty. Soon afterward, Pa receives another warning from an unexpected source: an old Native American man comes to the general store in town to warn the white settlers that hard winters come in seven-year cycles and the hardest comes at the end of the third cycle. The coming winter is that twenty-first winter, and there will be seven months of blizzards. Pa decides to move his family into his store building in town for the winter.

In town, Laura attends school with her younger sister, Carrie, until the weather becomes too unpredictable to permit them to walk to and from the school building, and coal too scarce to keep it heated. Blizzard after blizzard sweeps through the town over the next few months. Food and fuel become scarce and expensive, as the town depends on the railroad to bring supplies but the frequent blizzards prevent trains from getting through. Eventually, the railroad company suspends all efforts to dig out the trains that are snowed in at Tracy, stranding the town until spring.

With no more coal or wood, the Ingallses learn to use twisted hay for fuel and grind wheat kernels in a coffee mill to make flour for the day's bread. As the last of the town's meager food supplies run out, Laura's future husband, Almanzo Wilder, and his friend, Cap Garland, hear rumors that a settler raised wheat at a claim twenty miles from town. They risk their lives to bring sixty bushels of it to the starving townspeople – enough to last the rest of the winter.

As predicted, the blizzards continue for seven months. Finally, the spring thaw comes and trains begin running again, bringing in much-needed supplies and the Ingallses' long-delayed Christmas barrel from Reverend Alden, containing clothes, presents, and a Christmas turkey. With the long winter finally over, they enjoy their long-delayed Christmas celebration in May.

== History, geography, and current science ==
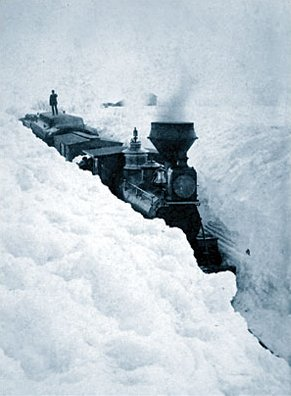
A train stuck in snow in southern Minnesota, March 29, 1881

Wilder's book runs from fall 1880 to spring 1881, a season of such frequent blizzards that it went down in history as "The Snow Winter". Accurate details in the novel include the names of the townspeople (with only minor exceptions), the blizzards' severity and the deep cold, the Chicago and North Western Railway stopping trains until the spring thaw after the snow made the tracks impassable, the near-starvation of the townspeople, and the courage of Almanzo Wilder and Cap Garland, who ventured out on the open prairie in search of a cache of wheat that no one was even sure existed.

The fictionalized material includes the "Indian warning" in an early chapter and the duration and frequency of blizzards. While historical records indicate a larger than usual number of blizzards that winter, Wilder's description of storms lasting on average three days each, with only two to two-and-a-half days' separation, from late October until early April, would imply about 35 separate blizzards during that time frame, which may be dramatic license. Local oral history and research by Wilder's biographers also indicate that Almanzo and Cap traveled about 12 miles (19 km) south of De Smet to find the wheat, not 20 as she states in the novel. Almanzo is portrayed as being roughly six years older than Wilder, when he was in fact eight years older. Aside from these minor variations, however, it is an accurate portrayal of that legendary winter in Dakota Territory.

A 2020 scientific paper analyzed aspects of the winter using the accumulated winter season severity index (AWSSI) model.

== Editing the novel ==
Wilder's editor for her Little House books was her daughter, Rose Wilder Lane, a well-known author and journalist and a prolific ghost writer. John E. Miller, in his biography Becoming Laura Ingalls Wilder, discusses extensive correspondence between Wilder and Lane during the editing process, and includes facsimiles of that correspondence.

== Reception ==
Virginia Kirkus had handled Wilder's debut novel Little House in the Big Woods for Harper & Brothers as its children's book editor from 1926 to 1932. In Kirkus Reviews, her semimonthly bulletin from 1933, she awarded this novel a starred review (as she did all of the 3rd to 6th Little House books). She advised, "Sell as true story material".

The novel was the third of five Newbery Honor books for Wilder, recognizing books 4 to 8 in the series.

In 2012, the novel was ranked number 84 among all-time children's novels in a survey published by School Library Journal, one of three Little House books in the Top 100.

Sometime after its publication, Wilder was approached with a movie script based on the book. She would only approve if she could read over the whole script, however, she noticed that there was added fictitious material and turned it down saying that she wanted no fiction whatsoever and that there were too many inaccuracies. So a film based on the book was never made. The series would not be adapted on screen until 1974 when NBC aired a TV movie based on the 3rd entry in the series, this time following very closely to its source material, it was followed by a TV series that ran for 9 seasons featuring the same cast and running about an hour an episode.
