= West from Home =

Collection of letters sent by Laura Ingalls Wilder

- Front cover of the first edition
- Author: Laura Ingalls Wilder
- Series: Little House
- Genre: Correspondence, travel
- Publisher: Harper & Row
- Publication date: March 1, 1974
- Publication place: United States
- Media type: Print (hardcover)
- Pages: 124 pp.
- ISBN: 0-06-024111-X
- OCLC: 1116569
- LC Class: PS3545.I342 Z55 1974
- Preceded by: On the Way Home
- Followed by: The Rose Years cycle

West from Home is a collection of letters sent by the American journalist Laura Ingalls Wilder to her husband Almanzo Wilder in 1915, published by Harper & Row in 1974 with the subtitle Letters of Laura Ingalls Wilder, San Francisco, 1915. It was edited by Roger MacBride, the literary executor of their daughter Rose Wilder Lane, and provided with a historical "setting by Margot Patterson Doss". Wilder had been sent to San Francisco to write about the 1915 World's Fair and she visited Rose, who lived in that city, when she was 48 years old and Rose 28.

West from Home is sometimes considered part of the Little House series, which is narrowly a series of nine autobiographical children's novels based on Wilder's life from about 1870 to 1894, ages about three to 27. On the Way Home, sometimes considered the preceding Little House book, is a diary of Laura and Almanzo's 1894 migration from South Dakota to Missouri, with setting by Rose Wilder Lane from her childhood recollections.

== Reception ==
Kirkus Reviews observed that "in a sense the well loved chronicler of pioneer childhood had not yet been born", 17 years before Little House in the Big Woods. "The author of these letters home is Mama Bess, a farm wife and occasional contributor to the Missouri Ruralist ...". It concluded, "though students of children's literature might be interested to know that Rose Lane gave her mother help with her writing, Mama's greater preoccupation with recouping a loan made to the Lanes can have mattered to no one but husband Manly. That we find these letters only intermittently interesting can hardly be blamed on Mrs. Wilder who intended them for her husband and friends, but at best they serve as an object lesson proving the English composition cliche 'write about what you know'."
