= On the Way Home =

Diary by Laura Ingalls Wilder

- Front dustjacket, first edition
- Author: Laura Ingalls Wilder
- Subject: Family migration, frontier life
- Genre: Diary, children's literature
- Publisher: Harper & Row
- Publication date: November 12, 1962
- Publication place: United States
- Media type: Print (hardcover)
- Pages: 101 pp.
- OCLC: 317883683
- LC Class: F598 .W54
- Preceded by: The First Four Years (fiction)
- Followed by: West From Home

On the Way Home is the diary of an American farm wife, Laura Ingalls Wilder, during her 1894 migration with her husband Almanzo Wilder and their seven-year-old daughter, Rose, from De Smet, South Dakota, to Mansfield, Missouri, where they settled permanently.

It provides a detailed, daily description of the family's migration and includes commentary by Rose ("a setting by Rose Wilder Lane"). It was published in 1962, after Laura's death, by Harper & Bros., who had published her Little House series of novels. It is sometimes considered part of the series, which is narrowly a series of eight autobiographical children's novels based on Wilder's life from about 1870 to 1894 in South Dakota, ages about three to 27.
