= On the Banks of Plum Creek =

Laura Ingalls Wilder book published 1937

- Front dust jacket with Sewell's illustration
- Author: Laura Ingalls Wilder
- Illustrator: Helen Sewell and Mildred Boyle; Garth Williams (1953)
- Language: English
- Series: Little House
- Genre: Children's novel Family saga Western
- Set in: Redwood County, Minnesota, 1874–76
- Publisher: Harper & Brothers
- Publication date: October 20, 1937
- Publication place: United States
- Media type: Print (hardcover)
- Pages: 239; 338 pp.
- OCLC: 1291009
- Dewey Decimal: 813.52
- LC Class: PZ7.W6461 On
- Preceded by: Little House on the Prairie
- Followed by: By the Shores of Silver Lake

On the Banks of Plum Creek is an autobiographical children's novel written by Laura Ingalls Wilder and published in 1937, the fourth of nine books in her Little House series. It is based on about five years of her childhood when the Ingalls family lived at Plum Creek near Walnut Grove, Minnesota, during the 1870s. The original dust jacket proclaimed: "The true story of an American pioneer family by the author of Little House in the Big Woods".

The novel was a Newbery Honor book in 1938, as were the next four Little House books through 1944.

== Plot summary ==
Location of the dugout "On the Banks of Plum Creek" in Minnesota

Having left their little house on the Kansas prairie, the Ingalls family travels by covered wagon to Minnesota and settles on the banks of Plum Creek. Pa trades their two horses, Pet and Patty, and Pet's colt, Bunny, for a dugout and stable. Later, he trades for two new horses as Christmas presents for his family, which Laura and her sister, Mary, name Sam and David. Pa soon builds a new, above-ground, wooden house for his family, trusting that their first crop of wheat will pay for the lumber and materials.

Now that they live near a town, Laura and Mary go to school for the first time. There they make friends, and also meet the town storekeeper's daughter, Nellie Oleson, who makes fun of Laura and Mary for being "country girls". After Laura and Mary attend a party at the Olesons' home, Ma reciprocates by inviting all the girls to their own party, where Nellie mistreats the Ingalls’ dog, Jack, and speaks rudely to Ma (but Laura feels vindicated when the girls go wading and Nellie gets covered with leeches).

The Ingalls family goes through very hard times when the Locust Plague of 1874 destroys both the much-anticipated wheat crop, and any possibility of a successful crop the following year. For two harvest seasons, Pa is forced to walk 300 miles (480 km) east to find work on other farms. The community's school closes in response to the disaster, spoiling the girls' opportunity to continue attending school.

A severe four-day blizzard hits, delaying Pa's homecoming, but Ma plays games with the girls to keep their spirits up. Finally Pa arrives home; it turns out that he had been within shouting distance of the house throughout the blizzard but had no way of realizing it in the blinding storm. The novel ends with the happy family reunited on Christmas Eve.

== Reception ==
Virginia Kirkus had handled Wilder's debut novel Little House in the Big Woods for Harper & Brothers as its book editor from 1926 to 1932. In Kirkus Reviews, her semi-monthly bulletin from 1933, she awarded this novel a starred review (as she did its one predecessor and two successors, books 3 to 6 and no others). "If anything, it is better than her enchanting Little House in the Big Woods...Laura is always in trouble, but a staunch young person when brought to the text. It is perfect Americana."

The novel was the first of five Newbery Honor books for Wilder, books 4 to 8 in the series.

In 1997, the novel was challenged by two parents from Winnipeg, Canada who took issue with the portrayal of Native Americans in it and wanted a local school division to pull it from its libraries and lessons. The word "Indian", referring to Native Americans, appears 12 times in it, most of them dealing with the Ingalls family's time in Indian Territory. However, at one point Mary tells Laura to keep her sunbonnet on or "You'll be as brown as an Indian, and what will the town girls think of us?" Laura also says, "I wish I was an Indian and never had to wear clothes!" The complaint was eventually withdrawn.

== Publication ==
After failing at farming in the Dakotas in the 1890s—drought, illness, and fire contributing—Wilder moved with her husband, Almanzo, and their young daughter, Rose, to the Ozarks in Missouri. Decades later, after writing columns and editing for a regional farm newspaper, she was encouraged by Rose to write a memoir of growing up on the frontier for national serialization—mostly for financial reasons.

Wilder wrote Pioneer Girl, an adult version of her autobiography, before she wrote her book series. When it proved unsellable to publishers, Rose suggested they rethink it, leading to the series. Some of the real-life events were either softened or taken out entirely for a younger audience.
