= The First Four Years (novel) =

1971 novel by Laura Ingalls Wilder

- Front dust jacket with Williams' illustration
- Author: Laura Ingalls Wilder
- Illustrator: Garth Williams
- Series: Little House
- Genre: Historical novel, realistic fiction, family saga, Western
- Publisher: Harper & Row
- Publication date: February 1, 1971
- Publication place: United States
- Media type: Print (hardcover)
- Pages: 134 pp.
- ISBN: 0060264268
- OCLC: 855276032
- LC Class: PZ7.W6461 Fi
- Preceded by: These Happy Golden Years
- Followed by: On the Way Home

The First Four Years is an autobiographical novel by Laura Ingalls Wilder, published in 1971 and commonly considered the last of nine books in the Little House series. The series had initially concluded (Note: These Happy Golden Years was originally published in 1943 with one page at the end containing the note, "The end of the Little House books.") at eight children's novels following Wilder to mature age and her marriage with Almanzo Wilder.

Roger Lea MacBride found the work in the belongings of Wilder's daughter, Rose Wilder Lane, while going through her estate after her death in 1968. Wilder wrote all of her books in pencil on dime store tablets, and this one's manuscript was found in manuscript form as Wilder had written it.

It is not clear whether Wilder intended this first draft to be a ninth book in the Little House series, or possibly a standalone novel for adults. Much of the material is more for an adult audience than anything in her Little House books. She seems to have written the extant first draft sometime around 1940, and then apparently lost interest in the project. MacBride, Lane's adopted grandson, and executor of her estate, made a decision to publish this novel without any editing (except for minor spelling errors) so it came directly from Wilder's pencil to the written page. Because she never reworked the manuscript - and Lane never edited it as she had her mother's previously published works, the novel is less polished in style than the books of the Little House series, but it is still unmistakably Wilder's writing.

== Plot summary ==
The novel gets its title from a promise Laura made to Almanzo when they became engaged. She did not want to be a farmer, but decided to try farming for three years.

Laura keeps house and Almanzo tends the land and the livestock. They go on frequent pony rides together. At the end of the first year, just as the wheat is ready to harvest, a serious hailstorm destroys the entire crop, which would have made approximately three thousand dollars and paid off their debts on farm equipment and their house.

Faced with mounting debt, Almanzo mortgages the homestead claim. He and Laura have to live on it as a condition of the mortgage, so they rent out their house on the tree claim and Almanzo builds a small home on the homestead claim. Their daughter, Rose, is born in December. At the end of the second year, they harvest a fair wheat crop, and share the proceeds of the wheat sale with the tree claim's renter, making enough money themselves to pay some smaller debts.

In December of the third year, both Laura and Almanzo contract diphtheria, and Almanzo suffers a complication which leaves him permanently impaired physically. The renter decides to leave, and as Almanzo is unable to work both pieces of land, they sell the homestead claim and move back to their first house.

Laura invests money in a flock of sheep. The wool repays her initial investment, leaving only enough to pay the interest on their debts. Meanwhile, the wheat and oats grow well, but are totally ruined just before harvest after several days of hot, dry wind.

At the end of the third year, though farming has not yet been a success, Laura and Almanzo agree to continue for one more year, a "year of grace", in Laura's words, since they have no other prospects and Almanzo believes they just need one good year to turn things around. Unfortunately, hot winds again ruin the next planting of wheat and oats. Their unnamed son is born in August but dies a few weeks later. Finally, their house is destroyed by a flash fire.

Despite this, the novel ends at the close of the fourth year on an optimistic note, with Laura feeling hopeful that their luck will turn. In reality, continual debt and the hot, dry Dakota summers drove Laura and Almanzo from their land. They later settled in Mansfield, Missouri, founding a successful fruit and dairy farm where they lived comfortably until their respective deaths.

== Reception ==
Wilder's first editor at Harper, Virginia Kirkus, had retired from her pre-publication book review service and long retired from writing all of its contents. Of the unfinished novel later marketed as volume 9, Kirkus Reviews wrote in part, "For a moment it's all wrong, this manuscript left unrevised by Mrs. Wilder, and then Manly (never 'Almanzo') takes hold, joking and reasoning and promising ... Compared to its predecessors this is telegraphic, with little dialogue or development of incident; one might also say less fictionalized. and consequently closer to the bone, to the hopes for a good harvest dashed year after year. ... The spirit as well as the format is that of the Little House (though the format will mislead those who expect a functional resemblance)."
