= These Happy Golden Years =

1943 novel by Laura Ingalls Wilder

- Front dust jacket with Sewell's illustration
- Author: Laura Ingalls Wilder
- Illustrator: Helen Sewell and Mildred Boyle; Garth Williams (1953)
- Series: Little House
- Genre: Children's novel Family saga Western
- Publisher: Harper & Brothers
- Publication date: March 17, 1943
- Publication place: United States
- Media type: Print (hardcover)
- Pages: 299; 288 pp.
- OCLC: 2145915
- LC Class: PZ7.W6461 Th
- Preceded by: Little Town on the Prairie
- Followed by: The First Four Years

These Happy Golden Years is an autobiographical children's novel written by Laura Ingalls Wilder and published in 1943, the eighth of nine books in her Little House series – although it originally ended it. It is based on her later adolescence near De Smet, South Dakota, featuring her short time as a teacher, beginning at age 15, and her courtship with Almanzo Wilder. It spans the time period from 1882 to 1885, when they marry.

The novel was a Newbery Honor book in 1944, as were the previous four Little House books.

== Plot summary ==
The novel covers the period in Laura’s life before she marries. At 15, she begins work as a teacher twelve miles away from her home in South Dakota to earn money for her sister Mary's college education. During her tenure, she boards with the head of the school board and his wife. Almanzo, her neighbor back home, begins driving the 24 miles to and from the school so Laura can return home on weekends.

After Laura successfully finishes her tenure and returns home, Almanzo continues to invite Laura out sleighing, beginning their courtship. Laura and Almanzo's romance continues to blossom until he offers her an engagement ring. She accepts his proposal to be married the following summer. When Almanzo tells his family of the engagement, his older sister Eliza Jane (the unfair schoolteacher "Miss Wilder" in Little Town on the Prairie) plans to throw an elaborate wedding. To stop Eliza Jane from taking over their wedding, Laura agrees to be married quickly. She and Almanzo are married quietly in a small ceremony conducted by the local pastor. The novel ends with the newlyweds leaving for the little house Almanzo built for them.

== Historical background ==
"Lew Brewster" was a pseudonym for Louis Bouchie. He was a distant relative of Mr. Boast, a good friend of the Ingallses who appears in several of Laura's books. Besides the fictional character of Nellie Oleson (who was modeled after three different girls whom Wilder knew), Bouchie and his wife were the only people whose names Wilder changed, as Louis Bouchie and his wife, identified as "Lib Brewster" in the story, were unpleasant people and Wilder wished to respect their privacy.

It has been speculated that Mrs. Bouchie may not have been mean or petulant at heart, but besides possibly having inherent mental challenges, (indicated not only by her own fumingly-sulky attitude, but also that of her toxically-hyperactive young son John) she was a victim of an unbalanced diet, overwork, isolation, cabin fever, prairie-wind madness, and possibly even irrational jealousy of the more youthfully attractive Laura who had suddenly joined the household. It's even thought that Mrs. Bouchie might have gotten the wrong idea about why her husband brought Laura to live with them, harboring unwarranted fear and resentment in the mistaken belief that Louis had become dissatisfied with her, and thus his purportedly-innocent reason – to give Laura a place to stay during her teaching stint – had actually been a ruse to allow him to have a younger female in his home.

As stated in Wilder's book, however, the unsociable and perpetually sullen Louis Bouchie seldom displayed any interest in Laura; if anything, he seemed to view her as a burden – his sole reason for boarding her was that he wished to help his relatives (Mr. Boast and the Brewster children in Laura's classes) and Mr. Boast's long-term friends (Charles Ingalls and his family) by providing the local schoolteacher a temporary place to stay.

Today there is a small town called Carthage, South Dakota, where Wilder placed the Brewster settlement, although it is unclear if Carthage grew out of the original Bouchie (Brewster) settlement.

Nellie Oleson, depicted in this story, is actually a combination of two of Wilder's rivals: Genevieve Masters, in the school passages, and Stella Gilbert, in the passages about the buggy rides with Wilder and Almanzo. The news Wilder hears near the end of the book, that "Nellie has gone back East", refers to Genevieve Masters.

Wilder’s daughter, Rose Wilder Lane, helped write, revise, and publish the Little House series. The extent of Lane's role in her mother's Little House book series has remained unclear.

== Themes/Analysis ==
Preeminent American literature scholars John Miller and Ann Romines acknowledge Wilder’s literary talent in articulating feminist western pioneerism. Romines argues that These Happy Golden Years received the least amount of revision and oversight from Lane compared to other books in the series, writing that “these are vital female plots without the end-stops of climax and denouement.” She posits that Ma’s character grows in importance throughout the series and becomes especially pertinent in These Happy Golden Years in contrast to Pa’s pioneering impulses. De Smet embodies contrasting masculine and feminine forces that force Laura to balance earning a living as a teacher, while accepting marriage as her destiny. Laura’s struggle with her feminine identity implicitly resonates with American girls and women, Romines argues, explaining the book’s continuous appeal.

== Reception ==
Virginia Kirkus, Wilder's first editor at Harper, approved the novel in Kirkus Reviews as "a splendid addition to the other fine books in the series". The 3rd to 6th volumes had received starred reviews.

The novel joined the 4th to 7th volumes as Newbery Honor Books.
