= Laura Ingalls Wilder =

American teacher and writer (1867–1957)

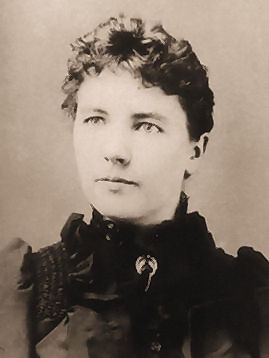
- Wilder, circa 1885
- Born: Laura Elizabeth Ingalls; February 7, 1867; Pepin County, Wisconsin, U.S.
- Died: February 10, 1957 (aged 90); Mansfield, Missouri, U.S.
- Resting place: Mansfield Cemetery, Mansfield, Missouri, U.S.
- Occupations: Writer; teacher; journalist; family farmer
- Spouse: Almanzo Wilder (m. 1885; died 1949)
- Children: 2, including Rose Wilder Lane
- Parents: Charles Ingalls; Caroline Lake Quiner
- Relatives: Mary Ingalls (sister); Caroline "Carrie" Ingalls Swanzey (sister); Charles Frederick "Freddie" Ingalls (brother); Grace Ingalls Dow (sister)
- Writing career
- Period: 1911–1957 (as a writer)
- Genres: Diaries, essays, family saga (children's historical novels)
- Subjects: Midwestern and Western
- Notable works: Little House on the Prairie; Little House series
- Notable awards: Laura Ingalls Wilder Medal est. 1954

Laura Elizabeth Ingalls Wilder (February 7, 1867 – February 10, 1957) was an American writer, teacher, and journalist. She is best known as the author of the children's book series Little House on the Prairie, published between 1932 and 1943, which was based on her childhood in a settler and pioneer family.

== Birth and ancestry ==
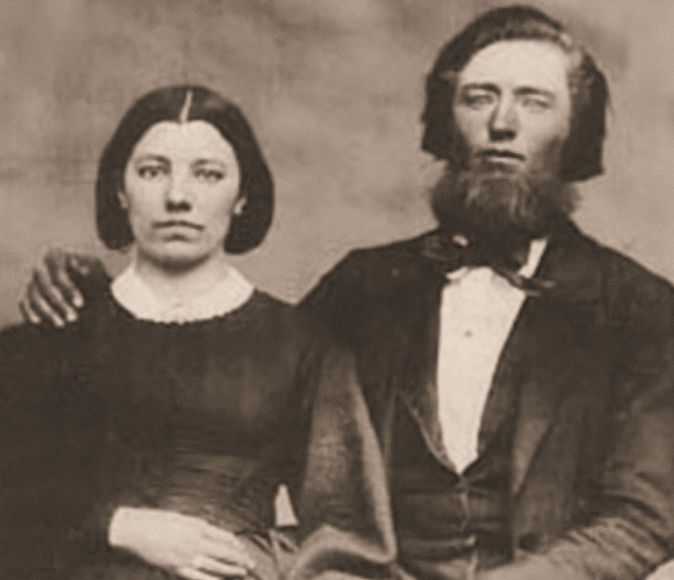
Caroline and Charles Ingalls

Laura Elizabeth Ingalls was born to Charles Phillip and Caroline Lake (née Quiner) Ingalls on February 7, 1867. At the time of her birth, the family lived 7 miles (11 km) north of the village of Pepin, Wisconsin, in the Big Woods region of Wisconsin. Ingalls' home in Pepin became the setting for her first book, Little House in the Big Woods (1932). She was the second of five children, following her older sister, Mary Amelia. Three more children would follow: Caroline Celestia (Carrie); Charles Frederick, who died in infancy; and Grace Pearl. Ingalls's birth site is commemorated by a replica log cabin at the Little House Wayside in Pepin.

Ingalls was a descendant of the Delano family, the ancestral family of U.S. President Franklin Delano Roosevelt. One paternal ancestor, Edmund Ingalls, from Skirbeck, Lincolnshire, England, emigrated to America, settling in Lynn, Massachusetts. In addition, Laura was the 7th great-granddaughter of the Mayflower passenger Richard Warren, and a third cousin once removed of the U.S. President and Civil War General Ulysses S. Grant. The Ingalls family lived near the Quiner family; three of the Ingalls married Quiners.

=== Early life ===
When she was two years old, Laura moved with her family from Wisconsin in 1869. After stopping in Rothville, Missouri, they settled in the Indian country of Kansas, near modern-day Independence, Kansas. Her younger sister, Carrie, was born in Independence in August 1870, not long before they moved again. According to Wilder, her father Charles Ingalls had been told that the location would be open to white settlers, but when they arrived this was not the case. The Ingalls family had no legal right to occupy their homestead because it was on the Osage Indian reservation. They had just begun to farm when they heard rumors that settlers would be evicted, so they left in the spring of 1871. Despite the fact that Little House on the Prairie and Pioneer Girl portrayed their departure as being prompted by rumors of eviction, she also noted that her parents needed to recover their Wisconsin land because the buyer had not paid the mortgage.

The Ingalls family went back to Wisconsin, where they lived for the next three years. Those experiences formed the basis for Wilder's first two novels, Little House in the Big Woods (1932) and the beginning of Little House on the Prairie (1935).

In the book On the Banks of Plum Creek (published in 1939), the third volume of her fictionalized history which takes place around 1874, the Ingalls family moves from Kansas to an area near Walnut Grove, Minnesota, settling in a dugout on the banks of Plum Creek.

Laura Ingalls Wilder dugout location

They moved there from Wisconsin when Ingalls was about seven years old, after briefly living with the family of her uncle, Peter Ingalls, first in Wisconsin and then on rented land near Lake City, Minnesota. In Walnut Grove, the family first lived in a dugout sod house on a preemption claim; after wintering in it, they moved into a new house built on the same land. Two summers of ruined crops led them to move to Iowa. On the way, they stayed again with Charles Ingalls' brother, Peter Ingalls, this time on his farm near South Troy, Minnesota. Her brother, Charles Frederick Ingalls ("Freddie"), was born there on November 1, 1875, dying nine months later in August 1876. In Burr Oak, Iowa, the family helped run a hotel. The youngest of the Ingalls children, Grace, was born there on May 23, 1877. The family moved from Burr Oak back to Walnut Grove, where Charles Ingalls served as the town butcher and justice of the peace. He accepted a railroad job in the spring of 1879, which took him to eastern Dakota Territory, where they joined him that fall. In writing On the Banks of Plum Creek, Wilder omitted the period between 1876 and 1877 when they lived near Burr Oak, skipping directly to the Dakota Territory, featured in By the Shores of Silver Lake (1939).

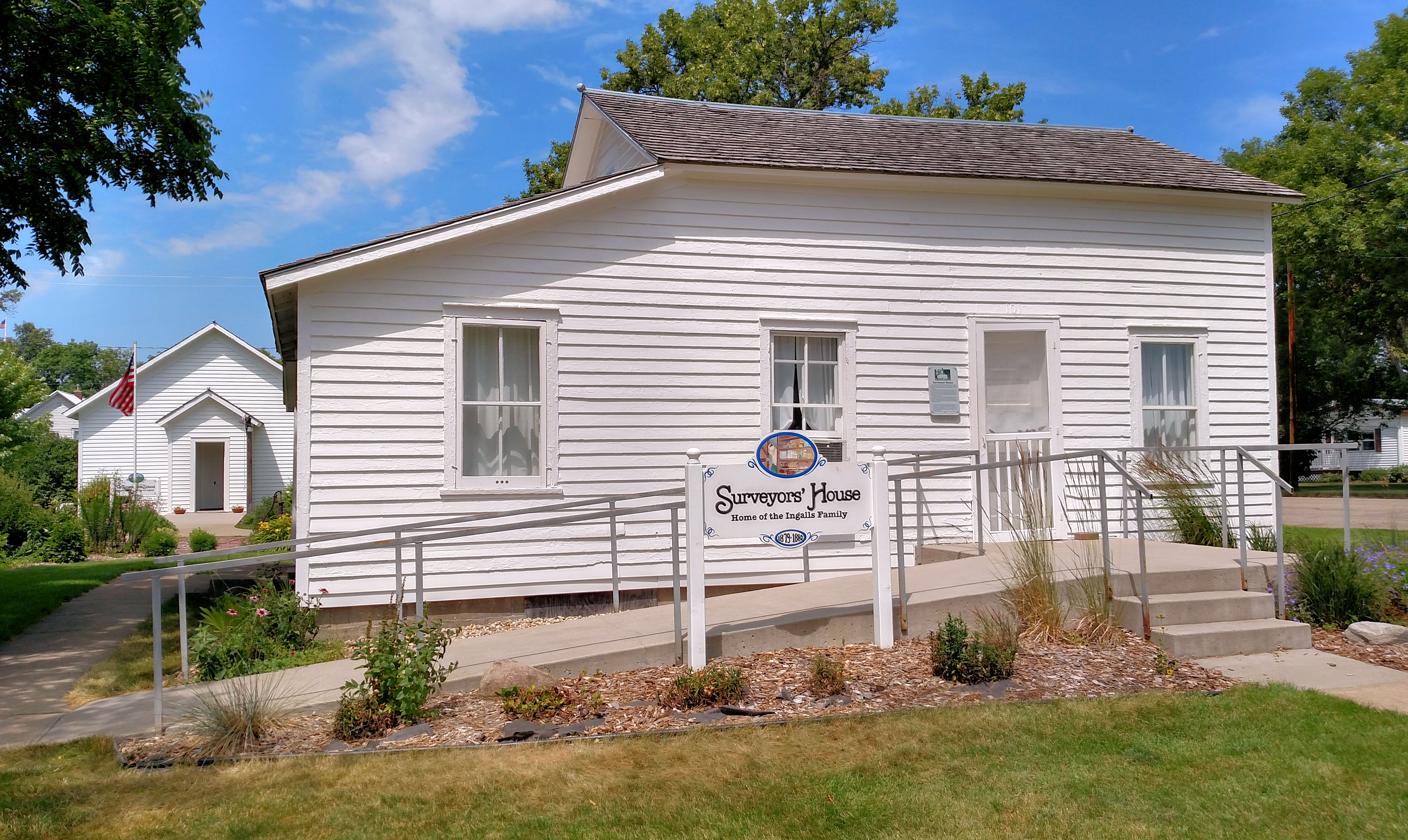
Surveyor's House, the first home in Dakota Territory of the Charles Ingalls family – De Smet, South Dakota

Over the winter of 1879–1880, Charles Ingalls filed for a formal homestead in De Smet, South Dakota. The family spent that mild winter in the surveyor's house. However, the following winter, known as the Hard Winter of 1880–81, was one of the most severe on record in the Dakotas, an ordeal described by Wilder in her novel The Long Winter (1940). Once the family was settled in De Smet, Laura attended school, worked several part-time jobs, and made friends. Among them was bachelor homesteader Almanzo Wilder. This time in her life is documented in the books Little Town on the Prairie (1941) and These Happy Golden Years (1943). Charles and Caroline Ingalls, along with Mary Ingalls, remained in De Smet for the rest of their lives.

=== Young teacher ===
On December 10, 1882, two months before her 16th birthday, Ingalls accepted her first teaching position. She taught three terms in one-room schools when she was not attending school in De Smet. Her original "Third Grade" teaching certificate can be seen on page 25 of William Anderson's book Laura's Album (1998). Between 1883 and 1885, she taught three terms of school, worked for the local dressmaker, and attended high school (without graduating).

=== Early marriage years ===
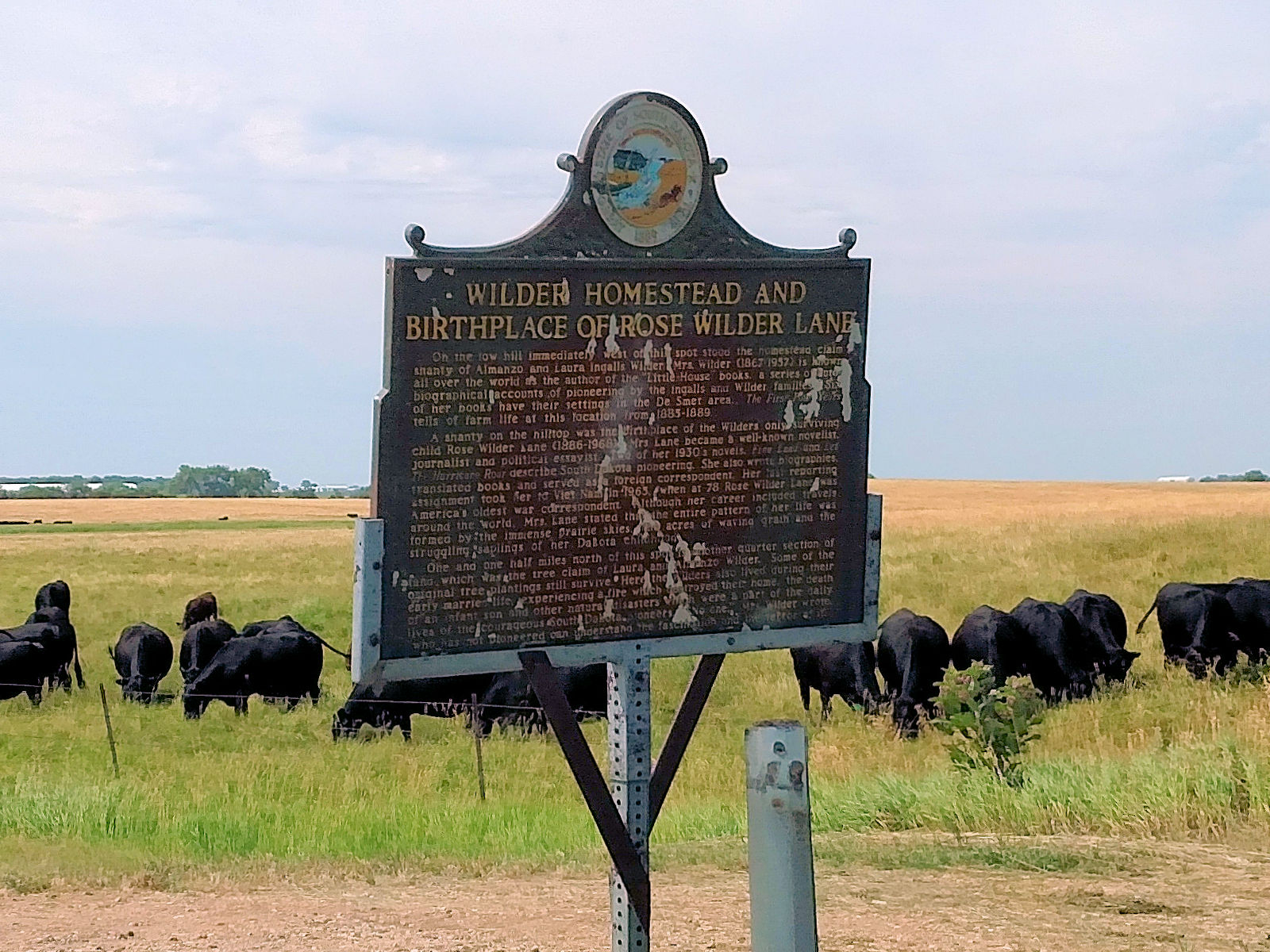
Rose Wilder Lane birthplace roadside marker – De Smet

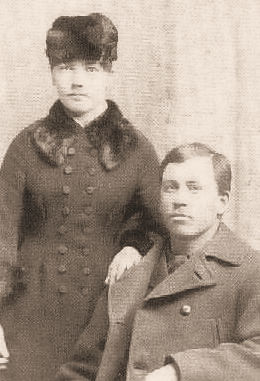
Laura and Almanzo Wilder, circa 1885

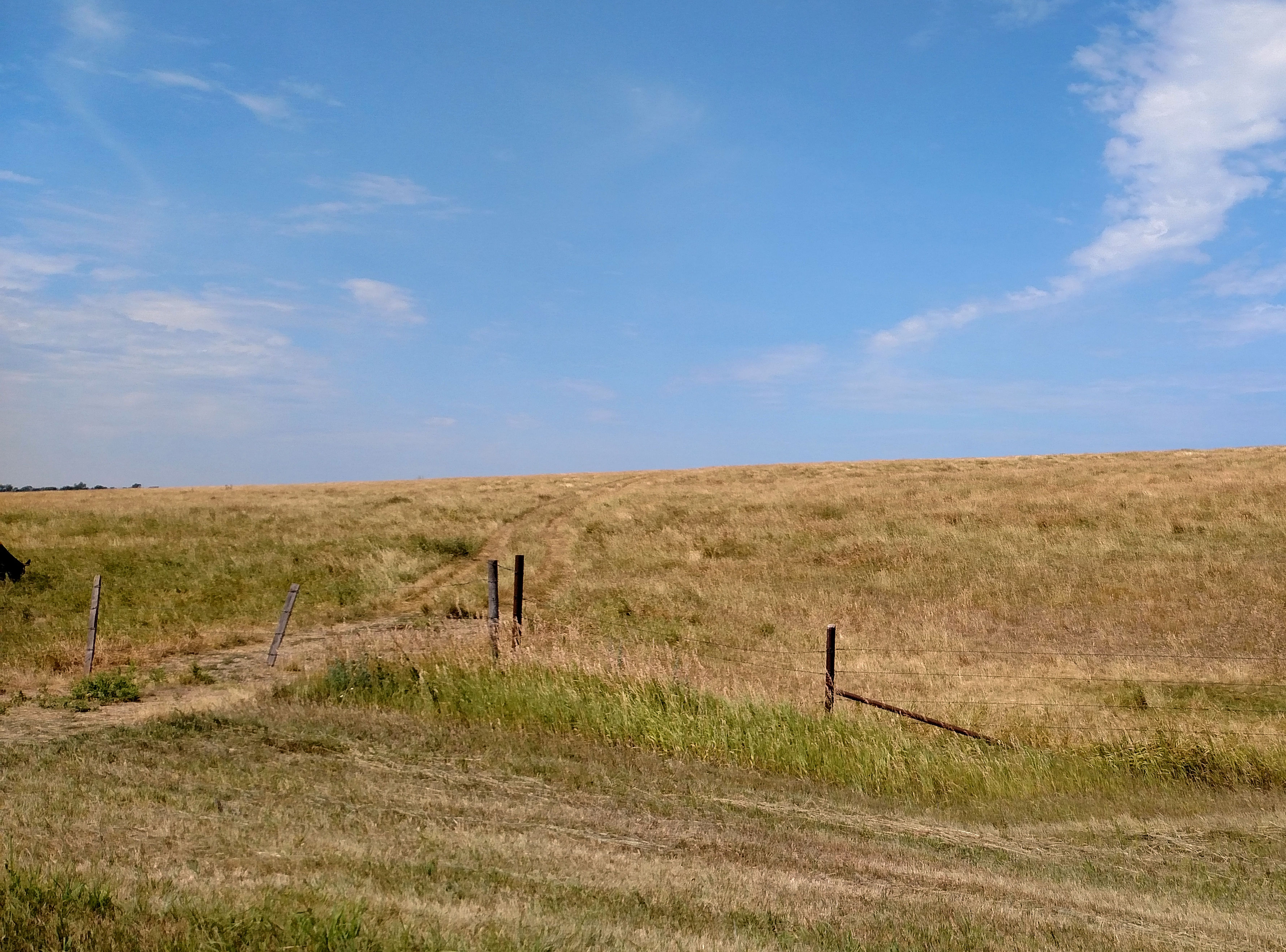
Location of Wilder homestead where both of Wilder's children were born – De Smet

Ingalls' teaching career and studies ended when she married Almanzo Wilder on August 25, 1885, in De Smet, South Dakota. From the beginning of their relationship, the pair had nicknames for each other: she called him "Manly" and he called her "Bess", from her middle name Elizabeth, to avoid confusion with his sister, also named Laura. Almanzo had achieved a degree of prosperity on his homestead claim; the newly married couple started their life together in a new home, north of De Smet.

On December 5, 1886, Wilder gave birth to her daughter, Rose. In 1889, she gave birth to a son who died after 12 days. He had not been named and was buried in De Smet.

Their first few years of marriage were difficult. Complications from a life-threatening bout of diphtheria in 1888 left Almanzo partially paralyzed. He needed a cane for the remainder of his life. After their newborn son's death, their home and their barn, along with its hay and grain, were destroyed by a mysterious fire. It was discovered that the fire was accidentally set by Rose. Several years of severe drought left them in debt, physically ill, and unable to earn a living from their 320 acres (129.5 hectares) of prairie land. These trials were documented in Wilder's book The First Four Years. Around 1890, they left De Smet and spent about a year resting at the home of Almanzo's parents on their Spring Valley, Minnesota farm before moving briefly to Westville, Florida, in search of a climate to improve Almanzo's health. They found the weather disagreeable, felt out of place among the locals, and returned to De Smet in 1892. There they purchased a small home.

In November of 1893, Laura Ingalls Wilder petitioned to join the local Order of the Eastern Star Chapter, Bethlehem #13.

== Move to Mansfield, Missouri ==
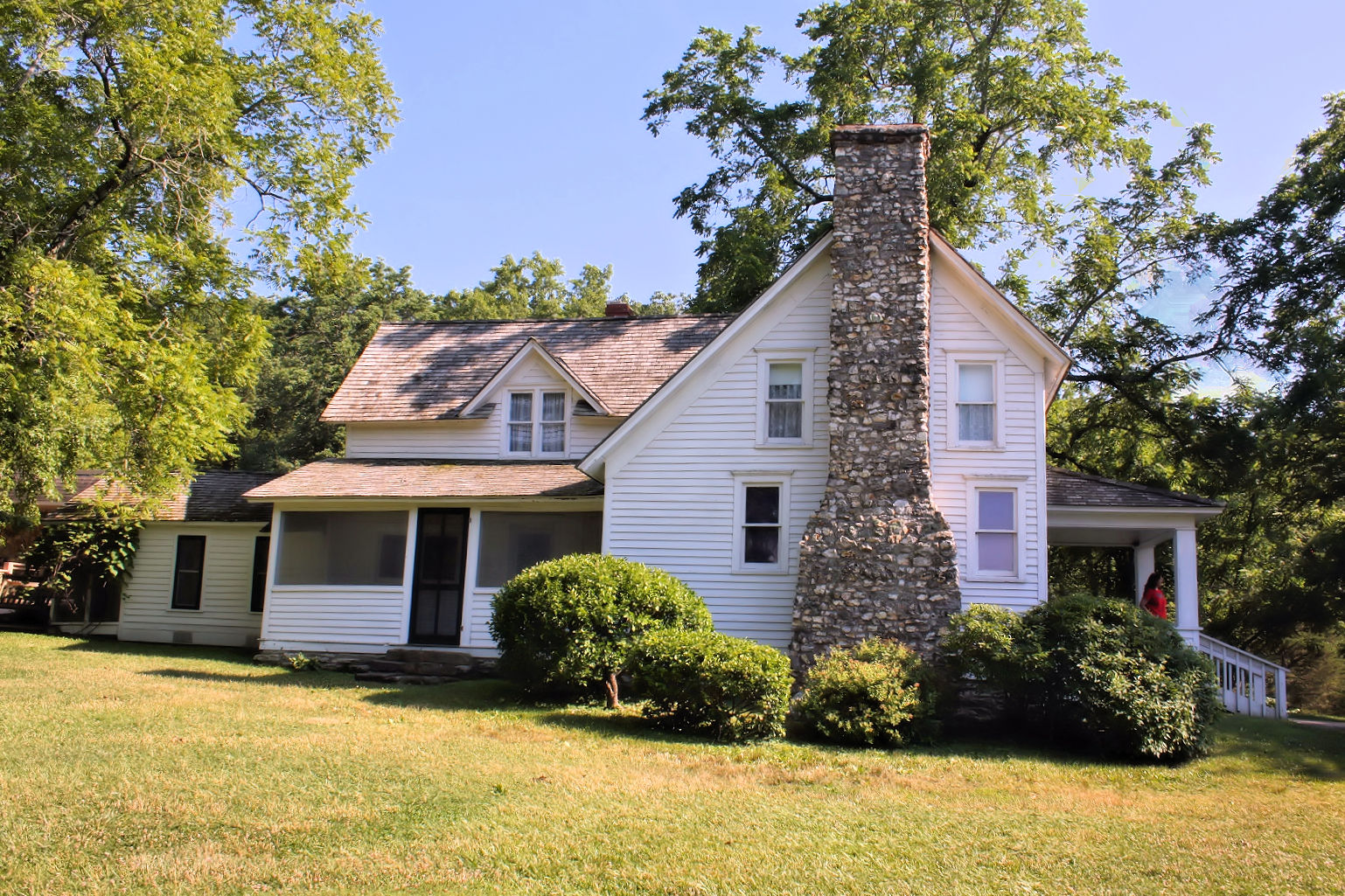
Rocky Ridge Farm, Mansfield, Missouri

In 1894, the Wilders moved to Mansfield, Missouri, and used their savings to make the down payment on an undeveloped parcel of land just outside town. They named the place Rocky Ridge Farm and moved into a ramshackle log cabin. At first, they earned income only from wagon loads of firewood they would sell in town for 50 cents. Financial security came slowly. Apple trees they planted did not bear fruit for seven years. Almanzo's parents visited around that time and gave them the deed to the house they had been renting in Mansfield, which was the economic boost Wilder's family needed. They then added to the property outside town, and eventually accrued nearly 200 acres (80.9 hectares). Around 1910, they sold the house in town, moved back to the farm, and completed the farmhouse with the proceeds. What began as about 40 acres (16.2 hectares) of thickly wooded, stone-covered hillside with a windowless log cabin became in 20 years a relatively prosperous poultry, dairy, and fruit farm, and a 10-room farmhouse.

The Wilders had learned from cultivating wheat as their sole crop in De Smet. They diversified Rocky Ridge Farm with poultry, a dairy farm, and a large apple orchard. Wilder became active in various clubs and was an advocate for several regional farm associations. In 1897, she joined Mansfield Chapter #76, Order of the Eastern Star. In 1902, she served as the Worthy Matron of the chapter.

She was recognized as an authority in poultry farming and rural living, which led to invitations to speak to groups around the region.

== Writing career ==
An invitation to submit an article to the Missouri Ruralist in 1911 led to Wilder's permanent position as a columnist and editor with that publication, which she held until the mid-1920s. She also took a paid position with the local Farm Loan Association, dispensing small loans to local farmers.

Wilder's column in the Ruralist, "As a Farm Woman Thinks", introduced her to a loyal audience of rural Ozarkians, who enjoyed her regular columns. Her topics ranged from home and family, including her 1915 trip to San Francisco, California to visit her now-married daughter, Rose Wilder Lane, and see the Panama-Pacific International Exhibition; to World War I and other world events; to Lane's fascinating world travels; and to her own thoughts on the increasing options offered to women during this era. While the couple were never wealthy until the "Little House" books began to achieve popularity, the farming operation, Wilder's income from writing and the Farm Loan Association provided them with a stable living.

"[By] 1924", according to the Professor John E. Miller, "[a]fter more than a decade of writing for farm papers, Wilder had become a disciplined writer, able to produce thoughtful, readable prose for a general audience."

Around this time her daughter, Lane, began encouraging Wilder to improve her writing skills with a view toward greater success as a writer than Lane had already achieved. The Wilders, according to Miller, had come to "[depend] on annual income subsidies from their increasingly famous and successful daughter." They both had concluded that the solution for improving their retirement income was for Wilder to become a successful writer herself. As a start, Lane helped Wilder publish two articles describing the interior of the farmhouse, in Country Gentleman magazine. However, the "project never proceeded very far."

In 1928, Lane hired out the construction of an English-style stone cottage for her parents on property adjacent to the farmhouse they had personally built and still inhabited. She remodeled and took it over.

The Stock Market Crash of 1929 wiped the Wilders out; Lane's investments were devastated as well. They still owned the 200-acre (81-hectare) farm, but they had invested most of their savings with Lane's broker.

In 1930, Wilder requested Lane's opinion about an autobiographical manuscript she had written about her pioneering childhood. The Great Depression, coupled with the deaths of Wilder's mother in 1924 and her older sister in 1928, seem to have prompted her to preserve her memories in a life story called Pioneer Girl. She also hoped that her writing would generate some additional income.

The original title of the first of the books was When Grandma Was a Little Girl. On the advice of Lane's publisher, she greatly expanded the story. As a result of Lane's publishing connections as a successful writer and after editing by her, Harper & Brothers published Wilder's book in 1932 as Little House in the Big Woods. After its success, she continued writing. The close and often rocky collaboration between her and Lane continued, in person until 1935, when Lane permanently left Rocky Ridge Farm, and afterward by correspondence.

The collaboration worked both ways: two of Lane's most successful novels, Let the Hurricane Roar (1932) and Free Land (1938), were written at the same time as the "Little House" series and basically retold Ingalls and Wilder family tales in an adult format.

=== Authorship ===
Some, including Lane's biographer William Holtz, have alleged that Wilder's daughter was her ghostwriter. Existing evidence including ongoing correspondence between the women about the books' development, Lane's extensive diaries, and Wilder's handwritten manuscripts with edit notations shows an ongoing collaboration between the two women.

Miller, using this record, describes varying levels of involvement by Lane. Little House in the Big Woods (1932) and These Happy Golden Years (1943), he notes, received the least editing. "The first pages...and other large sections of [Big Woods]," he observes, "stand largely intact, indicating...from the start...[Laura's] talent for narrative description." Some volumes saw heavier participation by Lane, while The First Four Years (1971) appears to be exclusively a Wilder work. Miller concludes that, "[i]n the end, the lasting literary legacy remains that of the mother more than that of the daughter.... Lane possessed style; Wilder had substance."

The controversy over authorship is often tied to the movement to read the Little House series through an ideological lens. Lane emerged in the 1930s as an avowed conservative polemicist and critic of the Franklin D. Roosevelt administration and his New Deal programs. According to a 2012 article in the New Yorker, "When Roosevelt was elected, she noted in her diary, 'America has a dictator.' She prayed for his assassination, and considered doing the job herself." Whatever Lane's politics, "attacks on [Wilder's] authorship seem aimed at infusing her books with ideological passions they just don't have."

On the topic of historical fiction and its influence on modern views of race relations, literary scholar Rachelle Kuehl notes that Wilder's Little House series has received backlash for her portrayal of Native Americans.

=== Enduring appeal ===
The original Little House books, written for elementary school–age children, became an enduring, eight-volume record of pioneering life late in the 19th century. Irene Smith said shortly after These Happy Golden Years (1943) was published that Wilder began "with a style appealing to the eight-year-olds and continuing in volumes of increasing length and difficulty. This graduation is a distinguishing feature of the Little House books." The First Four Years, about the early days of the Wilder marriage, was discovered by her literary executor Roger MacBride after Lane's 1968 death and published in 1971, unedited by Lane or MacBride. It is now marketed as the ninth volume.

Since the publication of Little House in the Big Woods (1932), the books have been continuously in print and have been translated into 40 other languages. Wilder's first—and smallest—royalty check from Harper, in 1932, was for $500, equivalent to $11,800 in 2025. By the mid-1930s the royalties from the Little House books brought a steady and increasingly substantial income to the Wilders for the first time in their 50 years of marriage. The collaboration also brought the two writers at Rocky Ridge Farm the money they needed to recoup the loss of their investments in the stock market. Various honors, huge amounts of fan mail, and other accolades were bestowed on Wilder.

=== Autobiography: Pioneer Girl ===
In 1929–1930, in her early 60s, Wilder began writing her autobiography, titled Pioneer Girl. It was rejected by publishers. At Lane's urging, she rewrote most of her stories for children. The result was the Little House series of books. In 2014, the South Dakota State Historical Society published an annotated version of Wilder's autobiography, titled Pioneer Girl: The Annotated Autobiography.

Pioneer Girl includes stories that Wilder felt were inappropriate for children: e.g., a man accidentally immolating himself while drunk, and an incident of extreme violence of a local shopkeeper against his wife, which ended with his setting their house on fire. She also describes previously unknown facets of her father's character. According to its publisher, "Wilder's fiction, her autobiography, and her real childhood are all distinct things, but they are closely intertwined." The book's aim was to explore the differences, including incidents with conflicting or non-existing accounts in one or another of the sources.

== Later life and death ==
Upon Lane's departure from Rocky Ridge Farm, Laura and Almanzo moved back into the farmhouse they had built, which had most recently been occupied by friends. From 1935 on, they were alone at Rocky Ridge Farm. Most of the surrounding area (including the property with the stone cottage Lane had built for them) was sold, but they still kept some farm animals, and tended their flower beds and vegetable gardens. Almost daily, carloads of fans stopped by, eager to meet the "Laura" of the Little House books.

The Wilders lived independently and without financial worries until Almanzo's death at the farm in 1949. Laura remained on the farm. For the next eight years, she lived alone, looked after by a circle of neighbors and friends. She continued an active correspondence with her editors, fans, and friends during these years.

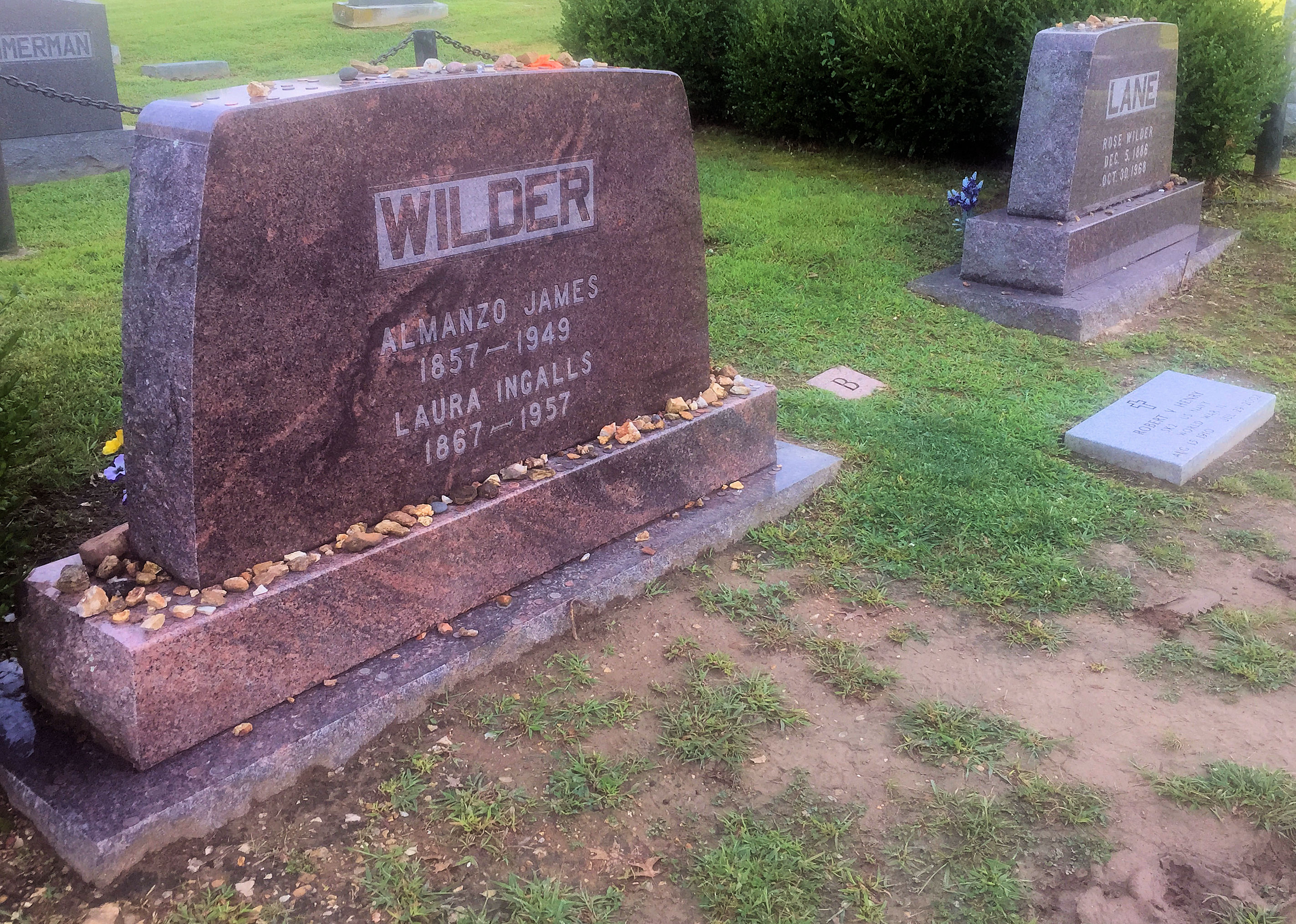
Gravesite of Laura Ingalls Wilder and husband Almanzo Wilder at Mansfield Cemetery, Mansfield, Missouri. Buried next to them is daughter Rose Wilder Lane.

In the fall of 1956, 89-year-old Wilder became severely ill from undiagnosed diabetes and cardiac issues. She was hospitalized by Lane, who had arrived for Thanksgiving. She was able to return home the day after Christmas. Despite this, her health began to decline after her release from the hospital, and she died at home in her sleep on February 10, 1957, aged 90. She was buried beside Almanzo at Mansfield Cemetery in Mansfield. Lane was buried next to them on her death in 1968.

=== Estate ===
Following Wilder's death, possession of Rocky Ridge Farm passed to the farmer who had earlier bought the property under a life lease arrangement. The local population put together a non-profit corporation to purchase the house and its grounds for use as a museum. After some wariness at the notion of seeing the house rather than the books be a shrine to Wilder, Lane came to believe that making a museum of it would draw long-lasting attention to the books. She donated the money needed to purchase the house and make it a museum, agreed to make significant contributions each year for its upkeep, and donated many of her parents' belongings.

In compliance with Wilder's will, Lane inherited ownership of the Little House literary estate, with the stipulation that it be for only her lifetime, with all rights reverting to the Mansfield library after her death. Following her death in 1968, however, her chosen heir as well as her business agent and lawyer, Roger MacBride, gained control of the books' copyrights. The copyrights to each of Wilder's "Little House" books, as well as those of Lane's own literary works, were renewed in his name after the original copyright had expired.

Controversy arose following MacBride's death in 1995, when the Laura Ingalls Wilder Branch of the Wright County Library in Mansfield—the library founded in part by Wilder—tried to recover the rights to the series. The ensuing court case was settled in an undisclosed manner, with MacBride's heirs retaining the rights to Wilder's books. From the settlement, the library received enough to start work on a new building.

The popularity of the Little House books has grown over the years following Wilder's death, spawning a multimillion-dollar franchise of mass merchandising under MacBride's impetus. Results of the franchise have included additional spinoff book series—some written by MacBride and his daughter, Abigail—and the long-running television series, starring Melissa Gilbert as Wilder and Michael Landon as her father.

== Political views ==
Wilder has been referred to by some as one of America's first libertarians. She was a long-time Democrat, but became dismayed with Roosevelt's New Deal and what she and her daughter, Rose Wilder Lane, saw as Americans' increasing dependence on the federal government. Wilder grew disenchanted with her party and resented government agents who came to farms like hers and grilled farmers about the number of acres they were planting. Her daughter was similarly a strong libertarian.

Wilder supported women's rights (though she worried that women would vote according to what their husbands wanted, and not as they wanted) and education reform. She also became infamous for a short period for shaking the hand of an African-American man in segregated Missouri. Indeed, part of the plot of Little House on the Prairie involves an African-American doctor saving the Ingalls family's lives.

== Works ==
Because she died in 1957, Wilder's works are now public domain in countries where the term of copyright lasts 50 years after the author's death, or less; generally this does not include works first published posthumously. Works first published before 1929 or where copyright was not renewed, primarily her newspaper columns, are also public domain in the United States.

=== Little House books ===
The eight "original" Little House books were published by Harper & Brothers with illustrations by Helen Sewell (the first three) or by Sewell and Mildred Boyle.

- Little House in the Big Woods (1932) – named to the inaugural Lewis Carroll Shelf Award list in 1958
- Farmer Boy (1933) – about Almanzo Wilder growing up in New York
- Little House on the Prairie (1935)
- On the Banks of Plum Creek (1937) (Note: Five times from 1938 to 1944 Wilder was one of the runners-up for the American Library Association Newbery Medal, recognizing the previous year's "most distinguished contribution to American literature for children". The honored works were the last five of eight books in the Little House series that were published in her lifetime.)
- By the Shores of Silver Lake (1939)
- The Long Winter (1940)
- Little Town on the Prairie (1941)
- These Happy Golden Years (1943)

=== Other works ===
- On the Way Home (1962, published posthumously) – diary of the Wilders' move from De Smet, South Dakota, to Mansfield, Missouri, edited and supplemented by Rose Wilder Lane
- The First Four Years (1971, published posthumously by Harper & Row), illustrated by Garth Williams – commonly considered the ninth Little House book
- West from Home (1974, published posthumously), ed. Roger Lea MacBride – Wilder's letters to Almanzo while visiting her daughter Rose Wilder-Lane in 1915 in San Francisco
- Little House in the Ozarks: The Rediscovered Writings (1991) LCCN 91-10820 – collection of pre-1932 articles
- The Road Back Home, part three (the only part previously unpublished) of A Little House Traveler: Writings from Laura Ingalls Wilder's Journeys Across America (2006, Harper) LCCN 2005-14975 – Wilder's record of a 1931 trip with Almanzo to De Smet, South Dakota, and the Black Hills
- A Little House Sampler (1988 or 1989, U. of Nebraska), with Rose Wilder Lane, ed. William Anderson, OCLC 16578355
- Writings to Young Women – Volume One: On Wisdom and Virtues, Volume Two: On Life as a Pioneer Woman, Volume Three: As Told by Her Family, Friends, and Neighbors
- A Little House Reader: A Collection of Writings (1998, Harper), ed. William Anderson
- Laura Ingalls Wilder & Rose Wilder Lane, 1937–1939 (1992, Herbert Hoover Presidential Library), ed. Timothy Walch – selections from letters exchanged by Wilder and Lane, with family photographs, OCLC 31440538
- Laura's Album: A Remembrance Scrapbook of Laura Ingalls Wilder (1998, Harper), ed. William Anderson, OCLC 865396917
- Pioneer Girl: The Annotated Autobiography (South Dakota Historical Society Press, 2014)
- Before the Prairie Books: The Writings of Laura Ingalls Wilder 1911–1916: The Small Farm
- Before the Prairie Books: The Writings of Laura Ingalls Wilder 1917–1918: The War Years
- Before the Prairie Books: The Writings of Laura Ingalls Wilder 1919–1920: The Farm Home
- Before the Prairie Books: The Writings of Laura Ingalls Wilder 1921–1924: A Farm Woman
- Laura Ingalls Wilder's Most Inspiring Writings
- Laura Ingalls Wilder: A Pioneer Girl's World View: Selected Newspaper Columns (Little House Prairie Series)
- The Selected Letters of Laura Ingalls Wilder, edited by William Anderson
- Laura Ingalls Wilder Farm Journalist: Writings from the Ozarks, edited by Stephen W. Hines
- Laura Ingalls Wilder's Fairy Poems, Introduced and compiled by Stephen W. Hines

== Legacy ==
=== Documentaries ===
Little House on the Prairie: The Legacy of Laura Ingalls Wilder (February 2015) is a one-hour documentary film that looks at the life of Wilder. Wilder's story as a writer, wife, and mother is explored through interviews with scholars and historians, archival photography, paintings by frontier artists, and dramatic re-enactments.

Laura Ingalls Wilder: Prairie to Page (2020) is an 83-minutes documentary covering the life of Wilder, the authorship of the Little House books, the making of the television series, and her legacy.

=== Historic sites and museums ===
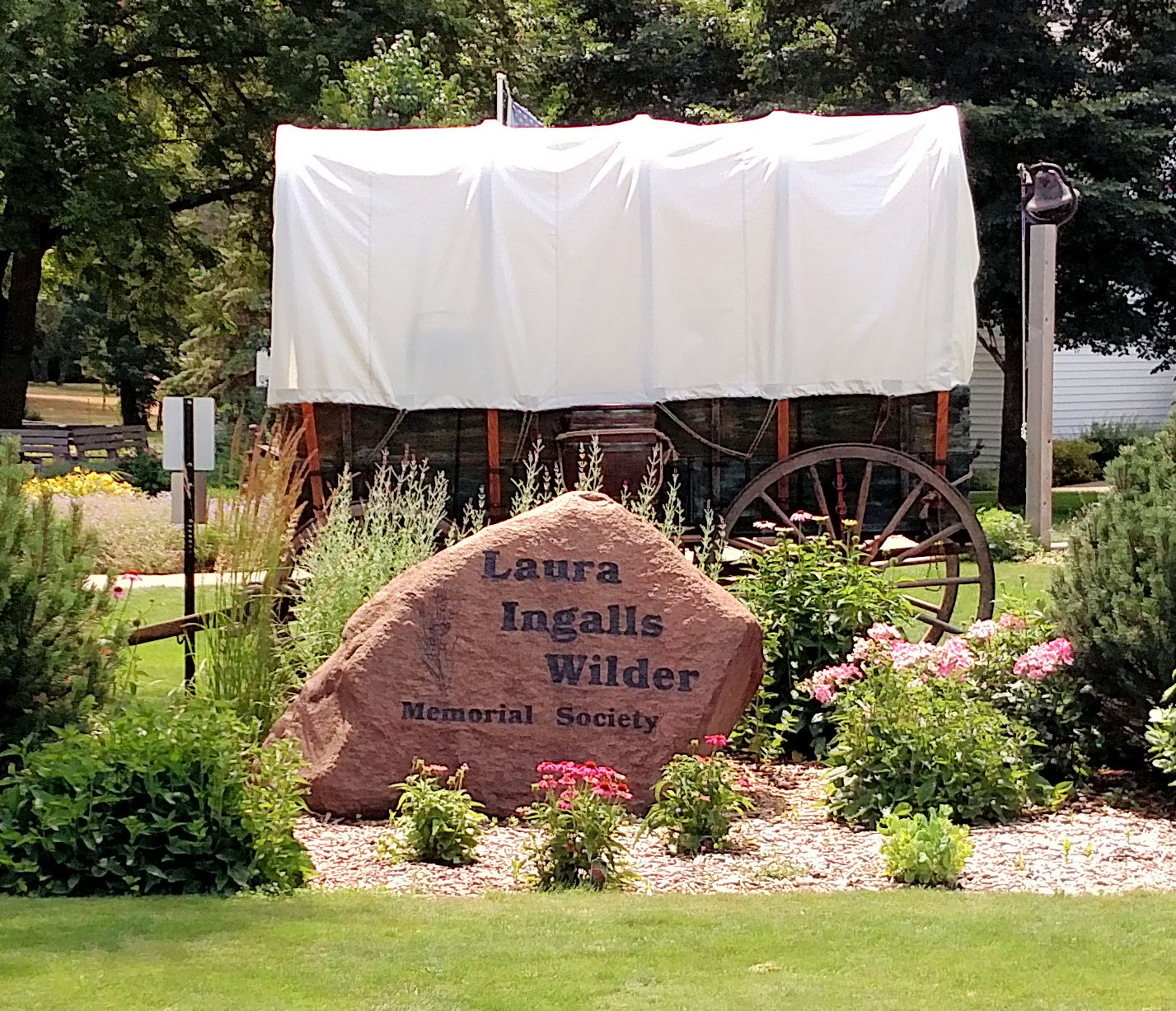
Laura Ingalls Wilder Memorial Society – De Smet, SD

- Laura Ingalls Wilder House and Museum, Mansfield, Missouri
- Laura Ingalls Wilder Museum, Pepin, Wisconsin
- Laura Ingalls Wilder Museum, Walnut Grove, Minnesota
- Laura Ingalls Wilder Memorial Society museum and historic homes, De Smet, South Dakota; annual pageant performed here
- Laura Ingalls Wilder Park and Museum, Burr Oak, Iowa
- Little House on the Prairie Museum, Independence, Kansas
- Wilder Homestead, Malone, NY
- De Smet Cemetery in Kingsbury County, South Dakota, where many Little House Ingalls family members are buried

=== Portrayals on screen and stage ===
Multiple adaptations of Wilder's Little House on the Prairie book series have been produced for screen and stage. In them, the following actresses have portrayed Wilder:

- Melissa Gilbert in the television series Little House on the Prairie and its movie sequels (1974–1984)
- Kazuko Sugiyama (voice) in the Japanese anime series Laura, The Prairie Girl (1975–1976)
- Meredith Monroe, Tess Harper (elder version), Alandra Bingham (younger version, part 1), Michelle Bevan (younger version, part 2) in part 1 and part 2 of the Beyond the Prairie: The True Story of Laura Ingalls Wilder television films (2000 and 2002)
- Kyle Chavarria in the TV miniseries Little House on the Prairie (2005)
- Kara Lindsay in the Little House on the Prairie book musical (2008–2010)
- Alice Halsey in the Netflix TV series Little House on the Prairie (2026-)

=== Wilder Medal ===
Wilder was five times a runner-up for the annual Newbery Medal, the premier American Library Association (ALA) book award for children's literature. In 1954, the ALA inaugurated a lifetime achievement award for children's writers and illustrators, named for Wilder, of which she was the first recipient. The Laura Ingalls Wilder Medal recognizes a living author or illustrator whose books, published in the United States, have made "a substantial and lasting contribution to literature for children". As of 2013, it has been conferred nineteen times, biennially starting in 2001. In 2018, the award was renamed the Children's Literature Legacy Award in light of language in Wilder's works which the Association perceived as biased against Native Americans and African Americans.

=== Other ===
- Google Doodle commemorated her 148th birthday in 2015.
- Hall of Famous Missourians at the Missouri State Capitol – a bronze bust depicting Wilder is on permanent display in the rotunda. She was inducted in 1993.
- Missouri Walk of Fame – Wilder was honored on the Walk in 2006.
- Wilder crater on the planet Venus was named after Wilder.
- The Wilder Life: My Adventures in the Lost World of ‘Little House on the Prairie’, 2011 book by Wendy McClure
