= Little House in the Big Woods =

1932 novel by Laura Ingalls Wilder

- Front dust jacket with Sewell's illustration
- Author: Laura Ingalls Wilder
- Illustrator: Helen Sewell; Garth Williams (1953)
- Language: English
- Series: Little House
- Genre: Children's literature Family saga Western
- Set in: Pepin County, Wisconsin, 1871–72
- Publisher: Harper & Brothers
- Publication date: 1932
- Publication place: United States
- Media type: Print (hardcover)
- Pages: 176; 237 pp.
- OCLC: 2365122
- Dewey Decimal: 813.52
- LC Class: PZ7.W6461 Li
- Followed by: Little House on the Prairie
- Text: Little House in the Big Woods online

Little House in the Big Woods is an autobiographical children's novel written by Laura Ingalls Wilder and published by Harper in 1932 (reviewed in June). It was Wilder's first book published and it inaugurated her Little House series. It is based on memories of her early childhood in the Big Woods near Pepin, Wisconsin, in the early 1870s.

== Plot summary ==
Location of the "Little House in the Big Woods" in Wisconsin

The novel describes the homesteading skills Laura observed and began to practice during her fifth year. It does not contain the more mature (yet real) themes addressed in later books of the series (conflicts with Native Americans, serious illness, death, drought, and crop destruction). Hard work is the rule, though fun is often made in the midst of it. Laura gathers wood chips, and helps Ma and Pa when they butcher animals and preserve the meat. This is all in preparation for the upcoming winter. Fall is a very busy time, because the harvest from the garden and fields must be brought in as well.

The cousins come for Christmas that year, and Laura receives a rag doll, which she names Charlotte. Later that winter, the Ingalls family go to Grandma Ingalls’s house and have a “sugaring off,” where they harvest sap and make maple syrup. They return home with buckets of syrup, enough to last the year. Laura remembered that sugaring off, and the dance that followed, for the rest of her life.

Each season has its work, which Laura makes attractive by the good things that it brings. In the spring, the cow has a calf, so there is milk, butter and cheese. Everyday housework is also described in detail.

That summer and fall, the Ingalls family again plant a garden and fields, and store food for the winter. Pa trades labor with other farmers so that his own crops will be harvested faster when it is time. Not all work was farming. Hunting and gathering were important parts of providing for the Ingalls family as well. When Pa went into the woods to hunt, he usually came home with a deer and then smoked the meat for the coming winter. One day he noticed a bee tree and returned early to get the wash tub and milk pail to collect the honey. When he returned in winter evenings, Laura and Mary always begged him to play his fiddle; he was too tired from farm work to play during summer. They enjoyed the comforts of their home and danced to Pa’s fiddle playing.

== Reception ==
The novel (price two dollars) was reviewed at length for the New York Herald Tribune in its June 12 issue. Jessie Hirsohl advised: "It should be read by all Middle Border children — and by many others to whom its experiences will not be even an echo of word-of-mouth inheritance. Too few, nowadays, can tell as real and treasurable a story... Moreover, this story is delightfully told." In conclusion, "The book's make-up is entirely in character—a homespun-color linen jacket, and inner boards calicoed with tiny strawberry leaves and blossoms. The illustrations are by Helen Sewell, and are pleasantly reminiscent of woodcuts and daguerreotypes."

Based on a 2007 online poll, the U.S. National Education Association listed the novel as one of its "Teachers' Top 100 Books for Children". In 2012, it was ranked number 19 on a list of the top 100 children's novels published by School Library Journal, the first of three Little House books in the Top 100.

== Bibliography ==
- Anderson, William. Laura’s Album: a remembrance scrapbook of Laura Ingalls Wilder. New York: HarperCollins Publishers. 1998. ISBN 0-06-027842-0.
- Anderson, William. Laura Ingalls Wilder: The Iowa Story. Burr Oak, Iowa. The Laura Ingalls Wilder Park and Museum. 2001. ISBN 0-9610088-9-X
- Anderson, William. Prairie Girl: The Life of Laura Ingalls Wilder. New York: HarperCollins Publishers. 2004. ISBN 0-06-028974-0
- Anderson, William. The Little House Guidebook. New York: HarperCollins Publishers. 1996. ISBN 0-06-446177-7
- Garson, Eugenia and Haufrecht, Herbert. The Laura Ingalls Wilder Songbook: Favorite Songs from the Little House Books. New York: HarperCollins Children's Books. 1996. ISBN 0-06-027036-5
- Gormley, Beatrice. Laura Ingalls Wilder: Young Pioneer. New York: Aladdin Paperbacks. 2001. ISBN 0-689-83924-3
- Ward, S. Meet Laura Ingalls Wilder. New York: Rosen Publishing Group. 2001. ISBN 0-8239-5712-8
- Wilder, Laura Ingalls. Dear Laura: Letters From Children To Laura Ingalls Wilder. New York: HarperCollins Publishers. 1996. ISBN 0-06-026274-5
- Wilder, Laura Ingalls. Little House in the Big Woods. New York: HarperCollins Publishers. 1953. ISBN 0-06-026430-6
- Wilder, Laura Ingalls. A Little House Traveler: Writings from Laura Ingalls Wilder’s Journey Across America. New York: HarperCollins Publishers. 2006. ISBN 0-06-072491-9
