= De Smet Cemetery =

Historic cemetery in South Dakota, U.S.

Coordinates: 44°22′04″N 97°34′14″W

- Interactive map of De Smet Cemetery

Details
- Location: De Smet, South Dakota

De Smet Cemetery is a cemetery located southwest of the town of De Smet in Kingsbury County, South Dakota, United States. Numerous family members from the Laura Ingalls Wilder Little House books are buried there.

== People buried in De Smet Cemetery ==
- Robert Boast, appeared in a number of the books by Laura Ingalls Wilder
- Reverend Edward Brown, appeared in two of the books by Laura Ingalls Wilder
- Florence Garland Dawley, teacher in De Smet during the Hard Winter of 1880–81
- Caroline Ingalls, "Ma" from the "Little House" books by Laura Ingalls Wilder
- Charles Ingalls, "Pa" from the "Little House" books by Laura Ingalls Wilder
- Mary Ingalls, sister of Laura Ingalls Wilder
- Carrie Ingalls, sister of Laura Ingalls Wilder
- Grace Ingalls, sister of Laura Ingalls Wilder
- Genevieve Masters, "Nellie Oleson"
- Baby Son Wilder, son of Laura Ingalls Wilder and Almanzo Wilder

=== Ingalls family plot image gallery ===
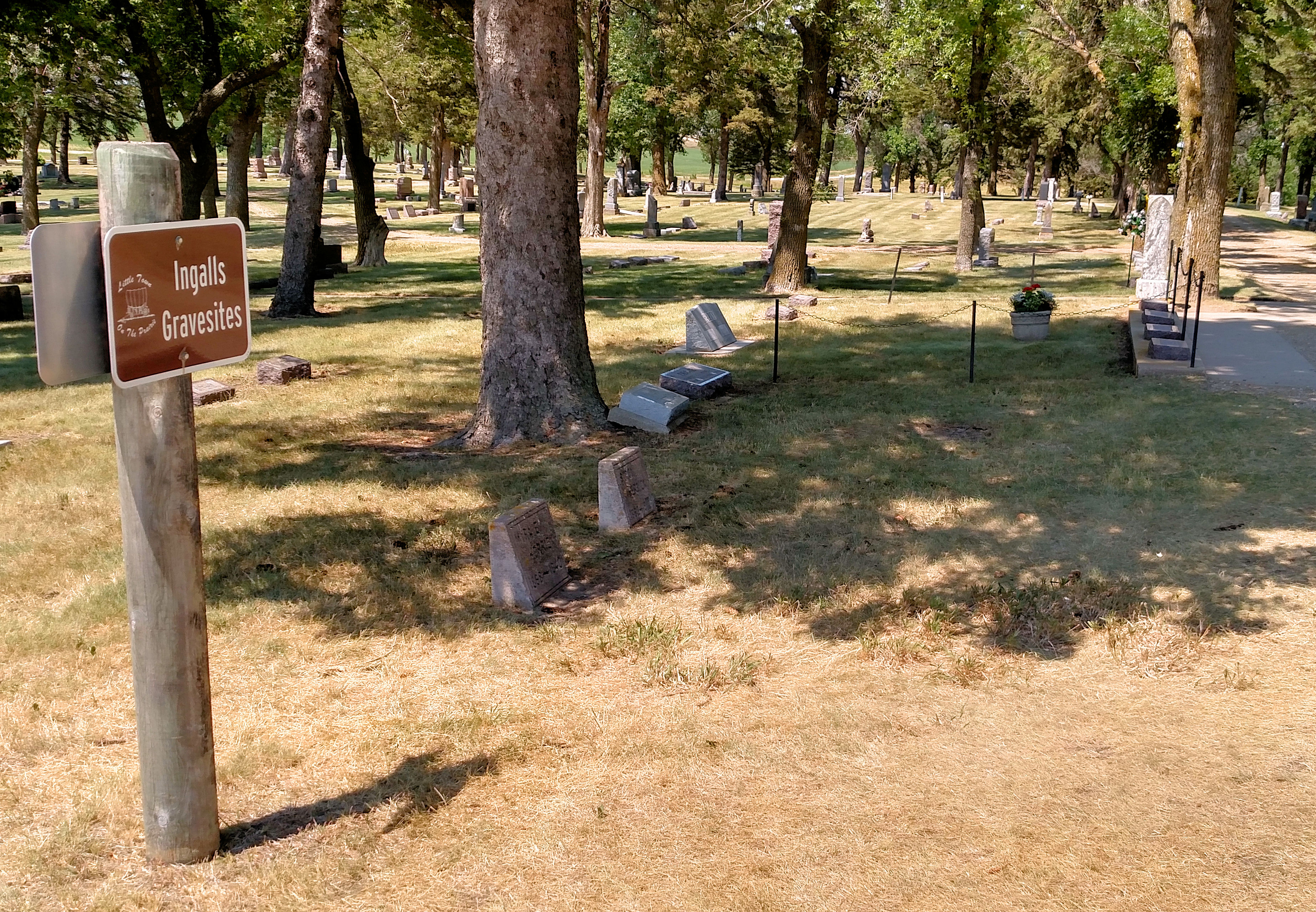
Ingalls family gravesite, De Smet Cemetery, South Dakota

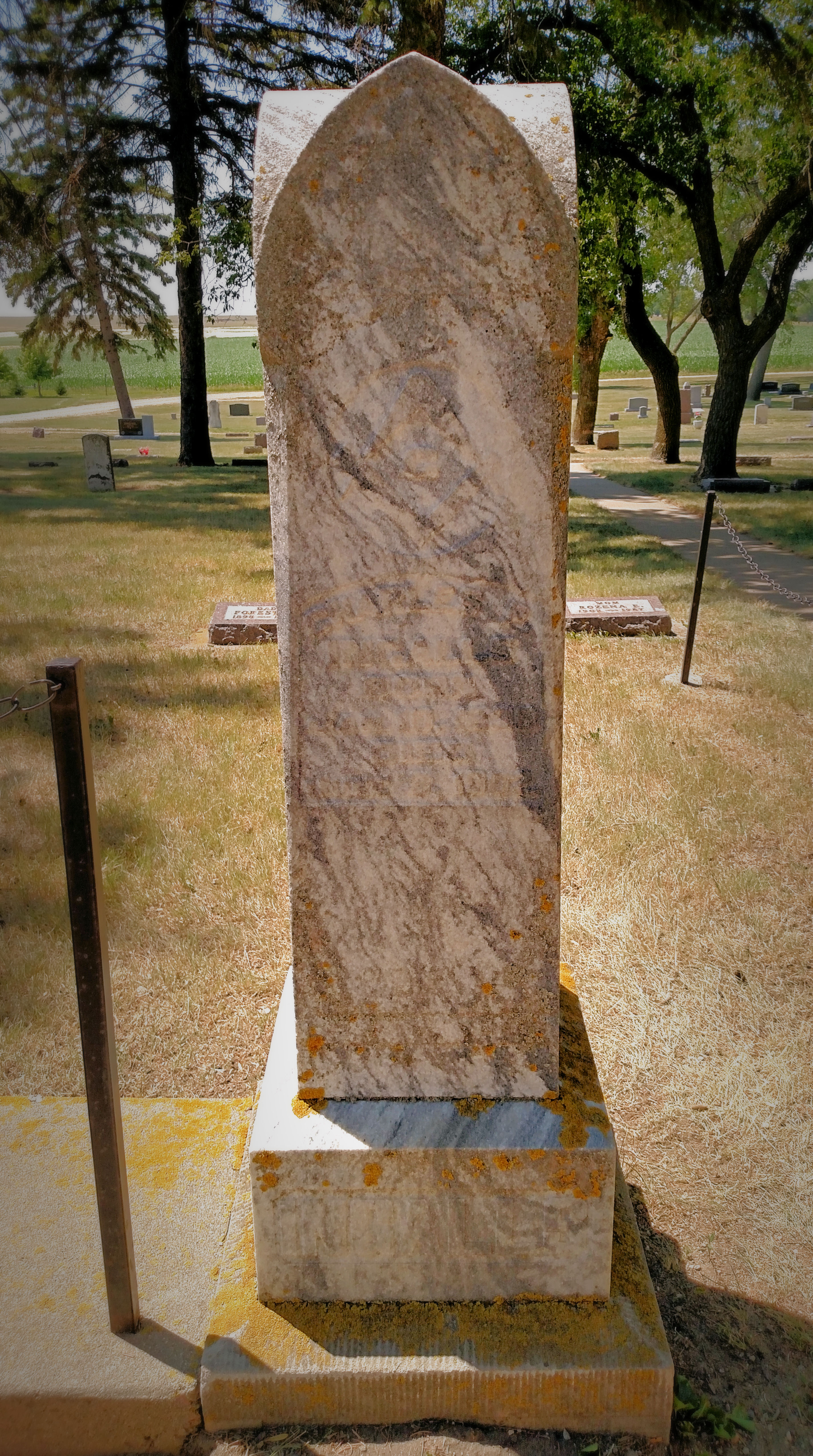
Charles Ingalls gravesite, De Smet Cemetery, South Dakota

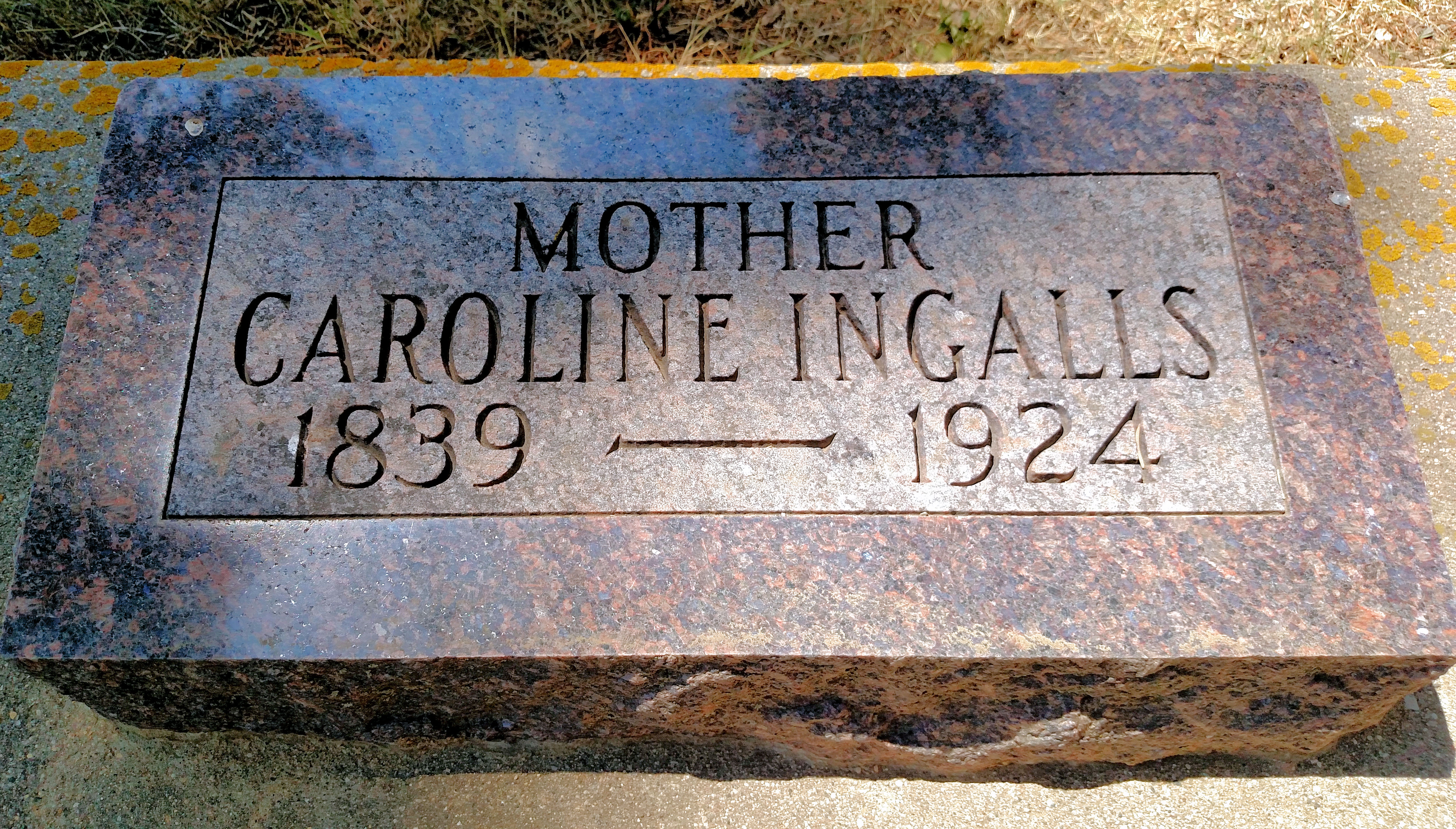
Caroline Ingalls gravesite, De Smet Cemetery, South Dakota

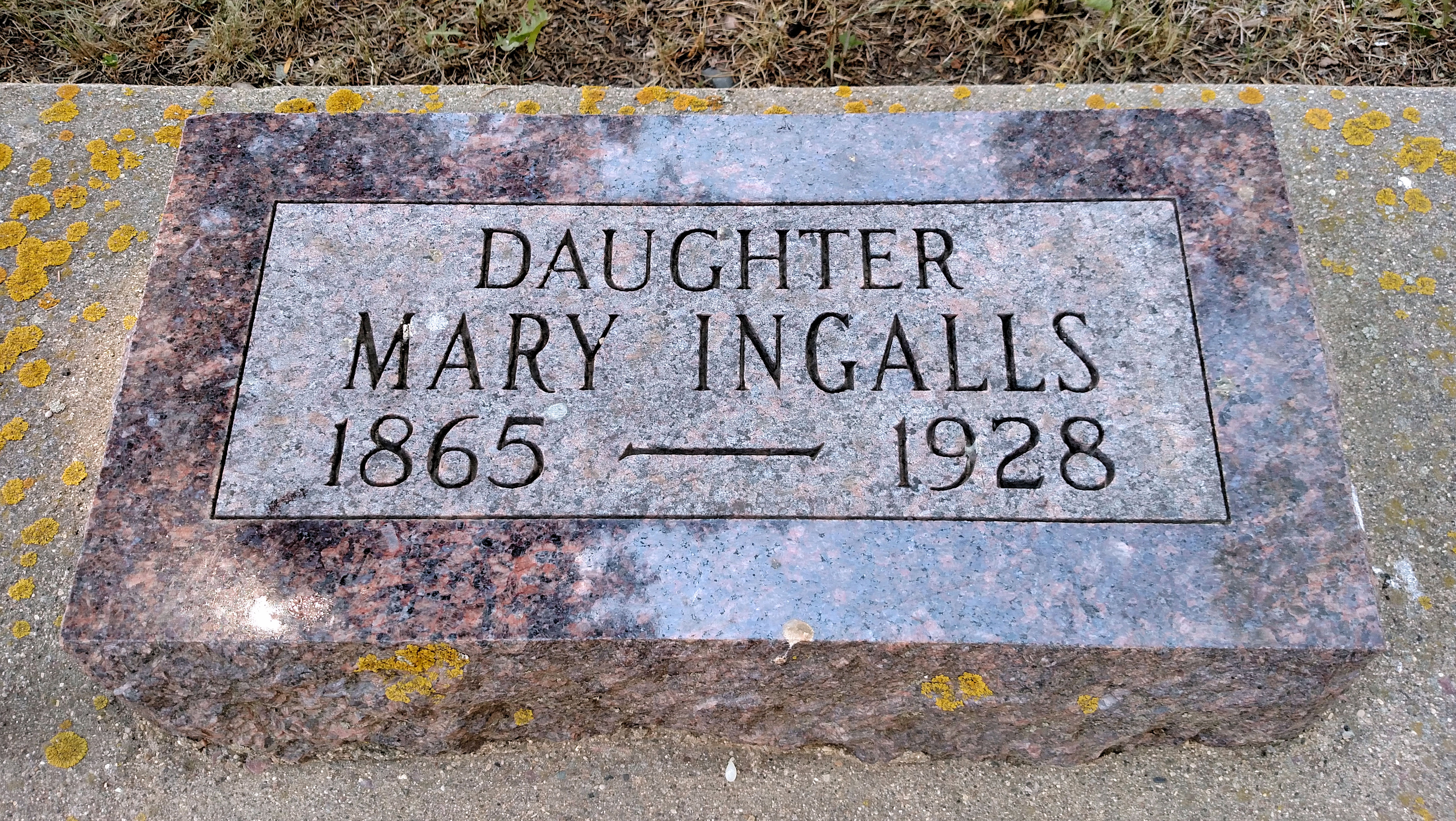
Mary Ingalls gravesite, De Smet Cemetery, South Dakota

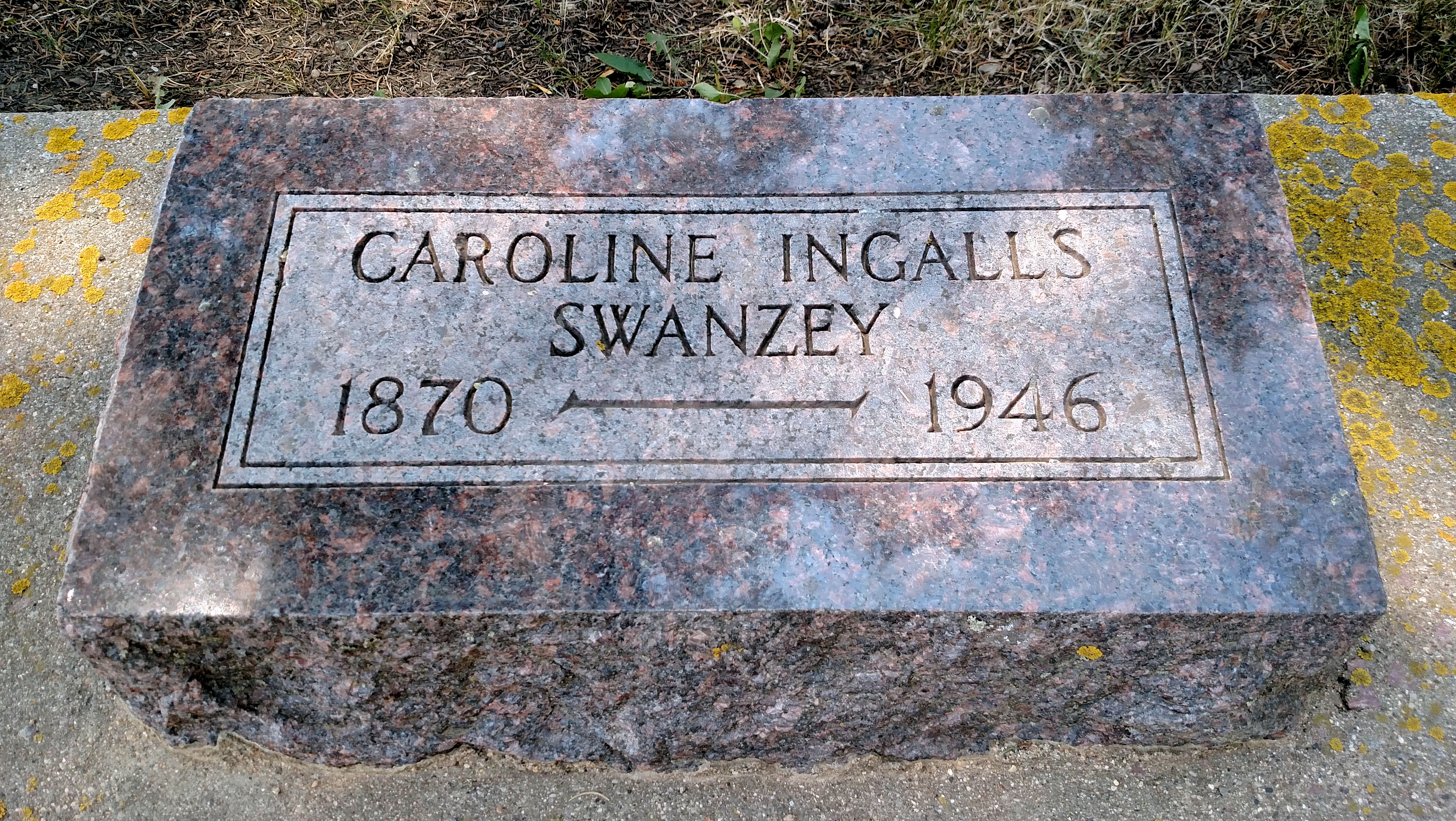
Carrie Ingalls Swanzey gravesite, De Smet Cemetery, South Dakota

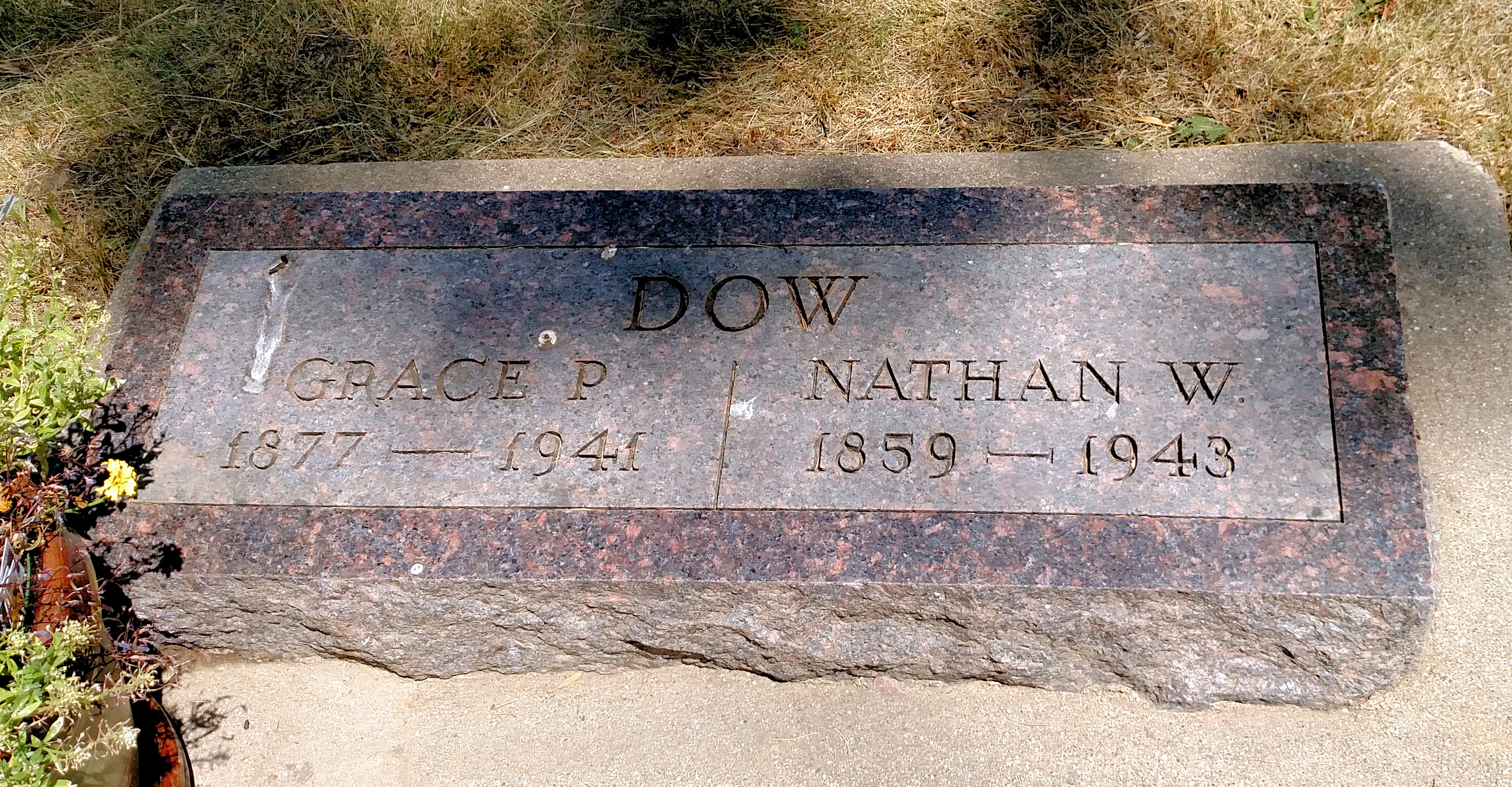
Grace Ingalls Dow and Nathan Dow gravesite, De Smet Cemetery, South Dakota

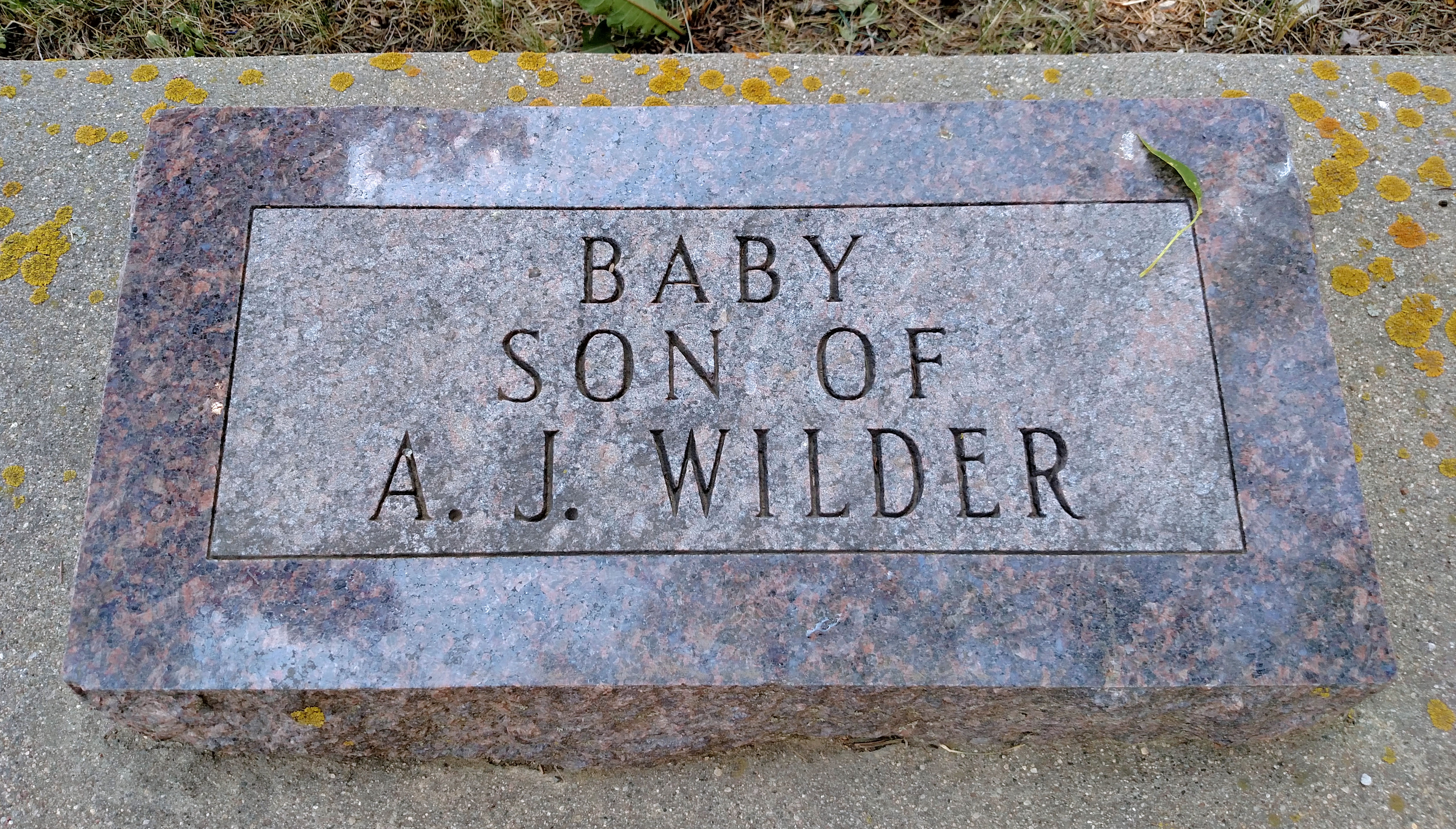
Baby Boy Wilder gravesite, De Smet Cemetery, South Dakota

== See also ==
- Ingalls House (De Smet, South Dakota)
