= Laura, the Prairie Girl =

Japanese anime television series

- Little Laura and her family
- 草原の少女ローラ
- Genre: Historical drama, Old West
- Based on: Little House on the Prairie by Laura Ingalls Wilder
- Written by: Iwao Yamazaki
- Directed by: Seiji Endō; Mitsuo Ezaki
- Music by: Akihiko Takashima
- Country of origin: Japan
- Original language: Japanese
- No. of episodes: 26

Production
- Executive producer: Koichi Motohashi
- Producers: Junzo Nakajima; Masashi Takaduma (TBS); Hiroshi Inoue (TBS)
- Production companies: Nippon Animation; TBS

Original release
- Network: JNN (TBS)
- Release: 7 October 1975 – 3 April 1976

Laura, the Prairie Girl (草原の少女ローラ, Sōgen no Shōjo Rōra) is a Japanese anime television series based on the novels Little House in the Big Woods and Little House on the Prairie by Laura Ingalls Wilder. Twenty-six half-hour episodes were released between 1975 and 1976.

== Plot ==
The Ingalls family is a close-knit group: father, mother, and three daughters. Among them, Laura, the middle child, is the focus of this show. This show adapts the 1st and 3rd books of the Little House on the Prairie book series. As such, the show goes from living in the woodlands to moving to the prairie lands to survive due to a lack of livelihood. In search for a fresh start, the family is determined to go through any form of obstacles.

== Characters ==
Laura Ingalls
The protagonist of the series. Voiced by: Kazuko Sugiyama
Charles Ingalls
Laura's father. Voiced by: Shūsei Nakamura
Caroline Ingalls
Laura's mother. Voiced by: Eiko Masuyama
Mary Ingalls
Laura's older sister. Voiced by: Masako Sugaya
Carrie Ingalls
Laura's younger sister. Voiced by: Yoneko Matsukane
Mr. Edwards
Voiced by: Masaaki Okabe

== Staff ==
- Directors: Seiji Endō and Mitsuo Ezaki
- Writer: Masao Maruyama
- Executive producer: Kōichi Motohashi
- Music: Akihiko Takashima
- Director of photography: Keishichi Kuroki
- Art director: Masahiro Ioka
- Character designer: Yasuji Mori
- Animation director: Yasuji Mori

== Season 1 ==
1. "Little house in a big forest" (October 7, 1975): Laura kills a vicious snake threatening a pregnant mare in her family's stable with her dog Jack and awesome throwing skills.
2. "A wolf cub arrives" (October 14, 1975): Laura adopts a wolf pup while out bathing the horses. The family won't let her keep it, so she has to return it to its pack.
3. "Everyone's treasure" (October 21, 1975): After doing much mischief, Laura breaks her hand, so her father rushes her to the doctor's chamber. But the nearby river is overflowing after a 5-day rain streak. So, her father puts Laura on his head and crosses with a rope attached to a tree on the other bank of the river. Even though the resulting crossing breaks his two ribs, he still manages to take Laura to the doctor's, as to him his whole family is his treasure.
4. "The boy in the covered wagon" (October 28, 1975): Laura saves a boy named John and his wagon family when their wagon got stuck in a river mud hole. Later that boy comes to give some firewood with his pet piglet. The wagon family is later invited, as they are the first neighbours to the Ingels nearby. John's father tells the others that his mom died in a fire while saving the piglets. The following day, when the dog Jack unintentionally lights a fire in the stable, it is John who comes forward bravely to save the horses.
5. "New house across the forest" (November 4, 1975): The Ingels have left to make a wooden house for John's family. During that time, John develops a familial fondness for Laura's mom, as his own mom died some time ago.
6. "Bear cub we met at the waterfall" (November 11, 1975): Feeling left out carrie, little sister to Laura, goes to the nearby waterfall where a mama bear and its cub are eating the fish Laura's father was supposed to bring home for his family. Laura finds out, and the news gets to his father. He brings the whole cavalry only to see Lil' Carrie sleeping with the bear cub. To distract the mama bear away from Carrie, they drop a honey block near her. It does the trick, and Carrie is returned to his mama's bosom.
7. "My hero the cowboy" (November 18, 1975): John's brother Freddy wants to take part in a cowboy competition, where they wrangle bulls, throw horseshoes, and whip. But a prerequisite is an ox, which they don't have. But because Freddy did save Laura earlier that day from falling off a cliff, Laura's father buys an ox for him, so he can enter and win that competition.
8. "A fawn is calling" (November 25, 1975)
9. "Bullets made by dad" (December 5, 1975): Laura's father Charles has made some bullets to kill a mountain lion, which has been hunting people. But one of the bullets needed to kill the lion has been taken by Laura as she finds them shiny. But with the lack of that one bullet, Laura's father comes this close to dying from the attack of the lion. Thankfully, he was able to avert it and forgive Laura after she tearfully admitted to the fault.
10. "Bearded guest" (December 12, 1975): Laura has brought back a homeless helping-hand from the forested area with a huge beard. He's really jolly and likes playing a lot. But he does finish his work on time and leaves Laura's home the very next day. Laura made sure to lend him a horse and a deer-skin shawl. The bearded person does the horse, along which gives laura wooden doll and a letter thanking the family for the lodging and food.
11. "Lost migrating bird" (December 19, 1975): Laura takes care of an injured migratory bird only for it to be hunted by Freddy. Her father makes her understand that humans need to hunt things for food here, so not getting attached to animals might not be a good idea.
12. "Where did Santa Claus go?" (December 26, 1975): It is Christmas Day for the Ingels. Usually Pa appears as Santa to give his daughters gifts, but he is busy grabbing a doctor for a guy with a pregnant wife, and ma is also taking care of the pregnant woman. The doctor comes just for the delivery of the baby, which turns out to be a girl. The father is grateful to the whole family, so he wastes no time to appear as Santa to the girls and gives them gifts for their help in the delivery.
13. "Pa disappears in a snowstorm" (January 2, 1976): After making a sled, Pa goes out in a snowstorm to get supplies for the family. While coming back, his horse tears away from the sled's bondage, and then he has to hunker down in a makeshift ice cave. Come the next day, he is able to unite with his family, ending their worries.
14. "Dreams and hope! Departing for the prairies" (January 9, 1976): With many people coming and going around their house and livelihood drying out, Laura's father has decided finally to leave for the prairies. It will be a 100-day journey, and they will not be able to take Bernie, the colt, with them. This saddens the initially upbeat Laura. But she steels her heart and readies herself for the journey.
15. "Big adventure! Crossing the frozen lake" (January 16, 1976): The journey has started for the family. They first cross the frozen Mississippi River, just in time before a winter storm. Their wagon does get stuck in a mud-hole, so they fortunately find shelter in a nearby abandoned shack. Come tomorrow morning, they cross another river, this time with a rope-pulled, pulley-driven ferry. Following that, they finally leave the forested area.
16. "Jack the dog disappears" (January 23, 1976): The family has started to enter the prairie lands. After trekking down a treacherous path down a cliff, they have to cross a flowing river. Following that, the family finds out that Jack could not pass the river with them and probably has been carried away by the stream. Charles, Laura's father, has decided that they are going to continue on their way if the dog doesn't come back by tomorrow.
17. "Come back, Jack, my dear dog!" (January 30, 1976): After an entire day being dejected, a forlorn Laura finally sees her dog as they are just putting camp down for the first time in the prairies.
18. "Cute animals of the big prairies" (February 6, 1976): Laura & the family find the new prairie place full of materials to build a new home, plenty of game & fish. Moreover, a helping hand to build a house.
19. "Build it quickly! Our new house" (February 13, 1976): With the help of Edward's, the bare bones of Laura's new home is made.
20. "A wolf pack surrounds the house" (February 20, 1976): The roofs have not been finished yet, but at that time, a pack of wolves decide to pass through Laura's homestead. Laura's father holds his rifle tightly to his chest, while also holding Laura. Thankfully, the wolves were just passing through and did not pose much harm.
21. "New house built with Pa" (February 27, 1976): The roof & the chimney have finally been completed. About time though, as pa is completely exhausted after doing all this work by his lonesome.
22. "A cute calf has arrived!" (March 6, 1976): Laura's father has taken a job in cattle wrangling and, as payment, gotten a cow with its calf.
23. "Perilous well-digging" (March 13, 1976): Assisted by a neighbourly hand, Charles Ingles finishes the haphazard work of digging down a well for the family.
24. "Something terrible happened!" (March 20, 1976): The whole family gets malaria. They pass the most miserable 1&1/2 days. Had it not been for Jack the dog, finding the doctor, they would not have lasted the night.
25. "My house is burning!!" (March 27, 1976): The house catches on fire when pa was away, but Laura and ma are able to put it out.
26. "Wheat, grow tall!" (April 3, 1976): It is time for plowing. After days of plowing by both pa and ma, all they have now is to wait for rain, which does come; paving the way for a good harvest.
