= Grace Ingalls =

Sister of Laura Ingalls Wilder (1877–1941)

Grace Pearl Ingalls Dow
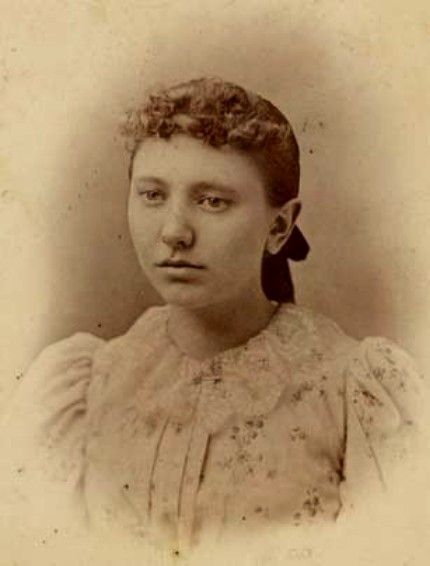
- Grace Ingalls, age 16
- Born: May 23, 1877; Burr Oak, Iowa, U.S.
- Died: November 10, 1941 (aged 64); Manchester, South Dakota, U.S.
- Resting place: De Smet Cemetery
- Spouse: Nathan William Dow (m. 1901)
- Parents: Charles Phillip Ingalls (father); Caroline Lake Quiner (mother)
- Relatives: Mary Ingalls (sister); Laura Ingalls Wilder (sister); Carrie Ingalls (sister); Freddie Ingalls (brother); Rose Wilder Lane (niece); Almanzo Wilder (brother-in-law)

Grace Pearl Ingalls Dow (/ˈɪŋɡəlz ˈdaʊ/; May 23, 1877 – November 10, 1941) was the fifth and last child of Caroline and Charles Ingalls. She was the youngest sister of Laura Ingalls Wilder, known for her Little House on the Prairie books.

== Biography ==
Following her own public school education, Grace Ingalls studied to become a schoolteacher. When her training was finished, Ingalls taught in the nearby town of Manchester, South Dakota, seven miles west of De Smet, South Dakota, where her family settled.

On October 16, 1901, she married Nathan William Dow in the parlor of her parents' home in De Smet. Besides being a farm wife, Grace dabbled in journalism like her older sister Carrie, acting as a stringer for several local newspapers later in her life. Grace and Carrie cared for their eldest sister, Mary, who was blind, after their parents died.

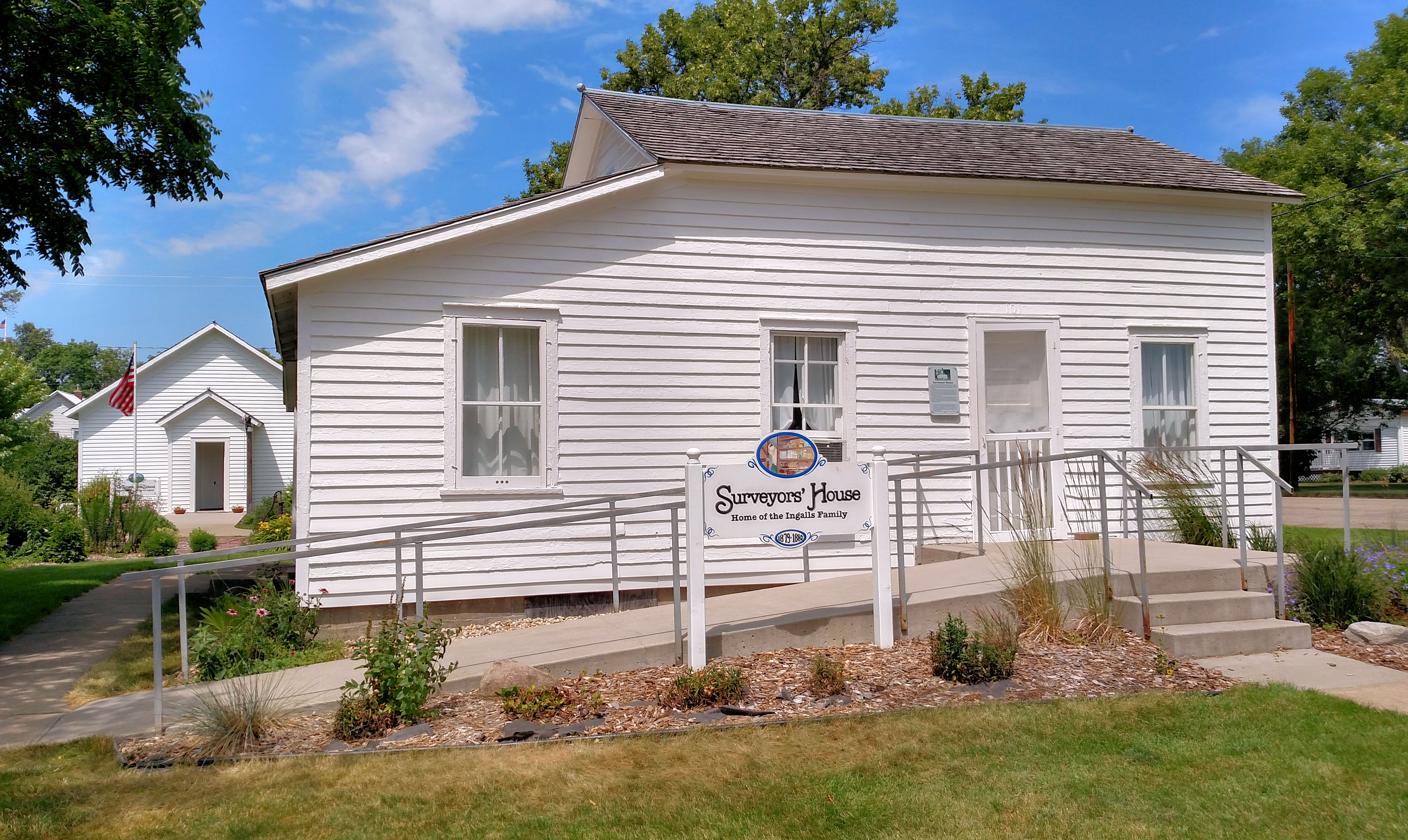
Surveyors' House, first home in Dakota Territory of the Charles Ingalls family

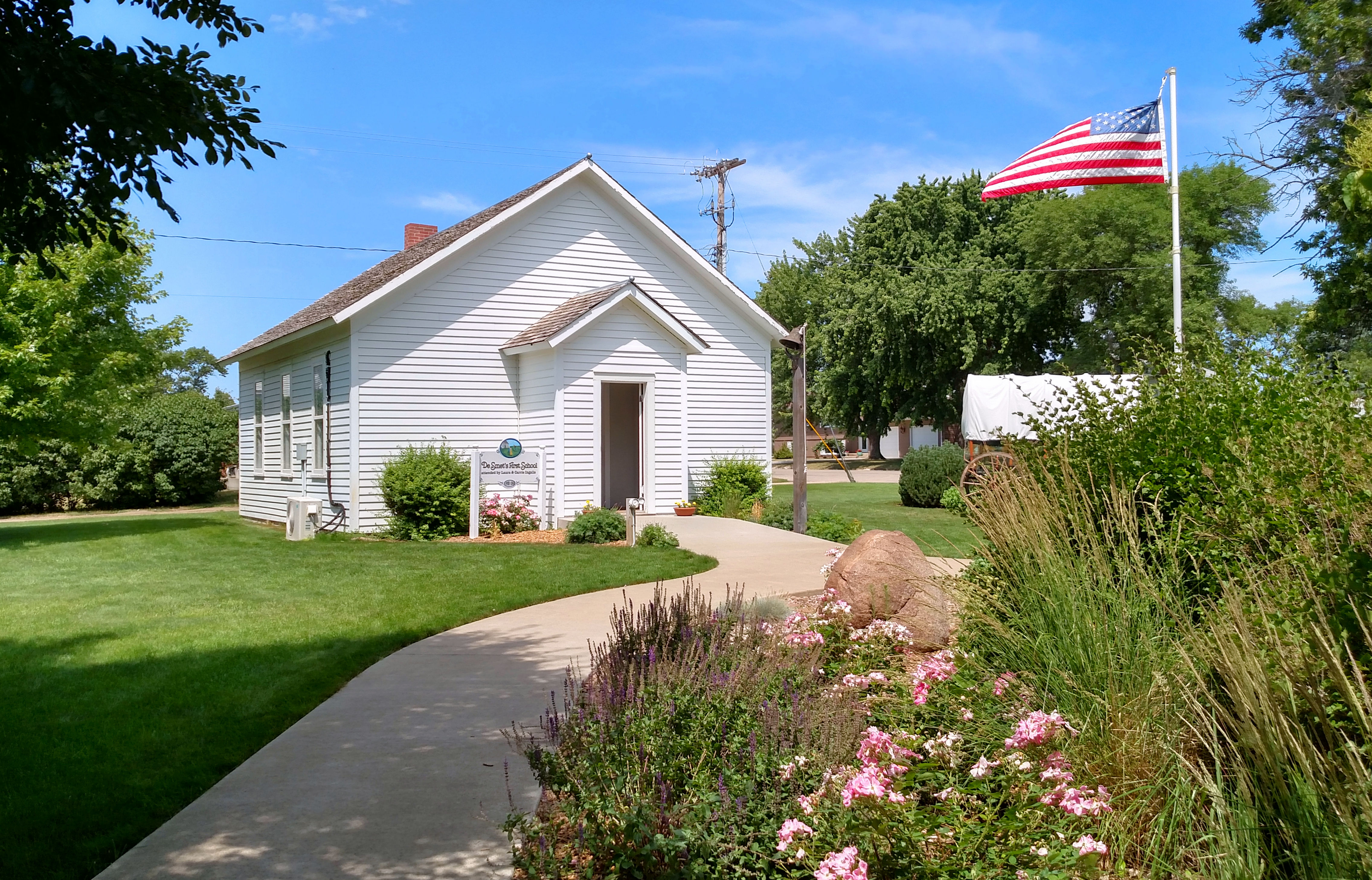
De Smet School, first school in De Smet and attended by Grace Ingalls as well as her older sisters Carrie and Laura

Grace died of complications from diabetes in Manchester, South Dakota, on November 10, 1941, at age 64. Diabetes ran in the Ingalls family and Laura, Carrie, and Grace all died from the complications of the disease, with Dow being the first Ingalls sibling to succumb. She is buried near the Ingalls family plot at De Smet Cemetery in De Smet, South Dakota; her husband is buried next to her. The couple had no children.

== In the media ==
Dow was portrayed in the television adaptations of Little House on the Prairie by:

- Uncredited children at first and then twins Wendi and Brenda Turnbaugh in the television series Little House on the Prairie
- Courtnie Bull and Lyndee Probst in Beyond the Prairie: The True Story of Laura Ingalls Wilder.
