= Little House on the Prairie (2005 TV series) =

- Also known as: Laura Ingalls Wilder's; Little House on the Prairie
- Based on: Little House on the Prairie by Laura Ingalls Wilder
- Screenplay by: Katie Ford
- Directed by: David L. Cunningham
- Starring: Cameron Bancroft; Erin Cottrell; Kyle Chavarria; Danielle Chuchran; Gregory Sporleder
- Theme music composer: John Cameron
- Country of origin: United States
- Original language: English
- No. of episodes: 6

Production
- Producer: Hans Proppe
- Running time: 255 minutes
- Production companies: Ed Friendly Productions; Voice Pictures; Touchstone Television

Original release
- Network: ABC
- Release: March 26 – April 23, 2005

Little House on the Prairie is a 2005 American Western television miniseries directed by David L. Cunningham. It is a six-part adaptation of children's novels Little House in the Big Woods (1932) and Little House on the Prairie (1935) by Laura Ingalls Wilder. It was broadcast on ABC from March 26 to April 23, 2005, as part of The Wonderful World of Disney anthology series.

== Cast ==
- Cameron Bancroft as Charles Ingalls
- Erin Cottrell as Caroline Ingalls
- Kyle Chavarria as Laura Ingalls
- Danielle Chuchran as Mary Ingalls
- Gregory Sporleder as Mr. Edwards
- Nathaniel Arcand as Kiowa Brave
- Allen Belcourt as Young Kiowa Warrior
- Byron Chief-Moon as Soldat Du Chene
- Melanie Corcoran as Independence prostitute
- James Cosmo as Mr. Scott
- Geoffrey Ewert as Townsman
- Richard Halliday as Shopkeeper
- Dorian Harewood as Dr. Tan
- Jimmy Herman as Osage
- Daniel Jeffery as Boy
- Tim Koetting as Major Callaghan
- Barbara Kozicki as Aunt Docie
- Griffin Powell-Arcand as Young Indian Boy
- Sammy Simon as Medicine-man
- Royal Sproule as Post employee
- Gina Stockdale as Mrs. Scott

== Episodes ==
No.	Title	Directed by	Written by	Original release date	Prod. code
1	"Little House in the Big Woods"	David L. Cunningham	Katie Ford	March 26, 2005	101
2	"Little House in the Big Woods"	David L. Cunningham	Katie Ford	April 2, 2005	102
Charles Ingalls leads his family on their journey from Wisconsin to claim land in Kansas. They encounter difficulty crossing a lake, the kids get bored, and Caroline Ingalls starts to doubt their move. The family dog is nearly killed when crossing a dangerous river, but the family arrives safely in Kansas. They build their house with the help of their new neighbor, Mr. Edwards, and encounter wolves and Indians.
3	"The Ingalls' Journey"	David L. Cunningham	Katie Ford	April 2, 2005	104
4	"The Ingalls' Journey"	David L. Cunningham	Katie Ford	April 9, 2005	103
Indians visit the house while Charles is out hunting, unnerving the women. The family meet their neighbors Mr. and Mrs. Scott. The family falls sick with malaria. Charles and Laura work for local cowboys in exchange for meat. Indians again unexpectely visit the Ingalls' home. Flooding prevents Charles from getting Christmas dinner and presents, but Mr. Edwards manages to save Christmas.
5	"Adventures on the Kansas Prairie"	David L. Cunningham	Katie Ford	April 16, 2005	105
6	"Adventures on the Kansas Prairie"	David L. Cunningham	Katie Ford	April 23, 2005	106
Charles fights a mountain lion. A fire breaks out on the Ingalls' farm, which they suspect was set by the Indians. Mr. Edwards' house was also destroyed, so the family stays with the Scotts after reinforcing their house. The Indians move off the land after negotiations with the government, and the Ingalls family explores their camp. Soldiers arrive to evict those illegally homesteading on the land, and Charles is unable to negotiate for them to stay. The family packs up and prepares to move to Minnesota.

== Release ==
=== Home media ===
The miniseries was released on DVD on March 28, 2006.

== Reception ==
An uncredited review in the Province stated that "This type of family drama is as quaint and rare now as a log cabin, but children will enjoy the miniseries a lot and parents will like watching it with them." Allesandra Stanley of the New York Times thought that the miniseries was more faithful to Wilder's books than was the 1970s and 1980s TV series.
