= Beyond the Prairie: The True Story of Laura Ingalls Wilder =

- Written by: Stephen Harrigan
- Directed by: Marcus Cole
- Starring: Richard Thomas; Lindsay Crouse; Meredith Monroe; Barbara Jane Reams; Haley McCormick; Walton Goggins; Skye McCole Bartusiak; Tess Harper
- Theme music composer: Ernest Troost
- Country of origin: United States
- Original language: English

Production
- Producers: Robert M. Rolsky; Stephen Harrigan (part 2)
- Running time: 200 minutes (approx.)
- Production companies: CBS Productions; Columbia TriStar Television

Original release
- Network: CBS
- Release: January 2, 2000 – March 17, 2002

Beyond the Prairie: The True Story of Laura Ingalls Wilder and its sequel Beyond the Prairie II: The True Story of Laura Ingalls Wilder Continues, are television films shown in two parts, which presented episodes from Laura Ingalls Wilder's later books in the Little House on the Prairie series (from The Long Winter to The First Four Years).

The first film was shot in 1999 and aired on CBS on January 2, 2000. The second was filmed between March–April 2001 in Texas, and was initially scheduled to air on CBS on Sunday, November 4, 2001, but was postponed when CBS instead broadcast the Emmys. It was rescheduled to air on CBS on March 17, 2002.

== Cast ==
- Richard Thomas as Charles Ingalls
- Lindsay Crouse as Caroline Ingalls
- Meredith Monroe as Laura Ingalls
- Barbara Jane Reams as Mary Ingalls
- Haley McCormick as Carrie Ingalls
- Walton Goggins as Almanzo Wilder
- Skye McCole Bartusiak as Rose Wilder
- Tess Harper as Older Laura Ingalls Wilder/Narrator
- Cody Linley as Charlie Magnuson

== Awards ==
- 2000 Emmy Nomination, Outstanding Music Composition for a Miniseries, Movie or a Special (Ernest Troost)
