= Charles Ingalls =

Father of Laura Ingalls Wilder

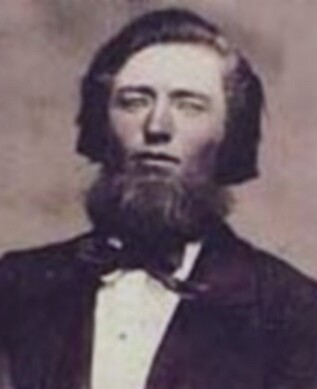
- Born: May 21, 1836; Cuba, New York, U.S.
- Died: June 8, 1902 (aged 66); De Smet, South Dakota, U.S.
- Resting place: De Smet Cemetery, De Smet, Kingsbury County, South Dakota, U.S.
- Spouse: Caroline Lake Quiner (m. 1860)
- Children: Mary Amelia Ingalls; Laura Elizabeth Ingalls Wilder; Caroline Celestia "Carrie" Ingalls Swanzey; Charles Frederick "Freddie" Ingalls; Grace Pearl Ingalls Dow

Charles Phillip Ingalls (/ˈɪŋɡəlz/; January 10, 1836 – June 8, 1902) was an American pioneer, farmer, government official, and carpenter who was the father of Laura Ingalls Wilder, known for her Little House series of books. He is depicted as the character "Pa" in the books and the television series.

== Early life and family ==
Charles Ingalls was born in Cuba, New York, the third of nine children of Lansford Whiting and Laura Louise (née Colby) Ingalls. Ingalls' parents appear as "Grandpa" and "Grandma" in the Laura Ingalls Wilder book Little House in the Big Woods.

Ingalls' father was born in Dunham, Missisquoi County, Lower Canada (now Dunham, Quebec, Canada), a descendant of Henry Ingalls, who was born in Skirbeck, Lincolnshire, England, and settled in the Massachusetts Bay Colony. His mother was born in Vermont and was a descendant of Edmund Rice, an early immigrant to Massachusetts Bay Colony. Ingalls' paternal grandmother was Margaret Delano, a descendant of Mayflower passenger Richard Warren as well as from the Delano family of New York and ancestors of U.S. President Franklin Delano Roosevelt. In the 1840s, when Ingalls was a young boy, his family moved from New York to the tallgrass prairie of Campton Township, just west of Elgin, Illinois.

Ingalls grew into an accomplished hunter-trapper, carpenter, and farmer. He had a love of music and reading, and played the violin.

On February 1, 1860, Ingalls married a neighbor, the quiet and proper Caroline Lake Quiner. Together, they had five children: Mary Amelia (1865–1928), Laura Elizabeth (1867–1957), Caroline Celestia (Carrie) (1870–1946), Charles Frederick (Freddie) (1875–1876) and Grace Pearl (1877–1941)

He and his older brother did not serve in the Civil War.

== Family travels and settling ==
=== Wisconsin to points west ===
For his entire life, Ingalls had a strong case of "wanderlust". He is quoted by his daughter, Laura Ingalls Wilder, in her Little House series of books as saying: "My wandering foot gets to itching". From their original home in the woods of Wisconsin, Ingalls moved his family to southeastern Kansas, then back to Wisconsin; and from there to southern Minnesota. They then went to Burr Oak, Iowa and then back to Minnesota. Presented with an opportunity to work for a railroad in Dakota Territory, he longed to move yet again, as the family was struggling financially in Minnesota. Ingalls moved to Dakota Territory in 1879, took a job with the Chicago and North Western Railroad, and filed for a homestead in Brookings, Dakota Territory, on February 19, 1880.

=== De Smet, final home ===
After promising his wife, Caroline, that the family would finally settle in one place, it was in 1879 that Ingalls decided to stay in De Smet, Dakota Territory following their move from Minnesota. The first winter after arriving in De Smet, the family lived in what was known as the surveyor's house. Following the first winter, Ingalls decided to try farming in the area of Silver Lake, outside town. A few years later, he had "proved up" his claim and sold the farm, choosing to move back into De Smet and build a home on Third Street. Construction on the house began in 1887 and was completed in 1889. It was in this house that Ingalls, along with his wife and daughter Mary, lived out the rest of his days. In 1880, Ingalls opened a general goods store. The business closed in 1881. A respected citizen of De Smet, Ingalls held various elected positions in the town, including Justice of the Peace and deputy sheriff.

Ingalls helped found, build, and was an active member of the First Congregational Church in De Smet. The first service was held in the new church building on August 30, 1882. Ingalls and his wife, along with oldest daughter Mary, were among the church's eight original charter members.

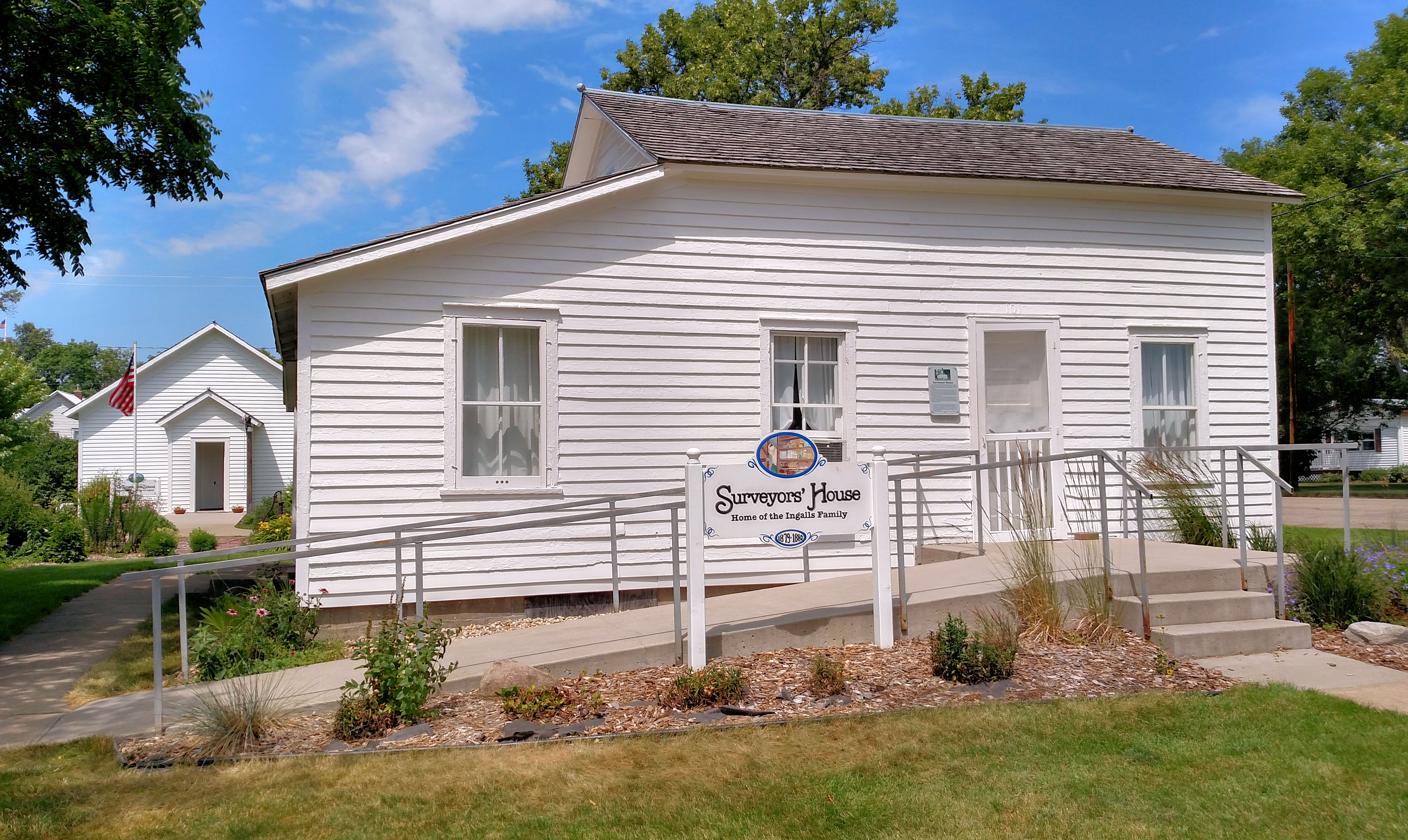
Surveyors' House, first home in Dakota Territory of the Charles Ingalls family

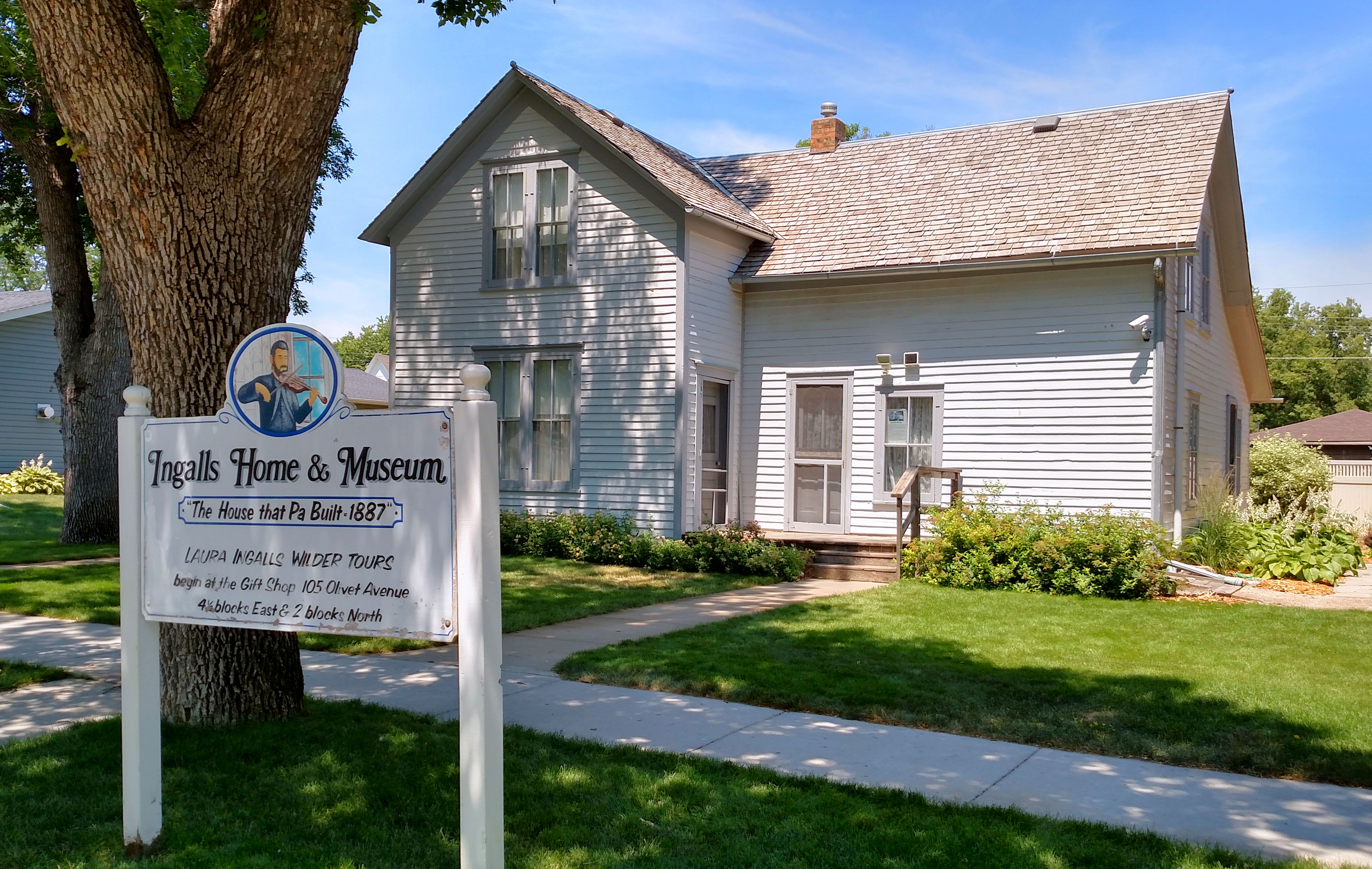
"The House That Pa Built", located at 210 3rd Street SW in De Smet

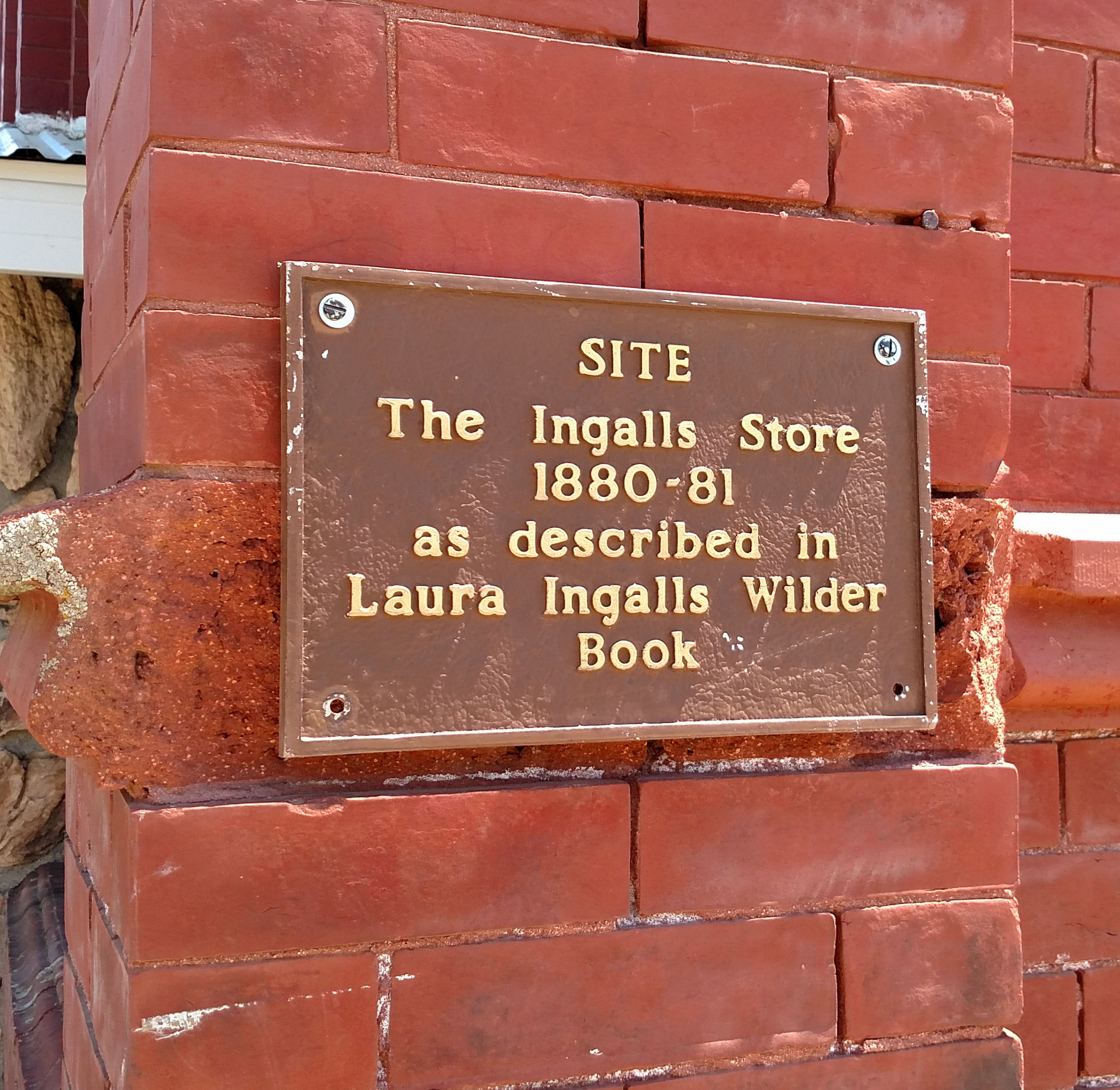
Former site of Ingalls Store, downtown De Smet

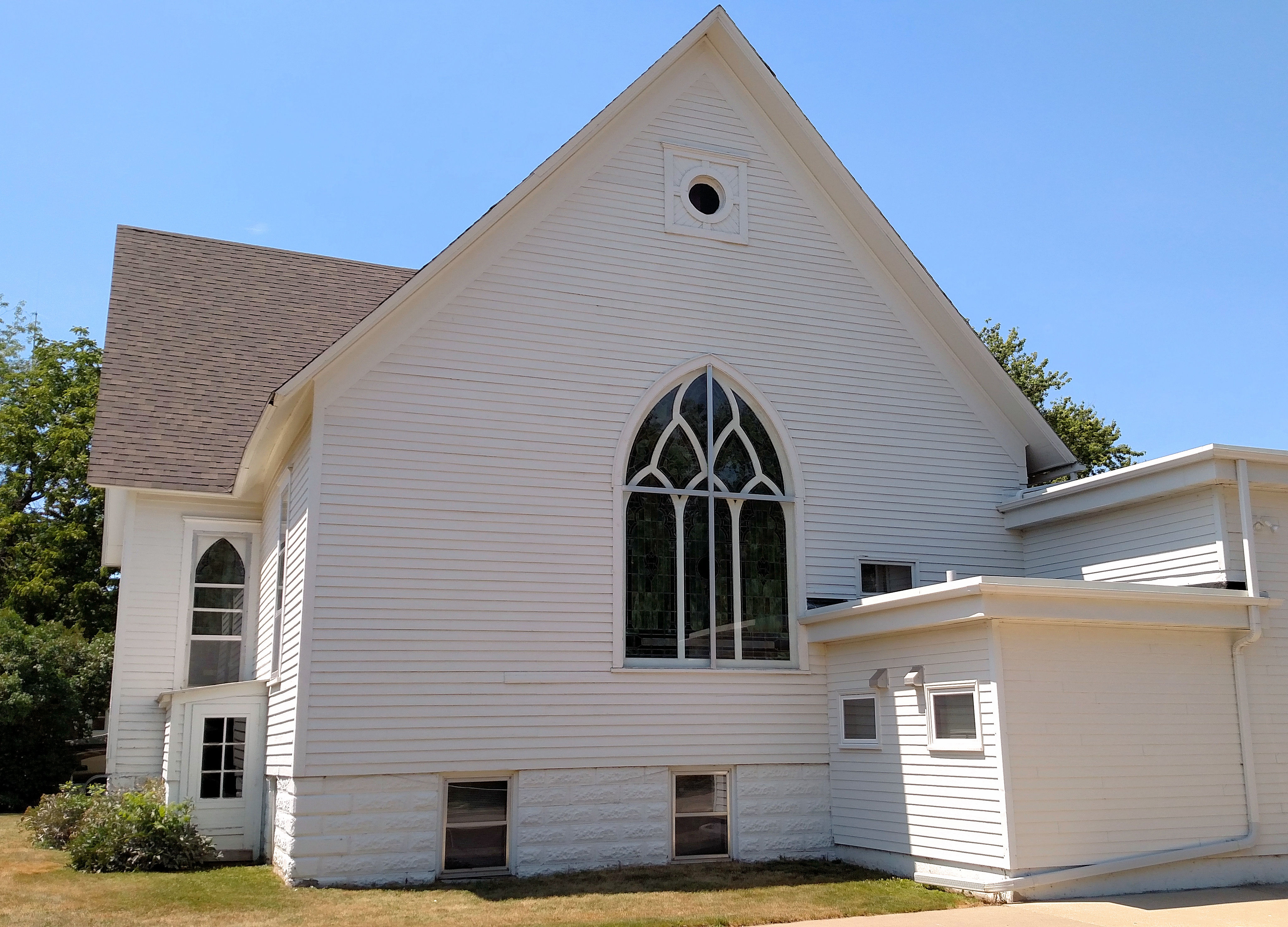
Currently a Christian and Missionary Alliance church, the building was originally the First Congregational Church of De Smet

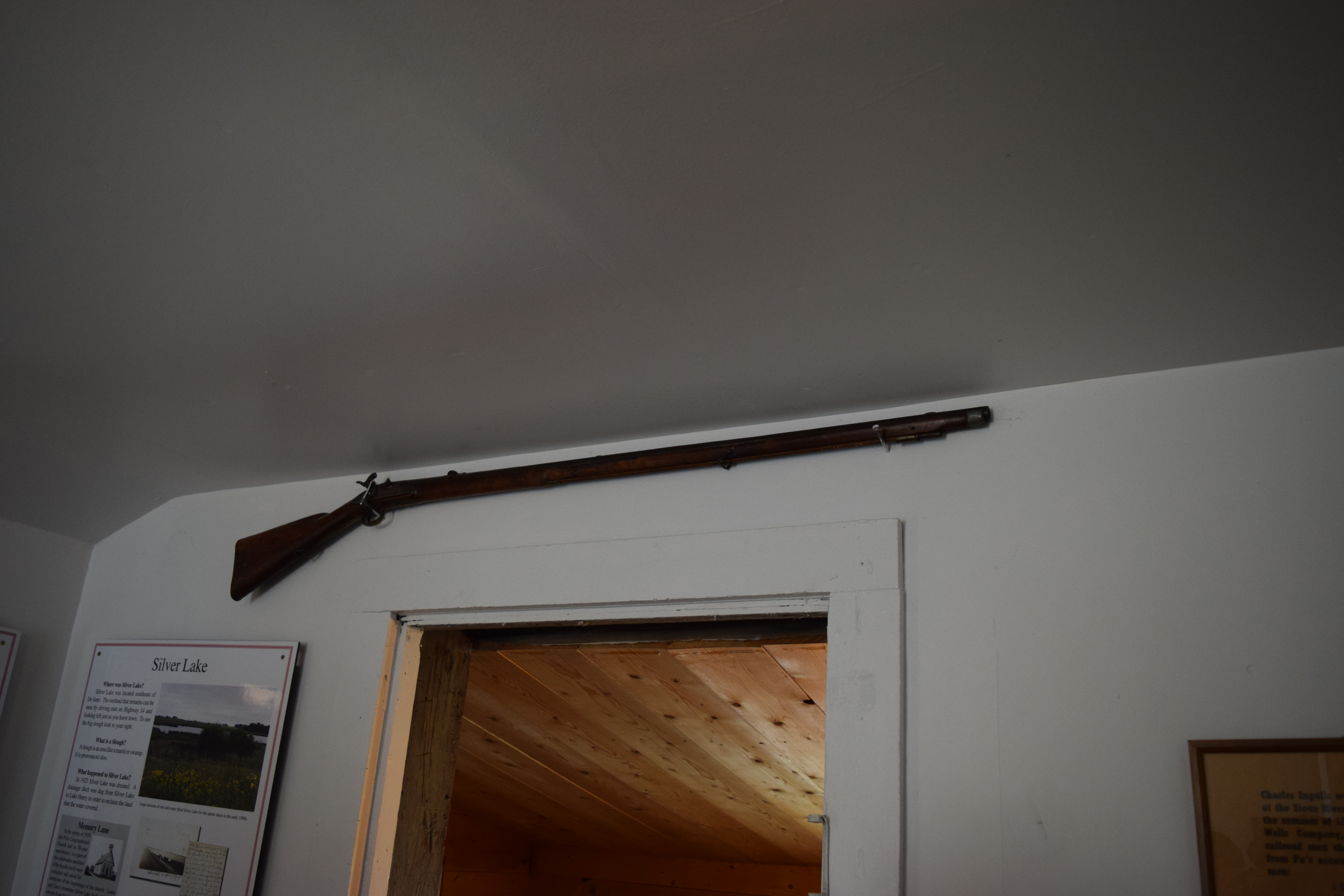
Pa's gun hangs over the door of the De Smet house.

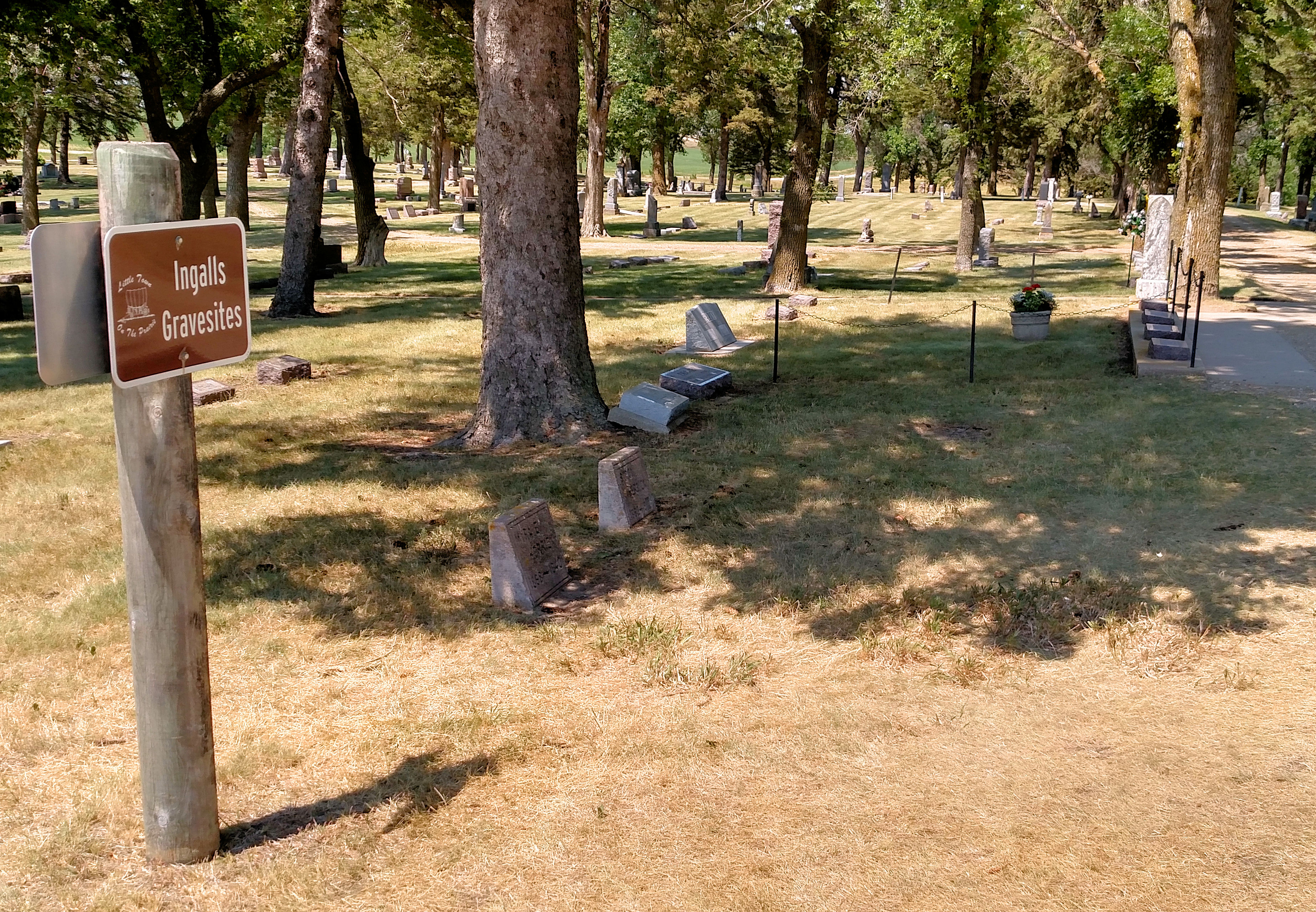
Ingalls family plot, De Smet Cemetery, South Dakota

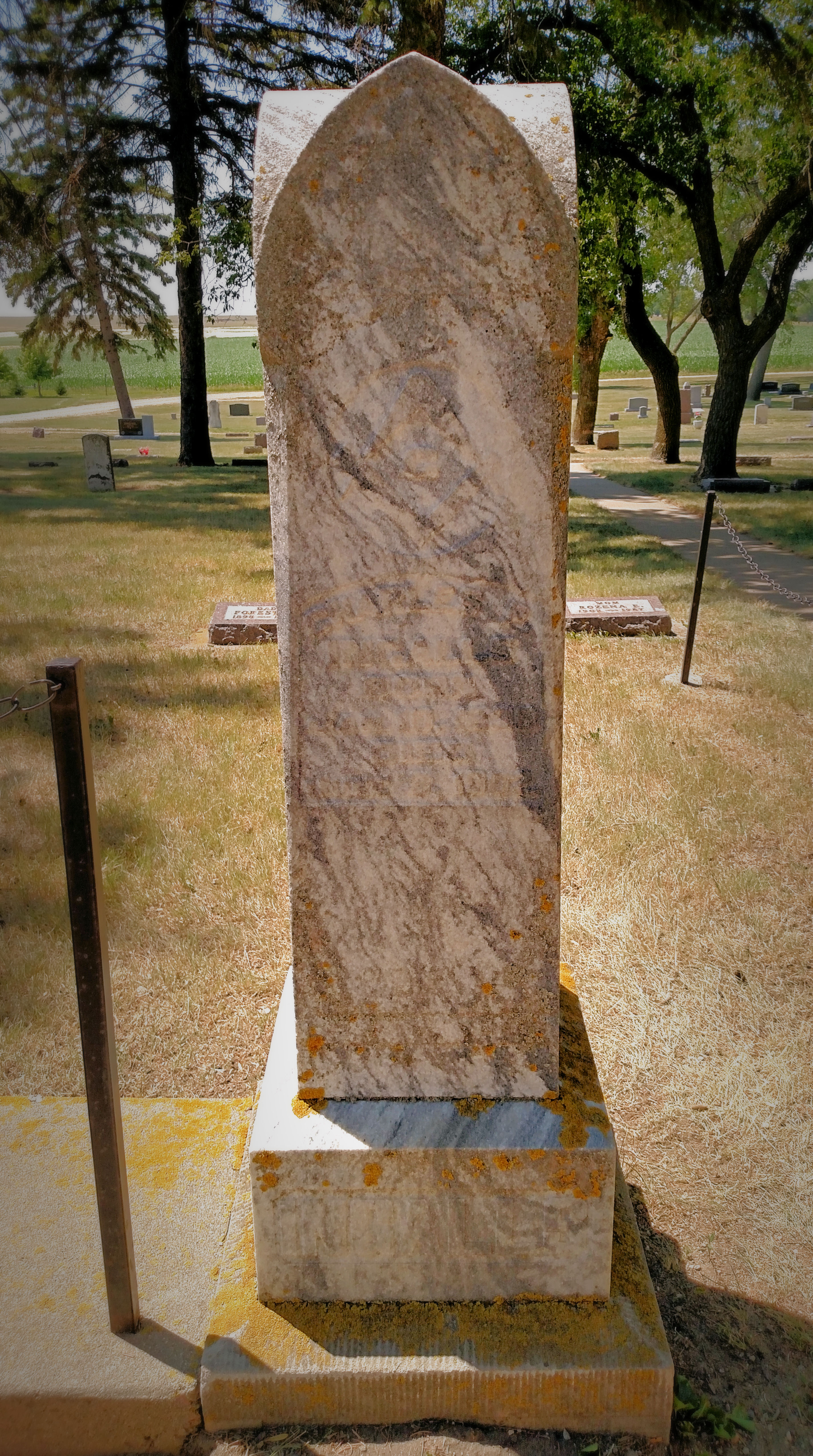
Charles Ingalls gravesite, De Smet Cemetery, South Dakota

=== Death ===
Ingalls died on June 8, 1902, of cardiovascular disease, at the age of 66. A Freemason, Ingalls was given Masonic rites at his funeral. He is buried at De Smet Cemetery alongside his wife, Caroline, his daughters Mary, Carrie, and Grace, as well as his infant grandson who died at 3 weeks old, the child of daughter Laura and son-in-law Almanzo Wilder.

== In the media ==
Ingalls has been portrayed in the adaptations of Little House on the Prairie by:

- Michael Landon in the television series Little House on the Prairie and its movie sequels
- Matthew Laborteaux as a young Charles in the third-season episode "Journey in the Spring" and the fourth-season episode "I Remember, I Remember" of the television series
- Shūsei Nakamura (voice) in Laura, The Prairie Girl Japanese cartoon series
- Richard Thomas in both Beyond the Prairie: The True Story of Laura Ingalls Wilder films
- Cameron Bancroft in the miniseries Little House on the Prairie
- Steve Blanchard in the musical
- Luke Bracey in the Netflix TV series Little House on the Prairie (2026)
