= De Smet, South Dakota =

- Town
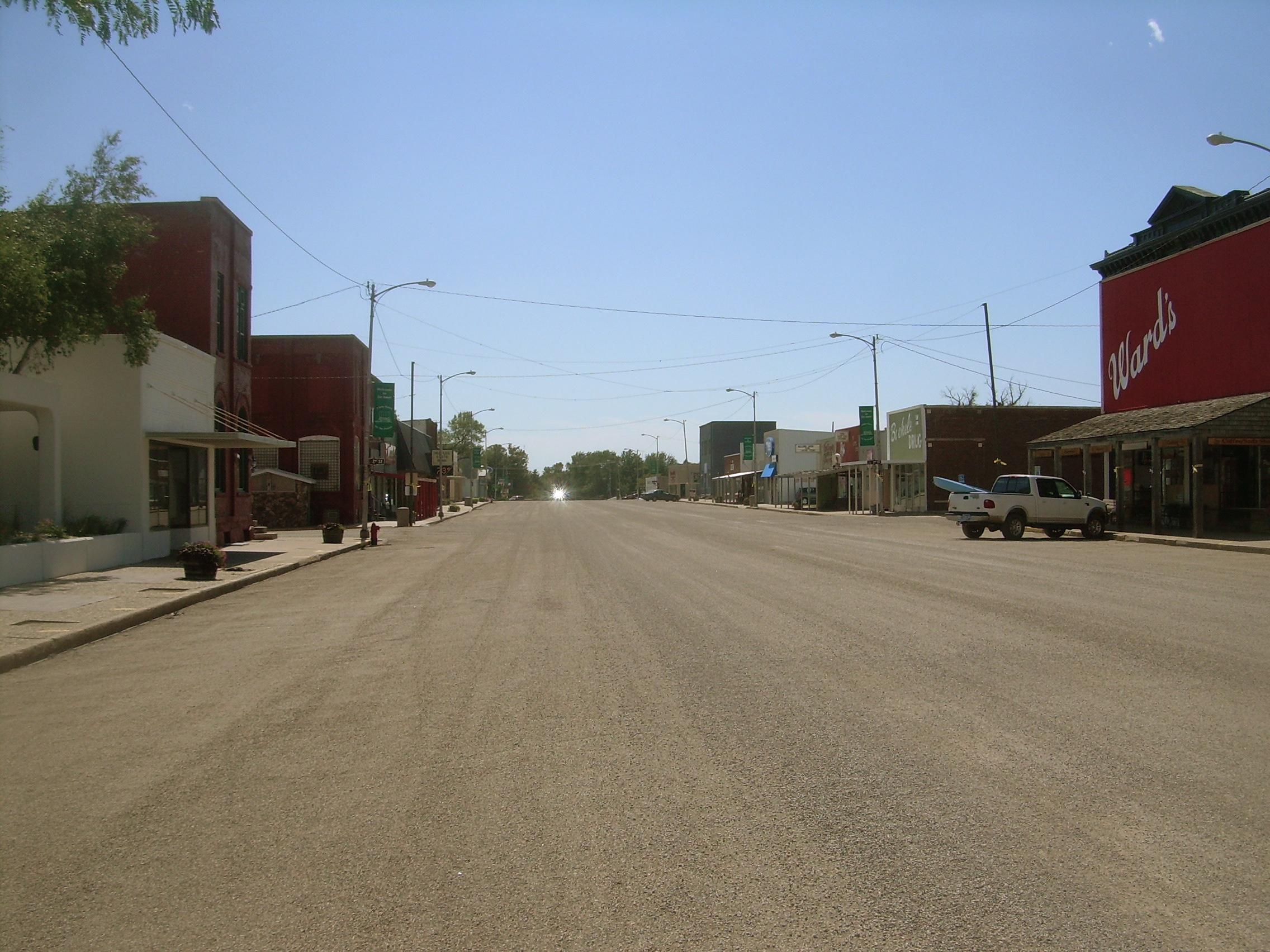
- Downtown De Smet, September 2010

- Location in Kingsbury County and the state of South Dakota
- Coordinates: 44°23′10″N 97°32′59″W
- Country: United States
- State: South Dakota
- County: Kingsbury
- Founded: 1880
- Incorporated: 1883

Government
  - Mayor: Gary Wolkow

Area
  - Total: 1.16 sq mi (3.00 km^{2})
  - Land: 1.16 sq mi (3.00 km^{2})
  - Water: 0 sq mi (0.00 km^{2})
- Elevation: 1,719 ft (524 m)

Population (2020)
  - Total: 1,056
  - Density: 911.6/sq mi (351.97/km^{2})
- Time zone: UTC−6 (Central (CST))
  - Summer (DST): UTC−5 (CDT)
- ZIP Code: 57231
- Area code: 605
- FIPS code: 46-16260
- GNIS feature ID: 1267353
- Website: City website

De Smet is a city in and the county seat of Kingsbury County, South Dakota, United States. The population was 1,056 at the 2020 census.

== History ==
Located in the area of South Dakota known as "East River" (east of the Missouri River, which diagonally divides the state), De Smet was platted by European Americans in 1880. It was named for Belgian Father Pierre De Smet, a 19th-century Jesuit missionary who worked with Native Americans in the United States and its territories for most of his life. In the mid-1880s, prairie fires and failures of crops after a three-year period of drought caused many settlers to relocate their farms and homesteads to easier areas. By 1917, De Smet was a cow town, with many trains passing through every day carrying cattle to market.

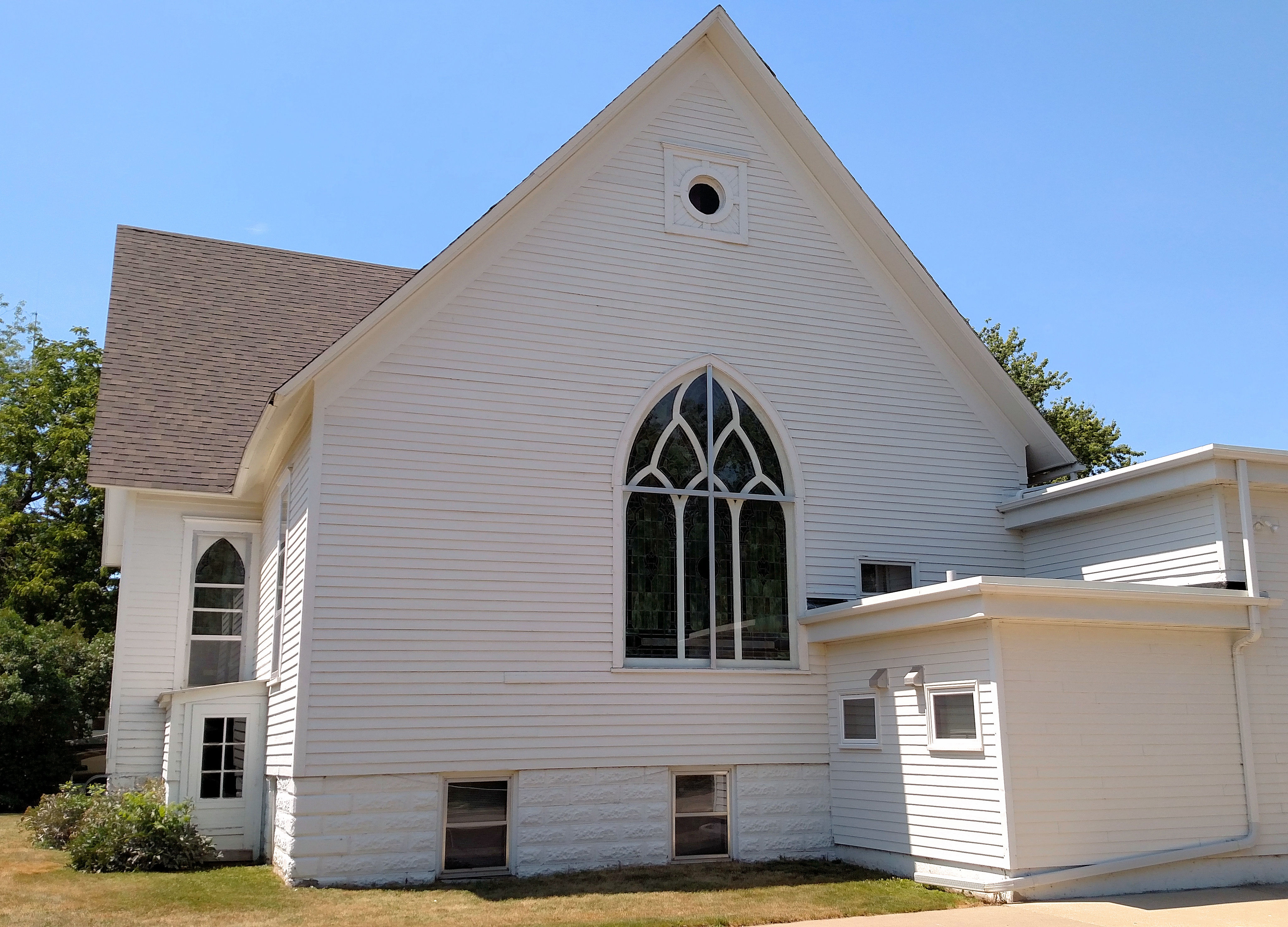
Currently a Christian and Missionary Alliance church, the building was originally the First Congregational Church of De Smet; one of the church's builders was Charles Ingalls.

The Charles Ingalls family, originally of Wisconsin, arrived in De Smet in 1879. Their travels and pioneer life in Minnesota, Kansas, Dakota Territory, and Iowa would be later chronicled in the Little House series of books written by the Ingalls' second oldest daughter, Laura Elizabeth - later known as Laura Ingalls Wilder. Laura Ingalls married Almanzo Wilder, an early settler in De Smet along with his brother, Royal, and sister, Eliza Jane, who was one of the first women to file a solo claim in the area. After their marriage, the Wilders lived just outside of De Smet on farmland. The Ingalls' also had a claim outside of town. In the winter they stayed in the town of De Smet, at least while the girls were still in school. After building a home and starting a farm there, Charles Ingalls helped to found the First Congregational Church of De Smet, later helping to build the church building, with the first service being held there on August 30, 1882. Ingalls and his wife, along with oldest daughter Mary, were among the church's eight original charter members.

== Geography ==
According to the United States Census Bureau, the city has a total area of 1.16 square miles (3.00 km^{2}), all land.

=== Climate ===
Climate data for De Smet, South Dakota (1991−2020 normals, extremes 1893−present)
Month	Jan	Feb	Mar	Apr	May	Jun	Jul	Aug	Sep	Oct	Nov	Dec	Year
Record high °F (°C)	65 (18)	68 (20)	88 (31)	96 (36)	105 (41)	110 (43)	111 (44)	108 (42)	105 (41)	93 (34)	80 (27)	64 (18)	111 (44)
Mean daily maximum °F (°C)	23.2 (−4.9)	28.5 (−1.9)	40.6 (4.8)	55.0 (12.8)	67.1 (19.5)	76.9 (24.9)	81.5 (27.5)	79.1 (26.2)	71.6 (22.0)	56.9 (13.8)	40.7 (4.8)	27.7 (−2.4)	54.1 (12.3)
Daily mean °F (°C)	14.1 (−9.9)	18.9 (−7.3)	30.7 (−0.7)	44.1 (6.7)	56.3 (13.5)	66.5 (19.2)	71.2 (21.8)	69.0 (20.6)	60.9 (16.1)	46.4 (8.0)	31.4 (−0.3)	19.0 (−7.2)	44.0 (6.7)
Mean daily minimum °F (°C)	4.9 (−15.1)	9.2 (−12.7)	20.9 (−6.2)	33.2 (0.7)	45.4 (7.4)	56.1 (13.4)	61.0 (16.1)	58.9 (14.9)	50.1 (10.1)	35.9 (2.2)	22.0 (−5.6)	10.3 (−12.1)	34.0 (1.1)
Record low °F (°C)	−44 (−42)	−40 (−40)	−26 (−32)	−3 (−19)	11 (−12)	27 (−3)	32 (0)	30 (−1)	14 (−10)	−8 (−22)	−18 (−28)	−34 (−37)	−44 (−42)
Average precipitation inches (mm)	0.60 (15)	0.88 (22)	1.36 (35)	2.30 (58)	3.32 (84)	4.06 (103)	3.88 (99)	3.07 (78)	2.78 (71)	1.98 (50)	0.96 (24)	0.74 (19)	25.93 (659)
Average snowfall inches (cm)	6.2 (16)	9.2 (23)	6.9 (18)	4.8 (12)	0.0 (0.0)	0.0 (0.0)	0.0 (0.0)	0.0 (0.0)	0.0 (0.0)	1.6 (4.1)	5.4 (14)	7.3 (19)	41.4 (105)
Average precipitation days (≥ 0.01 in)	3.5	4.2	5.0	6.9	9.7	9.8	8.2	7.1	6.4	5.8	3.8	4.0	74.4
Average snowy days (≥ 0.1 in)	3.9	3.7	3.0	1.6	0.0	0.0	0.0	0.0	0.0	0.8	2.4	4.2	19.6
Source: NOAA

== Demographics ==
Historical population
Census	Pop.	Note	%±
1880	116		—
1890	541		366.4%
1900	749		38.4%
1910	1,063		41.9%
1920	1,035		−2.6%
1930	1,017		−1.7%
1940	1,016		−0.1%
1950	1,180		16.1%
1960	1,324		12.2%
1970	1,336		0.9%
1980	1,237		−7.4%
1990	1,172		−5.3%
2000	1,164		−0.7%
2010	1,089		−6.4%
2020	1,056		−3.0%
U.S. Decennial Census; 2018 Estimate

=== 2020 census ===
As of the 2020 census, De Smet had a population of 1,056. The median age was 50.0 years. 19.4% of residents were under the age of 18 and 30.2% of residents were 65 years of age or older. For every 100 females there were 94.5 males, and for every 100 females age 18 and over there were 90.0 males age 18 and over.

0.0% of residents lived in urban areas, while 100.0% lived in rural areas.

There were 473 households in De Smet, of which 19.5% had children under the age of 18 living in them. Of all households, 47.4% were married-couple households, 20.3% were households with a male householder and no spouse or partner present, and 26.8% were households with a female householder and no spouse or partner present. About 38.0% of all households were made up of individuals and 21.4% had someone living alone who was 65 years of age or older.

There were 533 housing units, of which 11.3% were vacant. The homeowner vacancy rate was 4.0% and the rental vacancy rate was 9.6%.

Racial composition as of the 2020 census
Race	Number	Percent
White	1,007	95.4%
Black or African American	2	0.2%
American Indian and Alaska Native	9	0.9%
Asian	2	0.2%
Native Hawaiian and Other Pacific Islander	0	0.0%
Some other race	0	0.0%
Two or more races	36	3.4%
Hispanic or Latino (of any race)	15	1.4%

=== 2010 census ===
At the 2010 census there were 1,089 people, 478 households, and 290 families living in the city. The population density was 938.8 inhabitants per square mile (362.5/km^{2}). There were 552 housing units at an average density of 475.9 units per square mile (183.7 units/km^{2}). The racial makeup of the city was 98.8% White, 0.1% African American, 0.6% Native American, 0.1% Asian, and 0.5% from two or more races. Hispanic or Latino of any race were 0.5%.

Of the 478 households 24.3% had children under the age of 18 living with them, 52.3% were married couples living together, 5.4% had a female householder with no husband present, 2.9% had a male householder with no wife present, and 39.3% were non-families. 35.6% of households were one person and 22.6% were one person aged 65 or older. The average household size was 2.17 and the average family size was 2.83.

The median age was 49.6 years. 22% of residents were under the age of 18; 4.1% were between the ages of 18 and 24; 17.9% were from 25 to 44; 26% were from 45 to 64; and 29.9% were 65 or older. The gender makeup of the city was 47.2% male and 52.8% female.

=== 2000 census ===
At the 2000 census there were 1,164 people, 524 households, and 300 families living in the city. The population density was 1,102.2 inhabitants per square mile (425.6/km^{2}). There were 582 housing units at an average density of 551.1 units per square mile (212.8 units/km^{2}). The racial makeup of the city was 98.37% White, 0.95% Native American, 0.09% Asian, 0.09% from other races, and 0.52% from two or more races. Hispanic or Latino of any race were 0.69%.

Of the 524 households 24.8% had children under the age of 18 living with them, 50.0% were married couples living together, 3.2% had a female householder with no husband present, and 42.7% were non-families. 39.3% of households were one person and 24.2% were one person aged 65 or older. The average household size was 2.09 and the average family size was 2.80.

The age distribution was 20.8% under the age of 18, 6.0% from 18 to 24, 21.1% from 25 to 44, 20.8% from 45 to 64, and 31.3% 65 or older. The median age was 47 years. For every 100 females, there were 89.0 males. For every 100 females age 18 and over, there were 87.0 males.

The median household income was $27,760, and the median family income was $41,989. Males had a median income of $24,722 versus $20,417 for females. The per capita income for the city was $15,372. About 7.3% of families and 11.1% of the population were below the poverty line, including 7.1% of those under age 18 and 18.3% of those age 65 or over.

== Transportation ==
- De Smet stands at the intersection of the east–west U.S. Route 14 (5th Street) and South Dakota Highway 25 (Poinsett Avenue), which runs north–south.
- The municipally owned Wilder Field airport is situated some 3 miles (5 km) north of the town.
- The Rapid City, Pierre and Eastern Railroad's freight-only line between Tracy, Minnesota, and Rapid City passes through the town.

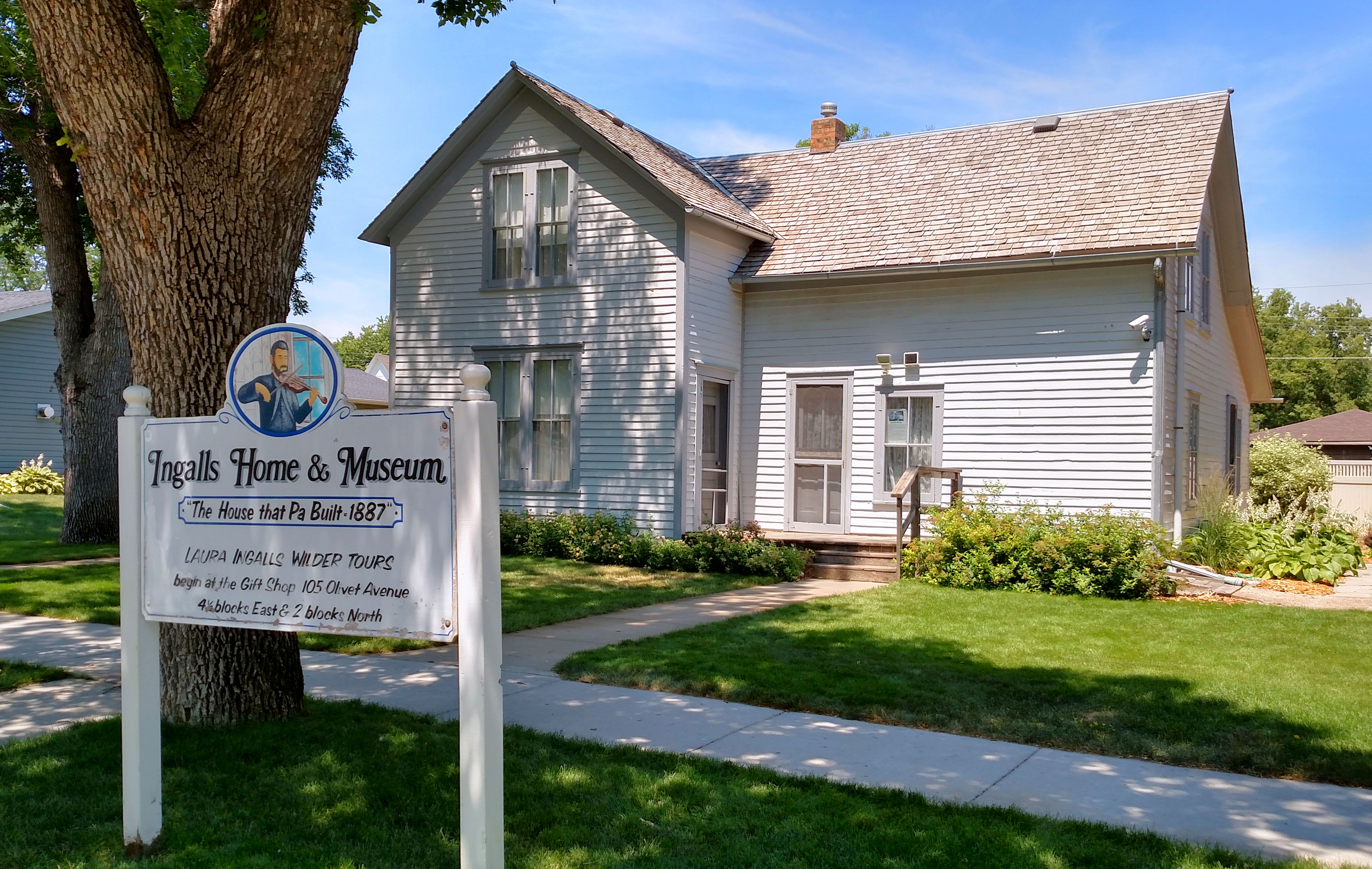
"The House That Pa Built", located at 210 3rd Street SW in De Smet

== Notable people ==
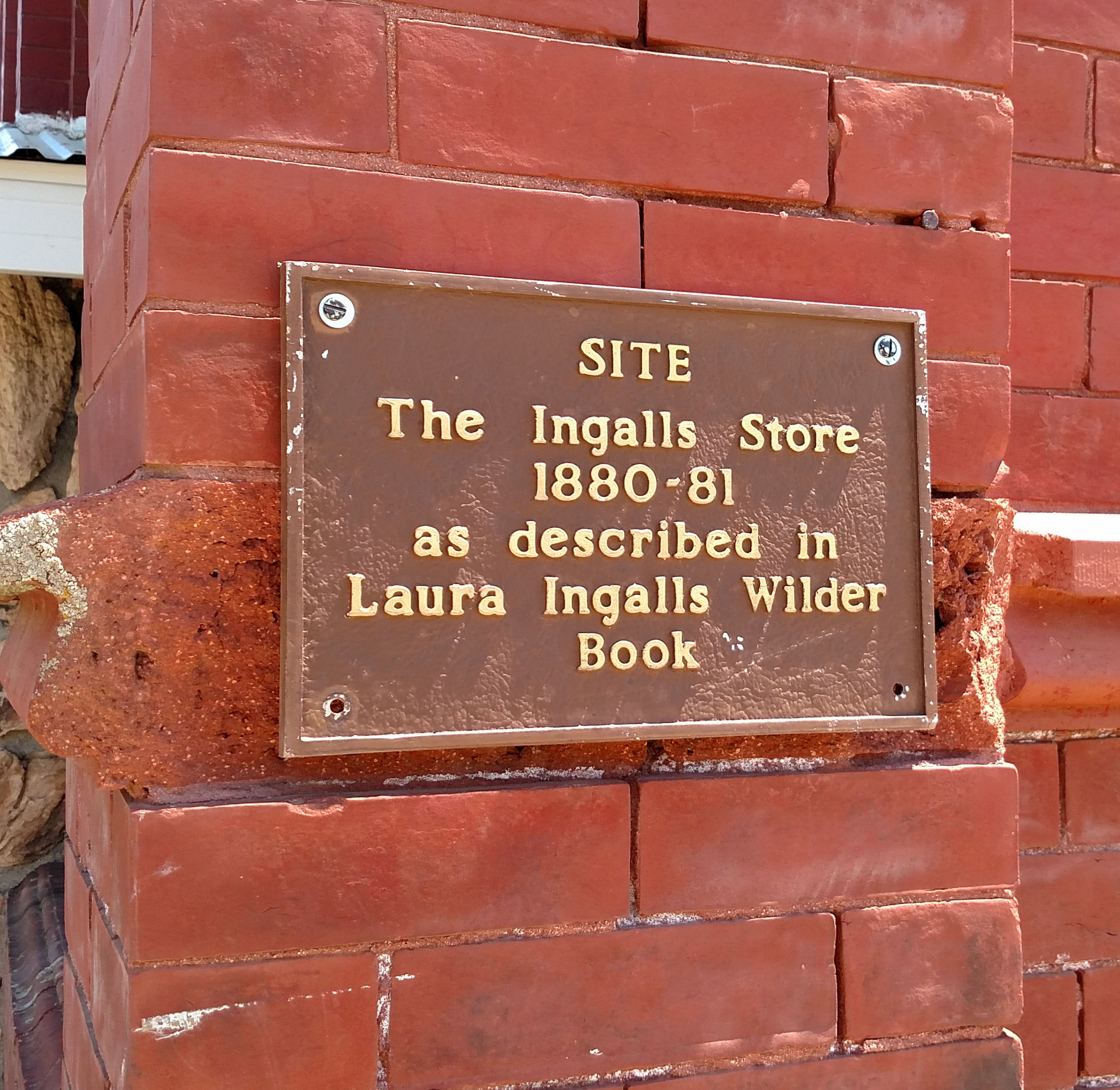
Former site of Ingalls Store, downtown De Smet

De Smet is the town where the family of author Laura Ingalls Wilder finally settled, and is the birthplace of Ingalls Wilder's daughter, author and activist Rose Wilder Lane. Ingalls Wilder's father, Charles Ingalls, moved to De Smet in 1879 with his wife, Caroline, and their children Mary, Laura, Carrie, and Grace. There, after first living in the Surveyor House and a couple of other locations in De Smet, Ingalls built their permanent home that became known via Wilder's writings as "The House That Pa Built".

Construction on the house began in 1887 and was completed in 1889. After settling in De Smet, Charles Ingalls owned and operated the Ingalls Store from 1880 to 1881, a small general-type store that sold various goods for the home. While the store building no longer exists, the location is noted in De Smet's downtown area with a marker on what's currently on the site, a former bank building that now houses Gass Law Firm.

De Smet was also the childhood home of supercentenarian Walter Breuning. Artist-illustrator Harvey Dunn was born in 1884 approximately eight miles from De Smet near Manchester, and painted scenes of frontier life in his later years. Harry George Armstrong, a major general in the United States Air Force, a physician, and an airman, was born in De Smet in 1899.

== See also ==
- List of cities in South Dakota
