= Haley McCormick =

American film and television actress (born 1985)

- Born: October 7, 1985 (age 40); Salt Lake City, Utah, U.S.
- Occupation: Actress
- Years active: 1996–2010

Haley McCormick (born October 7, 1985) is an American film and television actress.

== Filmography ==
- 2010 – Slow Moe
- 2005 – Urban Legends: Bloody Mary
- 2004 – Halloweentown High
- 2002 – Everwood
- 2001 – Little Secrets
- 2001 – The Poof Point
- 2000 – Beyond the Prairie: The True Story of Laura Ingalls Wilder
- 1999 – A Dog's Tale
- 1998 – No More Baths
- 1996 – In the Blink of an Eye
