= Caroline Ingalls =

American schoolteacher (1839–1924)

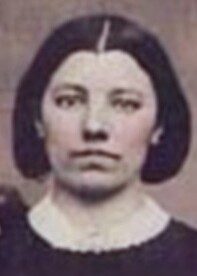
- Born: Caroline Lake Quiner; December 12, 1839; Town of Brookfield, Waukesha County, Wisconsin, U.S.
- Died: April 20, 1924 (aged 84); De Smet, South Dakota, U.S.
- Spouse: Charles Ingalls (m. 1860; died 1902)
- Children: Mary Ingalls; Laura Ingalls Wilder; Carrie Ingalls Swanzey; Freddie Ingalls; Grace Ingalls Dow
- Parents: Henry Quiner; Charlotte Quiner Holbrook

Caroline Lake Ingalls (/ˈɪŋɡəlz/; née Quiner; December 12, 1839 – April 20, 1924) was an American schoolteacher who was the mother of Laura Ingalls Wilder, author of the Little House books. She is depicted as the character "Ma" in the books and the television series.

== Biography ==
=== Childhood ===
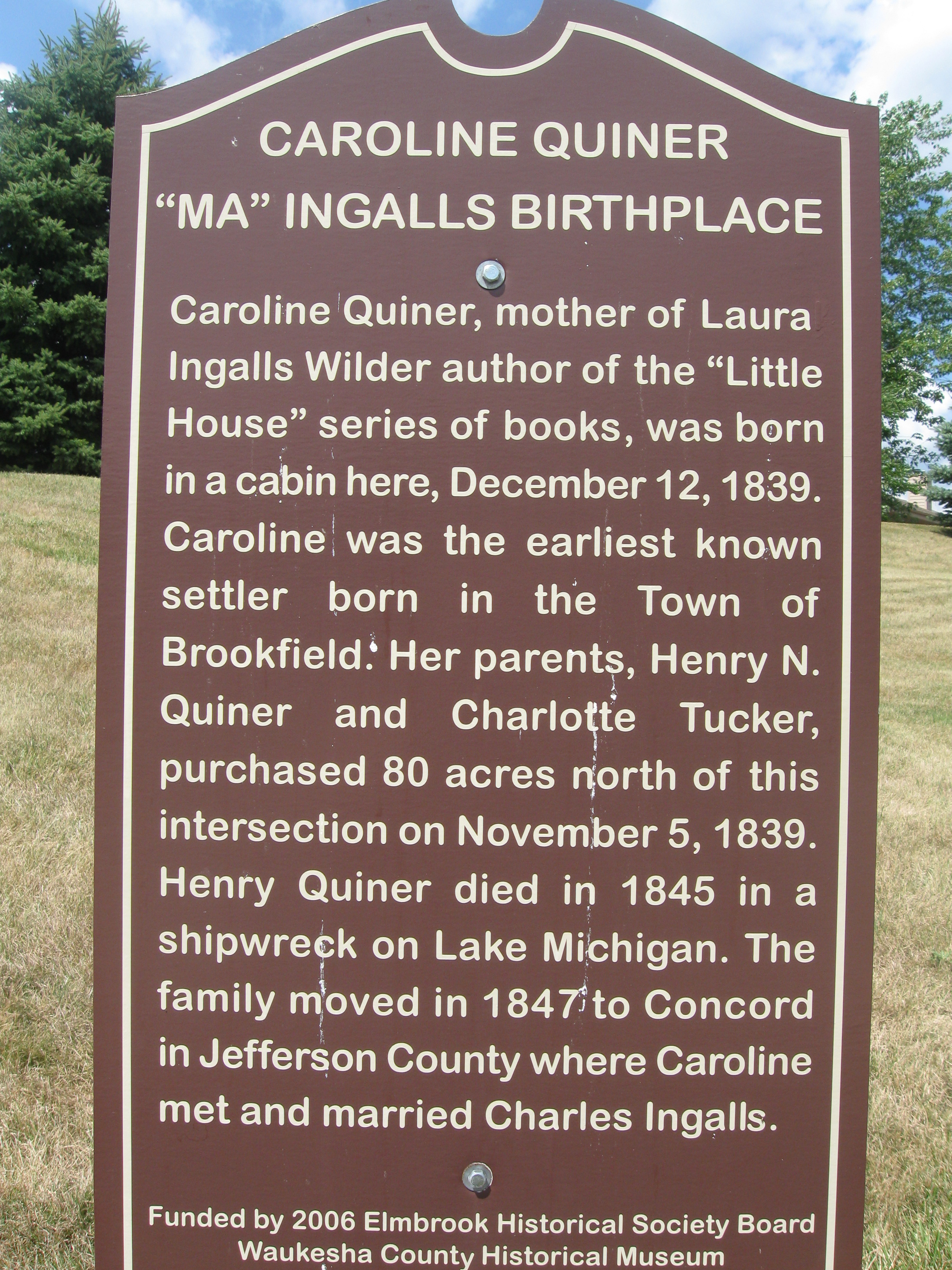
Historical marker at the place of Caroline Ingalls's birth

Caroline Quiner was born in 1839 15 miles west of Milwaukee, Wisconsin, in the Town of Brookfield, in Waukesha County. She was the fifth of seven children of Henry and Charlotte Quiner. Her brothers were Joseph, Henry, and Thomas, and her sisters were Martha, and Eliza. (The Quiners' first child, Martha Morse Quiner, died in 1836.)

When Caroline was 5, her father died while serving as second mate on a ship, the schooner Ocean, when it capsized in Lake Michigan, off St. Joseph, Michigan. There were no survivors. In 1849, her mother married farmer Frederick Holbrook. They had one child together, Lottie Holbrook. Caroline Quiner would later honor her stepfather’s memory by naming her son after him. At the age of 16½, Quiner started working as a teacher.

=== Marriage ===
On February 1, 1860, Quiner married Charles Phillip Ingalls in Concord, Wisconsin. Together they had five children: Mary Amelia, Laura Elizabeth, Caroline Celestia (Carrie), Charles Frederick (Freddie), and Grace Pearl.

==== Freddie Ingalls ====
Freddie Ingalls
- Born: Charles Frederick Ingalls; November 1, 1875; Walnut Grove, Minnesota, U.S.
- Died: August 27, 1876 (9 months, 26 days); South Troy, Minnesota, U.S.
- Parents: Charles Ingalls (father); Caroline Lake Quiner Ingalls (mother)

Charles Frederick "Freddie" Ingalls was born on November 1, 1875, in Walnut Grove, Minnesota, and died August 27, 1876, in South Troy, Minnesota, of indeterminate causes.

In her autobiography Pioneer Girl, Laura remembers that "Little Brother was not well" and that "one terrible day, he straightened out his little body and was dead". Wilder scholar William Anderson noted: "Nearly forty years after Freddie's death, Ma mourned him, telling relatives how different everything would be 'if Freddie had lived'."

=== Travels and later years ===
The Ingalls family traveled by covered wagon from Wisconsin; Kansas (Indian Territory); Burr Oak, Iowa; and Minnesota. In 1879, they settled in De Smet in Dakota Territory.

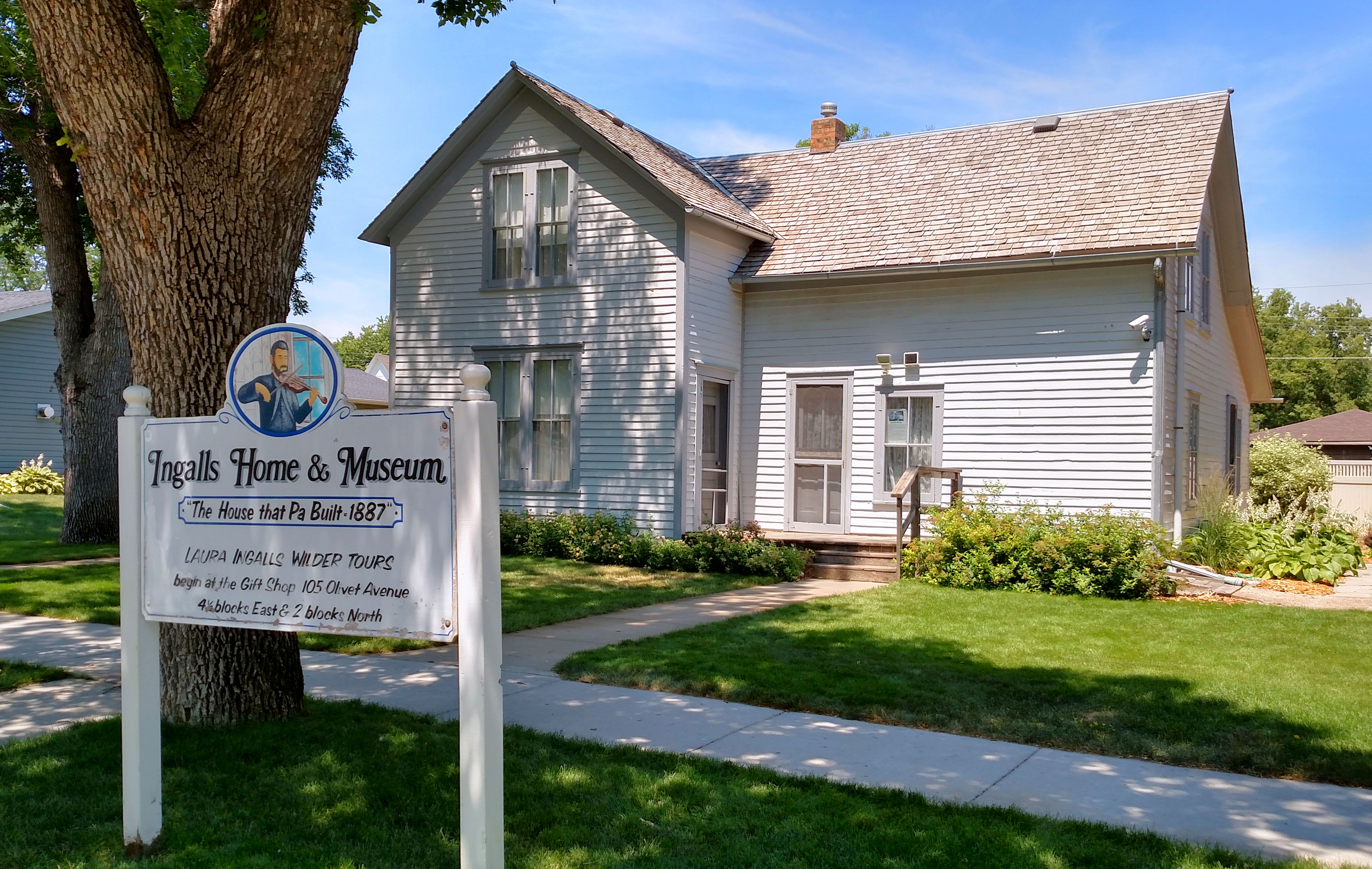
Final home of Caroline Ingalls, built by Charles in 1887, and located in De Smet, South Dakota

After arriving in De Smet, the Ingalls family lived in the home of the local surveyor as well as a store in the downtown area, before homesteading just outside town on a farm by Silver Lake. When the Ingalls family sold the farm due to a persistent pattern of dry years, Charles built a home for them on Third Street in De Smet, known later as "The House That Pa Built". Following her husband's death from heart disease in 1902 at age 66, Ingalls and her oldest daughter, Mary, rented one of the rooms for extra income. Following a long illness, Caroline Ingalls died on April 20, 1924, at the age of 84.

== In the media ==
The fictional series The Caroline Years, an extension of the Little House series, by Maria D. Wilkes and Celia Wilkins, follows Caroline Quiner from her fifth year to her late teens, up to her engagement to Charles. The first title in the series is Little House in Brookfield.

The novel Caroline: Little House, Revisited by Sarah Miller follows the Ingalls family move from Pepin, Wisconsin to Kansas Territory from the viewpoint of Caroline. The novel was authorized by the Little House Heritage Trust.

Caroline Ingalls has been portrayed in the adaptations of Little House on the Prairie by:

- Karen Grassle in the television series Little House on the Prairie and its movie sequels
- Lindsay Crouse in television films Beyond the Prairie: The True Story of Laura Ingalls Wilder
- Erin Cottrell in Little House on the Prairie (miniseries)
- Eiko Masuyama (voice) in Laura, the Prairie Girl
- Crosby Fitzgerald in the Netflix TV series Little House on the Prairie (2026)
