= Carrie Ingalls =

Sister of Laura Ingalls Wilder

Carrie Ingalls Swanzey
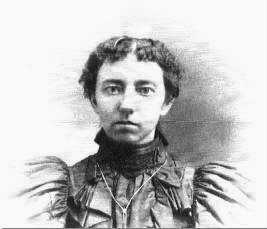
- Born: Caroline Celestia Ingalls; August 3, 1870; Montgomery County, Kansas, U.S.
- Died: June 2, 1946 (aged 75); Rapid City, South Dakota, U.S.
- Resting place: De Smet Cemetery
- Spouse: David N. Swanzey (m. 1912; died 1938)
- Parents: Charles Ingalls; Caroline Lake Quiner
- Relatives: Mary Ingalls (sister); Laura Ingalls Wilder (sister); Charles Frederick "Freddie" Ingalls (brother); Grace Ingalls Dow (sister); Rose Wilder Lane (niece); Almanzo Wilder (brother-in-law)

Caroline Celestia Ingalls Swanzey (/ˈɪŋɡəlz ˈswɒnzi/ ING-əəlz SWON-zee; August 3, 1870 – June 2, 1946) was the third child of Charles and Caroline Ingalls, and was born in Montgomery County, Kansas. She was a younger sister of Laura Ingalls Wilder, who is known for her Little House books.

== Biography ==
Carrie Ingalls Swanzey was described as small, thin and frail, and, according to Laura's books, suffered the most of all the Ingalls family members through the deprivations of the hard winter of 1880–1881. Ingalls was not constantly ill, but she never enjoyed robust physical health during her life. She traveled to several places in her young adulthood seeking a more comfortable climate, including Colorado and Wyoming.

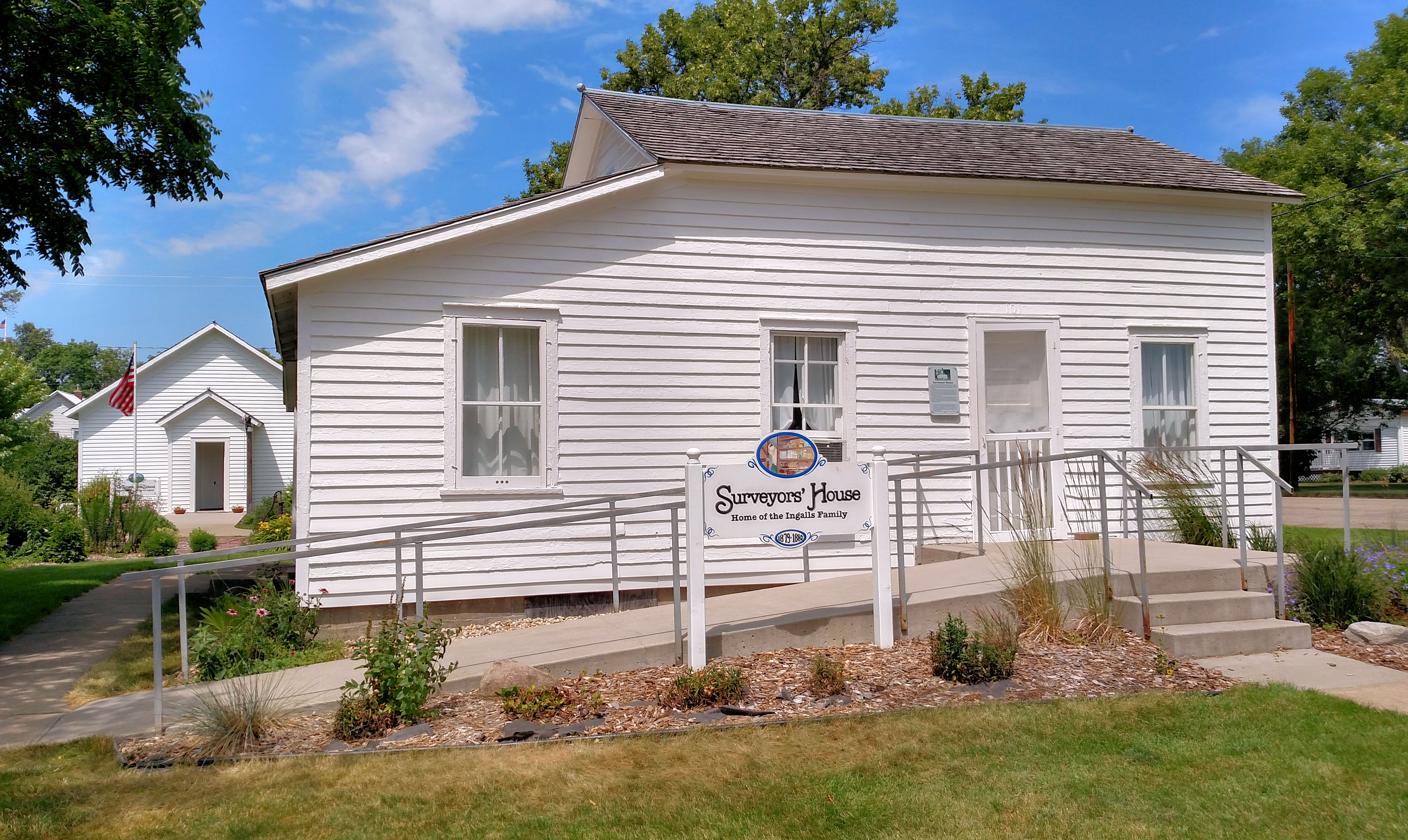
Surveyors' House, first home in Dakota Territory of the Charles Ingalls family

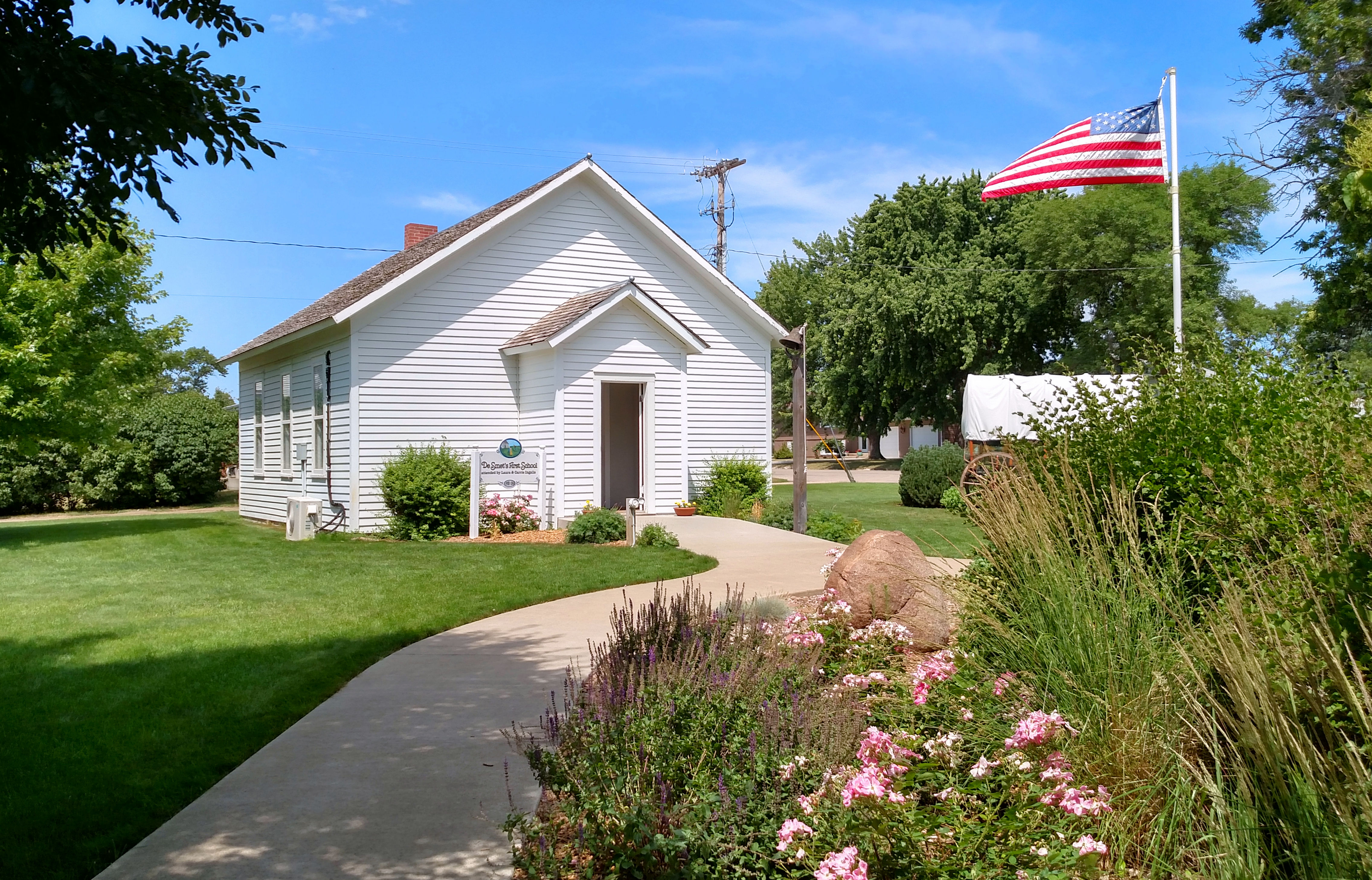
De Smet School, first school in De Smet and attended by Carrie Ingalls and her older sister, Laura

During her late-teen years Ingalls was a typesetter for the De Smet News and, subsequently, other newspapers throughout the state for Edward Louis Senn. She settled in Keystone, South Dakota in 1911.

In 1912, she married widower David N. Swanzey, who is best-remembered for his part in the naming of Mount Rushmore. She became stepmother to Swanzey's two children: Mary and Harold. Harold was one of the workers who helped carve Mount Rushmore, and his name can be found on the granite walls below the monument. He was later killed in a car accident in Keystone, South Dakota, on April 16, 1939, a year after his father's death.

With her sister Grace's help, Swanzey took care of their blind sister Mary after their mother's death in 1924.

Like Grace and Laura, Swanzey suffered from diabetes, and died of complications from the disease at a hospital in Rapid City, South Dakota, on June 2, 1946, at age 75. She was buried in the De Smet Cemetery.

== In the media ==
Carrie was portrayed in the television adaptations of Little House on the Prairie by:

- Twins Lindsay and Sidney Greenbush in the television series Little House on the Prairie and its movie sequels
- Haley McCormick in Beyond the Prairie: The True Story of Laura Ingalls Wilder
- Twins Mavis and Murphy Jerris in the television series Little House on the Prairie 2026.
