= Mary Ingalls =

Elder sister of author Laura Ingalls Wilder

Mary Amelia Ingalls
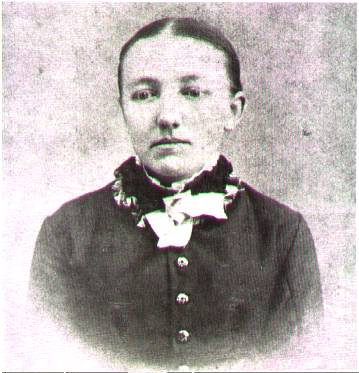
- Mary Amelia Ingalls
- Born: Mary Amelia Ingalls; January 10, 1865 near Pepin, Wisconsin, U.S.
- Died: October 20, 1928 (aged 63); Keystone, South Dakota, U.S.
- Parents: Charles Phillip Ingalls (father); Caroline Lake Quiner (mother)
- Relatives: Laura Ingalls Wilder (sister); Carrie Ingalls (sister); Grace Ingalls (sister); Rose Wilder Lane (niece); Almanzo Wilder (brother-in-law)

Mary Amelia Ingalls (January 10, 1865 – October 20, 1928) was born near the town of Pepin, Wisconsin. She was the first child of Caroline and Charles Ingalls and older sister of writer Laura Ingalls Wilder, known for her Little House book series.

== Biography ==
Mary Ingalls was born January 10, 1865, on her father's 29th birthday.

At age 14, Ingalls suffered an illness – allegedly scarlet fever – thought at the time to cause her blindness. A 2013 medical study concluded that viral encephalitis actually disrupted her eyesight, based on evidence from first-hand accounts and newspaper reports of her illness, as well as relevant school registries, and epidemiologic data on blindness and infectious diseases. Between 1881 and 1889, Ingalls attended the Iowa Braille and Sight Saving School in Vinton, Iowa.

The historical record does not show why Ingalls did not attend school during one year of that time, but she did finish the seven-year course of study in 1889 and graduated. She then returned home to her parents in De Smet, South Dakota, and contributed to the family income by making fly nets for horses.

After her father died in 1902, she and her mother rented out a room in their home for extra income. Following her mother's death in April 1924, she lived for a time with her youngest sister, Grace Ingalls Dow in Manchester, South Dakota.

She then traveled to Keystone, South Dakota, to live with her sister Carrie Ingalls Swanzey. There she suffered a stroke, and on October 20, 1928, she died of pneumonia at age 63. Her body was returned to De Smet, where she was buried in the Ingalls family plot next to her parents at De Smet Cemetery.

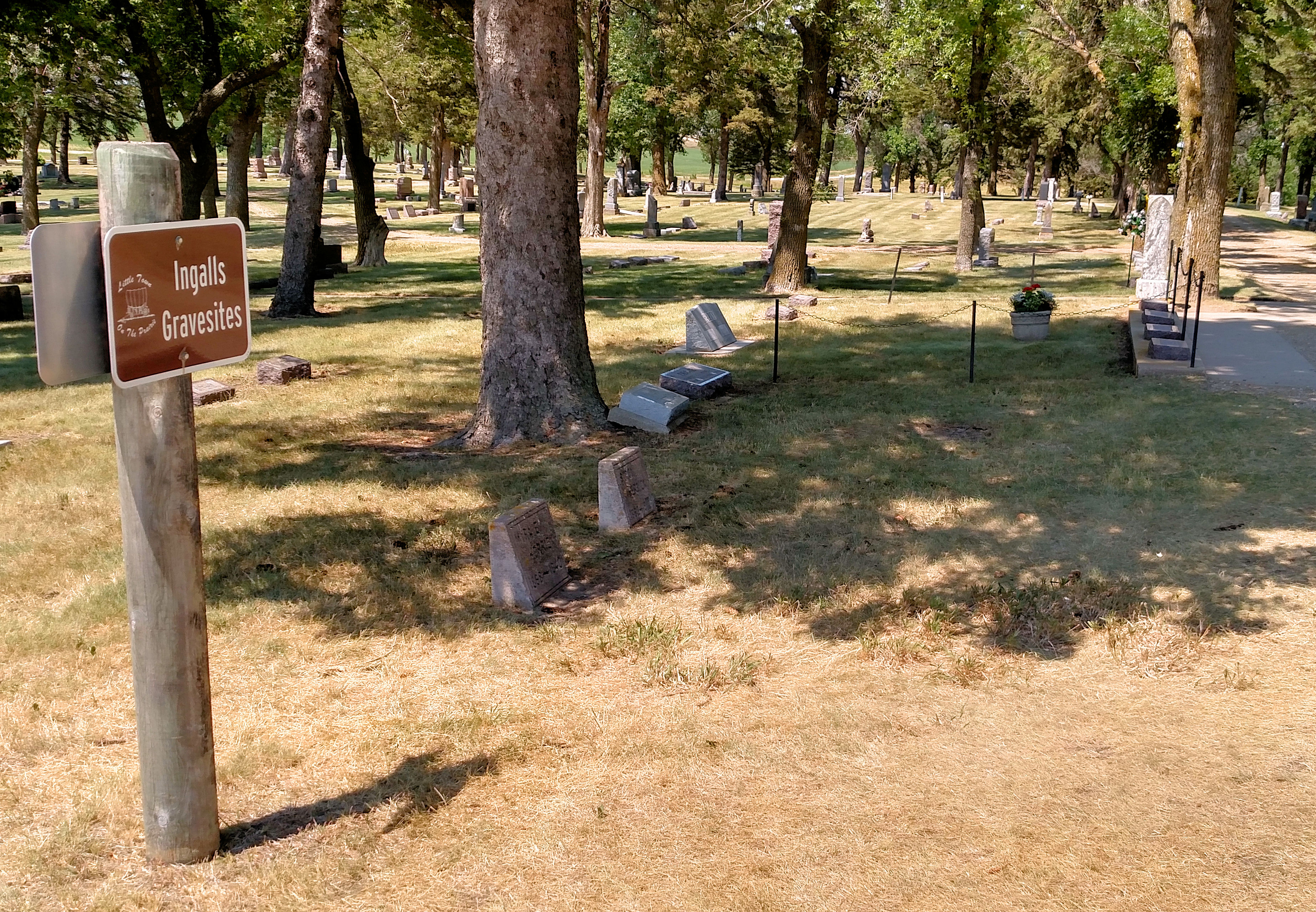
Ingalls family plot, De Smet Cemetery, South Dakota

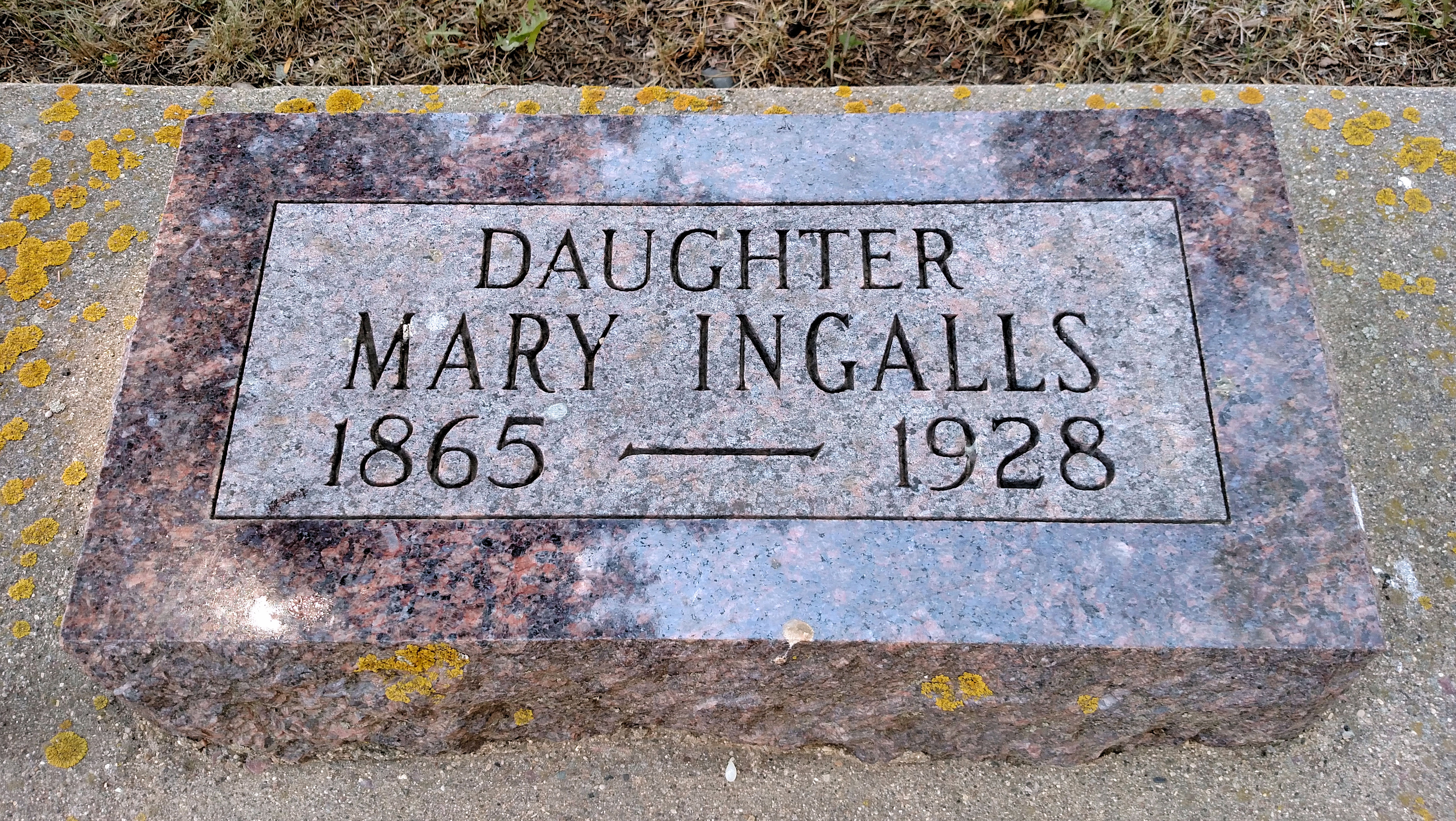
Mary Ingalls' headstone at De Smet Cemetery, South Dakota

== In popular culture ==
Ingalls was portrayed in the television series Little House on the Prairie by actress Melissa Sue Anderson. The television version of Mary Ingalls became a teacher in a school for the blind and married a blind fellow teacher. The real Mary Ingalls never became a teacher nor married, but returned to De Smet to live with her parents after graduating from Vinton. In the 2026 Netflix TV series Little House on the Prairie, in which the episodes are more focused on the original books, Skywalker Hughes plays Mary Ingalls.
