= List of Little House on the Prairie books =

The original Little House on the Prairie books were a series of eight autobiographical children's novels based on the life of Laura Ingalls Wilder and her daughter, Rose Wilder Lane, who heavily informed the content as well as edited each book. The books were published by Harper & Brothers from 1932 to 1943. The eighth book, These Happy Golden Years, featured Laura Ingalls at ages 15 to 18 and was originally published with one page at the end containing the note, "The end of the Little House books." The ninth and last novel written by Wilder, The First Four Years was published posthumously in 1971. Although her intentions are unknown, it is commonly considered part of the Little House series and is included in the 9-volume paperback box set Little House, Big Adventure (Harper Trophy, May 1994).

Several book series and some single novels by other writers have been published for children, young adults and adult readers. They provide fictionalized accounts of the lives of Wilder's great-grandmother Martha Morse Tucker, grandmother Charlotte Tucker Quiner, mother Caroline Ingalls, and daughter Rose Wilder Lane's childhood and teenage years, as well as Wilder's own missing years—those portions of her life not featured in her novels, including most of her adult life. One story not written by Wilder is Old Town in the Green Groves by Cynthia Rylant. It tells the story of the "lost little house" years.

In addition, simplified versions of the original series have been published for younger children in chapter and picture book form.

Some nonfiction books by Ingalls Wilder, and some by other writers, are sometimes called Little House books or Little House on the Prairie books.

The eight Little House books published during the author's lifetime are public domain in countries where the term of copyright lasts 50 years or less after the death of the author.

== Little House in the Big Woods ==
Little House replica at the Little House Wayside, 2007

The story of the first book in the series, Little House in the Big Woods, revolves around the life of the Ingalls family in their small home near Pepin, Wisconsin. The family includes mother Caroline Lake Quiner Ingalls, father Charles Phillip Ingalls, eldest daughter Mary Amelia Ingalls, middle daughter (and protagonist) Laura Elizabeth Ingalls Wilder, and youngest sister Carrie. Although Laura turns five years old during the book, the author was actually only three years old during the real-life events documented in the novel. According to a letter from Wilder's daughter, Rose, to biographer William Anderson, the publisher had Laura change her age in the book because it seemed unrealistic for a three-year-old to have such specific memories. For the sake of continuity, in Wilder's later book Little House on the Prairie, Laura portrayed herself as between six and seven years of age.

Little House in the Big Woods describes the homesteading skills Laura observed and began to practice during her fifth year. The cousins come for Christmas that year, and Laura receives a doll, which she names Charlotte. Later that winter, the family goes to Grandma Ingalls's and has a “sugaring off”. The family and neighbors harvest sap and make maple syrup. The Ingalls family returns home with buckets of syrup, enough to last the year. Laura remembered that sugaring off, and the dance that followed, for the rest of her life.

The book also describes other farm work duties and events, such as the birth of a calf, and the availability of milk, butter and cheese, gardening, field work, and hunting and gathering. Everyday housework is described in detail. When Pa goes into the woods to hunt, he usually comes home with a deer and smokes the meat for the coming winter. One day he notices a bee tree and returns from hunting early to get the wash tub and milk pail to collect the honey. When Pa returns in the winter evenings, Laura and Mary beg him to play his fiddle, as he is too tired from farm work to play during the summertime.

== Farmer Boy ==
Farmer Boy, published in 1933, is the second of the Little House series. It is the sole book that does not focus on the childhood of Laura Ingalls. It is focused on the childhood of Laura's future husband, Almanzo Wilder, growing up on a farm in upstate New York in the 1860s. It takes place before Laura was born.

The book begins just before Wilder's ninth birthday and follows at least two harvest cycles. Set around 1866, it describes in detail the endless chores involved in running the Wilder family farm and Almanzo's part in it. The novel includes stories of Almanzo's brother Royal and his sisters, Eliza Jane and Alice.

Notably, the ages of the Wilder children do not appear to be accurate to their real ages in comparison to Almanzo. Royal is stated to be thirteen, and Eliza Jane and Alice twelve and ten respectively, at the time when Almanzo is just prior to nine years old. In reality, when Almanzo turned nine, Royal would have been nineteen, old enough to leave home, and Eliza Jane and Alice would have been sixteen and twelve years old. This makes it likely that parts of the storyline based around the three older children was fabricated, at least in terms of what Almanzo himself could remember.

Almanzo had a third sister, Laura (1844–1899), who at the time and events in the novel was already about twenty-two and had presumably moved out. He later had a brother, Perley (1869–1934), who was not yet born at the time Farmer Boy is set.

== Little House on the Prairie ==
Little House on the Prairie, published in 1935, is the third of the series of books known as the Little House series, but only the second book to focus on the life of the Ingalls family. The book takes place from 1874 to 1875.

The book tells about the months the Ingalls family spent on the prairie of Kansas, around the town of Independence, Kansas. At the beginning of this story, Pa Ingalls decides to sell the house in the Big Woods of Wisconsin, and move the family, via covered wagon to the Indian Territory near Independence, Kansas, as there were widely circulating stories that the land (technically still under Osage ownership) would be opened to settlement by homesteaders. Laura, along with Pa and Ma, Mary, and baby Carrie, moves to Kansas. Along the way, Pa trades his two horses for two Western mustangs, which Laura and Mary name Pet and Patty.

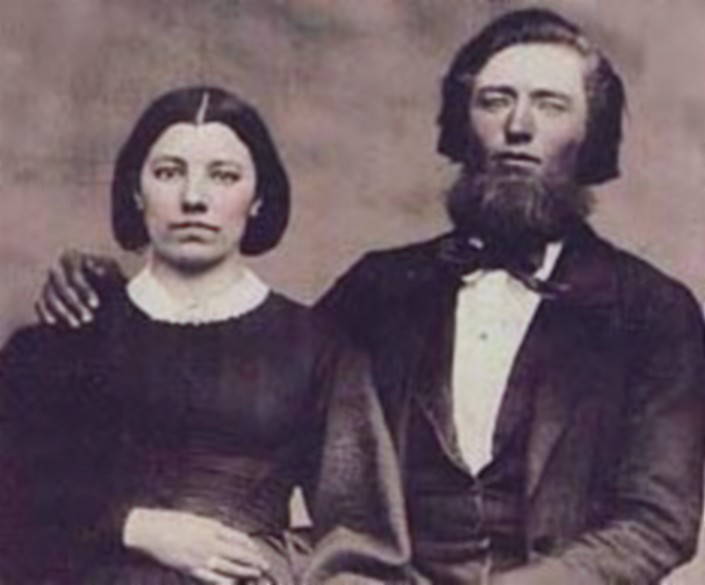
Caroline and Charles Ingalls

When the family reaches Indian Territory, they meet Mr. Edwards, who is extremely polite to Ma, but tells Laura and Mary that he is "a wildcat from Tennessee." Mr. Edwards is an excellent neighbor, and helps the Ingalls family in every way he can, beginning with helping Pa build their house. Pa builds a roof and a floor for the house and digs a well with assistance from another neighbor, Mr. Scott, and the family is finally settled.

Unlike during their time in the Big Woods, the family meets difficulty and danger on the prairie. The Ingallses become terribly ill with "fever 'n' ague" (fever with severe chills and shaking) which was later identified as malaria. Laura comments on the varied ways they believe to have acquired it, with a neighbor woman asserting that it came from eating bad watermelon. Dr. Tan, an African American who was an Indian doctor, takes care of the family while they are sick. Around this time, Mr. Edwards brings Laura and Mary their Christmas presents from Independence, and in the spring, the Ingallses plant the beginnings of a small farm.

Ma's prejudice against American Indians, and Laura's juvenile feelings, are shown side by side with the portrayal of the Osage tribe that lives on and owns the Ingalls family's land. A memorable scene of the Osage departing for the west culminates with Laura's captivation with a serious Osage baby, who stares intently at Laura from a basket hanging off the horse ridden by his mother. Laura clamors to keep that baby ("His eyes are so black"), which shocks both Ma and Pa.

At the end of this book, the family is told that the land must be vacated by settlers as it is not legally open to settlement yet, and in 1875 Pa elects to leave the land and move before the Army forcibly requires him to abandon the land.

Many of the incidents in the book are actual situations that happened to the Ingalls family. In fact, the years the events actually took place were 1869 to 1870. So Laura was actually two to three years old while the Ingalls family lived in Indian Territory during 1869–1870, and she did not remember the incidents herself. She did more historical research on this novel than on any other novel she wrote in an attempt to have all details as accurate as possible.

== On the Banks of Plum Creek ==
The fourth book in the series, On the Banks of Plum Creek, takes place from 1875 to 1877. It follows the Ingalls family as they move from Kansas to an area near Walnut Grove, Minnesota, and settle in a dugout "on the banks of Plum Creek (Redwood County, Minnesota)". Jack, the family bulldog, moves with the family to Plum Creek, though in real life he did not make the journey. Laura's age is still not accurately portrayed in relation to actual events. During the course of the story, Laura is between the ages of seven and nine years old.

Pa trades his horses Pet and Patty to the property owner (a man named Hanson) for the land and crops, but later gets two new horses as Christmas presents for the family, which Laura and her sister Mary name "Sam" and "David". Pa soon builds an above-ground wooden house for the family. Laura and Mary go to school for the first time at Barry Corner School, where they meet their teacher, Miss Eva Beadle, and befriend Christy and Cassie Kennedy. They also meet Nellie Oleson, who makes fun of Laura and Mary for being "country girls." They begin attending the town church on Sundays, with services given by the widely loved Reverend Alden, and Laura and Mary go to Sunday School with their new friends. Laura plays with her bulldog Jack when she is home, and she and Mary are invited to a party at the Olesons' home. Laura and Mary invite all the girls (including Nellie) to a party at their house to reciprocate. The family soon goes through hard times when a plague of Rocky Mountain locusts, or grasshoppers, devastates their crops. For the family to survive, Pa has to go east alone to get a job to make money to get them through the year. The whole family is very excited when he returns from this job. The book ends with Pa returning safely to the house after being unaccounted for during a severe four-day blizzard.

== By the Shores of Silver Lake ==
The fifth book in the series, By the Shores of Silver Lake is based on Laura's late childhood spent near De Smet, South Dakota, beginning in 1879. The book also introduces Laura's youngest sister Grace.

The story begins when the family is about to leave Plum Creek, shortly after the family has recovered from the scarlet fever which caused Mary to become blind. The family welcomes a visit from Aunt Docia, whom they had not seen for several years. She suggests that Pa and Ma move west to the rapidly developing Dakota Territory, where Pa could work in Uncle Henry's railroad camp. Ma and Pa agree, since it will allow Pa to look for a homestead while he works. The family has endured many hardships on Plum Creek and Pa especially is anxious for a new start. After selling his land and farm to neighbors, Pa goes ahead with the wagon and team. Mary is still too weak to travel so the rest of the family follows later by train.

The day Pa leaves, however, their beloved bulldog Jack is found dead, which saddens Laura greatly. In actuality, the dog upon whom Jack was based was no longer with the family at this point, but the author inserted his death here to serve as a transition between her childhood and her adolescence. Laura also begins to play a more mature role in the family due to Mary's blindness—Pa instructs Laura to "be Mary's eyes" and to assist her in daily life as she learns to cope with her disability. Mary is strong and willing to learn.

The family travels to Dakota Territory by train. This is the children's first train trip, and they are excited by the novelty of this new mode of transportation that allows them to travel in one hour the distance it would take a horse and wagon an entire day to cover. When the family reunites at the railroad camp, Laura meets her cousin Lena and the two become good friends.

As winter approaches and the railroad workers head back East, the Ingallses wonder where they might stay for the winter. As luck would have it, the county surveyor needs a house sitter while he is East for the winter, and Pa signs up. It is a winter of luxury for the Ingalls family as they are given all the provisions they need in the large, comfortable house. They spend a cozy winter with their new friends, Mr. and Mrs. Boast, and both families look forward to starting their new claims in the spring.

The "Spring Rush" comes early. The large mobilization of pioneers to the Dakotas in early March prompts Pa to leave immediately on the few days' trip to the claims office. The girls are left alone, and they spend their days and nights boarding and feeding all the pioneers passing through. They charge 25 cents for dinner and boarding, starting a savings account toward sending Mary to the School for the Blind in Vinton, Iowa, which Mary begins to attend later in the series.

With the aid of his old friend Mr. Edwards, Pa successfully files his claim. As the spring flowers bloom and the prairie comes alive with new settlers, the Ingalls family moves to its new piece of land and begins building what will become their permanent home.

== The Long Winter ==
The sixth book in the series take place mostly over the winter of 1880–1881, one of the most notably severe winters in history, also known as "The Snow Winter".

The story begins in Dakota Territory at the Ingalls homestead on a hot August day in 1880. Laura's father, Pa, is haying. Pa tells Laura that he knows the winter is going to be hard because muskrats always build a house with thick walls before a hard winter, and this year, they have built the thickest walls he has ever seen. In mid October, the Ingallses wake with an unusually early blizzard howling around their poorly insulated claim shanty. Soon afterward, Pa receives another warning from an unexpected source as a dignified old Native American man comes to the general store in town to warn the white settlers that there will be seven months of blizzards. Pa decides to move the family into town for the winter.

Laura attends school with her younger sister, Carrie until the weather becomes too severe to permit them to walk to and from the school building. Blizzard after blizzard sweeps through the town over the next few months. The frequent blizzards prevent supply trains from getting through, and food and fuel become scarce and expensive. Eventually, the railroad company suspends all efforts to dig out the trains, leaving the town stranded. For weeks, the Ingallses subsist on potatoes and coarse brown bread, using twisted hay for fuel. As even this meager food runs out, Laura's future husband Almanzo Wilder and his friend Cap Garland risk their lives to bring wheat to the starving townspeople – enough to last the rest of the winter.

As predicted, the blizzards continue for seven months. Finally, the trains begin running again, bringing the Ingalls family a Christmas barrel full of good things – including a turkey. In the last chapter, they sit down to enjoy their Christmas dinner in May.

The book is notable as being the first in which Laura's age is historically accurate. (In 1880 she would have been 13, as she states in the first chapter.) However, Almanzo Wilder's age is misrepresented. Much is made of the fact that he is 19 pretending to be 21 in order to obtain a homestead claim from the US government. In reality, Wilder was ten years older than Laura. In 1880, his true age would have been 23. Scholar Ann Romines has suggested that Laura made Almanzo younger because it was felt that more modern audiences would be scandalized by the great difference in their ages in light of the fact that they married.

== Little Town on the Prairie ==
The seventh book begins in 1881, just after the long winter. It is largely set in the town of De Smet, South Dakota.

The story begins as Laura accepts her first job, which is to perform sewing work, in order to earn money for Mary to go to a college for the blind in Iowa. Laura's hard work comes to an end when she is let go, and the family begins planning to raise cash crops to pay for Mary's college. After the crops are destroyed by blackbirds, Pa sells a calf to earn the balance of the money needed. While Ma and Pa escort Mary to the college, Laura, Carrie, and Grace are left alone for a week. In order to stave off the loneliness stemming from Mary's departure, Laura, Carrie, and Grace do the fall cleaning. They have several problems, but the house is sparkling when they are done. Ma and Pa come home and are truly surprised.

In the fall, the Ingalls family prepares for a move to town for the winter. Laura and Carrie attend school in town, and Laura is reunited with her friends Minnie Johnson and Mary Power. She also meets a new girl, Ida Brown, who has been adopted by the town's minister and his wife. There is a new schoolteacher for the winter term: Eliza Jane Wilder, Almanzo's sister. Nellie Oleson, Laura's nemesis from Plum Creek, has moved to De Smet and is attending the school. Nellie turns the teacher against Laura, and Miss Wilder loses control of the school for a time. Miss Wilder is not very strict, and she wants to be friends with all the children. As a result, the children realize that they can get away with acting up most of the time. When Miss Wilder realizes she no longer has control, she begins to use steadily crueler and unneeded punishments, including humiliating Carrie in front of the entire school and striking her hands. A visit by the school board restores order; however, Miss Wilder leaves at the end of the fall term, and she is eventually replaced by Mr. Clewett and then Mr. Owen, the latter of whom befriends Laura. Through the course of the winter, Laura sets herself to studying, as she only has one year left before she can apply for a teaching certificate.

Throughout this book, Laura's struggles with order and commitment are highlighted. Her grades in school are no longer perfect, and she finds less pleasure in her unchanging life, growing restless and agitated. She focuses her goals on keeping Mary in college, but she seems unsure about what she wants for herself. This comes to a head when she throws down her schoolbooks in a tantrum, declaring that she wants something to change and she is tired of having to act like an adult. Later that night, Pa reveals that the elders of the town are founding a literary society. Far from what the name suggests, it is a weekly source of entertainment for the townsfolk, ranging from spelling competitions to a minstrel show. The literary meetings become Laura's primary reason for endurance, and with something to look forward to she is happy to study again.

At around the same time as occurrence of the literary meetings, Almanzo Wilder begins escorting Laura home from school. Around Christmas, Almanzo offers to take Laura on a sleigh ride after he completes the cutter he is building.

At home, Laura is met by Mr. Boast and Mr. Brewster, who interview Laura for a teaching position at a settlement led by Brewster, twelve miles (19 km) from town. The school superintendent comes and tests Laura. Though she is two months too young, he never asks her age. She is awarded a third-grade teaching certificate.

== These Happy Golden Years ==
The eighth book in the series, These Happy Golden Years takes place between 1882 and 1885. As the story begins, Pa is taking Laura 12 miles from home to her first teaching assignment at Brewster settlement. Laura, only 15 and a schoolgirl herself, is apprehensive, as this is both the first time she has left home and the first school she has taught. She is determined to complete her assignment and earn $40 to help her sister Mary, who is attending Vinton College for the Blind in Iowa.

This first teaching job proves difficult for her. Laura must board with the Brewsters in their two-room claim shanty, sleeping on their sofa. The Brewsters are an unhappy family and Laura is deeply uncomfortable observing the way husband and wife quarrel. In one particularly unsettling incident, she wakes in the night to see Mrs Brewster standing over her husband with a knife. It is a bitterly cold winter, and neither the claim shanty nor the schoolhouse can be heated adequately. The children she is teaching, some of whom are older than she is, test her skills as a teacher. Laura grows more self-assured through her time there, and she successfully completes the two-month assignment, with all five of her pupils sorry to see her go.

To Laura's surprise and delight, homesteader Almanzo Wilder (with whom she became acquainted in Little Town on the Prairie) appears at the end of her first week of school in his new two-horse cutter to bring her home for the weekend. Already fond of Laura and wanting to ease her homesickness, Almanzo takes it upon himself to bring her home and back to school each weekend.

The relationship continues after the school term ends. Sleigh rides give way to buggy rides in the spring, and Laura impresses Almanzo with her willingness to help break his new and often temperamental horses, Barnum and Skip. Laura's old nemesis, Nellie Oleson, makes a brief appearance during two Sunday buggy rides with Almanzo. Laura is annoyed by Nellie's chatter and flirtatious behavior towards Almanzo. Shortly thereafter, Nellie moves back to New York after her family loses its homestead.

Laura's Uncle Tom (Ma's brother) visits the family and tells of his failed venture with a covered wagon brigade seeking gold in the Black Hills. Laura helps out seamstress Mrs. McKee by staying with her and her daughter Mattie on their prairie claim for two months to "hold it down" as required by law. The family enjoys summer visits from Mary.

The Ingalls family finances have improved to the point that Pa can sell a cow to purchase a sewing machine for Ma. Laura continues to teach and work as a seamstress, and Almanzo invites Laura to attend a new "singing school" with him and her classmates. On the last evening of singing school, while driving Laura home, Almanzo – who has by now been courting Laura for three years – proposes to her. During their next ride, Almanzo presents Laura with a garnet-and-pearl ring and they share their first kiss.

Several months later, after Almanzo has finished building a house on his tree claim, he asks Laura if she would mind getting married within a few days. His sister and his mother have their hearts set on a large church wedding, which Pa cannot afford. Laura agrees, and she and Almanzo are married in a simple ceremony by the Reverend Brown. After a wedding dinner with her family, Laura drives away with Almanzo, and the newlyweds settle contentedly into their new home.

== The First Four Years ==
The ninth book in the series, The First Four Years (novel), and the final book to feature Laura as the protagonist, follows the earliest years of Laura and Almanzo's marriage. Found after Wilder's death, the book was published in its original draft form in 1971.

The title is from a promise Laura made to Almanzo when they became engaged. Laura did not want to be a farm wife, but she consented to try farming for three years. At the end of that time, Laura and Almanzo mutually agreed to continue for one more year, a "year of grace". Over the course of the novel, which is set near De Smet, South Dakota, Laura and Almanzo's daughter, Rose, is born, they lose their unnamed son shortly after his birth, they suffer a bout of diphtheria that leaves Almanzo in poor health for the rest of his life, and they lose their house in a fire. The book ends at the close of that fourth year on a rather optimistic note. In reality, a two-year drought and several other tragic events eventually put the Wilders into debt and drove them from their land. They later founded a successful fruit and dairy farm in Mansfield, Missouri, where they lived comfortably until their respective deaths.

== Spinoff series ==
=== The Martha Years ===
Stories about Laura's great-grandmother, Martha Morse Tucker, written by Melissa Wiley, illustrated by Renée Graef:

1. Little House in the Highlands (1999)
2. The Far Side of the Loch (2000)
3. Down to the Bonny Glen (2001)
4. Beyond the Heather Hills (2003)

=== The Charlotte Years ===
Stories about Laura's grandmother, Charlotte Tucker Quiner written by Melissa Wiley:

1. Little House by Boston Bay (1999)
2. On Tide Mill Lane (2001)
3. The Road from Roxbury (2002)
4. Across the Puddingstone Dam (2004)

=== The Caroline Years ===
Stories about Laura's mother, Caroline Quiner Ingalls written by Maria D. Wilkes (vols. 1–4) and Celia Wilkins (vols. 5–7):

1. Little House in Brookfield (1996)
2. Little Town at the Crossroads (1997)
3. Little Clearing in the Woods (1998)
4. On Top of Concord Hill (2000)
5. Across the Rolling River (2001)
6. Little City by the Lake (2003)
7. Little House of Their Own (2005)

=== The Laura Years ===
Stories about Laura, written by Laura Ingalls Wilder:

1. Little House in the Big Woods (1932)
2. Farmer Boy (1933) – featuring the childhood of Laura's husband
3. Little House on the Prairie (1935)
4. On the Banks of Plum Creek (1937)
5. By the Shores of Silver Lake (1939)
6. The Long Winter (1940)
7. Little Town on the Prairie (1941)
8. These Happy Golden Years (1943)
9. The First Four Years (1971)

Little House: The Laura Years is also the title of one 5-volume boxed set published in 1994, which comprises volumes 1 and 3–6. Thus it features the Ingalls family until Laura is 14 years old. The second-published Little House book, Farmer Boy features Almanzo Wilder at ages 8 to 10 in upstate New York. None of the Ingalls family appears in it, and Almanzo Wilder does not otherwise appear in the series until late in the sixth book, so "The Laura Years" has some merit as title or subtitle of this 5-volume selection. The box cover displays headings "The Early Years Collection: A Special Collection of the First Five Little House Books". Only months later, all 9 novels were issued as a boxed set, Little House Big Adventure (Harper, May 1994), with numerals 1 to 9 on the spine—in the sequence published, and listed here; that is, with Farmer Boy numbered 2.

=== The Rose Years ===
Stories about Laura's daughter Rose Wilder Lane, written by her executor, heir, and "political disciple" Roger Lea MacBride:

1. Little House on Rocky Ridge (1993), illus. David Gilleece
2. Little Farm in the Ozarks (1994), illus. David Gilleece
3. In the Land of the Big Red Apple (1995)
4. On the Other Side of the Hill (1995)
5. Little Town in the Ozarks (1996)
6. New Dawn on Rocky Ridge (1997)
7. On the Banks of the Bayou (1998)
8. Bachelor Girl (1999)

=== Little House Chapter Books ===
Written by Maria D. Wilkes simplified and adapted from her "The ____ Years" series

==== Caroline ====
1. Brookfield Days
2. Caroline & Her Sister
3. Frontier Family
4. Brookfield Friends
5. A New Little Cabin

==== Laura ====
1. The Adventures of Laura & Jack
2. Pioneer Sisters
3. Animal Adventures
4. School Days
5. Laura and Nellie
6. Farmer Boy Days
7. Little House Farm Days
8. Hard Times on the Prairie
9. Little House Friends
10. Christmas Stories
11. Laura's Ma
12. Laura's Pa
13. Laura and Mr. Edwards
14. Little House Parties

==== Rose ====
1. Missouri Bound
2. Rose at Rocky Ridge
3. Rose & Alva
4. The Adventures of Rose & Swiney
5. Missouri School Days

=== Laura's Lost Years ===
Stories about what happened between On the Banks of Plum Creek and By the Shores of Silver Lake, the fourth and fifth novels by Ingalls Wilder, written by Cynthia Rylant

1. Old Town in the Green Groves (2002)

=== Little House Sequel series ===
1. Nellie Oleson Meets Laura Ingalls by Heather Williams (September 2007)
2. Mary Ingalls on Her Own by Elizabeth Cody Kimmel (December 2007)
3. Farmer Boy Goes West by Heather Williams (February 14, 2012)

=== The Days of Laura Ingalls Wilder series ===
The Days of Laura Ingalls Wilder: Stories about the people in Laura, Almanzo, and Rose's Mansfield, Missouri home, written by Thomas L. Tedrow:

1. Missouri Homestead (1992)
2. Children of Promise (1992)
3. Good Neighbors (1992)
4. Home to the Prairie (1992)
5. The World's Fair (1992)
6. Mountain Miracle (1992)
7. The Great Debate (1992)
8. Land of Promise (1992)

== Other books written by Laura Ingalls Wilder ==
These books are sometimes called Little House books:

1. On the Way Home: The Diary of a Trip from South Dakota to Mansfield, Missouri, in 1894 (1962)
2. West from Home: Letters Of Laura Ingalls Wilder, San Francisco, 1915 (1974)
3. A Little House Traveler: Writings from Laura Ingalls Wilder's Journeys Across America (2006), LCCN 2005-14975

== Adaptations of the books ==
=== Picture books: My First Little House Books ===
Adaptations of select stories from the Little House on the Prairie books for young children

1. County Fair (1997)
2. Christmas in the Big Woods (1995)
3. Dance at Grandpa's (1994)
4. The Deer in the Wood (1995)
5. A Farmer Boy Birthday (1998)
6. Going to Town (1995)
7. Going West (1996)
8. A Little House Birthday (1997)
9. A Little Prairie House (1999)
10. Prairie Day (1997)
11. Sugar Snow (1998)
12. Summertime in the Big Woods (1996)
13. Winter Days in the Big Woods (1994)
14. Winter on the Farm (1996)

==== My First Little House collection (from above books) ====
1. Winter Tales (1994) (contains Winter Days in the Big Woods, Christmas in the Big Woods, and Dance at Grandpa's)

=== Board books ===
1. Bedtime for Laura (1996)
2. Laura Helps Pa (1996)
3. Laura's Garden (1996)
4. Hello, Laura! (1996)

=== Musical board books ===
1. Happy Birthday, Laura! (1995) (plays "Pop! Goes the Weasel")
2. Merry Christmas, Laura! (1995) (plays "We Wish You a Merry Christmas")

=== Lift-the-Flap books ===
1. Laura's Christmas (1998)
2. Laura's Little House (1998)

=== Paper dolls: The Big Woods Collection ===
1. My Book of Little House Paper Dolls: The Big Woods Collection (1995)
2. My Book of Little House Christmas Paper Dolls: Christmas on the Prairie (1996)
3. My Book of Little House Paper Dolls: A Day on the Prairie (1997)

=== Activity books: My First Little House Books ===
1. My Little House 123 (1997)
2. My Little House ABC (1997)
3. My Little House Birthday Book (1997)
4. My Little House Book of Animals (1998)
5. My Little House Book of Family (1998)
6. My Little House Book of Memories (1994)
7. My Little House Christmas Crafts Book (1997)
8. My Little House Christmas Sticker Book: Santa Claus Comes to the Prairie (1997)
9. My Little House Crafts Book
10. My Little House Cookbook (1996) (comes with child's apron)
11. My Little House Diary (1995)
12. My Little House Friendship Book (1995) (hardcover comes with Locket)
13. My Little House Party Crafts Book (1997)
14. My Little House Sewing Book (1997)
15. My Little House Songbook (1995)
16. My Little House Sticker Book: A Day in the Big Woods (1996)

== Biographical works ==
Dozens of non-fiction books about the life of Laura Ingalls Wilder and several about other family members have been published, including more than one dozen by William Anderson, a schoolteacher in Michigan. These lists are likely to be incomplete.

=== By William Anderson ===
1. The Story of the Ingalls (1967); revised, expanded, or retitled multiply
2. Laura Wilder of Mansfield (1968)
3. A Wilder in the West: The Story of Eliza Jane Wilder (1971)
4. The Story of the Wilders (1973)
5. Laura's Rose: The Story of Rose Wilder Lane (1976)
6. The Horn Book's Laura Ingalls Wilder: articles about and by Laura Ingalls Wilder, Garth Williams, and the Little House Books (Boston: Horn Book, 1987), edited by Anderson, 48 pp., LCCN 87-181392
7. The Walnut Grove Story of Laura Ingalls Wilder (1987)
8. Laura Ingalls Wilder: The Iowa Story (1990)
9. Laura Ingalls Wilder: A Biography (Harper, 1992), 240 pp., LCCN 91-33805
10. Pioneer Girl: The Story of Laura Ingalls Wilder (Harper, 1997, copyright 1998), illustrated by Dan Andreasen, LCCN 96-31203 – 32 pp., "Anderson distills his 1992 biography, Laura Ingalls Wilder, into picture-book length ..."
11. Prairie Girl: The Life of Laura Ingalls Wilder (Harper, 2004), 74 pp., illus. Renée Graef, LCCN 2003-4444

=== By other writers ===
For adult and secondary school audiences

1. Janet and Geoff Benge (Lynnwood, WA: Emerald Books, 2005), Laura Ingalls Wilder: A Storybook Life, ISBN 1932096329, 196 pp. – secondary (senior high) school, OCLC 61130747
2. Anita Clair Fellman (U. of Missouri, 2008), Little House, Long Shadow: Laura Ingalls Wilder's Impact on American Culture, ISBN 0826266339, 360 pp., Google Books
3. Pamela Smith Hill (South Dakota Hist. Soc., 2007), Laura Ingalls Wilder: A Writer's Life, South Dakota biography series, ISBN 097779556X, 244 pp., Google Books
4. Stephen W. Hines (Nashville: T. Nelson Publ., 1994), I Remember Laura, ISBN 0785282068, 274 pp., illustrated – "with articles, interviews and recollections of friends and neighbors, focusing on her later life", OCLC 30669843
5. Sallie Ketcham (Routledge, 2014), Laura Ingalls Wilder: American Writer on the Prairie, ISBN 1136725733, 180 pp., Google Books
6. Teresa Lynn (Austin: Tranquility Press, 2014), "Little Lodges on the Prairie: Freemasonry & Laura Ingalls Wilder", ISBN 978-0990497714, 328 pp.,
7. Yona Zeldis McDonough (NY: Henry Holt, 2014), Little Author in the Big Woods: A Biography of Laura Ingalls Wilder, ISBN 080509542X, 156 pp., illus. Jennifer Thermes, OCLC 881064381
8. John E. Miller (U. of Kansas, 1994), Laura Ingalls Wilder's Little Town: Where History and Literature Meet, ISBN 0700606548, 208 pp., Google Books
9. John E. Miller (U. of Missouri, 2006), Becoming Laura Ingalls Wilder: The Woman Behind the Legend, ISBN 0826261159, 320 pp., Google Books
10. John E. Miller (U. of Missouri, 2008), Laura Ingalls Wilder and Rose Wilder Lane: Authorship, Place, Time, and Culture, ISBN 0826266592, 280 pp., Google Books
11. Kaye Patchett (Detroit: KidHaven Press, 2006), Laura Ingalls Wilder, Inventors and creators, ISBN 9780737731590, 48 pp., illustrated, OCLC 60401822
12. Dorothy Smith (Distributed by Franklin County Historical and Museum Society, 1972), The Wilder Family Story, 36 pp., illustrated, OCLC 4431788
13. Ginger Wadsworth (Minneapolis: Lerner Publ., 1997), Laura Ingalls Wilder: Storyteller of the Prairie, ISBN 0822549506, 128 pp., illustrated, OCLC 34318463
14. Donald Zochert (Chicago: H. Regnery, 1976), Laura: The Life of Laura Ingalls Wilder, ISBN 0809281740, 260 pp., OCLC 1959445

For primary school and juvenile audiences

1. Judy Alter (Chanhassen, MN: Child's World, 2004), Laura Ingalls Wilder: Pioneer and Author, Our people, ISBN 1592960073, 32 pp., illustrated, OCLC 51886244
2. David Armentrout and Patricia Armentrout (Vero Beach, FL: Rourke Publ., 2004), Laura Ingalls Wilder, Discover the life of an American legend, ISBN 1589526635, 24 pp., illustrated, OCLC 51722697
3. Gwenda Blair (Putnam, 1981), Laura Ingalls Wilder, See and read biography, ISBN 0399611398, 63 pp., illus. Thomas B. Allen, OCLC 5498148
4. Emma Carlson Berne (Edina, MN: Abdo Publ., 2008), Laura Ingalls Wilder, ISBN 1599288435, 128 pp., illustrated, OCLC 122337967
5. Patricia Demuth (NY: Grosset & Dunlap, 2013), Who Was Laura Ingalls Wilder?, Who was – ?, ISBN 0448467062, 106 pp., illus. Tim Foley, OCLC 830367565
6. Carin T. Ford (Berkeley Heights, NJ: Enslow, 2003), Laura Ingalls Wilder: Real-life Pioneer of the Little House books, People to know, ISBN 076602105X, 112 pp., illustrated, OCLC 51060229
7. Patricia Reilly Giff (NY: Viking Kestrel, 1987), Laura Ingalls Wilder: Growing up in the Little House, Women of our time, ISBN 067081072X, 56 pp., illus. Eileen McKeating, OCLC 14903960
8. Sarah Glasscock (Austin, TX: Steck-Vaughn, 1988), Laura Ingalls Wilder: An Author's Story, Pair-it books, ISBN 9780817272852, 25 pp., illustrated, OCLC 38011112
9. Beatrice Gormley (Aladdin Paperbacks, 2001), Laura Ingalls Wilder, Childhood of famous Americans, ISBN 0689839243, 221 pp., illus. Meryl Henderson, OCLC 47808772
10. Carol Greene (Chicago: Children's Press, 1990), Laura Ingalls Wilder: Author of the Little House Books, Rookie biography, ISBN 0516042122, 46 pp., OCLC 20631175
11. Wil Mara (Children's Press, 2003), Laura Ingalls Wilder, Rookie biography, ISBN 0516228552, 31 pp., illustrated, OCLC 50676842
12. Lucia Raatma (Chicago: Ferguson Publ., 2001), Laura Ingalls Wilder: Teacher and Writer, Ferguson career biographies, ISBN 0894343750, 127 pp., illustrated, OCLC 45270733
13. Amy Sickels (NY: Chelsea House, 2007), Laura Ingalls Wilder, Who wrote that?, ISBN 0791095258, 126 pp., OCLC 226082270
14. Megan Stine (Milwaukee: G. Stevens Publ., 1992), Story of Laura Ingalls Wilder: Pioneer Girl, Famous lives, ISBN 0836814762, 104 pp., illus. Marcy Dunn Ramsey, OCLC 34076227
15. Tanya Lee Stone (Dorling Kindersley, Laura Ingalls Wilder, DK biography, ISBN 0756645077, 128 pp., illustrated, OCLC 230204902
16. Leslie Strudwick (Mankato, MN: Weigl, 2003), Laura Ingals Wilder, My favorite writer, ISBN 1590360273, 32 pp., illustrated, OCLC 49626315
17. Ginger Wadsworth (Minneapolis: Carolrhoda Books, 2000), Laura Ingalls Wilder, Carolrhoda on my own books, ISBN 1575052660, 48 pp., illus. Shelly O. Haas, OCLC 40954094
18. Pam Walker (NY: Children's Press, 2001), Laura Ingalls Wilder, Real people, ISBN 0516234358, 24 pp., illustrated, OCLC 46314461
19. Alexandra Wallner (NY: Holiday House, 1997), Laura Ingalls Wilder, ISBN 0823413144, unpaged, illustrated, OCLC 476498859
20. S. Ward (NY: PowerKids Press, 2001), Meet Laura Ingalls Wilder, About the author, ISBN 0823957128, 24 pp., illustrated, OCLC 43751877
21. Jill C. Wheeler, ed. Rosemary Wallner (Edina, MN: Abdo Publ., 1992), Laura Ingalls Wilder, Tribute to the young at heart, ISBN 1562391151, 32 pp., illustrated, OCLC 25914254
22. Mae Woods (Edina, MN: Abdo Publ., 2000), Laura Ingalls Wilder, ISBN 1577651138, illustrated, 24 pp., OCLC 43324299

== Other ==
=== William Anderson ===
1. A Little House Sampler (U. of Nebraska, 1988), Ingalls Wilder and Rose Wilder Lane, ed. Anderson, LCCN 87-19208
2. Little House Country: A Photo Guide to the Home Sites of Laura Ingalls Wilder (Kansas City, MO: Terrell Publ., 1989), photographs by Leslie A. Kelly, 48 pp., OCLC 20654987
3. Laura Ingalls Wilder Country: The People and Places in Laura Ingalls Wilder's Life and Books (Harper, 1990), photos Leslie A. Kelly, 119 pp. – "An edition of this book was published in Japan by Kyuryudo Art Publishing in 1988", LCCN 89-46512
4. The Laura Ingalls Wilder Country Cookbook (Harper, 1995), Ingalls Wilder, ed. Anderson, photos Leslie A. Kelly, LCCN 94-42326 – features recipes from Ingalls Wilder's personal collection, OCLC 31433784
5. The Little House Guidebook (Harper, 1996; updated 2002), photos Leslie A. Kelly, LCCN 95-33200, LCCN 2002-279965
6. A Little House Reader: A Collection of Writings (Harper, 1998), Ingalls Wilder, ed. Anderson
7. Laura's Album: A Remembrance Scrapbook of Laura Ingalls Wilder (Harper, 1998) – "photographs and mementos accompany an account of the life and literary career", OCLC 865396917

=== Other editors and writers ===
Songbooks

1. The Laura Ingalls Wilder Songbook: Favorite Songs from the Little House Books (Harper, 1968), 160 pp., illus. Garth Williams, compiled and edited Eugenia Garson, arranged Herbert Haufrecht, OCLC 29908622
2. My Little House Songbook (Harper, 1995), 32 pp., illus. Holly Jones, adapted from Ingalls Wilder, with musical score, OCLC 29908622
3. The Ingalls Wilder Family Songbook (Middleton, WI: A-R Editions, 2011), 425 pp., ed. Dale Cockrell – "published for the American Musicological Society; reconstruction of a family songbook, based on the music played and sung in ... Little House books", OCLC 696781705

Cookbooks

1. The Little House Cookbook: Frontier foods from Laura Ingalls Wilder's classic stories (Harper, 1979), Barbara M. Walker – features "recipes based on the pioneer food ... in the Little House books", with description of pioneer food and cooking, 240 pp., OCLC 4196084
2. My Little House Cookbook (Scholastic, 1996), adapted from Ingalls Wilder, recipes by Amy Cotler, illus. Holly Jones – "original recipes by Laura Ingalls Wilder, adapted for contemporary cooks from the Little House stories", 32 pp., OCLC 38039686

Christmas

1. A Little House Christmas: Holiday Stories from the Little House Books (Harper, 1994), Ingalls Wilder, illus. Garth Williams
2. A Little House Christmas: Holiday Stories from the Little House Books, Volume II (Harper, 1997), Ingalls Wilder, illus. Garth Williams – from the 2nd, 4th, 5th, and 8th Little House novels, OCLC 37810194
3. A Little House Christmas Treasury: Festive Holiday Stories (Harper, 2005), Ingalls Wilder, illus. Garth Williams, 144 pp.
4. My Little House Christmas Crafts Book (Harper, 1997), multiple writers, illus. Mary Collier and Deborah Maze, 42 pp., OCLC 37808575
5. My Little House Crafts Book: 18 projects from ... Little House stories (Harper, 1998), 64 pp., Carolyn Strom Collins and Christina Wyss Eriksson, illus. Mary Collier, OCLC 39015829
6. The Little House Christmas Theater Kit (Harper, 1995), Douglas Love, illus. Renée Graef – director's guide and copies of the plays "Mr. Edwards meets Santa Claus" and "The Christmas Horse" adapted by Love from the third and fourth Little House novels, OCLC 34326045; director's guide reissued by Scholastic, 1999, OCLC 52338616
7. Santa Comes to Little House: from Little House on the Prairie (Harper, 2001), Ingalls Wilder, illus. Renée Graef, unabridged, OCLC 45263874

Television?

1. La petite maison dans la prairie: Walnut Grove, Terre Promise (Montpellier: DLM, 1998), Patrick Loubatière, 221 pp., OCLC 406558932
2. "Little House on the Prairie" from A to Z (Montreal: Imavision, 2005), Patrick Loubatière, translated from the French, 86 pp., OCLC 62594078
3. Les héros de la petite maison dans la prairie (Montreal: Québécor, 1983), Pierre Brousseau, 143 pp., OCLC 851006117

Other

1. Dear Laura: Letters from Children to Laura Ingalls Wilder (Harper, 1996), 152 pp., "children's letters from the 1930s through the 1950s", OCLC 32166284
2. The World of Little House (Harper, 1996) Carolyn Strom Collins and Christina Wyss Eriksson, illus. Deborah Maze and Garth Williams, 160 pp.
3. Inside Laura's Little House: The Little House on the Prairie Treasury (Harper, 2000), Carolyn Strom Collins and Christina Wyss Eriksson, illus. Renée Graef, Cathy Holly and Garth Williams, 112 pp. – "chapters explore various topics from Little House on the Prairie, providing historical and biographical information, recipes, creative activities, and related songs", OCLC 41211419
4. Little House Sisters: Collected stories from the Little House books (Harper, 1997), Ingalls Wilder, illus. Garth Williams, 90 pp., OCLC 35223107
5. Laura Ingalls Wilder's Prairie Wisdom: with Bookmark (Kansas City, MO: Andrews McMeel Publ., 2006), 78 pp., compiled by Yvonne Pope – "quotations taken from L.I. Wilder's newspaper articles and essays", OCLC 70659487
6. The Little House Baby Book
7. The Little House Baby Photograph Album: A Book of Baby's Early Years
