= Mark Teague =

American writer

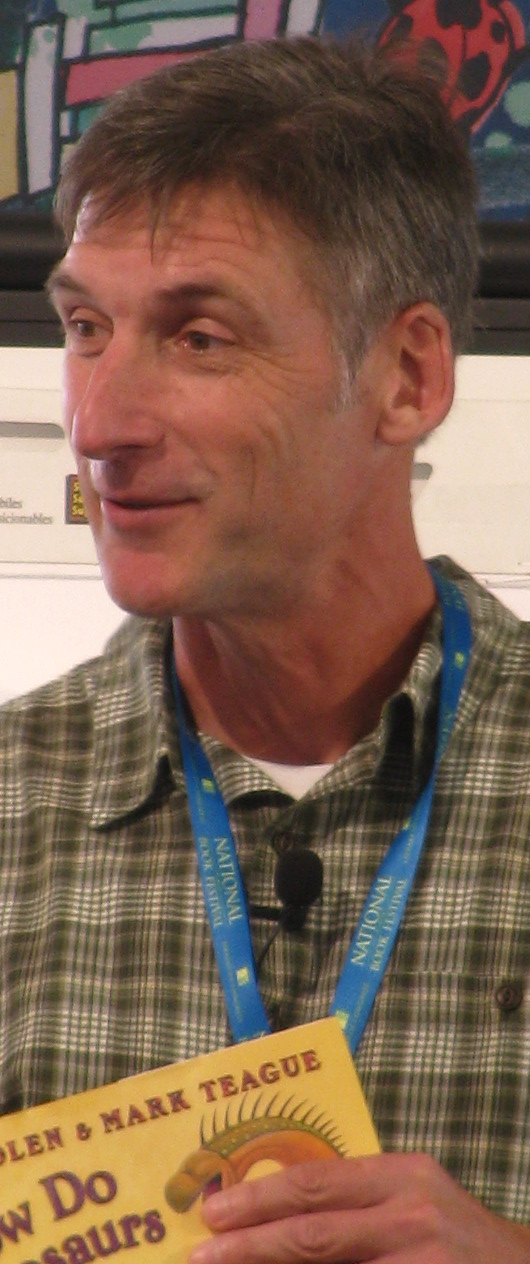
- Teague at the 2013 National Book Festival
- Born: 1963 (age 62–63)
- Occupation: Children's fiction author
- Writing career
- Language: English

Mark Teague (born 1963) is an American author and illustrator of children's books. Teague has illustrated over 40 books including the Poppleton series, the First Graders from Mars series, and The Great Gracie Chase.

== Biography ==
Mark Teague was born in 1963. He grew up in San Diego, California, and went to college at the Paier College of Art in Connecticut in 1985. When he was a child, he started writing books before he could even write. His mother would write the words for him. In interviews Mr. Teague says writing still feels like play to him. He loved books, and was working at Barnes & Noble doing window displays when he decided to write his first book.

Although he had no formal writing training, he quickly became a writer of over 20 children's books. Additionally, he has illustrated over 40 books. Each of Mark Teague's books starts as "notebooks full of sketches and scribbles, strange little drawings and phrases that suddenly come together" he has described in interviews. During his creative process, he doodles and scribbles with no aim. Most of his books address common childhood fears.

Teague's first full-length novel for children, The Doom Machine, was published in October 2009 by Scholastic Inc. Set in 1956, it tells the tale of Jack Creedle, a paperboy whose world is turned upside down when a space shuttle lands in his hometown. Aliens, time machines, and Mark Teague's signature illustrations ensue and he teaches children's book illustration at Hollins University and the Rhode Island School of Design.

== Family ==
Teague lives in Austerlitz, New York with his wife, Laura and two children.

== Works ==
=== Self Illustrated ===
- The Trouble with the Johnsons (1989)
- Moog-Moog, Space Barber (1990)
- Frog Medicine (1991)
- The Field Beyond the Outfield (1992)
- Pigsty (1994)
- How I Spent My Summer Vacation (1995)
- The Secret Shortcut (1996)
- Baby Tamer (1997)
- The Lost and Found (1998)
- One Halloween Night (1999)
- Dear Mrs. LaRue: Letters from Obedience School (2002)
- Detective LaRue: Letters from the Investigation (2004)
- LaRue For Mayor: Letters from the Campaign Trail (2008)
- The Doom Machine (2009)
- LaRue Across America: Postcards from the Vacation (2011)

=== Illustrator ===
- What Are Scientists, What Do They Do? (1991)
- Adventures in Lego Land (1991)
- No Moon, No Milk! (written by Chris Babcock) (1993)
- Three Terrible Trins (written by Dick King-Smith) (1994)
- The Iguana Brothers, a Tale of Two Lizards (written by Tony Johnston) (1995)
- Mr. Potter's Pet (written by Dick King-Smith) (1996)
- The Flying Dragon Room (written by Audrey Wood) (1996)
- Sweet Dream Pie (written by Audrey Wood) (1998)
- The Great Gracie Chase (written by Cynthia Rylant) (2001)
- Toby Littlewood (written by Anne Isaacs) (2006)

=== Collaborations ===
- Sweet Dream Pie by Audrey Wood, Illustrated by Teague (1998)
- Poppleton series by Cynthia Rylant, Illustrated by Teague
  - Poppleton (1997)
  - Poppleton and Friends (1997)
  - Poppleton Forever (1998)
  - Poppleton Everyday (1998)
  - Poppleton in Fall (1999)
  - Poppleton in Spring (1999)
  - Poppleton Has Fun (2000)
  - Poppleton in Winter (2001)
- First Graders From Mars by Shana Corey, Illustrated by Teague
  - Episode 1, Horus's Horrible Day (2001)
  - Episode 2, The Problem with Pelly (2002)
  - Episode 3, Nergal and the Great Space Race (2002)
  - Episode 4, Tera, Star Student (2003)
- How Do Dinosaurs series by Jane Yolen and Mark Teague
  - How Do Dinosaurs Say Good Night? (2000)
  - How Do Dinosaurs Get Well Soon? (2003)
  - How Do Dinosaurs Clean Their Rooms? (2004)
  - How Do Dinosaurs Count to Ten? (2004)
  - How Do Dinosaurs Eat Their Food? (2005)
  - How Do Dinosaurs Go To School? (2007)
