= Missing May =

1992 book by Cynthia Rylant

- First edition
- Author: Cynthia Rylant
- Language: English
- Genre: Children's novel
- Publisher: Orchard Books
- Publication date: 1992
- Publication place: United States
- Media type: Print (Hardback & Paperback)
- Pages: 98
- ISBN: 0-531-05996-0
- OCLC: 24066732
- LC Class: PZ7.R982 Mj 1992

Missing May is a children's book, the recipient of the 1993 Newbery Medal. It was written by Cynthia Rylant, who has written over 100 children's books such as The Islander.

== Plot ==
The novel is set in present-day West Virginia. The protagonist is Summer, an orphaned child who has been passed from one apathetic relative to another. At age six, she meets her Aunt May and Uncle Ob. The kindly old couple notices that, although Summer is not mistreated, she is virtually ignored by her caretakers and decide to take Summer home to their rickety trailer home in the hills of the Appalachian Mountains. Summer thrives under their care, feeling that she finally has a home.

Six years after Summer moves in, Aunt May dies suddenly in the garden. Summer must cope with her own grief while worrying about Uncle Ob, who is overwhelmed by the thought of living without his beloved wife. Uncle Ob decides to try contacting May's spirit, after he experiences the sensation that she has tried to communicate with him. He is assisted in this endeavor by Cletus Underwood, a classmate of Summer's, who provides information on a supposed spirit medium of some renown. Summer views his ideas with some skepticism, but is willing to try anything that might alleviate her uncle's sorrow. The three take a roadtrip to meet with the medium, only to discover that she had recently died. Uncle Ob is initially crushed by this news, and Summer fears that this disappointment was the last blow to his will to live. However, on the return trip, Uncle Ob suddenly snaps out of his depression, deciding to continue living on for Summer's sake.

== Characters ==
- Summer- A young girl who serves as the main character and narrator of the story. She was orphaned as a baby, and was passed from relative to relative, until being taken in permanently by her Aunt May and Uncle Ob, who provided her with a happy, love-filled home. Summer is distraught when May dies, but is even more worried about Uncle Ob.
- Uncle Ob- Summer's uncle and May's husband. He sinks into an extreme depression once May dies, and Summer fears that he has given up on living. He eventually becomes convinced that May's spirit is still visiting them, and seeks out a way to contact her. He is an accomplished craftsman, who has carved dozens of whirligigs over the years.
- Cletus- A classmate of Summer's, he is viewed as the strangest student at her school. He meets Uncle Ob by chance shortly after May's death, and the two quickly become friends. Although Summer is not fond of him, she tolerates his presence since Ob enjoys his company. She begins to look more kindly upon him as time goes on. He claims to have had a near-death experience as a child, which gives Ob hope of being able to contact May's spirit.

== Publication ==
The novel was published on March 1, 1992, by Orchard Books.

== Reception ==
A review in Publishers Weekly described Summer as having a "direct, matter-of-fact voice occasionally laced with irony and wry humor", although the distance of the narrative from the grief of its main character was criticized. The novel was described by Kirkus Reviews as "A beautifully written, life-affirming book".

Awards
Preceded by Shiloh	Newbery Medal recipient 1993	Succeeded by The Giver
