= Every Living Thing =

Every Living Thing may refer to:

- Every Living Thing (Roberts book), a 2024 book about the naturalists Carl Linnaeus and Georges-Louis Leclerc by Jason Roberts
- Every Living Thing (short story collection), a 1985 children's short story collection by Cynthia Rylant
- Every Living Thing, a 1992 book by James Herriot
- Every Living Thing, a 2009 book on biology by Rob Dunn
