= Sarah Glasscock =

American novelist

Sarah Glasscock (born November 4, 1952) (Note: The U.S. Library of Congress cites for her birthdate Cataloging in Publication data filed in 1988.) is an American writer of fiction and education works. She is a fifth-generation Texan living in Austin, Texas. Glasscock completed her M.A. in creative writing at New York University, and has been the recipient of several writing fellowships. Her short stories have appeared in numerous journals; Random House published her first novel, Anna L.M.N.O. (1988).

== Life ==
Sarah Jean Glasscock was born in El Paso, Texas, and raised in Alpine, Texas. She is the daughter of Jean Epperson Glasscock and James Glasscock, who owned and operated the Alpine Avalanche from 1954 to 1974. Glasscock is a graduate of the University of Texas at Austin, and completed her M.A. in creative writing at New York University. She worked in New York City publishing before returning to Austin, Texas, in the 1990s.

== Influences ==
Early influences on Glasscock included her parents, who were also working journalists on their newspaper, the Alpine Avalanche, as well as her great-aunt, Sallie Glasscock, who was the author of two historical works situated in Texas. During her graduate studies at New York University, Glasscock studied with Hannah Green, Alix Kates Shulman, and E.L. Doctorow. Currently, she interacts with a circle of women writers and editors for mutual support and critique.

== Awards ==
- MacDowell Colony Fellowship.
- Dobie Paisano Fellowship.

== Works ==
- Anna L.M.N.O., Random House, 1988.
- Numerous educational books for elementary and middle school.
- Short stories in Boulevard, Descant, and Sequoia.
