= When I Was Young in the Mountains =

1982 children's book by Cynthia Rylant

- First edition
- Author: Cynthia Rylant
- Illustrator: Diane Goode
- Language: English
- Genre: Children's novel
- Publisher: Puffin Books
- Publication date: 1982
- Publication place: United States
- Media type: Print (hardback & paperback)
- Pages: 32 pp.
- ISBN: 0-14-054875-0
- OCLC: 30455914

When I Was Young in the Mountains is a 1982 children's book by Cynthia Rylant. The book was a finalist for a National Book Award for Children's Books in 1983 and Diane Goode's illustrations won it a Caldecott Honor for children's literature.

== Plot summary ==
The book tells the story of the main character's youth in West Virginia, in the Appalachian Mountains. The book is based on Rylant's real life growing up in West Virginia.

== About the Author ==
A West Virginia native, Cynthia Rylant spent her childhood surrounded by relatives and the Appalachian Mountains. Though she was born in Hopewell, West Virginia (June 6, 1954), Rylant primarily resided with her grandparents in Cool Ridge, West Virginia, after facing her parents' divorce. Drawing inspiration from her father's love of storytelling, Rylant fostered the gift she shared with her father into a career.

== Awards and Critical Praise ==
- When I Was Young In the Mountains was named among the best children and young adult books of 1982 by Horn Book Fanfare.
- American Book Award in 1982.
- Diane Goode's illustrations won the book a Caldecott Honor for children's literature.
