= Poppleton (book series) =

Series of children's books about a pig named Poppleton

First book in the series

Poppleton is a series of children's books written by American author Cynthia Rylant and illustrator Mark Teague. The stories follow a pig named Poppleton who moves from the city to a small town and enjoys humorous adventures with his friends and neighbors. This series is marketed to children ages 5 to 9. Poppleton was the mascot for American Library Association's 1997 reading campaign.

== Characters ==
- Poppleton – a pig who has recently moved to the country from the city. He is the main character.
- Cherry Sue – a llama who lives next door to Poppleton and appears more often than other minor characters.
- Filmore – a goat who is Poppleton's neighbor.
- Hudson – a mouse that is living close by to Poppleton.
- Zacko – a ferret who is Poppleton's friend and owns a coat store.
- Marsha – a rabbit who is Poppleton's friend and works at a bike store.
- Gus – a turtle who is the mail carrier.
- Patrick – a finch who inadvertently knocked down Poppleton's icicles. Poppleton was gravely dismayed but Patrick had the ingenious idea to build something with the icicles. After all their hard work, they enjoyed a candlelit dinner together.

== Books in the series ==
All published by Blue Sky Press.

- Poppleton (1997). ISBN 0-590-84783-X.
- Poppleton And Friends (1997). ISBN 0-590-84788-0.
- Poppleton Everyday (1998). ISBN 0-590-84853-4.
- Poppleton Forever (1998). ISBN 0-590-84844-5.
- Poppleton In Fall (1999). ISBN 0-590-84794-5.
- Poppleton In Spring (1999). ISBN 0-590-84822-4.
- Poppleton Has Fun (2000). ISBN 0-590-84841-0.
- Poppleton In Winter (2001). ISBN 0-590-84838-0.
- Poppleton At Christmas (2022). ISBN 9781338566772.
- Poppleton In Summer (2023). ISBN 978-1338566758.
