= John Wesley (artist) =

American painter (1928–2022)

- Born: John Mercer Wesley; November 25, 1928; Los Angeles, California, U.S.
- Died: February 10, 2022 (aged 93); New York City, New York, U.S.
- Known for: Painting
- Movement: Pop art, surrealism, erotic art
- Spouses: Alice Richter (m. 1947; div. 1959) Jo Baer (m. 1959; div. 1970) Hannah Green (m. 1971; died 1996)
- Partner: Patricia Broderick (1997–2003; her death)
- Children: 2
- Awards: Guggenheim Fellowship, American Academy of Arts and Letters, National Endowment for the Arts

John Wesley. Daddy's Home, acrylic on canvas, 39" x 65", 1972.

John Wesley (November 25, 1928 – February 10, 2022) was an American painter, known for idiosyncratic figurative works of eros and humor, rendered in a precise, hard-edged, deadpan style. Wesley's art largely remained true to artistic premises that he established in the 1960s: a comic-strip style of flat shapes, delicate black outline, a limited matte palette of saturated colors, and elegant, pared-down compositions. His characteristic subjects included cavorting nymphs, nudes, infants and animals, pastoral and historical scenes, and 1950s comic strip characters in humorously blasphemous, ambiguous scenarios of forbidden desire, rage or despair.

Early on, art critics categorized Wesley as a Pop artist, due to his appropriation of the visual language and, at times, iconography of popular culture. Later critics, however, regarded him as an art outsider whose work eluded categorization, noting among other things, his psychological plumbing of a (largely male) American unconscious, formal affinities with abstraction, and wide-ranging art-historical borrowings. Artforum's Jenifer Borum described Wesley's work as combining "a Pop vocabulary, a refined Minimal sensibility, and a surrealistic proclivity for uncanny juxtapositions," while Dave Hickey likened him to an eighteenth-century Rococo "fabulist," citing his penchant for erotic narrative.

Wesley's work has been exhibited at the Whitney Museum of American Art, MoMA PS1, Stedelijk Museum Amsterdam, Portikus (Frankfurt), and the Chinati Foundation, among others. It belongs to public art collections including the Museum of Modern Art, Museum of Contemporary Art, Los Angeles, and Whitney Museum. In 1976, he was awarded a Guggenheim Fellowship.

== Life and career ==
John Mercer Wesley was born in Los Angeles, California in 1928, to Elsa Marie Patzwaldt and Ner Wesley. In 1934, he discovered his father at home, dead of a stroke—an event that had a profoundly traumatic, long-term impact on him. Afterwards, he lived in an orphanage for a year, until his mother remarried and assumed custody. He began to make abstract expressionist paintings in the early 1950s despite a lack of any formal art training, eventually taking evening art classes while working blue-collar jobs as a dishwasher, warehouse stocker and aircraft riveter.

Over the next decade, two jobs directly influenced his early painting. In 1953, he began a five-year employment in the illustration department at Northrop Aircraft Corporation, where he simplified blueprints into drawings; in 1960, he moved to New York with his second wife, the minimalist painter Jo Baer, and took a job as a postal clerk. Drawing on both experiences, he incorporated simple, functional line, matte cyanotype-blue color and iconic postal forms (shields, stamps, seals) in banner- and plaque-like paintings influenced by the deadpan imagery of Jasper Johns and related to work by Pop artists Roy Lichtenstein, James Rosenquist and Andy Warhol. During this period Wesley developed close closest personal affiliations with minimalist artists Donald Judd, Dan Flavin, Robert Ryman and Sol LeWitt. Despite outward disparities in their approaches, Judd and Flavin were longtime supporters of Wesley's work; Judd reserved permanent space for Wesley's paintings alongside well-known minimalist works at his Chinati Foundation complex in Marfa, Texas.

Wesley's early exhibition history included group shows at the Los Angeles County Museum of Art (1959); Oakland Art Museum (1963); three American Federation of the Arts international traveling shows (1966–8); the 1968–9 Whitney Painting Annual (precursor to its biennial); Documenta 5 (1972); and solo shows at Robert Elkon Gallery (1963–84). In his later career, surveys of Wesley's work were held at the Stedelijk Museum (1993, travelling to Portikus); MoMA PS1 (2000, organized by Alanna Heiss); the Harvard Art Museums (Sert Gallery, 2001, organized by Linda Norden); Chinati Foundation (2004); Kunsthalle Nürnberg (2006); Fondazione Prada (2009); and in several exhibitions at Fredericks & Freiser in New York. The Prada show was curated by Germano Celant as part of the Venice Biennale and featured 150 works.

== Work and reception ==
Throughout his career, Wesley appropriated popular media imagery for his work. Critics, however, have deemed his recontextualizations more discomfiting and peculiar than those of Pop art, arguing that his style was largely a point of departure for subtle investigations of form and psychological content. They have identified several key distinctions in his work: its poetic mix of charm and trauma, sweetness and underlying eroticism; preoccupations with personal memory, desire and fantasy rather than consumer, commercial and industrial imagery; and the breadth of his bricolage, which nodded toward sources including ancient friezes and vase painting, Japanese art, Art Nouveau, Matisse, historical representation and contemporary wallpaper patterns.

Although Wesley disliked explaining his work or being didactic, his jarring couplings (e.g., human-animal) and Minimalist-like repetitions of figures—repositioned and manipulated in paper-doll fashion in rows or patterns—suggest elusive narratives, deeply personal, mysterious meanings and irreverent social content. Elaborating on his reading of Wesley as a fabulist, Dave Hickey wrote that Wesley "reinvented the casual, libidinous allegories of Rococo painting" for use as veiled, urbane commentary directed at the contemporary hegemony of Puritan values in America, while curator Carolyn Christov-Bakargiev noted, "Under the surface of his absurd utterances, a scathing commentary on society, superficiality, power or abuse can be found, if one only wants to look for it."

John Wesley, The Aviator's Daughters, Duco and oil on canvas, 57" x 48", 1963.

=== Early work ===
Wesley's visual fixations and style registered their strange, idiosyncratic qualities as early as 1963. He placed cartoonish, expressively posed group and individual portraits and historical figures in vacant spaces, framed by symmetrical, Art Nouveau-like borders of flowers, birds or—in The Aviator's Daughters (1963)—silhouetted World War I biplanes, creating a counterpoint of masculine and feminine. In the middle of the decade, this imagery gave way to unsettling erotic paintings of nude and semi-clothed figures (often seemingly oblivious women) and personified animals—frogs, camels, bears, apes, birds, squirrels—some arranged in repetitive frieze-like formations with flat-painted borders. Among these works were: Dream of Frogs (1965), featuring a languorous nude female reclining above three laughing pink frogs; Camel (1966), a horse-headed man and double-humped camel aggressively coupled; and "Gluttony" (1969), which depicted five shapely legs protruding from the bill of a Donald Duck-like character.

In the 1970s, Wesley began to turn toward domestic scenarios that David Pagel later described as "loving dissections of ambiguity and double meaning." In formal terms, these paintings were characterized by a freer use of line, more open compositions, and intensified color palettes dominated by candy pinks, baby blues, flesh beiges and hospital greens; thematically, they often took a farcical, yet incisive look at gender relations, paternal power and mortality. Suzanna and the Lugosis (May I Cut In?) (1972) portrayed a pale, languishing woman in the arms of a tuxedoed, pink vampire, with three identical but paler vampires lining up behind him. In Daddy's Home (1972), Wesley duplicated a gleeful daughter figure five times, the repetition transforming an expression of uncontrollable delight into one that seemed to suggest a demonic grimace and dependence as a weapon. Peter Schjeldahl wrote that this work signaled "a sharp, decidedly eccentric angle of vision" situated "more or less queasily, at some point on the continuum from funny‐ha‐ha to funny‐peculiar."

John Wesley, Utamaro Washing, Bumstead Sleeping, acrylic on canvas, 62" x 43", 2003.

=== Later work ===
Around 1973, Wesley began a long engagement (extending into the 2000s) with popular 1950s characters from comic strips such as Blondie, Popeye and Dennis the Menace. A particular preoccupation was the cowlicked, Chic Young character Dagwood Bumstead, from Blondie, who critics such as Linda Norden wrote, functioned as a stand-in for Wesley's missing father, allowing him to access the people, domestic spaces and pathos of his childhood. He placed these comics characters in ambiguous, often-primal and darkly humorous scenarios through which he explored eroticism, frustration, terror, despair or violence within mundane, everyday life.

Representative early comics-based works included Olive Oyl (1973), which presented that character nude, slumbering and floating with four angry, pointing infant Swee'Pea characters straddling her; Popeye (1973), a gun-wielding boy kidnapping a helpless Wimpy; and The Bumsteads (1974), which depicted Blondie sprawled across a bed, face-down and crying, bent-legged and bottomless, her foot partially covering Dagwood's face, as he leaned over from behind, his next move unclear. Wesley's later "Bumstead" paintings "fixed on the neurotic, erotically inclined psyche of the American male," examining themes of insatiable desire and frustration, inadequacy and mediocrity, rage, longing and loss. He reversed conventional gender roles in paintings like Off His Feed (1991), portraying a nude, possibly impotent Dagwood lying passive while an attentive Blondie tickled his toes; in Bumstead, Maddened by the Mistral, Fighting for His Knife (1990), two Dagwoods struggled over a murder weapon, while in Bumstead in Bedlam (1991) Wesley's Dagwood appeared in a straitjacket. In the 2000s, he added a new twist to the Dagwood works, incorporating a female character that paid homage to the Japanese ukiyo-e genre and eighteenth-century master, Kitagawa Utamaro, in paintings that explored shared erotic preoccupations, such as Utamaro Nude, Bumstead Nude and Utamaro Washing, Bumstead Sleeping (both 2003).

John Wesley, Untitled (Horses and Clouds), acrylic on canvas, 65" x 71", 1988.

Throughout the latter half of his career, Wesley continued to refine his approach, balancing concision and directness with emotional complexity and offbeat subject matter. His work in the 1980s often foregrounded formal concerns through frieze-like arrays of repeated nudes (e.g., Hips, 1984) or animals in decorative, wallpaper-like arrangements (e.g. Untitled (Horse and Clouds), 1988). A series in the 1990s employed nude women—often radically cropped with their faces out of view or eyes closed—variously cooing down at viewers (as if seen from a suckling infant's perspective), floating as enveloping, oceanic bodies, or lying prone and vulnerable in the throes of ecstasy. Jenifer Borum described these later paintings as conflating "the maternal and the erotic, effectively underscoring the infantile nature of the media's obsessional fragmentation and objectification of women." Unlike the ads, she noted, "For Wesley, the personal and the social are inseparable." David Pagel identified a new level of tenderness and vulnerability in Wesley's large acrylics of the 2000s. Dominated by expanses of flesh against blue sky, works such as Smooch (2003) depicted men and women in tight close-ups of heads, necks, shoulders and hands and seemed to suggest intense moments, memories or daydreams of intimacy.

== Personal life and death ==
Wesley married his first wife, Alice Richter, in 1947. They had two children, a daughter, Christine Knox, and a son, Ner Wesley. After their divorce, he married the minimalist painter Jo Baer in 1959 and moved with her from Los Angeles to New York. In 1970, they divorced and in 1971 he married the novelist Hannah Green, remaining with her until her death in 1996. The playwright and painter Patricia Broderick, who died in 2003, was his partner for the last six years of her life.

Wesley died at his home in Manhattan, on February 10, 2022, at the age of 93.

== Public collections and recognition ==
Wesley's work belongs to numerous permanent collections, including those of the Albright-Knox Art Gallery, Blanton Museum of Art, Chinati Foundation, Denver Art Museum, Detroit Institute of Arts, Harvard Art Museums, Hirshhorn Museum, Memphis Brooks Museum of Art, Museum Ludwig (Germany), Museum of Modern Art, Museum of Contemporary Art, Los Angeles, Portland Art Museum, Rose Art Museum, Seattle Art Museum, Stedelijk Museum (Amsterdam), Whitney Museum, and Wadsworth Atheneum.

He was recognized with a Guggenheim Fellowship in 1976, and awards from the National Endowment for the Arts and American Academy of Arts and Letters, among others.
