= I Had Seen Castles =

1993 novella for young adults by Cynthia Rylant

- Author: Cynthia Rylant
- Language: English
- Genre: Novel
- Publisher: Harcourt, Brace & Company
- Publication date: 1993
- Publication place: United States
- Media type: Print (Hardback
- Pages: 97 pp
- ISBN: 0-15-238003-5
- OCLC: 27434463
- LC Class: PZ7.R982 Iad 1993

I Had Seen Castles is a 1993 novella for young adults written by the American writer and Newbery Medalist Cynthia Rylant.

== Plot summary ==
It is a story about a young American named John Dante who enthusiastically enlists in 1942 but soon comes to understand the horrors of war.

It can be deemed as an anti-war novel due to Rylants way of describing the War and its consequences.

== Reviews ==
"The volume is deceptively slim; this finely drawn novel projects emotional truths to rival those of Remarque's All Quiet on the Western Front."
