= Diane Goode =

American children's book author and illustrator

- Born: January 14, 1949 (age 77)
- Education: Queens College, CUNY
- Occupations: Children's book author, illustrator
- Years active: 1978–present

Diane Goode (born January 14, 1949) is an American children's book author and illustrator. She has written several children's books and illustrated over 60, including New York Times bestsellers Founding Mothers and Ladies of Liberty and the Caldecott Honor Book When I Was Young in the Mountains (1982). Goode lives in Brooklyn, New York.

== Early life ==
Goode's mother was French and recited traditional children's stories from memory when Goode was a child. Goode enjoyed reading as a child, particularly works by Jane Austen and Wuthering Heights. She majored in Fine Arts at Queens College.

== Career ==
Before Goode supported herself as an illustrator, she worked for one year in New York City as a substitute teacher. Her first illustrated book was The Little Pieces of the West Wind in 1978, and the first book she authored was I Hear a Noise. Reviewing Goode's illustrations in Thanksgiving Is Here! (2003), the New York Times said that "Diane Goode's pen-and-ink drawings spin out like ragtime, each squiggle denoting a rustle of silk or a whoop or whisper."

Goode produced new illustrations for a reissue of Noel Streatfeild's classic children's story Ballet Shoes in 1991. In 1994, Goode published Diane Goode's Book of Scary Stories and Songs. Goode has collaborated with journalist Cokie Roberts twice, illustrating the bestsellers Founding Mothers (2014) and Ladies of Liberty (2008).

Goode has taught book illustration at the University of California, Los Angeles.

== Artistic style ==
Goode creates her illustrations by hand rather than with a computer. She has three studios in her home, which she uses for different stages of a project.

Goode's artistic process changes for each project. For Founding Mothers, Goode worked on heavy water color paper, creating an outline in sepia ink, and then applying pastels with small, soft sponges and a tiny brush. For Ninja Baby she used watercolor on rough paper. Illustrations in The Best Mother combine pen illustration and watercolor.

== Awards and exhibitions ==
Goode has been awarded the Caldecott Honor.

== Personal life ==
Goode is married and has a son and two dogs.
