= Hannah Green (author) =

American author

Hannah Green (1927–1996) was an American author, born in Cincinnati, Ohio and lived on Barrow Street, in Greenwich Village, New York. As an undergraduate at Wellesley, she enrolled in Vladimir Nabokov's survey of Russian literature in translation, which she later wrote about in The New Yorker. Ms. Green completed her MFA at Stanford University with Wallace Stegner. There she met Tillie Olsen, and the two began a lifelong friendship. In 1960, she was a recipient of the first of many MacDowell Colony residencies. Among her published work are articles in The New Yorker, the books The Dead of the House (1973) and Golden Spark, Little Saint: My Book of the Hours of Saint Foy (2000), and the children's book In the City of Paris. For several years, Ms. Green taught in the writing programs of Stanford, Columbia, and New York University. Until her death in 1996, she was married to the American artist John Wesley.
