= The Islander (Rylant novel) =

1998 novel by Cynthia Rylant

- First edition
- Author: Cynthia Rylant
- Publisher: Dorling Kindersley
- Publication date: March 1, 1998
- ISBN: 0-7894-2490-8

The Islander is a novel written by American author Cynthia Rylant, published in 1998 by Dorling Kindersley.

== Plot summary ==
The book follows Daniel, whose parents have died; he goes to live with his grandfather on a remote gray island off British Columbia. Together they live an extremely lonely life, hardly talking to anyone. That loneliness soon lifts from Daniel when he meets a mermaid. He returns to the shore later, hoping to meet her again, but instead finds a sea otter, who then tosses him a seashell which contains a key. As he explores the mysteries of the key he soon grows closer with his grandfather.
