= Every Living Thing (short story collection) =

First edition

Every Living Thing is a collection of twelve short stories for children by Cynthia Rylant, published by Bradbury Press in 1985 with decorations by S. D. Schindler. The stories all feature redemptive relationships between humans and other animals, most often showing how a stray animal comes into the life of a person just when it is most needed.

== Contents ==
- "Slower Than the Rest", about a boy and his turtle. main character- Leo
- "Retired", about a retired teacher adopting an old collie. main character- Ms. Cutcheon
- "Boar Out There", about a girl's encounter with a wild boar
- "Papa's Parrot", about a boy's learning his father's secret
- "A Pet", about a girl given an old blind goldfish
- "Spaghetti" is about a boy named Gabriel that is lonely and found a cat that gave him company
- "Drying Out", about an alcoholic feeding squirrels in a hospital
- "Stray", about a girl hoping to save her dog from the pound
- "Planting Things", about an elderly man finding a robin's nest
- "A Bad Road for Cats", about a woman searching for her lost cat
- "Safe", about a boy who finds solace in the stolidity of cattle
- "Shells", about an orphan and his aunt finally connecting through hermit crabs
