= Ginger Wadsworth =

American writer

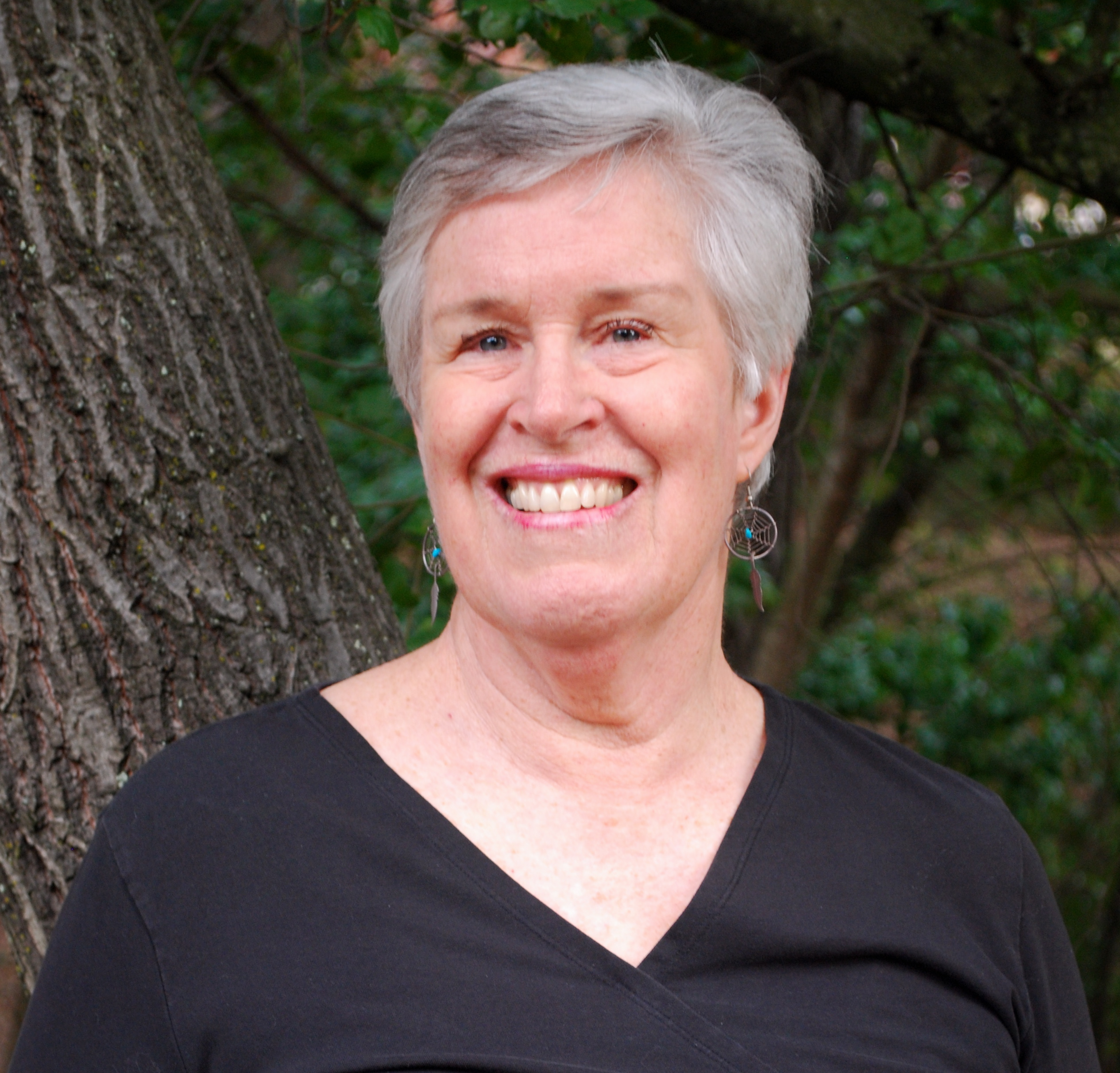
- Wadsworth in 2012
- Born: Virginia Leland Evarts; San Diego, California, USA
- Occupation: Writer
- Writing career
- Period: 1980s–present
- Genres: Biography, Western American history, science, natural history, children's literature
- Notable awards: Western Writers of America Spur Award; 2004, 2014 and 2017
- Website: gingerwadsworth.com

Virginia "Ginger" Wadsworth is an American writer of biographies, Western American history, science, and natural history for young readers. She is the author of 30 award-winning books.

== Early life ==
Virginia Leland Evarts was born in San Diego to Dorothea Abbott Evarts, an artist and teacher, and Hal G. Evarts Jr., an author of many western books, stories for the Saturday Evening Post, biographies, and adventure titles for young readers. Her maternal grandfather, Clinton Gilbert Abbott, was the director of the San Diego Natural History Museum and her paternal grandfather, Hal G. Evarts, was an author of western novels in the 1920s and 1930s.

She and her two younger brothers camped with their family in Anza-Borrego Desert State Park, explored Baja California, and traveled throughout the Western United States while their father conducted research for his writing. She spent three summers on a ranch and made a six-week bicycle trip from San Diego to Canada with her Girl Scout troop.

Wadsworth graduated from La Jolla High School, and attended the University of California Davis where she graduated with an English degree and minor in Western American History.

== Personal life ==
In 1967, she married Bill Wadsworth. They have two sons and three grandchildren. Wadsworth and her husband live in the San Francisco East Bay area.

Wadsworth takes her trained therapy dogs into libraries and schools where children (mostly reluctant readers) read to the dogs in Paws to Read programs. She and her dogs are affiliated with Tony La Russa's Animal Rescue Foundation (ARF) and they also visit Alzheimer respite care facilities.

== Career ==
Wadsworth started writing journals and short stories at a young age. When her children were in elementary school, she began submitting articles to magazines, including Cobblestone (magazine), and had many articles published. Some of her biographies were expansions of those published articles.

Her first published book was a 1990 biography of Julia Morgan, a California architect and first woman to win the American Institute of Architects' AIA Gold Medal. John Muir, Rachel Carson, John Burroughs, and Laura Ingalls Wilder were among her early biography subjects. She wrote about Susan Butcher and her dogs who won the Iditarod Trail Sled Dog Race in Alaska four times. She then wrote a series about animal habitats and another about animal homes. More biographies followed, including ones about Annie Oakley, Benjamin Banneker, Cesar Chavez, and the Wright Brothers. Wadsworth's more recent books include the true story of John Muir and Theodore Roosevelt camping together in Yosemite in 1903, a biography of Juliette Gordon Low the founder of Girl Scouts of the USA, plus two picture books set in Yosemite National Park and a picture book biography of the creator of the Peanuts cartoon strip.

== Published books and key awards/honors ==
Many of Wadsworth's books have been named to recommended book lists compiled by Social Studies Librarians International, Smithsonian, National Science Teachers Association, Children's Book Council, California Readers, and the Association of Children's Librarians.

=== Biographies ===
- Born to Draw Comics, The Story of Charles Schulz and the Creation of Peanuts, illustrated by Craig Orback
- First Girl Scout, The Life of Juliette Gordon Low (American Library Association Amelia Bloomer List)
- Annie Oakley
- Cesar Chavez, illustrated by Mark Schroder
- Benjamin Banneker, Pioneering Scientist, illustrated by Craig Orback
- The Wright Brothers
- Laura Ingalls Wilder, An On My Own Biography, illustrated by Shelley O. Haas
- Laura Ingalls Wilder, Storyteller of the Prairie
- John Burroughs, the Sage of Slabsides (New York Public Library "Books for the Teenager")
- Susan Butcher, Sled Dog Racer
- John Muir, Wilderness Protector (John Burroughs Association Riverby Award List for Young Readers)
- Rachel Carson, Voice for the Earth
- Julia Morgan, Architect of Dreams

=== Western Americana ===
- Camping with the President, illustrated by Karen Dugan (National Outdoor Book Award and California Reading Association Eureka Award Honor)
- Survival in the Snow, illustrated by Craig Orback
- Words West, Voice of Young Pioneers (Western Writers of America Juvenile Nonfiction Spur Award and Colonial Dames of America Young Reader Award)
- Along the Santa Fe Trail, illustrated by James Watling

=== Science and Natural History ===
- Seasons of the Bear, A Yosemite Story, illustrated by Daniel San Souci (Western Writers of America Storyteller Spur Award)
- Yosemite's Songster, One Coyote's Story, illustrated by Daniel San Souci (Western Writers of America Storyteller Spur Award)
- Up, Up, and Away, illustrated by Patricia Wynne
- Woolly Mammoths, illustrated by Todd Zalewski
- River Discoveries, illustrated by Paul Kratter
- Tundra Discoveries, illustrated by John Carrozza
- Desert Discoveries, illustrated by John Carrozza
- One Tiger Growls, illustrated by James Needham
- One on a Web, illustrated by James Needham
- Giant Sequoia Trees, with photographs by Frank Staub

=== Fiction/Picture Book ===
- Tomorrow is Daddy's Birthday, illustrated by Maxie Chambliss
