= Old Town in the Green Groves =

2002 novel after Laura Ingalls Wilder

- First edition
- Author: Cynthia Rylant
- Language: English
- Series: Little House
- Genre: Family Saga; Western novel
- Publisher: HarperCollins
- Publication date: 2002
- Publication place: United States
- Media type: Print (Paperback)
- Preceded by: On the Banks Of Plum Creek
- Followed by: By The Shores Of Silver Lake

Old Town in the Green Groves, by Cynthia Rylant, is a novel based on some notes left by Laura Ingalls Wilder and a general knowledge about her life and the times. This book is not officially part of the Little House series, but describes a period between the end of On the Banks Of Plum Creek and the early part of By The Shores Of Silver Lake. In the Little House books, which are not strictly autobiographical and include alterations to the actual chronology of events, this period in Wilder's life is abridged and condensed.

This time period includes the birth of Charles Ingalls Jr. on November 1, 1875 in Minnesota. Having endured several years of poor crops and mounting debts in Walnut Grove, the Ingalls family decides to sell their farm and move to Burr Oak, Iowa, where Pa has a job offer to help to run a hotel in town. On the way to Iowa, they stay for some time with relatives in South Troy, Minnesota, where Charles dies at 9 months of age on August 27, 1876. The family proceeds to Burr Oak, where they take up their jobs at the hotel. Grace Ingalls is born in Burr Oak on May 23, 1877. Finally, the Ingalls family recovers enough to move west once more, back to Minnesota, and then on to Dakota Territory, where By the Shores of Silver Lake is largely set.
