= Cynthia Rylant =

American author and librarian (born 1954)

- Born: Cynthia Smith; June 6, 1954 (age 72); Hopewell, West Virginia, U.S.
- Education: Morris Harvey College
- Occupation: Children's author
- Awards: Newbery Medal (1993) Newbery Honor (1987) 2× Caldecott Honor (1983, 1986)

Cynthia Rylant (née Smith; born June 6, 1954) is an American author and librarian. She has written more than 100 children's books including works of fiction (picture books, short stories and novels), nonfiction, and poetry. Several of her books have won awards including her novel Missing May, which won the 1993 Newbery Medal, and A Fine White Dust, which was a 1987 Newbery Honor book. Two of her books are Caldecott Honor Books.

== Early life ==
Rylant was born in Hopewell, West Virginia, the daughter of a U.S. Army veteran, John Tune Smith, and Leatrel Smith née Rylant. She uses her mother's maiden name as part of her pen name. She spent her first four years in Illinois. Her parents separated when she was four years old, and she was sent to live with her mother's parents in Cool Ridge, West Virginia, while her mother attended nursing school and was able to visit her only a few times a year. Growing up in the Appalachian region of the U.S. during the 1960s, Rylant lived in a very depressed economic environment. Her grandparents, extended family and kind local townspeople provided a nurturing, safe environment, while the little girl "waited... until someone could return for me", but they were very poor and lived a rustic life, with no electricity, running water or automobiles. As a result, she never saw children's books as a child, reading mainly comic books and enjoying the outdoors.

Four years later, Cynthia Rylant moved back with her mother, who had left for nearby Beaver, West Virginia. There had been no libraries or bookstores in Cool Ridge, and there were none in Beaver. She never saw her father again, and he died when she was thirteen years old in 1967. She later wrote, "I did not have a chance to know him or to say goodbye to him, and that is all the loss I needed to become a writer." When she was nine years old, she fell in love with Paul McCartney and the Beatles. However, her West Virginia childhood was the major influence on her works, and many of them deal with life in the Appalachian region. As a teenager, she became enchanted with Robert F. Kennedy, whom she met during his presidential campaign. She was deeply affected by his assassination. Also important to her emotional development was her relationship with a boy from school.

Cynthia Rylant received a B.A. degree from Morris Harvey College (now the University of Charleston) in 1975 and a M.A. degree from Marshall University in Huntington, West Virginia in 1976, discovering and studying English literature and greatly enjoying her years in school. In 1977, she married Kevin Dolin. Unable to find a job in her field after completing college, she first worked as a waitress and later as a librarian at the Cabell County Public Library in Huntington, where she finally became acquainted with children's books. She taught English part-time at Marshall University in 1979 and wrote her first book, When I Was Young in the Mountains, based on her experiences as a young child living in the country with her grandparents. The picture book, which Rylant later said took her an hour to complete, earned an American Book Award in 1982 and was a Caldecott Honor Book. Her marriage with Dolin ended in 1980 and she earned a master's degree in Library Science from Kent State University in 1981. She lived in Kent, Ohio for many years. She also worked as a librarian at the Cincinnati Public Library. She later moved to Akron, Ohio, and worked at the Akron Public Library while teaching English part-time at the University of Akron. During the early 1980s, she was married briefly to a professor at the University of Akron.

== Career and later years ==
Rylant followed her inaugural book with six more picture books based on her childhood experiences. Her 1983 book, Miss Maggie, deals with themes of aging. Her first poetry collection, Waiting to Waltz: A Childhood (1984), was also autobiographical, based on both happy and sad events or on people she knew, drawing universal emotions from the incisive portraits. Rylant became interested in writing poetry when she read some poems by David Huddle in college. She said of his Paper Boy, that the strong characters were "People whose lives are hard but are proud of who and what they are." In 1985, Rylant decided to write full-time. Her first novel, A Blue-eyed Daisy (1985), describes a year in the life of a young girl, including such events as her first kiss and the funeral of a classmate, and her relationship with her father, who, like Rylant's real-life grandfather, is injured in an accident and loses his job. Her 1986 book, The Relatives Came, describes how she slept on the floor when company visited. In the same year, she published one of her most well-received books, A Fine White Dust. The young adult novel portrays a boy who becomes a disciple to a charismatic preacher, leaving his parents and friends. When the preacher runs off with a young woman, the boy, despite his feelings of betrayal, strengthens his faith in God and discovers a more realistic view of human nature. The book was named a Newbery Honor book.

In 1987, Rylant published the first of her popular Henry and Mudge series books, Henry and Mudge: The First Book. In this book for beginning readers, Henry, an only child, forms a deep attachment with a puppy who grows to be an enormous drooling dog, Mudge. When Mudge is lost, Henry is despondent, and when he is recovered, the two are overjoyed. Since then, she has published dozens more Henry and Mudge books, as well as picture books, books for older readers, including young adult novels and story collections, and collections of poetry. Her critically praised 2004 picture book, Long Night Moon, describes the different moons that Native American cultures use to mark the changing seasons. 1995's The Van Gogh Cafe is one of the author's favorites. Her books often deal with the joys and hardships of family life, with animals and the outdoors, especially in the Appalachian region, and her characters are often loners or people facing hardships. Her 1991 non-fiction picture book for older readers, Appalachia; The Voices of Sleeping Birds, is a vivid picture of life in Appalachia and the warmth of its people.

Rylant's 1992 young adult novel, Missing May, is a touching story about a girl who lives with relatives after the death of her mother and who must comfort her uncle after the death of his beloved wife. Beginning in the early 1990s, Rylant has published several series designed for younger readers, including the Lighthouse Family, High-rise Private Eyes, and Everyday Books series, the last of which is a series for very young children that she illustrated herself. She also illustrated several of her other books, including the playful Dog Heaven (1995), about an ideal dog afterlife. Other poetry collections have been God Went to Beauty School (2003) and Boris (2005).

== Personal life ==
For a time she was in a relationship with Dav Pilkey, author of Captain Underpants. In 1993, Rylant moved to Eugene, Oregon, with her son from her first marriage and in 2003 they left for Portland, Oregon.

== Honors ==
Rylant has received a number of awards and honors for her work. A Fine White Dust (1987) won a Newbery Honor, and Missing May (1993) won a Newbery Medal. When I Was Young in the Mountains (1982) and The Relatives Came (1985) received Caldecott Honors. The Relatives Came and Appalachia: The Voices of Sleeping Birds (1991) are each Boston Globe/Horn Book Honor Books, as is Missing May, which deals with the loss of a loved one. A Kindness (1988), Soda Jerk (1990), and A Couple of Kooks and Other Stories about Love (1990) have each been named a "Best Book of the Year for Young Adults" by the American Library Association.

== Works ==
- 1982 When I Was Young in the Mountains
- 1982 Miss Maggie
- 1983 This Year's Garden
- 1984 Waiting to Waltz....a Childhood (poetry)
- 1985 A Blue-Eyed Daisy (a novel; also published as Some Year for Ellie)
- 1985 Every Living Thing (stories)
- 1985 Stray (short story)
- 1986 A Fine White Dust (novel)
- 1986 Night in the Country
- 1986 The Relatives Came
- 1987 Birthday Presents
- 1987 Children of Christmas: Stories for the Season
- 1988 All I See
- 1988 A Kindness (novel)
- 1989 Mr. Griggs' Work
- 1990 A Couple of Kooks and Other Stories about Love
- 1990 Soda Jerk (poetry)
- 1991 Appalachia: The Voices of Sleeping Birds (nonfiction, Illustrations by Barry Moser)
- 1992 An Angel for Solomon Singer
- 1992 Missing May
- 1992 Best Wishes
- 1993 I Had Seen Castles (novel)
- 1993 The Dreamer
- 1994 The Blue Hill Meadows
- 1994 The Old Woman Who Named Things
- 1994 Something Permanent (poetry)
- 1995 Dog Heaven
- 1995 Gooseberry Park
- 1995 The Van Gogh Cafe
- 1996 The Bookshop Dog (who will care for a dog when her owner becomes ill?)
- 1996 Margaret, Frank, and Andy: Three Writers' Stories, biographical stories (three volumes): A Story of Margaret Wise Brown, A Story of L. Frank Baum, and A Story of E. B. White.
- 1996 The Whales
- 1997 Cat Heaven
- 1997 Silver Packages: An Appalachian Christmas Story (a rich man gives gifts to poor children in Appalachia)
- 1998 Bear Day
- 1998 The Bird House
- 1998 Bless Us All: A Child's Yearbook of Blessings
- 1998 The Islander (novel)
- 1998 Scarecrow
- 1998 Tulip Sees America (a young man and his dog see the farms and mountains of America)
- 1999 Bunny Bungalow
- 1999 The Cookie-Store Cat
- 1999 Give Me Grace: A Child's Daybook of Prayers
- 1999 The Heavenly Village
- 2000 In November
- 2000 Thimbleberry Stories
- 2000 The Wonderful Happens
- 2001 Good Morning, Sweetie Pie and Other Poems for Little Children
- 2001 The Great Gracie Chase
- 2001 Let's Go Home: The Wonderful Things About a House
- 2002 Old Town in the Green Groves
- 2002 The Ticky-Tacky Doll
- 2003 God Went to Beauty School (poetry)
- 2004 Long Night Moon
- 2005 The Stars Will Still Shine
- 2005 Puppies and Piggies
- 2005 Miracles in Motion
- 2005 If You'll Be My Valentine
- 2005 Boris (poetry)
- 2006 Ludie's Life
- 2007 "Alligator Boy"
- 2009 All in a Day
- 2012 " A Crush"
- 2017 Life
- 2018 Rosetown

=== Autobiography ===
- But I'll Be Back Again; An Album (1989) New York: Scholastic
- Something about the Author autobiography series (1994), Vol. 76, Detroit, MI: Gale Research

=== Children's book series ===
Annie and Snowball

- 2007 Book 1: Annie and Snowball and the Dress-up Birthday
- 2007 Book 2: Annie and Snowball and the Prettiest House
- 2008 Book 3: Annie and Snowball and the Teacup Club
- 2008 Book 4: Annie and Snowball and the Pink Surprise
- 2009 Book 5: Annie and Snowball and the Cozy Nest
- 2009 Book 6: Annie and Snowball and the Shining Star
- 2010 Book 7: Annie and Snowball and the Magical House
- 2010 Book 8: Annie and Snowball and the Wintry Freeze
- 2011 Book 9: Annie and Snowball and the Book Bugs Club
- 2011 Book 10: Annie and Snowball and the Thankful Friends
- 2012 Book 11: Annie and Snowball and the Surprise Day
- 2012 Book 12: Annie and Snowball and the Grandmother Night
- 2014 Book 13: Annie and Snowball and the Wedding Day

Cobble Street Cousins

- 1998 In Aunt Lucy's Kitchen
- 1998 A Little Shopping
- 1999 Special Gifts
- 1999 Some Good News
- 2001 Summer Party
- 2002 Wedding Flowers

Everyday

- 1993 Everyday Children
- 1993 Everyday Garden
- 1993 Everyday House
- 1993 Everyday Pets
- 1993 Everyday School
- 1993 Everyday Town
- 1997 An Everyday Book

Henry and Mudge

The High Rise Private Eyes

- The High Rise Private Eyes #1: The Case of the Missing Monkey
- The High Rise Private Eyes #2: The Case of the Climbing Cat
- The High Rise Private Eyes: The Case of the Puzzling Possum
- The High Rise Private Eyes: The Case of the Troublesome Turtle
- The High Rise Private Eyes: The Case of the Sleepy Sloth
- The High Rise Private Eyes: The Case of the Fidgety Fox
- The High Rise Private Eyes: The Case of the Baffled Bear
- The High Rise Private Eyes: The Case of the Desperate Duck

Little Whistle

- 2001 Little Whistle
- 2001 Little Whistle's Dinner Party
- 2002 Little Whistle's Medicine
- 2003 Little Whistle's Christmas

Mr. Putter and Tabby

- 1994 Mr. Putter and Tabby Pour the Tea
- 1994 Mr. Putter and Tabby Walk the Dog
- 1994 Mr. Putter and Tabby Bake the Cake
- 1995 Mr. Putter and Tabby Pick the Pears
- 1997 Mr. Putter and Tabby Fly the Plane
- 1997 Mr. Putter and Tabby Row the Boat
- 1998 Mr. Putter and Tabby Take the Train
- 1998 Mr. Putter and Tabby Toot the Horn
- 2000 Mr. Putter and Tabby Paint the Porch
- 2001 Mr. Putter and Tabby Feed the Fish
- 2002 Mr. Putter and Tabby Catch the Cold
- 2003 Mr. Putter and Tabby Stir the Soup
- 2004 Mr. Putter and Tabby Write the Book
- 2005 Mr. Putter and Tabby Make a Wish
- 2006 Mr. Putter and Tabby Spin the Yarn
- 2007 Mr. Putter and Tabby See the Stars
- 2008 Mr. Putter and Tabby Run the Race
- 2009 Mr. Putter and Tabby Spill the Beans
- 2010 Mr. Putter and Tabby Clear the Decks
- 2011 Mr. Putter and Tabby Ring the Bell
- 2012 Mr. Putter and Tabby Dance the Dance
- 2013 Mr. Putter and Tabby Drop the Ball
- 2014 Mr. Putter and Tabby Turn the Page
- 2015 Mr. Putter and Tabby Smell the Roses
- 2016 Mr. Putter and Tabby Hit the Slope

Poppleton

Main article: Poppleton: The Children's Book

Lighthouse family

- 2002 The Storm
- 2003 The Whale
- 2003 The Eagle
- 2005 The Turtle
- 2005 The Octopus
- 2016 The Otter
- 2017 The Sea Lion
- 2018 The Bear
