= Ingalls House =

Ingalls House may refer to:

- Ingalls House (Mercer, Maine), listed on the NRHP in Maine
- Ingalls House (De Smet, South Dakota), listed on the NRHP in South Dakota
- Ingalls-Wheeler-Horton Homestead Site, Rehoboth, MA, listed on the NRHP in Massachusetts
- Wheeler-Ingalls House, Rehoboth, MA, listed on the NRHP in Massachusetts
- Laura Ingalls Wilder House, Mansfield, MO, listed on the NRHP in Missouri
