= Burke, New York =

- Town
- Location within the state of New York
- Coordinates: 44°55′07″N 74°10′46″W
- Country: United States
- State: New York
- County: Franklin
- Named after: Edmund Burke

Government
  - Type: Town Council
  - Town Supervisor: William Wood (R)
  - Town Council: Members: • James Otis (R); • Arnold Lobdell (R); • Timothy Crippen (R); • Patrick Downing (R)

Area
  - Total: 44.41 sq mi (115.01 km^{2})
  - Land: 44.41 sq mi (115.01 km^{2})
  - Water: 0 sq mi (0.00 km^{2})
- Elevation: 726 ft (221 m)

Population (2010)
  - Total: 1,465
  - Estimate (2016): 1,473
  - Density: 33.2/sq mi (12.81/km^{2})
- Time zone: UTC-5 (Eastern (EST))
  - Summer (DST): UTC-4 (EDT)
- ZIP Codes: 12917 (Burke); 12953 (Malone); 12920 (Chateaugay)
- Area code: 518
- FIPS code: 36-033-11165
- GNIS feature ID: 978765
- Website: www.burkeny.org

Burke is a town in Franklin County, New York, United States. The population was 1,421 at the 2020 census, down from 1,465 at the 2010 census. The town is in the northeastern part of the county, northeast of Malone, the county seat.

The town contains a village also named Burke.

== History ==
The town was first settled prior to 1800. The area was known as "West Chateaugay," and was proposed to be the town of "Birney," but the name "Burke" was selected instead, presumably for Edmund Burke, the British statesman. The town of Burke was formed in 1844 from the town of Chateaugay.

Almanzo Wilder, often thought to be a native of nearby Malone, actually grew up on a farm in Burke. He was the husband of Little House on the Prairie author Laura Ingalls Wilder, who told his story in the novel Farmer Boy. The son of James and Angeline Day Wilder, he was born on his family's farm on February 13, 1857. In 1875, the family left to settle in Minnesota.

== Geography ==
Burke is located in northeastern Franklin County. The northern town line is Canada–United States border, with the province of Quebec to the north. Neighboring New York towns are Constable to the west, Malone to the southwest, Bellmont to the south, and Chateaugay to the east. According to the United States Census Bureau, the town has a total area of 44.4 square miles (115.0 km^{2}), all land.

U.S. Route 11 is an important east-west highway across the central part of the town.

The Little Trout River flows from southeast to northwest past several communities in the town. It is part of the Trout River watershed, which flows north to the Chateauguay River in Quebec and ultimately the St. Lawrence River.

== Demographics ==
Historical population
Census	Pop.	Note	%±
1850	2,477		—
1860	2,240		−9.6%
1870	2,141		−4.4%
1880	2,161		0.9%
1890	2,072		−4.1%
1900	1,936		−6.6%
1910	1,772		−8.5%
1920	1,578		−10.9%
1930	1,512		−4.2%
1940	1,414		−6.5%
1950	1,348		−4.7%
1960	1,475		9.4%
1970	1,257		−14.8%
1980	1,237		−1.6%
1990	1,231		−0.5%
2000	1,359		10.4%
2010	1,465		7.8%
2016 (est.)	1,473	▲	0.5%
U.S. Decennial Census

As of the census of 2000, there were 1,359 people, 483 households, and 364 families residing in the town. The population density was 30.6 inhabitants per square mile (11.8/km^{2}). There were 542 housing units at an average density of 12.2 per square mile (4.7/km^{2}). The racial makeup of the town was 97.20% White, 0.52% Black or African American, 1.03% Native American, 0.37% from other races, and 0.88% from two or more races. Hispanic or Latino of any race were 0.81% of the population.

There were 483 households, out of which 35.8% had children under the age of 18 living with them, 62.9% were married couples living together, 7.0% had a female householder with no husband present, and 24.6% were non-families. 17.8% of all households were made up of individuals, and 7.5% had someone living alone who was 65 years of age or older. The average household size was 2.78 and the average family size was 3.12.

In the town, the population was spread out, with 29.0% under the age of 18, 6.4% from 18 to 24, 29.6% from 25 to 44, 22.7% from 45 to 64, and 12.3% who were 65 years of age or older. The median age was 36 years. For every 100 females, there were 105.9 males. For every 100 females age 18 and over, there were 103.2 males.

The median income for a household in the town was $34,318, and the median income for a family was $36,477. Males had a median income of $28,295 versus $22,679 for females. The per capita income for the town was $14,434. About 12.6% of families and 16.4% of the population were below the poverty line, including 20.4% of those under age 18 and 21.9% of those age 65 or over.

== Communities and locations in Burke ==
- Brayton Hollow – A location near the northern town line, north of US-11.
- Burke – The Village of Burke, south of US-11 at the junction of County Roads 23 and 36.
- Burke Center – A hamlet on US-11 and north of Burke village on County Road 34.
- Chateaugay Chasm – A location at the eastern town line.
- Cooks Mill – A hamlet by the eastern town boundary.
- Coveytown Corners – A location west of Sun and north of Burke Center.
- North Burke – A hamlet near the northern town line on County Road 29. It is a port of entry between the USA and Canada.
- Sun – A hamlet north of Burke Center.
- Thayer Corners – A hamlet east of Burke Center on US-11, near the eastern town line.

== Notable people ==
- Helena Smith Dayton (animated film pioneer), born in Burke.
- Almanzo Wilder, American farmer as well as the husband of Laura Ingalls Wilder and the father of Rose Wilder Lane.
