= Prairie Museum =

Prairie Museum may refer to:

in Canada

- Grande Prairie Museum, Grande Prairie, Alberta, museum in Grande Prairie
- Living Prairie Museum, Winnipeg, Manitoba, includes 30 acres (12 ha) preserved tall grass prairie
- Prairie River Museum, Prairie River, Porcupine No. 395, Saskatchewan

in the United States

- Museum of the Grand Prairie in the village of Mahomet, Illinois
- Conner Prairie: Indiana's Living History Museum, Hamilton County, Indiana
- Sheldon Prairie Museum, Sheldon, Iowa
- Prairie Museum of Art and History, Colby, Kansas
- Stuhr Museum of the Prairie Pioneer, in Grand Island, Nebraska
- Hastings Prairie Museum, Hastings, Nebraska
- Nebraska Prairie Museum, Holdrege, Nebraska
- Dacotah Prairie Museum, Aberdeen, South Dakota

== See also ==
- Little House on the Prairie Museum, Independence, Kansas
- Breaking the Prairie Museum, Mendota, Illinois
- Prairie Elevator Museum, Acadia Valley, Alberta
