= Laura Ingalls Wilder House =

Historic house in Missouri, United States

- U.S. National Register of Historic Places
- U.S. National Historic Landmark
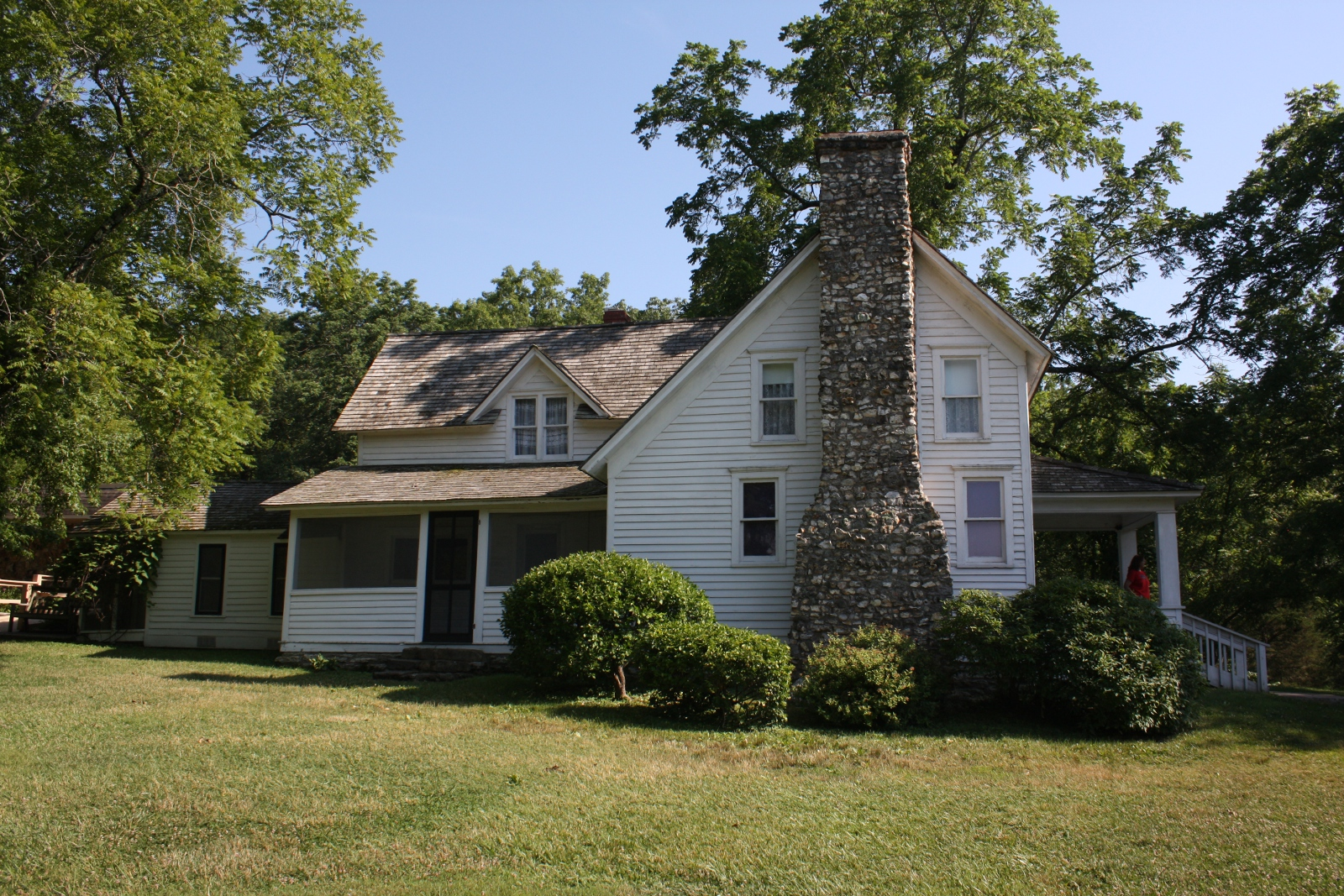

- Location within Missouri Location within the United States
- Location: 3060 Highway A, Mansfield, Missouri
- Coordinates: 37°5′58″N 92°33′22″W
- Built: 1895
- Architect: Almanzo Wilder
- Architectural style: Bungalow/Craftsman
- NRHP reference No.: 70000353

Significant dates
- Added to NRHP: May 19, 1970
- Designated NHL: July 17, 1991

The Laura Ingalls Wilder House is a historic house museum at 3060 Highway A in Mansfield, Missouri. Also known as Rocky Ridge Farm, it was the home of author Laura Ingalls Wilder from 1896 until her death in 1957. The author of the Little House on the Prairie series, Wilder began writing the series while living there. The house, together with the nearby Rock Cottage on the same property, represents one of the few surviving places where she resided. Shortly after her death local residents initiated legal steps to acquire the house through the incorporation of a non-profit organization to preserve her legacy. Owned by the Laura Ingalls Wilder Home Association, the house is open to the public for tours. It was designated a National Historic Landmark in 1991.

== History ==
in 1894 Laura and Almanzo Wilder paid a $100 down payment on 40 acres (16 ha) of farmland. They named their home "Rocky Ridge." Two rooms of the house were initially built between 1895 and 1897. Further additions through 1912 brought the house to its present form with ten rooms. Most of the work was done by Almanzo, with help from local carpenters and from Laura, using local materials.

The house is now a museum devoted to Laura and her writings. It was placed on the National Register of Historic Places on May 19, 1970, and was designated a National Historic Landmark on July 17, 1991. The Rock House is located nearby on the same property. Laura began to write at the age of 65 in there. It is part of the Wilder Museum, but is not included in the National Historic Landmark designation.

== Description ==
The Wilder house is an irregularly-shaped wood-frame structure, typically 1 1/2 stories in height with a raised attic section that approaches two stories in places. The original kitchen and one other room are one story. It has several porches. Dormers and gable windows provide light and air to the upper level. There are six rooms on the main level, and three on the upper level.

== Rock House ==
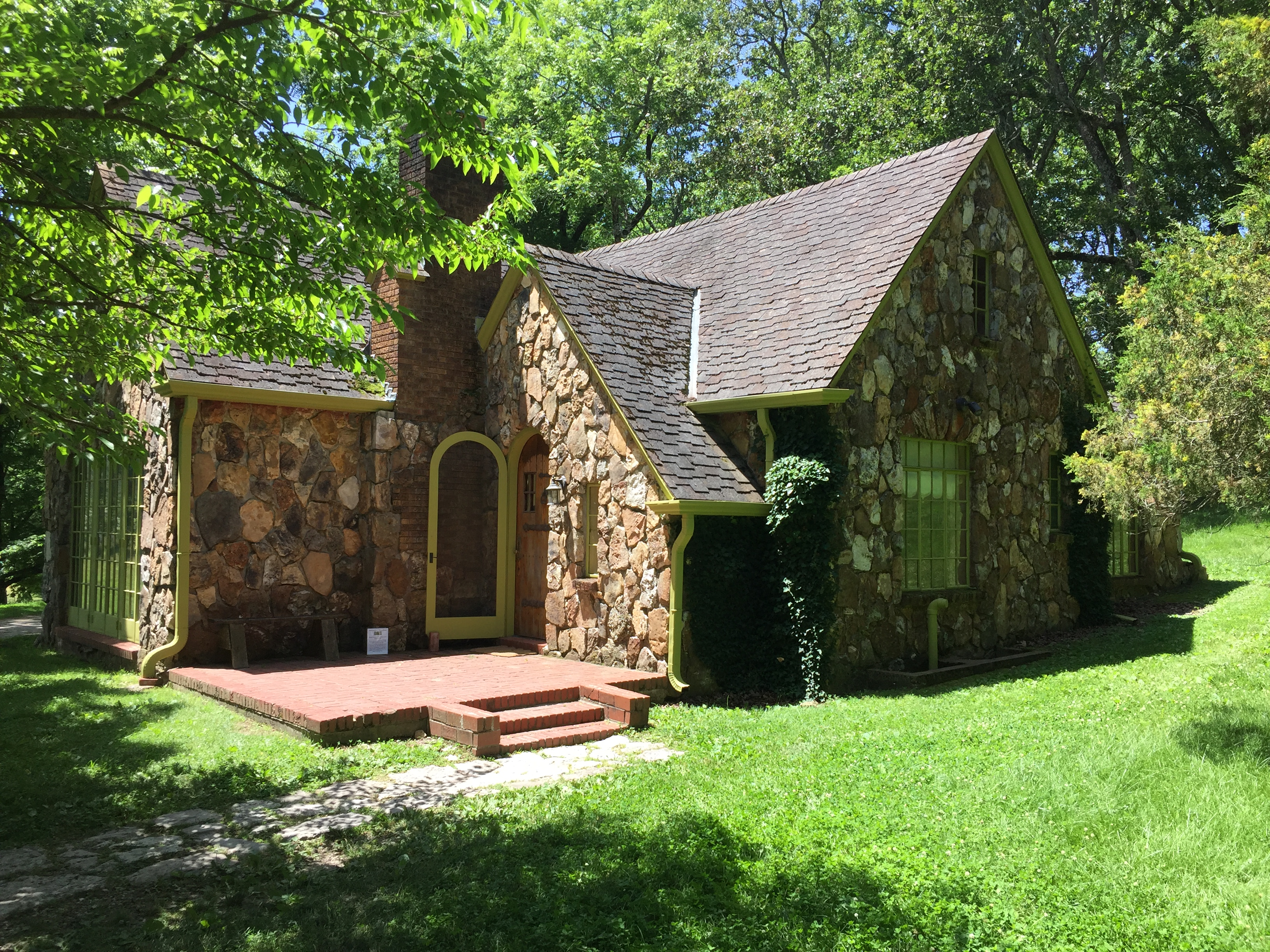
Rock House in 2022

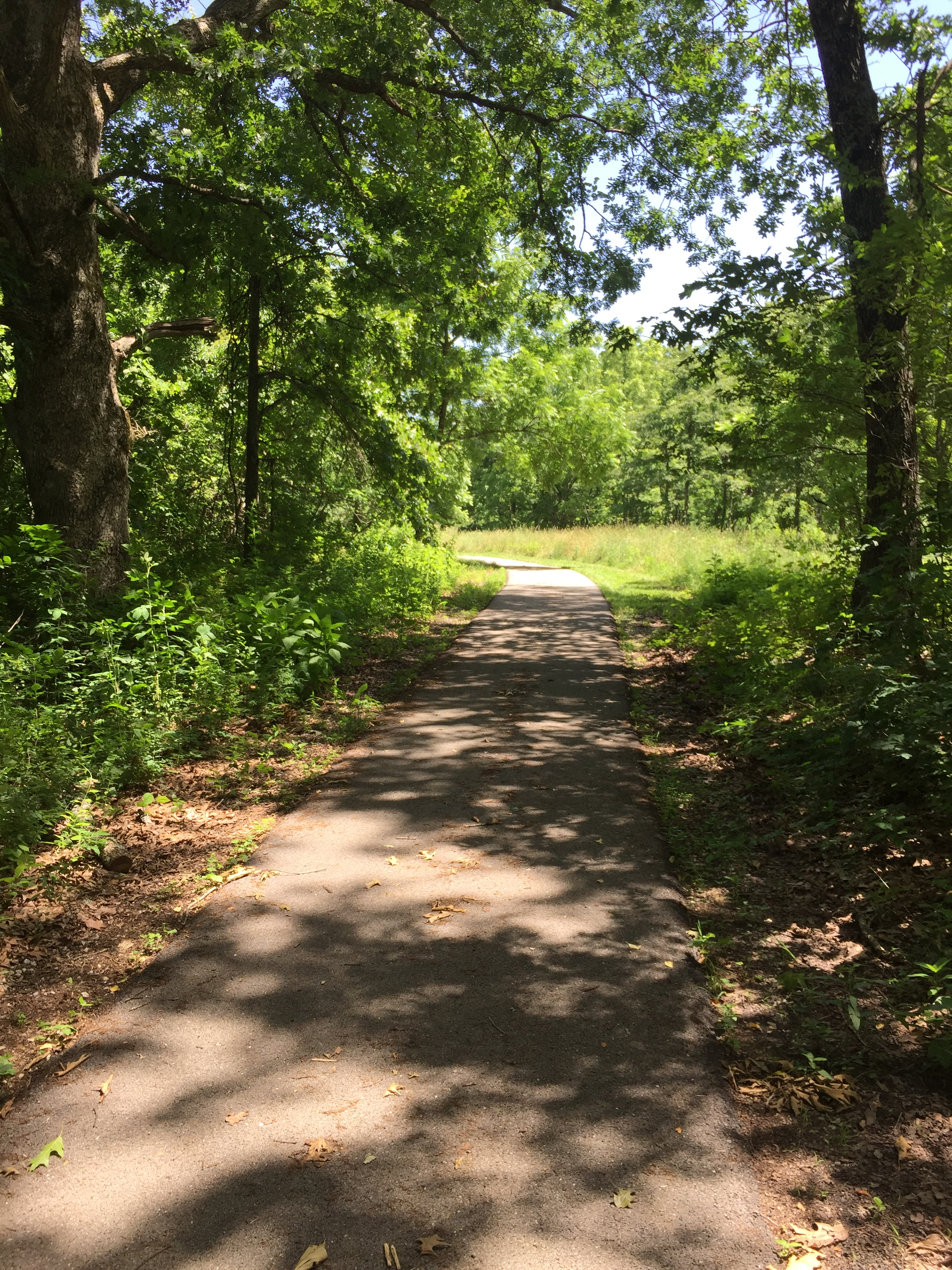
Pathway

Rock House, sometimes referred to as Rock Cottage, was built in 1928, by their daughter Rose Wilder Lane as a gift to her parents. Laura and Almanzo lived at Rock House from 1928 to 1936, then they returned to the farmhouse. In the Rock House, Laura, at 65 years old, wrote the first four Little House books.

Rose hired architect Eugene Johnston to customize a The Mitchell, an English-style two-bedroom cottage from the Sears Modern Homes catalog. Rose paid for a electrical power line from Mansfield’s electric source. Rose also paid for private phone lines to the farmhouse and to the Rock House.

Rose occupied the farmhouse from 1928 to 1936. After Rose moved to Connecticut, Laura and Almanzo returned to the farmhouse, which was now wired for electricity.

After Laura’s death, the Rock House and 50 acres of the Wilders' original farm were sold. In the early 1990s, the Laura Ingalls Wilder Historic Home and Museum bought back the home and acreage. By 1995, the home was fully restored.

Location

Across the ridge from the farmhouse, Rock House is on a pathway that leads from the main house, about 1/3 miles long. The Rock House is also accessible by a separate parking area.

== See also ==
- Ingalls House (De Smet, South Dakota)
- Little House Wayside, her birth site in Wisconsin with replica of "Little House in the Big Woods"
- Little House on the Prairie Museum, Independence, Kansas, with replica cabin on site of homestead
- List of residences of American writers
