= Burke (village), New York =

Burke, New York
- Village
- Location within the state of New York
- Coordinates: 44°54′4″N 74°10′14″W
- Country: United States
- State: New York
- County: Franklin
- Town: Burke
- Named for: Edmund Burke

Government
  - Type: Village Board of Trustees
  - Mayor: Greg Perrigo
  - Trustee: Craig Dumas
  - Trustee: Gary Lewis

Area
  - Total: 0.29 sq mi (0.75 km^{2})
  - Land: 0.29 sq mi (0.75 km^{2})
  - Water: 0 sq mi (0.00 km^{2})
- Elevation: 863 ft (263 m)

Population (2020)
  - Total: 160
  - Density: 549.1/sq mi (212.02/km^{2})
- Time zone: UTC-5 (Eastern (EST))
  - Summer (DST): UTC-4 (EDT)
- ZIP code: 12917
- Area code: 518
- FIPS code: 36-11154
- GNIS feature ID: 0969931

Burke is a village in Franklin County, New York, United States. The population was 211 at the 2010 census. By the 2020 Census, the population had dropped to 160. The village is in the town of Burke and is northeast of Malone, the county seat.

== History ==
The region was known as "West Chateaugay" when the first settlers arrived at the end of the 18th century. The community was once called "The Hollow" and "Andrusville".

The town of Burke is home to the Wilder Farm.

== Geography ==
Burke village is located south of the center of the town of Burke at 44°54′3″N 74°10′13″W (44.90103, -74.170449), in northeastern Franklin County. It is 7 miles (11 km) northeast of Malone and 5 miles (8 km) southwest of Chateaugay.

According to the United States Census Bureau, the village of Burke has a total area of 0.29 square miles (0.75 km^{2}), all land.

The Little Trout River passes through the village, which is south of U.S. Route 11. Via the Trout River and Chateauguay River downstream (to the north), it is part of the St. Lawrence River watershed.

== Demographics ==
Historical population
Census	Pop.	Note	%±
1930	325		—
1940	344		5.8%
1950	316		−8.1%
1960	273		−13.6%
1970	237		−13.2%
1980	226		−4.6%
1990	209		−7.5%
2000	213		1.9%
2010	211		−0.9%
2020	160		−24.2%
U.S. Decennial Census

As of the census of 2000, there were 213 people, 85 households, and 54 families residing in the village. The population density was 729.0 inhabitants per square mile (281.5/km^{2}). There were 94 housing units at an average density of 321.7 per square mile (124.2/km^{2}). The racial makeup of the village was 98.59% White, 0.94% Native American, and 0.47% from two or more races. Hispanic or Latino of any race were 1.41% of the population.

There were 85 households, out of which 24.7% had children under the age of 18 living with them, 49.4% were married couples living together, 9.4% had a female householder with no husband present, and 35.3% were non-families. 30.6% of all households were made up of individuals, and 17.6% had someone living alone who was 65 years of age or older. The average household size was 2.32 and the average family size was 2.82.

In the village, the population was spread out, with 19.7% under the age of 18, 9.4% from 18 to 24, 23.0% from 25 to 44, 24.4% from 45 to 64, and 23.5% who were 65 years of age or older. The median age was 44 years. For every 100 females, there were 95.4 males. For every 100 females age 18 and over, there were 92.1 males.

The median income for a household in the village was $35,714, and the median income for a family was $36,563. Males had a median income of $30,250 versus $31,875 for females. The per capita income for the village was $15,756. About 3.6% of families and 10.1% of the population were below the poverty line, including 3.7% of those under the age of eighteen and 31.6% of those 65 or over.
