= Wilder Homestead =

Historic house in New York, United States

- U.S. National Register of Historic Places
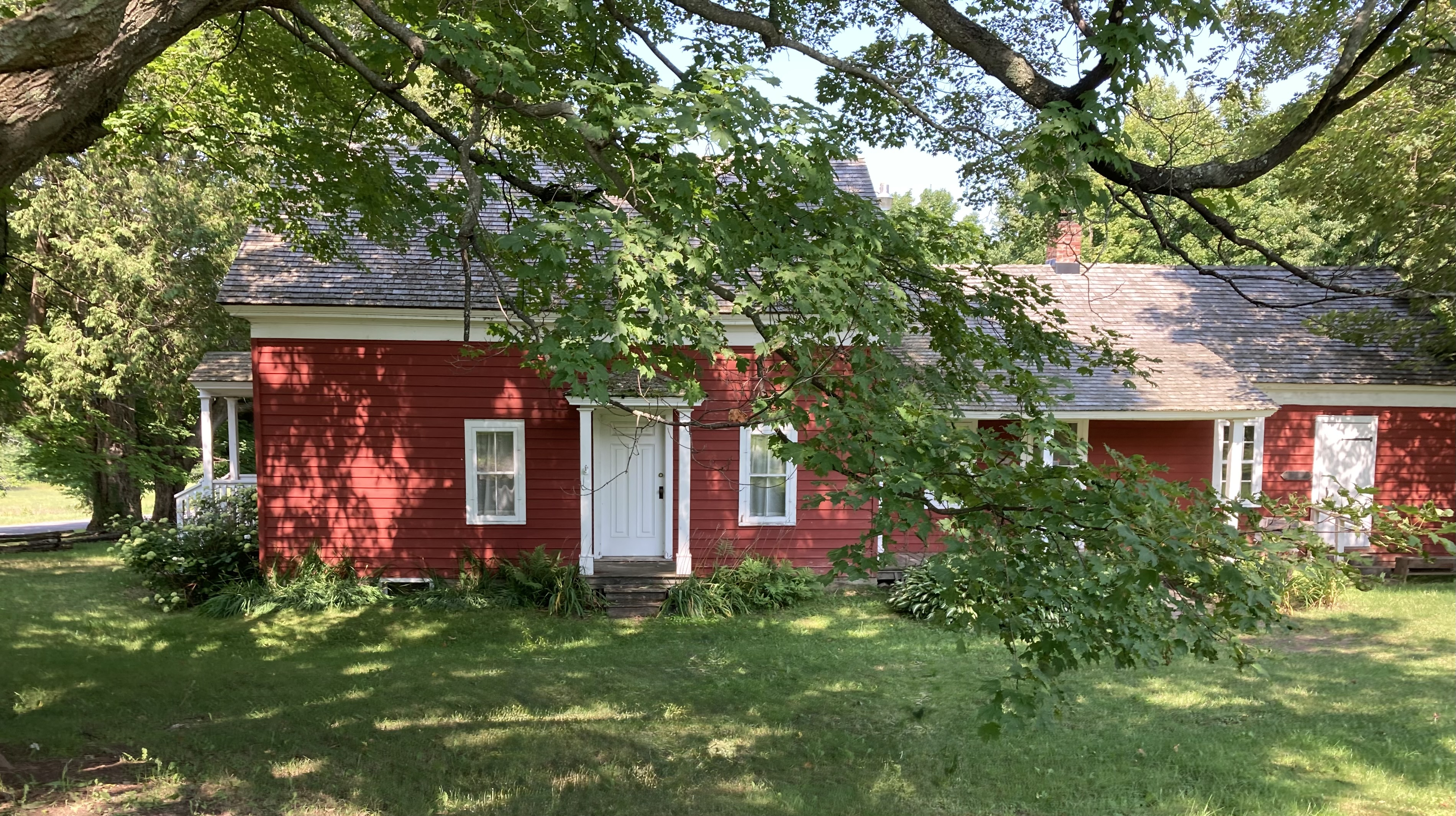
- The Wilder Homestead in 2021

- Location within New York Location within the United States
- Location: 177 Stacy Rd., Burke, New York
- Coordinates: 44°52′05″N 74°12′56″W
- Area: 84 acres (34 ha)
- Built: 1842, 1857, 1866, 1875
- Architectural style: Greek Revival
- NRHP reference No.: 09000720
- Added to NRHP: November 19, 2014

Wilder Homestead, also known as the Boyhood Home of Almanzo Wilder, is a historic home and farmstead in Burke in Franklin County, New York. Wilder was a farmer who married author Laura Ingalls Wilder. The farmhouse was built in 1843, and is a two-story, Greek Revival style frame dwelling. The front facade features a small porch supported by square columns. It has a 1 1/2-story rear block with a small colonnaded portico. The property includes nine reconstructed outbuildings including a visitor center (1989), corn crib (1989), three barns (1995, 1997, 1999), picnic pavilion (1998), rest rooms (1999), pump house (2002), school house. The Wilder family occupied the property until about 1875. The property is operated by the Almanzo & Laura Ingalls Wilder Association as an interactive educational center, museum and working farm as in the time of Almanzo Wilder's childhood as depicted in the Laura Ingalls Wilder book Farmer Boy.

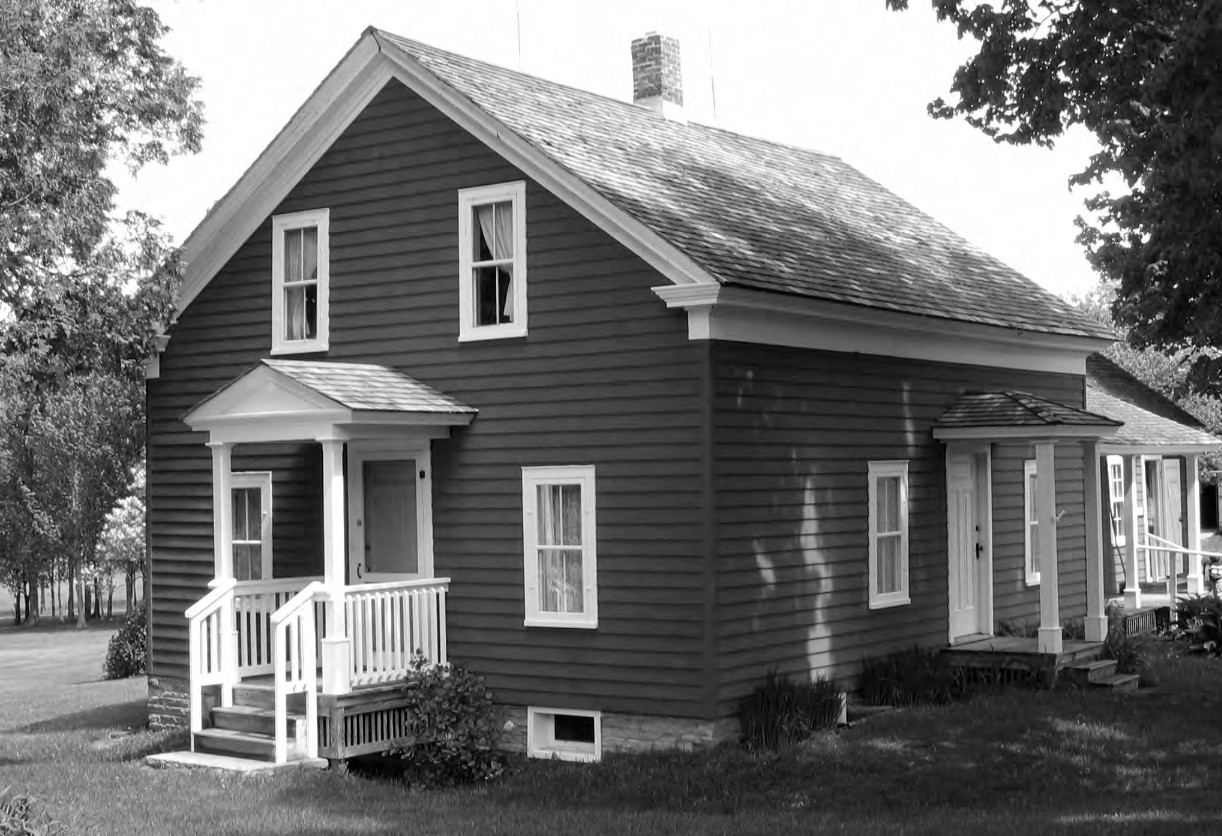
A black and white view of the front of the farmhouse.

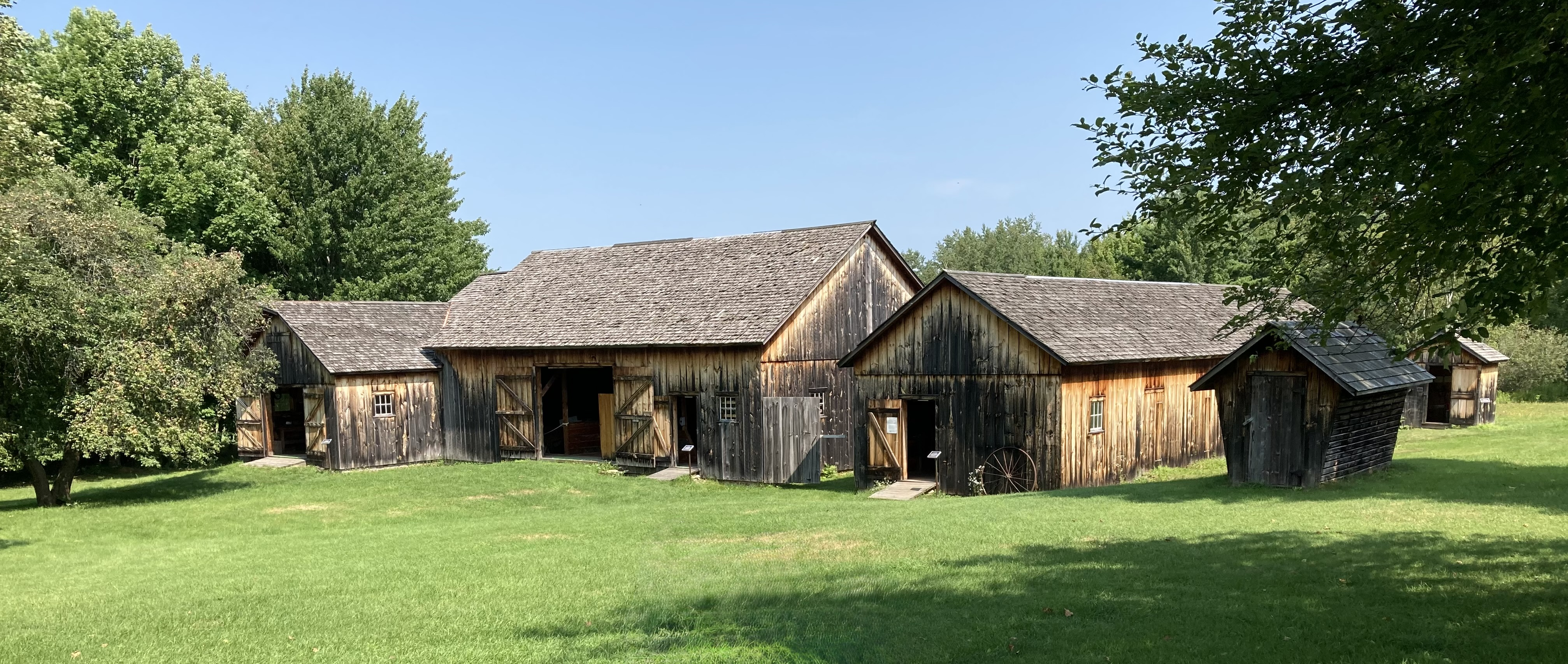
The three-barn complex (reconstructed in the 1990s) at the Amazon Wilder boyhood home in New York.

It was listed on the National Register of Historic Places in 2014.
