= Ingalls–Wheeler–Horton Homestead Site =

Historic house in Massachusetts, United States

- U.S. National Register of Historic Places
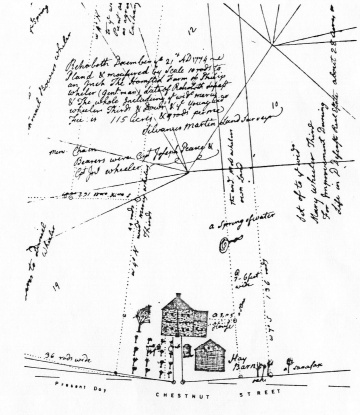
- 1774 survey of the property

- Location within Massachusetts Location within the United States
- Location: Rehoboth, Massachusetts
- Coordinates: 41°49′2″N 71°14′49″W
- Built: 1730
- Architectural style: Greek Revival
- MPS: Rehoboth MRA
- NRHP reference No.: 83000684
- Added to NRHP: June 6, 1983

The Ingalls–Wheeler–Horton Homestead Site is a historic homestead site at 214 Chestnut Street in Rehoboth, Massachusetts.

A house was built c. 1730 on this property, which survived until the early 20th century; a new house was built on the property in 1895, probably on the foundation of an old barn. The site has been listed on the National Register of Historic Places for the archaeological value of the former home site and the remains of associated outbuildings, and because the 1895 house is a fine local example of Late Greek Revival architecture. It remains in private hands.

== See also ==
- National Register of Historic Places listings in Bristol County, Massachusetts
