= Little House on the Prairie Museum =

Historic site where Laura Ingalls Wilder lived in Independence, Kansas, United States

The Little House on the Prairie Museum is a museum on the site of Laura Ingalls Wilder's childhood home. It is located in Independence, Kansas, United States and was established in 1977.

There is a replica of the cabin as described in her books. Other historic buildings have been moved to the site. In 2024, it was one of several sites associated with the Little House on the Prairie television show's 50th anniversary.

== See also ==
- Ingalls House (De Smet, South Dakota)
