= Almanzo Wilder =

American farmer and husband of Laura Ingalls Wilder (1859–1949)

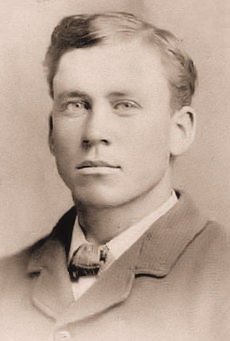
- Wilder c. 1885
- Born: Almanzo James Wilder; February 13, 1859; Burke, New York, U.S.
- Died: October 23, 1949 (aged 90); Mansfield, Missouri, U.S.
- Occupation: Farmer
- Spouse: Laura Ingalls (m. 1885)
- Children: 2, including Rose Wilder Lane

Almanzo James Wilder (February 13, 1859 (Note: Sources differ on Wilder's birth year; see "Early life" section.) – October 23, 1949) was an American farmer who was the husband of Laura Ingalls Wilder and the father of Rose Wilder Lane, both noted authors. A dramatized version of his childhood was portrayed in his wife's novel Farmer Boy.

== Biography ==
=== Early life ===
Wilder was born on his family's homestead in rural Burke, New York, a few miles from the town of Malone. While Wilder gave his birth date as February 13, 1857, federal and New York state census records consistently support a birth year of 1859. In 1879, Wilder likely stated his age as two years older when claiming land in the Dakota Territory under the Homestead Act, which required claimants to be at least 21 years of age. His unusual given name stemmed from family lore, which held that a Wilder's life was saved by an Arab named Almanzor during the Crusades, resulting in a line of sons named for him.

Wilder was the fifth of six children born to farmers James Mason (1813–1899) and Angelina Albina (née Day) Wilder (1821–1905). His siblings included Laura Ann (1844–1899), Royal Gould (1847–1925), Eliza Jane (1850–1930), Alice Maria (1853–1892), and Perley Day Wilder (1869–1934). As part of her Little House series of semi-autobiographical novels, Laura Ingalls Wilder wrote a book titled Farmer Boy about Wilder's childhood in upstate New York; he would subsequently become a recurring character in the later Little House books in which his wife wrote about their courtship and subsequent marriage, in The Long Winter, Little Town on the Prairie, These Happy Golden Years, and The First Four Years, respectively. He also appears briefly in chapter 28 ('Moving Day') of By the Shores of Silver Lake. Almanzo is characterized as a quietly courageous, hardworking man who loves horses and farming, and is also described as an accomplished carpenter and woodworker.

Farmer Boy recounts events of Wilder's childhood, starting when he was weeks shy of his ninth birthday in 1868. Among other things, he begins attending school when not needed at home for farm work, learns to train and drive a team of oxen, attends a county fair, and enjoys a mid-19th century Fourth of July celebration in the town of Malone. Almanzo also learns to deal with being bossed around by his older siblings, particularly his strong-willed sister Eliza Jane, who would later become a schoolteacher of his future wife.

Farmer Boy was the second book published in the Little House series. Hitting bookstore shelves in 1933, it was followed by Little House on the Prairie in 1935. The original order of publication was changed by publisher Harper with the subsequent release of the illustrated 1953 and 1971 editions.

=== Moving to the West ===
The Wilder family left Burke in 1870 due to crop failures. Moving west, they settled in Spring Valley, Minnesota, where they established a farm. In 1879, Wilder, his older brother Royal, and older sister Eliza Jane moved to the Dakota Territory, taking claims near what would later become the town of De Smet, South Dakota. Wilder settled on his homestead with the intent of planting acres of seed wheat which he had cultivated the previous summer on rented shares in Marshall, Minnesota. It was in De Smet that he first met Laura Ingalls. The Ingalls family had been one of the first settlers in the area, before the town was formally organized. They moved to the Dakota Territory from Walnut Grove, Minnesota, when Charles Ingalls took a temporary job with the railroad.

Wilder is portrayed as a hero in his wife's book The Long Winter. Along with Ed "Cap" Garland, Wilder risked his life to save the citizens of De Smet from starvation during the long, hard winter of 1880–81. In between storms of a winter of unusually frequent and severe blizzards, which prevented trains from bringing food and supplies to the town, they went 12 miles (19 km) into the open prairie in search of wheat that a farmer was said to have harvested somewhere to the southwest of De Smet. The two men found the farmer and, after a difficult negotiation, persuaded him to sell them sixty bushels of wheat. Hauling the life-saving grain on sleds that continually broke through the snow into slough grass, they just made it back to De Smet before another four-day blizzard hit the area.

=== Marriage to Laura Ingalls ===
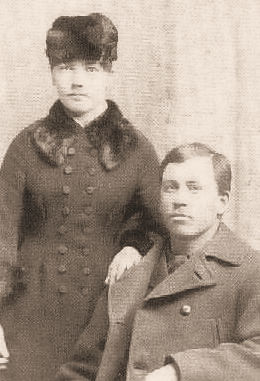
Laura and Almanzo Wilder, circa 1885

When Wilder was 23 years old and Ingalls was 16, the two began courting. Wilder would drive Ingalls back and forth between De Smet and a new settlement 12 miles (19 km) outside town, where she was teaching school and boarding. Then, when spring arrived, the couple would go for long buggy rides. Three years later, on August 25, 1885, Wilder and Ingalls were married in De Smet by the Reverend Edward Brown. They settled on Wilder's claim and began their own small farming operations. The Wilders' daughter, Rose, was born December 5, 1886. Rose Wilder later became known as the author Rose Wilder Lane, a noted political writer and philosopher.

During their first years of marriage, described in The First Four Years, the Wilders were plagued by bad weather, illness, and large debts. In the spring of 1888, Wilder and his wife were both stricken with diphtheria. Although they both survived, Wilder suffered from one of the less common, late complications of the illness, neuritis. Areas of Wilder's legs were temporarily paralyzed, and after the paralysis had resolved, he needed a cane to walk. His inability to perform the hard physical labor associated with wheat farming in South Dakota, combined with a lengthy drought in the late 1880s and early 1890s, further contributed to the Wilders' downward spiral into insolvency.

The year 1889 proved the breaking point for the Wilders. In early August, Laura gave birth to a son. The child remained unnamed when, two weeks later, he suddenly died of "convulsions." Laura Ingalls Wilder never spoke of his death, and the couple did not have any more children.

In the same month, the little family lost their home to a fire and their crops to drought. According to Rose Wilder Lane, "It took seven successive years of complete crop failure, with work, weather and sickness that wrecked his health permanently, and interest rates of 36 percent on money borrowed to buy food, to dislodge us from that land."

In 1890, the Wilder family moved to Spring Valley, Minnesota, to stay with his parents on their farm. It was a time of rest and recovery for the weary family. Between 1891 and 1892, the family again moved, this time to Westville, Florida. They hoped a warmer climate would help Wilder regain his strength. Ultimately, while the warmer temperatures did help him recover, his wife did not like the humid climate or the customs of the backwoods locals.

They returned to De Smet in 1892, and rented a small house in town. Between 1892 and 1894, the Wilders lived in De Smet, with the Ingalls family nearby. Laura Ingalls Wilder worked as a seamstress in a dressmaker's shop, while Wilder found work as a carpenter and day laborer. Together, they practiced frugality and carefully saved their money.

=== Settling in Missouri and later years ===
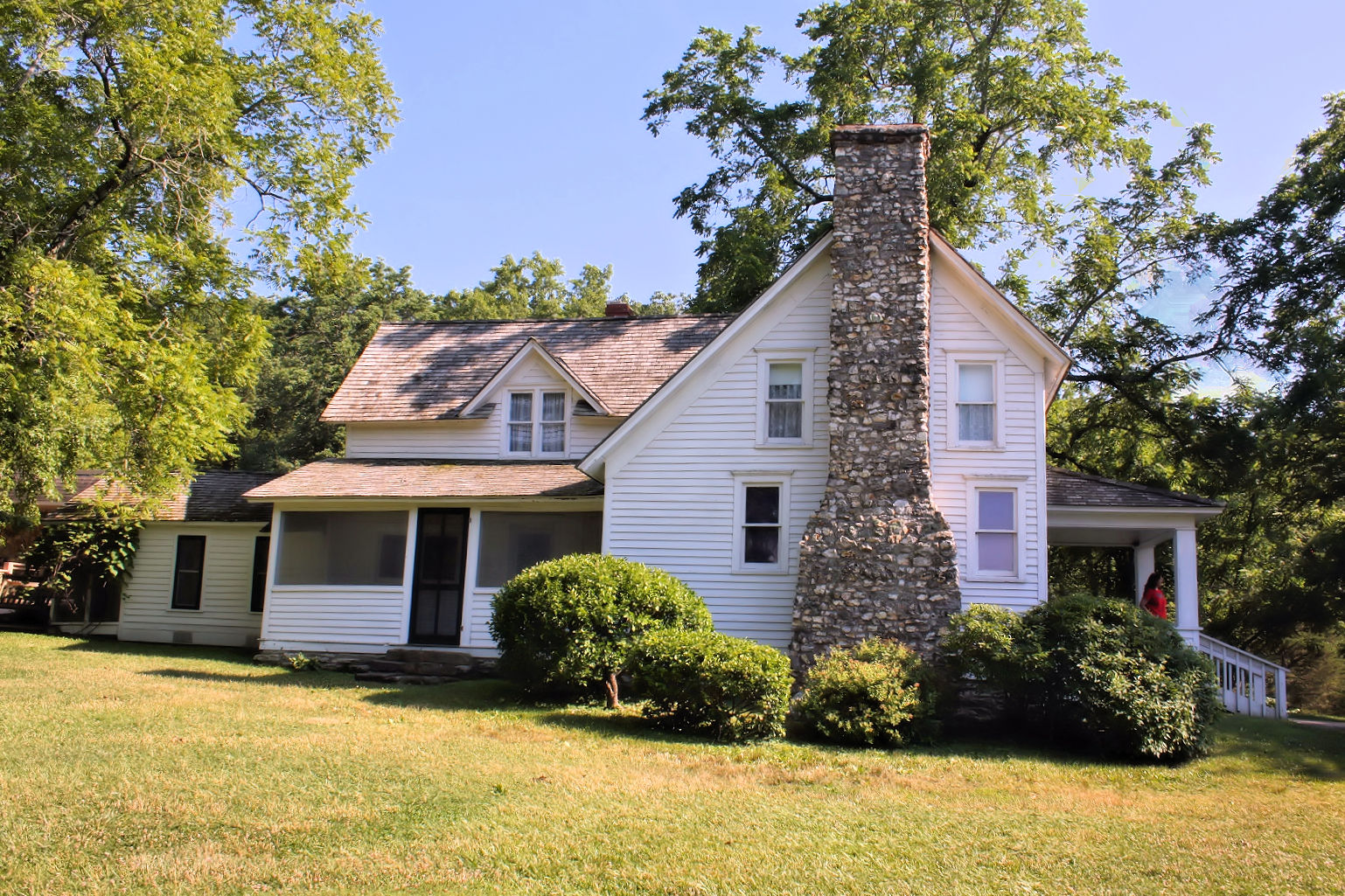
Rocky Ridge Farm, Mansfield, Missouri

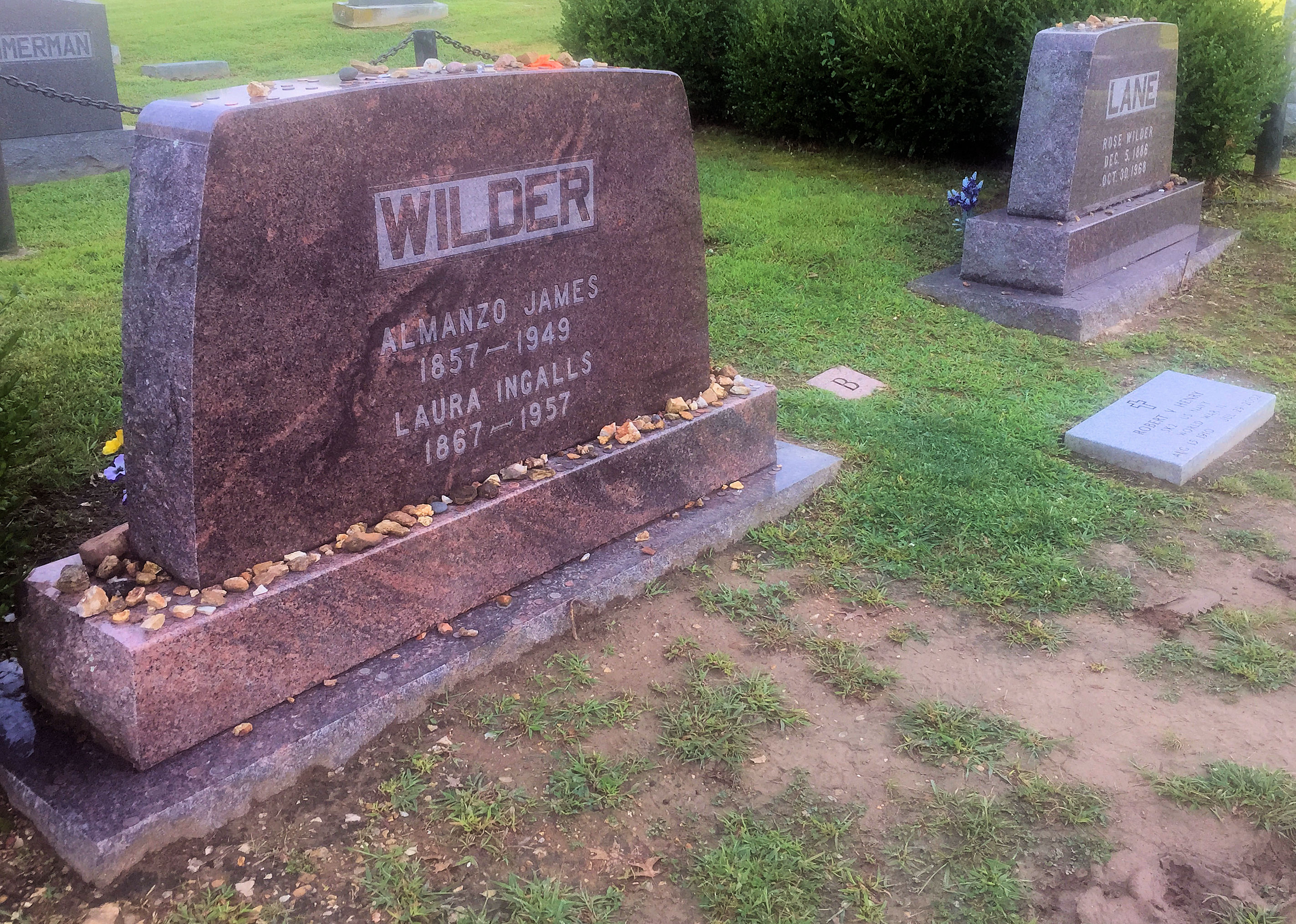
Gravesite of Laura Ingalls Wilder and husband Almanzo Wilder at Mansfield Cemetery, Mansfield, Missouri. Buried next to them is daughter Rose Wilder Lane.

On July 17, 1894, the Wilders left De Smet for the Ozarks of Missouri by covered wagon, attracted by brochures of "The Land of the Big Red Apple" and stories of a local man who had traveled to Missouri to see the area for himself. On August 31, they arrived near Mansfield, Missouri, and Wilder placed a $100 down payment on 40 acres (16.2 ha) of hilly, rocky undeveloped land that his wife aptly named "Rocky Ridge Farm." The farm would be the couple's final home. Over the span of 20 years, Wilder built his wife what she later referred to as her dream house: a unique 10-room home in which he custom-built kitchen cabinets to accommodate her small, five-foot (1.52 m) frame.

Rocky Ridge Farm was eventually expanded to about 200 acres (80.9 ha) and was a productive poultry, dairy, and fruit farm. Wilder's lifetime love of Morgan horses was indulged, and he also kept a large herd of cows and goats. Having learned a hard lesson by focusing on wheat farming in South Dakota, the Wilders chose a more diversified approach to farming suited to the climate of the Ozarks. Almanzo Wilder lived out the rest of his life on his farm, and both he and his wife were active in various community and church pursuits during their time in Missouri.

Although royalties from the Little House books helped provide for the Wilders, their daughter helped support them until the mid-1930s. Eventually their efforts at Rocky Ridge during the 1930s and 1940s, along with the book royalties finally provided a secure enough income to allow them to attain a financial stability they had not known earlier in their marriage. When they were first married, Wilder's wife had helped contribute to their income by taking in occasional boarders, writing columns for a rural newspaper, and serving as Treasurer/Loan Officer for a Farm Loan Association. Their daughter lived with the Wilders on the farm for long periods of time, seeing that electricity and other modern updates were brought to the place, even having an English-style stone cottage built for them, and then taking over the farm house for about ten years.

Wilder learned to drive an automobile, which greatly improved their ability to leave the farm. The couple took several long auto trips, with destinations such as California and the Pacific Northwest, and went several times to visit the remaining Ingalls family in South Dakota. When their daughter moved permanently to Connecticut around 1937, the Wilders quickly returned to their beloved farm house, later selling off the eastern land with the stone cottage.

Wilder spent his final years happily tending small vegetable and flower gardens, indulging his lifetime love of woodworking and carpentry and tending his goats. He aided his wife in greeting the carloads of Little House fans who regularly found their way to Rocky Ridge Farm.

Wilder died on October 23, 1949, after suffering two heart attacks. Laura Ingalls Wilder died eight years later, on February 10, 1957. Their daughter, Rose Wilder Lane lived until 1968. All three are buried in Mansfield, and many of Wilder's possessions and handiwork can be seen today at Rocky Ridge Farm, as well as the Malone, New York, and Spring Valley, Minnesota, farm sites. The Rocky Ridge Farm is known today as the Laura Ingalls Wilder/Rose Wilder Lane Museum.

From the accounts left by his wife and daughter, Almanzo Wilder appears to have been a quiet, stoic man, representative of the time and culture in which he lived. His love of farming, horses, and rural living are well documented within his family and friends' written recollections.

=== Family tree ===
James Wilder (1757–1851) & Mary Polly Gould (1765–1828)	Thomas Payne & Sarah Stewart Mason	Justin Day, I & unknown	unknown & unknown
Abel Wilder (1784–1849)	Hannah Payne (1790–1842)	Justin Day, II (1790–1861)	Diadema Bateman (1794–1868)
James Mason Wilder (1813–1899)	Angeline Albina Day (1821–1905)
Laura Ann Wilder (1844–1899)	Royal Gould Wilder (1847–1925)	Eliza Jane Wilder (1850–1930)	Alice M. Wilder (1852–1892)	Almanzo James Wilder (1859–1949)	Perley Day Wilder (1869–1934)

== In the media ==
=== Books ===
Laura Ingalls Wilder published in 1933 the novel Farmer Boy, a mostly fictional account based on one year from Almanzo's childhood. Heather Williams wrote and published, in 2012, Farmer Boy Goes West, another (and even more) fictional book based on Almanzo's childhood.

=== Television ===
Wilder was portrayed in the television adaptations of Little House on the Prairie by :

- Dean Butler, in the television series Little House on the Prairie and its movie sequels
- Walton Goggins, in Beyond the Prairie: The True Story of Laura Ingalls Wilder films.

== Legacy ==
The boyhood home of Almanzo Wilder near Malone, New York, was listed on the National Register of Historic Places in 2014. Operated and sustained by the Almanzo & Laura Ingalls Wilder Association, the homestead is an interactive educational center, museum, and working farm.
