= Farmer Boy =

Children's historical novel by Laura Ingalls Wilder

- Front dust jacket with Sewell's illustration
- Author: Laura Ingalls Wilder
- Illustrator: Helen Sewell; Garth Williams (1953)
- Series: Little House
- Genre: Children's novel, farm life
- Set in: near Malone, New York, 1866–67
- Publisher: Harper & Brothers
- Publication date: October 1, 1933
- Publication place: United States
- Media type: Print (hardcover)
- Pages: 230; 371 pp.
- OCLC: 15872400
- LC Class: PZ7.W6461 Far
- Preceded by: Little House in the Big Woods
- Followed by: Little House on the Prairie

Farmer Boy is a children's historical novel written by Laura Ingalls Wilder and published in 1933. It was the second-published one in the Little House series but it is not related to the first, which that of the third directly continues. Thus the later Little House on the Prairie is sometimes called the second one in the series, or the second volume of "the Laura Years". (Note: One five-volume set, Little House: The Laura Years (January 1994), comprises volumes 1 and 3–6. Thus, it features the Ingalls family until Laura is 14-years-old, at the close of The Long Winter early in 1881. The second novel penned by Wilder, Farmer Boy (1933), features Laura's husband Almanzo Wilder as a boy. He later appears in the sixth novel and their courtship begins in the seventh.)

== Plot summary ==
The novel is based on the childhood of Wilder's husband, Almanzo Wilder, who grew up in the 1860s near the town of Malone, New York. It covers roughly one year of his life, beginning just before his ninth birthday and describes a full year of farming. It describes in detail the endless chores involved in running the Wilder family farm, all without powered vehicles or electricity. Young as he is, Almanzo rises before 5 am every day to milk cows and feed stock. In the growing season, he plants and tends crops; in winter, he hauls logs, helps fill the ice house, trains a team of young oxen, and sometimes — when his father can spare him — goes to school. The novel includes stories of his brother, Royal, and sisters, Eliza Jane and Alice.

== Historical background ==
Since Almanzo (1859–1949) was born in February 1859, the novel is set in 1868–1869, not long after Laura's birth (1867–1957). It features Almanzo's brother, Royal (1847–1925), and sisters, Eliza Jane (1850–1930) and Alice (1853–1892). Meanwhile, he also had a sister named Laura (1844–1899), who at the time and events in the novel was already about 24 and had presumably moved out. He later had a brother named Perley Day (1869–1934), who was not yet born at the time the novel is set.

== Reception ==
Virginia Kirkus established her pre-publication review service and its semimonthly bulletin Kirkus Reviews (a later name) in January 1933. As book editor from 1926, she had handled Wilder's debut novel Little House in the Big Woods for Harper & Brothers, which had published it early in 1932 and cut its children's department as an economy measure some months later, for about a year. According to its online archive, Kirkus provided a short review of this novel in the issue dated October 1, 1933, which was also its publication date at Harper: "A juvenile As the Earth Turns. The story of a vanishing phase of American life, with delightful illustrations by Helen Sewell." As the Earth Turns by Gladys Hasty Carroll was released by Macmillan on May 2 with advanced sales of 20,000 and as the Book-of-the-Month Club selection for May. It featured one year on a family farm in Maine.

The Boyhood Home of Almanzo Wilder near Malone is operated by the Almanzo and Laura Ingalls Wilder Association as an interactive educational center, museum, and working farm. It was listed on the National Register of Historic Places in 2014.
