= Wheeler–Ingalls House =

Historic house in Massachusetts, United States

- U.S. National Register of Historic Places
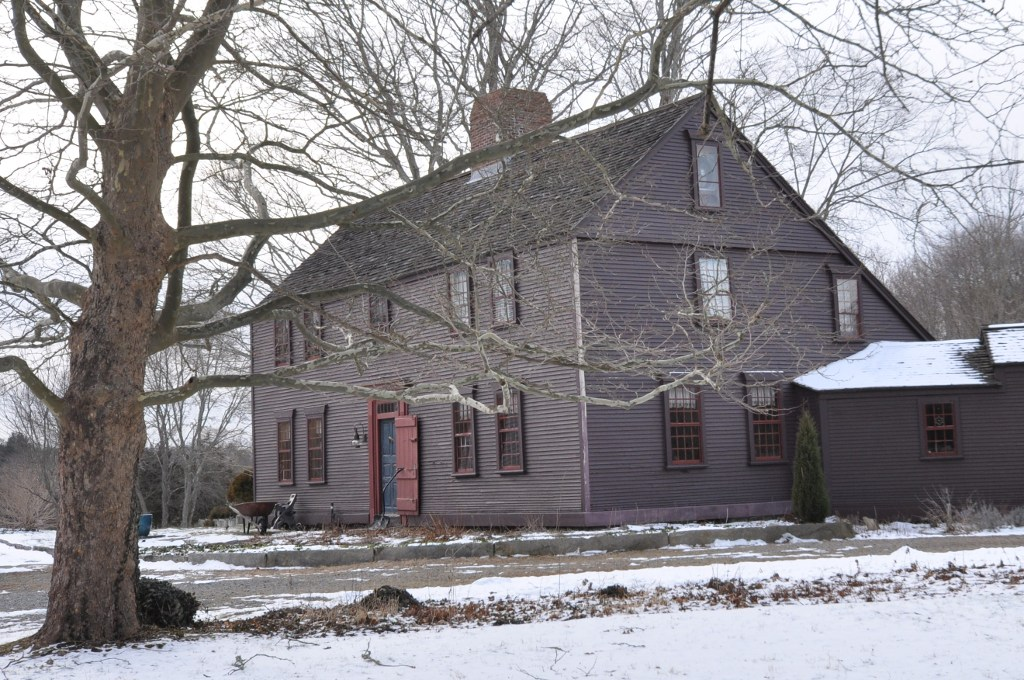

- Location within Massachusetts Location within the United States
- Location: Rehoboth, Massachusetts
- Coordinates: 41°50′4″N 71°14′51″W
- Built: c.1710 (NRHP) c.1730 (median date)
- Architect: Millard, Samuel
- Architectural style: Georgian
- MPS: Rehoboth MRA
- NRHP reference No.: 83000731
- Added to NRHP: July 5, 1983

The Wheeler–Ingalls House is a historic house at 51 Summer Street in Rehoboth, Massachusetts. The oldest portion of this 2 1/2-story saltbox house may have been built between 1710 and 1750 by Samuel Millard. In 1760 it was purchased by Dr. John Wheeler, and by the American Revolutionary War it had passed into the Ingalls family. Starting around this time a rear lean-to and dog leg ell were added and completed by 1800. Federal style modernizations have since been made to the left parlor which include the mantel and field paneled dado. The "excellently preserved" side entry barn was a later addition and dates to at least 1840. Original early-mid 18th century elements including "Chamfered posts, girts, and summer beams were apparently never covered in the right hall." The house was listed on the National Register of Historic Places in 1983.

== See also ==
- National Register of Historic Places listings in Bristol County, Massachusetts
