= Ingalls House (De Smet, South Dakota) =

Historic house in South Dakota, United States

- U.S. National Register of Historic Places
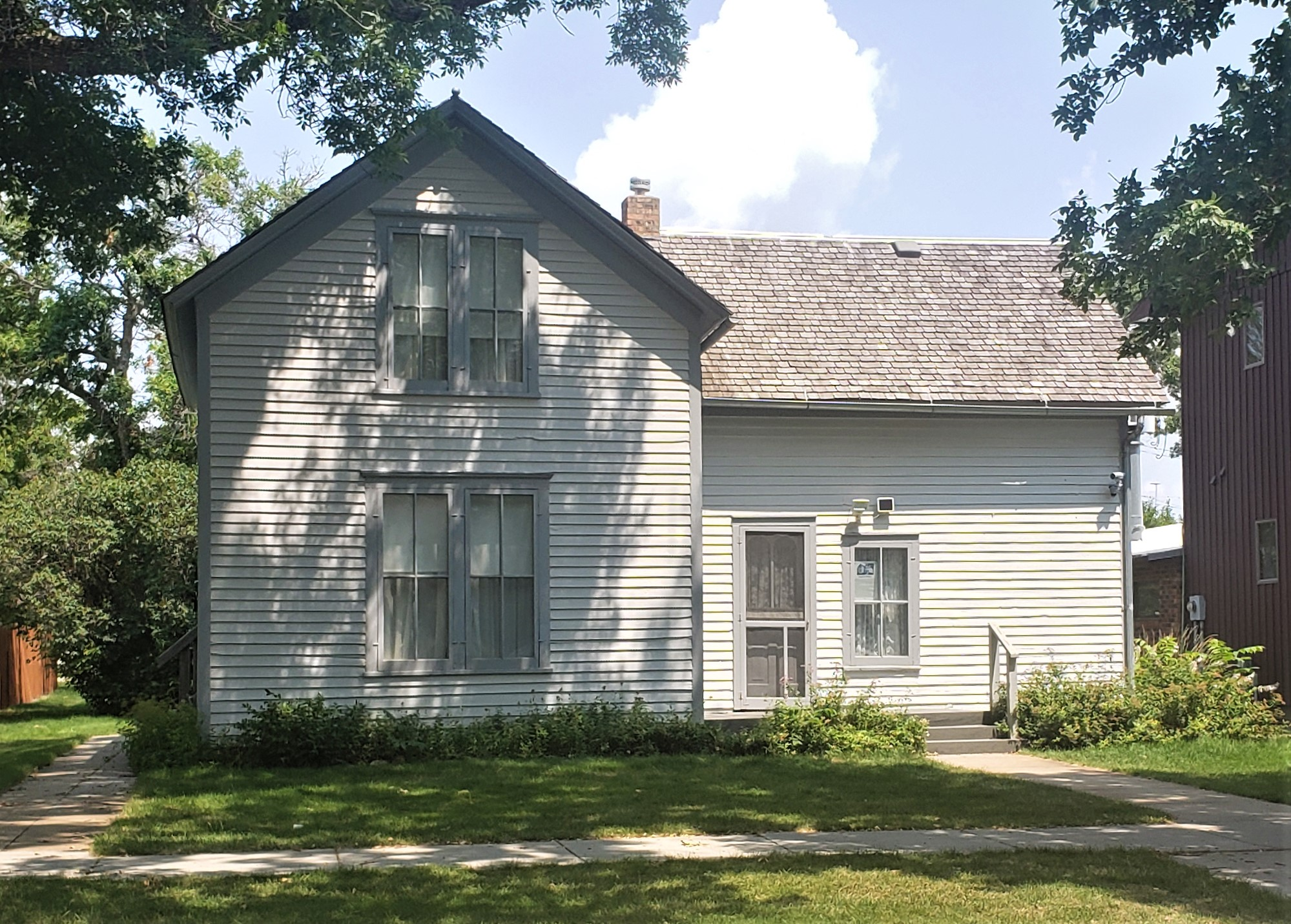

- Location within South Dakota Location within the United States
- Location: 210 3rd St. SW., De Smet, South Dakota
- Coordinates: 44°23′7″N 97°33′7″W
- Area: 0.1 acres (0.040 ha)
- Built: 1887
- Built by: Ingalls, Charles Phillip
- NRHP reference No.: 75001717
- Added to NRHP: April 21, 1975

Ingalls House is a historic house museum at 210 3rd Street Southwest in De Smet, South Dakota. The 3rd street house was moved into on Christmas Eve 1887. Everyone but Laura Ingalls Wilder lived there; she married Almanzo in 1885 and therefore would have not been living with her parents anymore.

After living in the surveyor's house in town in 1879-80 and then homesteading for several years, Charles Phillip Ingalls constructed this town house in 1887, and it was occupied by the family until 1928. It features many furnishings crafted by Mr. Ingalls. The Laura Ingalls Wilder Memorial Society purchased the house in 1967 and opened it to the public the next year.

The bodies of Charles, Caroline, Mary, Carrie, and Grace Ingalls, and the unnamed infant son of Laura and Almanzo Wilder and Grace's husband, Nathan Dow, are buried nearby in the De Smet Cemetery a little over a mile away.

The house was added to the National Register of Historic Places in 1975.

When the Ingalls lived there, fruit trees filled up the back yard and a vegetable garden was in the adjacent lot. Also a barn and a sand-point pump were in constant use.

== See also ==
- Laura Ingalls Wilder House, Mansfield, Missouri
