= Accumulated winter season severity index =

Seasonal weather index

The accumulated winter season severity index or AWSSI provides a scientific way to compare the severity of a winter relative to its weather history. Points are assigned daily based on the maximum and minimum temperature, snowfall and snow depth for a specific site and accumulated through the winter. The index can be used for historical comparisons, road maintenance and to understand how severe a current winter is.

== History ==
The AWSSI was originally developed in 2015 by researchers Barbara E. Mayes Boustead, Steven D. Hilberg, Martha D. Shulski and Kenneth G. Hubbard. The index was developed "to examine relationships to teleconnection patterns, determine trends, and create sector-specific applications, as well as to analyze an ongoing winter or any individual winter season to place its severity in context." In 2020 the team used the AWSSI model and a related model called the precipitation-based AWSSI (pAWSSI) to analyze the winter of 1880/1881 in the Central United States; that winter was the subject of Laura Ingalls Wilder’s The Long Winter.

== Calculation ==
Values are assigned on a daily basis based on the maximum and minimum temperature, 24-hour snowfall and depth of snow on the ground. Values start being calculated at the start of winter. The start of winter is defined when any of these conditions are met: 1) daily maximum temperature ≤ 32 °F (0 °C), 2) first measurable snowfall or 3) it is December 1. Likewise, values stop being calculated at the end of winter – when the last of the following four conditions occurs: 1) daily maximum temperature ≤ 32 °F (0 °C) no longer occurs, 2) no daily measurable snowfall, 3) daily snow depth ≥ 1.0 in. (2.5 cm) is no longer observed, or 4) it is March 1.

AWSSI point thresholds
Temperature			Snow	
Points	Max	Min	Snowfall	Snowdepth
1	25 to 32	25 to 32	0.1 to 0.9	1
2	20 to 24	20 to 24	1.0 to 1.9	2
3	15 to 19	15 to 19	2.0 to 2.9	3
4	10 to 14	10 to 14	3.0 to 3.9	4 to 5
5	5 to 9	5 to 9	–	6 to 8
6	0 to 4	0 to 4	4.0 to 4.9	9 to 11
7	−1 to −5	−1 to −5	5.0 to 5.9	12 to 14
8	−6 to −10	−6 to −10	–	15 to 17
9	−11 to −15	−11 to −15	6.0 to 6.9	18 to 23
10	−16 to −20	−16 to −20	7.0 to 7.9	24 to 35
11	–	−21 to −25	–	–
12	–	–	8.0 to 8.9	–
13	–	–	9.0 to 9.9	–
14	–	–	10.0 to 11.9	–
15	<-20	-26 to -35	-	36+
18	-	-	12.0 to 14.9	-
20	-	<-35	-	36+
22	-	-	15.0 to 17.9	-
26	-	-	18.0 to 23.9	-
36	-	-	24.0 to 29.9	-
45	-	-	>=30.0	–

== AWSSI climatology ==
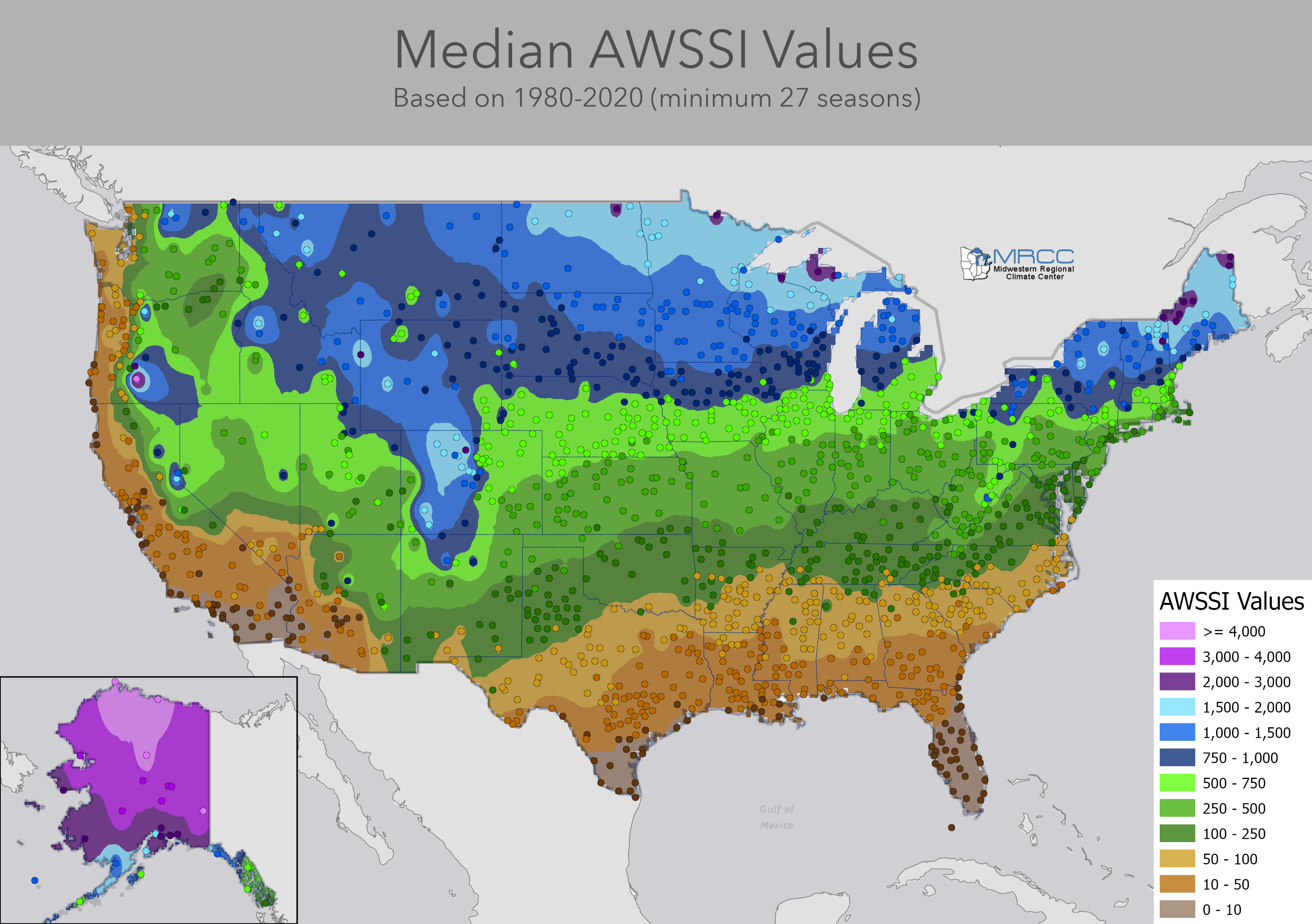
AWSSI climo 1980–2020

== See also ==
- Regional Snowfall Index
