= National Register of Historic Places listings in Kingsbury County, South Dakota =

Location of Kingsbury County in South Dakota

This is a list of the National Register of Historic Places listings in Kingsbury County, South Dakota.

This is intended to be a complete list of the properties and districts on the National Register of Historic Places in Kingsbury County, South Dakota, United States. The locations of National Register properties and districts for which the latitude and longitude coordinates are included below, may be seen in a map.

There are 23 properties and districts listed on the National Register in the county.

This National Park Service list is complete through NPS recent listings posted May 1, 2026.

== Current listings ==
	Name on the Register	Image	Date listed	Location	City or town	Description
1	Arlington Masonic Temple	Arlington Masonic Temple	February 27, 2017 (#100000690)	222 S. Main St. 44°21′47″N 97°08′06″W	Arlington	
2	Badger School District Number 18		August 2, 2006 (#06000665)	Junction of Main St. and 1st Ave. 44°29′12″N 97°12′30″W	Badger	
3	Bank of the Iroquois Building		May 30, 2002 (#02000576)	Junction of Washita and Quapaw Sts. 44°22′01″N 97°51′01″W	Iroquois	
4	Berger Farmstead		March 15, 2005 (#05000179)	19802 446th Ave. 44°30′54″N 97°17′20″W	Badger	
5	Central Dakota Flouring Mill Grain Elevator	Central Dakota Flouring Mill Grain Elevator	May 30, 2002 (#02000573)	202 E. Elm St. 44°21′47″N 97°07′50″W	Arlington	No longer extant per Google Street View.
6	Chicago Northwestern Depot	Chicago Northwestern Depot	December 12, 1976 (#76001739)	Highway 25; 44°23′09″N 97°32′50″W	De Smet	
7	Esmond Methodist Episcopal Church and Township Hall		August 2, 2006 (#06000666)	Junction of Center St. and Elm St. 44°15′53″N 97°46′19″W	Esmond	
8	First Methodist Episcopal Church of Lake Preston		February 1, 2023 (#100008611)	106 2nd St. NE; 44°21′44″N 97°22′38″W	Lake Preston	
9	Hetland School		May 30, 2002 (#02000572)	Park St. 44°22′43″N 97°14′11″W	Hetland	
10	Ingalls House	Ingalls House	April 21, 1975 (#75001717)	210 3rd St., W. 44°23′07″N 97°33′17″W	De Smet	
11	Kingsbury County Courthouse	Kingsbury County Courthouse	September 22, 1977 (#77001249)	Highway 25; 44°23′10″N 97°32′41″W	De Smet	
12	Lake Preston High School	Lake Preston High School	October 24, 2003 (#03001074)	300 First Street, N.E. 44°21′48″N 97°22′24″W	Lake Preston	1925 Art Deco school building which represents a genuine example of a type of school established during consolidation and educational reform in South Dakota, spanning the period 1900-1930, and embodies the distinctive characteristics of the method of construction utilized for Consolidated schools of this period.
13	Lake Preston Tourist Park Historic District		May 30, 2002 (#02000574)	Junction of U.S. Route 14 and S. Park Ave. 44°21′36″N 97°22′07″W	Lake Preston	
14	Oldham Methodist Church		September 25, 1987 (#87001728)	Main St. and Epton Ave. 44°13′41″N 97°18′40″W	Oldham	
15	Omdalen Barn		August 2, 2006 (#06000667)	44750 209th St. 44°21′22″N 97°15′38″W	Lake Preston	
16	Peterson-Loriks House		June 19, 1980 (#80003726)	In Oldham; 44°13′48″N 97°18′30″W	Oldham	
17	Railroad Camp Shanty	Railroad Camp Shanty	March 20, 1973 (#73001744)	1st and Olivet Sts. 44°23′12″N 97°32′38″W	De Smet	
18	Adam and Minnie Royhl House	Adam and Minnie Royhl House	June 6, 2001 (#01000638)	203 S. 3rd St. 44°21′47″N 97°08′12″W	Arlington	
19	Thomas H. Ruth House	Thomas H. Ruth House	February 12, 1999 (#99000212)	209 Poinset Ave. 44°23′03″N 97°33′05″W	De Smet	
20	Shady Lawn School No. 8		June 26, 2019 (#100004125)	42893 198th St. 44°30′49″N 97°38′02″W	De Smet	
21	South Dakota Dept. of Transportation Bridge No. 39-006-070		December 9, 1993 (#93001297)	Local road over Pearl Creek; 44°26′27″N 97°50′26″W	Iroquois	
22	Stark and Blanch Garage	Stark and Blanch Garage	November 19, 2007 (#07001212)	204 S. Main; 44°21′56″N 97°08′06″W	Arlington	
23	Olaf Stordahl Barn		May 30, 2002 (#02000575)	45210 199th St. 44°30′15″N 97°09′52″W	Arlington	

== Former listings ==
	Name on the Register	Image	Date listed	Date removed	Location	City or town	Description
1	Esmond Bridge		December 9, 1993 (#93001298)	December 15, 1999	Local rd. over Redstone Cr.	De Smet vicinity	
2	South Dakota Dept. of Transportation Bridge No. 39-176-100		December 9, 1993 (#93001299)	December 15, 1999	Local rd. over unnamed cr.	De Smet vicinity	

== See also ==
- List of National Historic Landmarks in South Dakota
- National Register of Historic Places listings in South Dakota
