= List of United States tornadoes from June to July 2013 =

This is a list of all tornadoes that were confirmed by local offices of the National Weather Service in the United States from June to July 2013.

== United States yearly total ==
Confirmed tornadoes by Enhanced Fujita rating
EFU	EF0	EF1	EF2	EF3	EF4	EF5	Total
0	499	309	80	19	8	1	916

== June ==
Confirmed tornadoes by Enhanced Fujita rating
EFU	EF0	EF1	EF2	EF3	EF4	EF5	Total
0	92	30	5	1	0	0	128

=== June 1 event ===
List of confirmed tornadoes – Saturday, June 1, 2013 (Note: All dates are based on the local time zone where the tornado touched down; however, all times are in Coordinated Universal Time for consistency.)
EF#	Location	County / Parish	State	Start Coord.	Time (UTC)	Path length	Max width	Summary
EF1	NE of St. Paul	Madison	AR	35.8367°N 93.7525°W	0654 – 0655	1 mi (1.6 km)	250 yd (230 m)	The roof was removed from a mobile home, two barns were damaged, and a site-built home suffered minor roof damage. Many trees were downed, one of which fell on and badly damaged a truck.

=== June 2 event ===
List of confirmed tornadoes – Sunday, June 2, 2013
EF#	Location	County / Parish	State	Start Coord.	Time (UTC)	Path length	Max width	Summary
EF0	SSW of Corpus Christi	Nueces	TX	27.6816°N 97.5303°W	1550 – 1552	0.21 mi (0.34 km)	10 yd (9.1 m)	Brief landspout tornado south of the Corpus Christi International Airport was caught on camera but caused no damage.
EF0	N of Eagle Lake	Aroostook	ME	47.0703°N 68.6045°W	1906	80 yd (73 m)	50 yd (46 m)	Very small and brief tornado touched down along the leading edge of a microburst. No damage was reported from the tornado but the microburst downed many trees.
EF1	WSW of Anderson	Anderson	SC	34.49°N 82.79°W	2009 – 2022	4.82 mi (7.76 km)	125 yd (114 m)	Intermittent tornado first damaged a farmstead, where metal roofing on a well-built shed was peeled back and another shed and a 3,000 pounds (1,400 kg) bale of hay were thrown about 100 feet (30 m). The tornado skipped along (briefly lifting) and did considerable damage to a residence: a large portion of roofing was removed from the house, a deck was lifted over the house and deposited on a road, and a garage door was blown in. The entire home and a nearby small storage shed were slightly shifted off of their foundations. The tornado continued skipping eastward and caused minor shingle damage to two sheds and another residence. It briefly lifted for the third time and touched back down, downing two large pine trees, both of which caused considerable damage to a residence. Many other trees were downed along the path.
EF0	W of Wyman Dam	Somerset	ME	45.0652°N 69.9472°W	2036 – 2037	0.03 mi (0.048 km)	40 yd (37 m)	Very brief and weak tornado northwest of Bingham downed about a dozen trees.

=== June 3 event ===
List of confirmed tornadoes – Monday, June 3, 2013
EF#	Location	County / Parish	State	Start Coord.	Time (UTC)	Path length	Max width	Summary
EF0	SW of Ollie	Fallon	MT	46.50°N 104.19°W	2200 – 2220	1 mi (1.6 km)	50 yd (46 m)	Brief tornado touched down twice in an open area and caused no damage.
EF0	WSW of Bowman	Bowman	ND	46.17°N 103.43°W	2215 – 2216	0.03 mi (0.048 km)	20 yd (18 m)	Brief tornado caused no damage.
EF0	ESE of Golva	Golden Valley	ND	46.67°N 103.66°W	2320 – 2321	0.02 mi (0.032 km)	20 yd (18 m)	Brief tornado downed several 6-inch (15 cm) in diameter trees on a ranch.
EF0	NE of Bucyrus	Adams	ND	46.15°N 102.64°W	0005 – 0007	0.26 mi (0.42 km)	30 yd (27 m)	Brief tornado touched down north of Hettinger and caused no damage.

=== June 4 event ===
List of confirmed tornadoes – Tuesday, June 4, 2013
EF#	Location	County / Parish	State	Start Coord.	Time (UTC)	Path length	Max width	Summary
EF1	E of Bowman to NE of Rosinville	Orangeburg, Dorchester	SC	33.33°N 80.59°W	1929 – 1940	5.4 mi (8.7 km)	264 yd (241 m)	Several trees and power lines were downed in Orangeburg County, a few of which fell on homes. Eight homes in total were damaged and 28 agricultural buildings were either badly damaged or destroyed. In Dorchester County, the tornado crossed Interstate 95, downing trees and damaging corn crops until it lifted near U.S. Highway 15 just south of exit 172 on Interstate 26. A house sustained minor roof damage and a tree fell onto a trailer/mobile home.
EF1	NW of Rosinville	Dorchester	SC	33.2991°N 80.5621°W	1941 – 1944	2.06 mi (3.32 km)	176 yd (161 m)	The tornado crossed Interstate 95 and numerous fields and forested areas, downing trees and damaging corn crops.
EF0	SW of Higbee	Otero	CO	37.69°N 103.53°W	2313 – 2319	2.19 mi (3.52 km)	100 yd (91 m)	No damage was reported.
EF0	SSW of Karval	Lincoln	CO	38.62°N 103.58°W	2353	0.1 mi (0.16 km)	50 yd (46 m)	Brief, small tornado caused no damage.
EF0	WSW of Colfax	Richland	ND	46.43°N 97.03°W	0016	0.1 mi (0.16 km)	20 yd (18 m)	Brief tornado caught on camera caused no damage.
EF0	SW of Lakin	Kearny	KS	37.8493°N 101.401°W	0207 – 0212	2.85 mi (4.59 km)	100 yd (91 m)	The tornado developed at an occlusion of a gust front but did no damage.

=== June 5 event ===
List of confirmed tornadoes – Wednesday, June 5, 2013
EF#	Location	County / Parish	State	Start Coord.	Time (UTC)	Path length	Max width	Summary
EF0	SSW of Mullinville	Kiowa	KS	37.5245°N 99.4956°W	0532 – 0535	0.97 mi (1.56 km)	50 yd (46 m)	A detached garage was destroyed and then thrown northwest by a small tornado on the leading edge of a squall line.
EF0	WSW of Belvidere	Kiowa	KS	37.4077°N 99.2982°W	0548 – 0553	2.02 mi (3.25 km)	75 yd (69 m)	Tornado on the leading edge of a squall line caused no damage.
EF0	WNW of West Concord	Dodge	MN	44.18°N 92.97°W	2242	0.01 mi (0.016 km)	5 yd (4.6 m)	Brief tornado with no damage was caught on camera by a storm spotter.
EF0	NE of Marion	Crittenden	AR	35.2432°N 90.1013°W	0102 – 0103	0.39 mi (0.63 km)	25 yd (23 m)	A tornado touched down in a field and then moved into the Mississippi River; no damage was reported.

=== June 6 event ===
Events were associated with Tropical Storm Andrea.

List of confirmed tornadoes – Thursday, June 6, 2013
EF#	Location	County / Parish	State	Start Coord.	Time (UTC)	Path length	Max width	Summary
EF0	Myakka City	Manatee	FL	27.334°N 82.158°W	0647 – 0651	1.51 mi (2.43 km)	50 yd (46 m)	Three homes suffered roof damage and six pole barns and four outbuildings were destroyed. A horse and six chickens were killed and two dogs and another horse were injured. Power lines were downed as well.
EF0	Belle Glade	Palm Beach	FL	26.6734°N 80.6706°W	0718 – 0720	0.62 mi (1.00 km)	25 yd (23 m)	Trees and power lines were downed and an awning was damaged.
EF0	Sun City Center	Hillsborough	FL	27.705°N 82.345°W	0747 – 0751	2.5 mi (4.0 km)	50 yd (46 m)	Numerous homes suffered shingle and fascia damage and trees were downed.
EF1	NNW of Royal Palm Beach	Palm Beach	FL	26.780°N 80.247°W	1045 – 1050	2 mi (3.2 km)	100 yd (91 m)	Several homes sustained minor to moderate roof damage in a community north of Wellington. A couple of homes sustained more serious roof damage, with partial uplift of the roofs. A garage door was completely blown in, a few vehicles were moved, and a 30 ft (9.1 m) boat was flipped on its side. Numerous trees were downed, a few of which caused damage to car windows. One person suffered serious injuries.
EF0	NNW of Weston	Broward, Palm Beach	FL	26.224°N 80.4854°W	1157 – 1240	20.73 mi (33.36 km)	25 yd (23 m)	Tornado touched down just east of U.S. Highway 27 about 6 mi (9.7 km) north of Alligator Alley. It then moved into Palm Beach County before dissipating without causing damage.
EF0	Gulfport	Pinellas	FL	27.736°N 82.710°W	1403 – 1405	1.87 mi (3.01 km)	50 yd (46 m)	A waterspout came ashore and caused fascia, shingle, awning, and fencing damage to 12 homes west-southwest of St. Petersburg.
EF0	SSE of Venice	Sarasota	FL	27.027°N 82.414°W	1513 – 1516	1.64 mi (2.64 km)	50 yd (46 m)	Fences, swimming pool cages, and carports suffered minor damage, a couple homes sustained minor roof damage, and numerous trees were downed in South Venice.
EF0	NNW of Fort Myers Shores	Lee	FL	26.752°N 81.764°W	1805 – 1807	0.26 mi (0.42 km)	30 yd (27 m)	Brief tornado downed several trees.
EF1	E of Mayport to Fernandina Beach	Duval, Nassau	FL	30.39°N 81.40°W	2048 – 2112	18.89 mi (30.40 km)	704 yd (644 m)	A few structures on the eastern part of the Mayport Naval Station suffered minor roof and window damage. The tornado then continued into the St. Johns River and became a waterspout before moving through sparsely populated areas and into Fernandina Beach, where several trees were downed and a few structures were damaged.
EF0	E of Suwannee Springs	Suwannee	FL	30.3774°N 82.7819°W	2107 – 2110	3.17 mi (5.10 km)	100 yd (91 m)	Weak tornado downed trees and power lines and blew metal roofing and tin siding into tree tops.

=== June 7 event ===
Event was associated with Tropical Storm Andrea.

List of confirmed tornadoes – Friday, June 7, 2013
EF#	Location	County / Parish	State	Start Coord.	Time (UTC)	Path length	Max width	Summary
EF0	W of Varnamtown	Brunswick	NC	33.9406°N 78.2504°W	0522 – 0523	0.09 mi (0.14 km)	20 yd (18 m)	Brief tornado south of East Arcadia downed multiple trees and damaged a large storage building.

=== June 9 event ===
List of confirmed tornadoes – Sunday, June 9, 2013
EF#	Location	County / Parish	State	Start Coord.	Time (UTC)	Path length	Max width	Summary
EF0	E of Lowmansville	Johnson, Lawrence	KY	37.908°N 82.7198°W	2154 – 2156	0.49 mi (0.79 km)	50 yd (46 m)	Tornado caused minor damage for 0.5 mi (0.80 km) and then became intermittent, causing more sporadic minor damage for another 1.5 mi (2.4 km) before lifting. Two houses and a barn received minor soffit damage, a door was ripped from the barn, and a metal carport was ripped up and thrown several yards. A fenced garden was damaged and several trees were downed as well.
EF1	N of Winchester	Franklin	TN	35.2300°N 86.1291°W	2309 – 2314	2.85 mi (4.59 km)	150 yd (140 m)	Many trees were downed and a home sustained roof damage, with approximately one-fourth of the shingles removed.
EF0	ENE of Estill Springs	Franklin	TN	35.3061°N 85.9859°W	2332 – 2333	0.29 mi (0.47 km)	50 yd (46 m)	Brief tornado downed several trees and caused minor roof and structural damage to a barn and very minor roof damage to a house.

=== June 10 event ===
List of confirmed tornadoes – Monday, June 10, 2013
EF#	Location	County / Parish	State	Start Coord.	Time (UTC)	Path length	Max width	Summary
EF1	ENE of Piedmont	Greenville	SC	34.716°N 82.423°W	1720 – 1723	1.34 mi (2.16 km)	80 yd (73 m)	Many trees and numerous power lines were downed.
EF2	NW of Adairville to WSW of Franklin	Logan, Simpson	KY	36.713°N 86.9166°W	1840 – 1909	13.9 mi (22.4 km)	325 yd (297 m)	In all, five homes sustained extensive damage, two other homes had minor damage, five grain silos were blown away, with some being blown over 0.25 mi (0.40 km), and two other grain silos collapsed. Many outbuildings were either damaged or destroyed, hundreds of trees were downed, and many crop fields were flattened. Some minor ground scouring was observed as well from this high-end EF2 tornado. Four people were injured.
EF0	Fork	Baltimore	MD	39.462°N 76.449°W	1924 – 1928	0.5 mi (0.80 km)	100 yd (91 m)	Brief intermittent tornado downed several trees and damaged a wood fence.
EF0	SSE of Downtown Baltimore	Baltimore City	MD	39.262°N 76.593°W	1944 – 1945	0.2 mi (0.32 km)	75 yd (69 m)	Waterspout over the Patapsco River came onshore and peeled off part of the roof of a metal building. A small trailer was demolished and thrown 60 feet (18 m), an air-conditioning unit in the window of an office building was blown in, and a large amount of debris was plastered against a chain-link fence as well.
EF0	Newark	New Castle	DE	39.65°N 75.74°W	2047 – 2048	0.9 mi (1.4 km)	150 yd (140 m)	Brief intermittent tornado in the southeast part of town (on the southeast side of the University of Delaware campus) damaged 10 to 20 homes and downed many trees. Several of the homes, as well as a car, were damaged by falling trees, while other homes suffered shingle and siding damage as a direct result of wind.
EF0	WSW of Jetersville	Amelia	VA	37.28°N 78.13°W	2213 – 2215	0.1 mi (0.16 km)	25 yd (23 m)	Very weak and brief tornado with no damage.
EF0	Woodbine	Howard	MD	39.291°N 77.127°W	2259 – 2301	0.5 mi (0.80 km)	100 yd (91 m)	A two-car garage suffered significant damage, numerous trees and a road sign were downed, and a wire fence sustained minor damage.
EF1	NNE of Jacksonville	Onslow	NC	34.81°N 77.41°W	0005 – 0006	0.57 mi (0.92 km)	50 yd (46 m)	Tornado caused sporadic minor structural damage to a few homes and downed trees.
EF0	S of Coltons Point	St. Mary's	MD	38.223°N 76.755°W	0101 – 0102	0.25 mi (0.40 km)	50 yd (46 m)	Brief, weak tornado caused minor roof damage to several structures. Trees and power lines were downed, a trampoline was lifted and became lodged 90 feet (27 m) above the ground in a very tall pine tree, and two wooden play sets were blown over (one was dragged 15 feet (4.6 m) as well).

=== June 11 event ===
List of confirmed tornadoes – Tuesday, June 11, 2013
EF#	Location	County / Parish	State	Start Coord.	Time (UTC)	Path length	Max width	Summary
EF1	SSW of Chadron	Dawes	NE	42.5840°N 103.1668°W	0231 – 0238	0.99 mi (1.59 km)	40 yd (37 m)	Eight outbuildings were destroyed and eight other structures were damaged north of Box Butte Reservoir. Numerous trees and power poles were downed and two horse trailers were thrown several hundred feet.
EF0	NNE of Box Butte Reservoir	Dawes	NE	42.636°N 103.0565°W	0247 – 0252	0.76 mi (1.22 km)	40 yd (37 m)	Weak tornado moved across open land and caused no damage.

=== June 12 event ===
List of confirmed tornadoes – Wednesday, June 12, 2013
EF#	Location	County / Parish	State	Start Coord.	Time (UTC)	Path length	Max width	Summary
EF3	Belmond	Wright	IA	42.8824°N 93.6832°W	2108 – 2127	6.2 mi (10.0 km)	200 yd (180 m)	High-end EF3 tornado touched down to the northwest of Belmond and tracked generally southeast, damaging a machine shed. Quickly intensifying, it reached EF2 strength as it struck a farmstead, causing significant damage. As it approached U.S. Highway 69, it reached high-end EF3 intensity. A home was detached from its cinder-block foundation and destroyed, and several business were heavily damaged, including a restaurant. A warehouse was also destroyed and partially swept off its foundation. Damage was relatively light for the remainder of the track northeast and east of town, with the tornado later roping out and dissipating to the east-southeast of Belmond. The tornado crossed the track of the 2119 UTC EF1 tornado that had passed through area east of Belmond almost 10 minutes earlier.
EF1	ESE of Belmond	Wright	IA	42.849°N 93.6044°W	2119 – 2132	5 mi (8.0 km)	125 yd (114 m)	As the 2108 UTC EF3 tornado was north of Belmond (eight minutes before the EF3 dissipated), another tornado touched down to the east of town. This tornado remained over mostly open areas, though it knocked a mesonet station off the roof of the elementary school and downed a grove of trees.
EF0	NW of Belmond	Wright	IA	42.8703°N 93.663°W	2121 – 2124	1.13 mi (1.82 km)	50 yd (46 m)	An anticyclonic tornado on the backside of the Belmond EF3 tornado moved across open farmland.
EF2	NNE of Alexander to NW of Latimer	Franklin	IA	42.8246°N 93.4745°W	2132 – 2144	5.2 mi (8.4 km)	300 yd (270 m)	As the 2126 UTC EF1 storm was dissipating, this tornado touched down further east. It heavily damaged several farms before dissipating just before reaching Interstate 35.
EF1	NE of Latimer to NW of Hampton	Franklin	IA	42.7917°N 93.3297°W	2146 – 2155	3.43 mi (5.52 km)	75 yd (69 m)	A small tornado damaged the roof of a barn and downed about a dozen trees at two farmsteads.
EF1	S of Shabbona	DeKalb	IL	41.7344°N 88.8923°W	2132 – 2137	2.27 mi (3.65 km)	100 yd (91 m)	Many trees and power poles were downed and one structure suffered minor shingle damage.
EF0	NW of Hampton	Franklin	IA	42.7939°N 93.2892°W	2153 – 2156	1.26 mi (2.03 km)	125 yd (114 m)	A well-documented tornado remained over open farmland.
EF0	NW of Hampton	Franklin	IA	42.7771°N 93.2299°W	2156 – 2159	1.11 mi (1.79 km)	50 yd (46 m)	Weak tornado caused minor damage to the roof of a barn and downed several trees.
EF0	S of Hanover	Jo Daviess	IL	42.2178°N 90.2422°W	2350	0.5 mi (0.80 km)	20 yd (18 m)	Brief, weak tornado with no damage.
EF2	N of Savanna to W of Mount Carroll	Carroll	IL	42.1668°N 90.15°W	2353 – 0003	6.6 mi (10.6 km)	880 yd (800 m)	A home was pushed off of its foundation, several outbuildings were damaged, and many trees were downed. One person was injured.
EF0	NW of Manteno	Kankakee	IL	41.2924°N 87.9086°W	0050 – 0051	0.24 mi (0.39 km)	50 yd (46 m)	Brief tornado touched down at a farmstead and collapsed a barn, killing a horse. Debris was tossed about 75 yd (69 m) to the southeast into a field, where the tornado dissipated.
EF0	Southern Willshire	Van Wert	OH	40.7469°N 84.8016°W	0327 – 0330	0.64 mi (1.03 km)	80 yd (73 m)	Weak, brief tornado on the south side of town caused major roof and window damage to 13 homes and rolled a garage off of its cinder-block foundation. One house lost a portion of its roof and it was thrown over the top of a neighboring house. Several trees were downed as well.
EF0	NW of Rockford	Mercer	OH	40.72°N 84.68°W	0335 – 0336	0.06 mi (0.097 km)	100 yd (91 m)	Part of the roof was removed from an aluminum barn and the barn had four large doors blown out. Debris from this buildings caused damage to surrounding structures, most notably large dents in two grain silos. Another aluminum building suffered siding damage and one window was blown out.
EF0	ESE of New Bavaria	Henry	OH	41.1852°N 84.109°W	0355 – 0356	0.04 mi (0.064 km)	25 yd (23 m)	Very brief tornado destroyed a barn, caused minor roof damage to a home, and downed trees before transitioning into a straight-line wind event.
EF1	N of Hamler	Henry	OH	41.2452°N 84.0358°W	0359 – 0401	0.43 mi (0.69 km)	50 yd (46 m)	A barn was destroyed, a soybean field was damaged, and several trees were downed.

=== June 13 event (Eastern United States) ===
List of confirmed tornadoes – Thursday, June 13, 2013
EF#	Location	County / Parish	State	Start Coord.	Time (UTC)	Path length	Max width	Summary
EF1	SE of Malinta (1st tornado)	Henry	OH	41.2976°N 84.0059°W	0402 – 0403	0.17 mi (0.27 km)	75 yd (69 m)	A barn lost its roof and a house and a detached garage suffered significant damage. The damage to the house included being impacted by a beam from the barn. The top half of a pine tree was thrown 50 feet (15 m) as well.
EF0	SE of Malinta (2nd tornado)	Henry	OH	41.298°N 83.9855°W	0403 – 0404	0.11 mi (0.18 km)	15 yd (14 m)	Very small, brief tornado downed wheat crops in a field. This tornado occurred simultaneously with the following event.
EF0	SE of Malinta (3rd tornado)	Henry	OH	41.3008°N 83.9923°W	0403 – 0404	0.25 mi (0.40 km)	15 yd (14 m)	Very small, brief tornado collapsed the doors and one wall of a pole barn and blew over corn crops. This tornado occurred simultaneously with the previous event.
EF0	E of New Knoxville	Auglaize	OH	40.4975°N 84.2966°W	0403 – 0406	2.32 mi (3.73 km)	50 yd (46 m)	The north side of the administrative building at Neil Armstrong Airport suffered minor damage, sheet metal and tree limbs were deposited on the runway, and six houses and three barns were damaged, with one barn being nearly destroyed. A double-wide mobile home was picked up and tossed 100 feet (30 m) and numerous trees were downed as well.
EF0	W of Custar	Wood	OH	41.2846°N 83.8650°W	0425 – 0427	0.94 mi (1.51 km)	50 yd (46 m)	Two homes and a garage suffered minor roof and door damage and several trees were downed, one of which was thrown 200 feet (61 m) to the northeast. Tornado was embedded in a larger area of straight-line winds.
EF0	SW of Radnor	Delaware	OH	40.361°N 83.182°W	0515 – 0516	0.21 mi (0.34 km)	50 yd (46 m)	Brief tornado destroyed a barn and caused heavy damage to another, with debris being thrown and wrapped around trees along the Scioto River. Some of the cinder-blocks that made up the wall of one barn were moved as well. A small shed was thrown 50 feet (17 yd) and destroyed, corn stalks were thrown about 0.25 mi (0.40 km), and numerous trees were downed.
EF0	WSW of Alsop to NE of Spotsylvania Courthouse	Spotsylvania	VA	38.198°N 77.661°W	1826 – 1833	6.94 mi (11.17 km)	50 yd (46 m)	Tornado downed trees intermittently to the west and north of Spotsylvania Courthouse.
EF0	S of Thornburg	Spotsylvania	VA	38.096°N 77.539°W	1835 – 1840	2.45 mi (3.94 km)	75 yd (69 m)	A shed was destroyed, other sheds suffered roof damage, and a farmhouse sustained minor roof and siding damage along U.S. Highway 1. The tornado then damaged two billboards, crossed Interstate 95, overturned two 8,000 pounds (3,600 kg) RVs at a dealership, and pulled a garage door off of its hinges before dissipating.
EF0	NE of Port Royal to E of Index	King George	VA	38.18°N 77.18°W	1857 – 1906	7.14 mi (11.49 km)	50 yd (46 m)	Intermittent tornado downed numerous trees, including three 20-to-30-inch (51 to 76 cm) in diameter Poplar trees.
EF1	NW of New Market	Jefferson	TN	36.1311°N 83.6315°W	1911 – 1914	2 mi (3.2 km)	120 yd (110 m)	One home sustained roof damage and numerous trees were downed.
EF0	N of Oakley to ENE of California	St. Mary's	MD	38.278°N 76.740°W	1924 – 1942	13.83 mi (22.26 km)	200 yd (180 m)	Weak, intermittent tornado downed many trees, a few of which fell onto other structures.
EF0	W of North Potomac to Burtonsville	Montgomery	MD	39.08°N 77.32°W	1938 – 1959	20.1 mi (32.3 km)	150 yd (140 m)	Weak, but fast moving and long-tracked tornado downed many trees, several of which fell onto more than 14 homes and several vehicles. The forward speed of the tornado exceeded 60 mph (97 km/h).
EF0	E of Broomes Island	Calvert	MD	38.401°N 76.541°W	1942 – 1945	1.8 mi (2.9 km)	75 yd (69 m)	Intermittent tornado downed several trees and damaged an outbuilding.
EF1	ESE of Sevierville	Sevier	TN	35.7919°N 83.3375°W	1955 – 1956	0.5 mi (0.80 km)	150 yd (140 m)	A home lost part of its roof, an awning was removed from a porch, and many trees were downed.
EF1	W of Mount Sterling	Haywood	NC	35.74°N 83.179°W	2010 – 2012	1.88 mi (3.03 km)	100 yd (91 m)	Hundreds of trees were downed just south of Big Creek along the Deep Creek trail within the Great Smoky Mountains National Park (southwest of the Interstate 40 intersection with the NC/TN border and several miles north-northwest of Maggie Valley). The exact start point is unknown, as much of the path was inaccessible, but the park maintenance crew and a survey team from the University of North Carolina at Asheville determined that the tornado may have either touched down near the Tennessee state line or touched down in Tennessee and crossed the state line. A hiker was injured by a fallen tree and was airlifted to a hospital when he was discovered the next day. This was the first documented F/EF1+ tornado on the North Carolina side of the park.
EF1	Canton	Cherokee	GA	34.2662°N 84.5574°W	2300 – 2325	8.5 mi (13.7 km)	75 yd (69 m)	A Chevron gas station had a portion of its roof peeled back and a blown over gas pump and hundreds of trees were downed. Two people were injured.
EF1	S of Woodstock	Cherokee, Cobb, Fulton	GA	34.0783°N 84.5164°W	2330 – 2343	12.93 mi (20.81 km)	200 yd (180 m)	Dozens of trees were downed, many of which fell onto homes. Roofs at apartment buildings were damaged and netting poles at a golf course driving range were damaged as well, with the netting being ripped off and tangled. The tornado crossed the Chattahoochee River near the Morgan Falls Dam.

=== June 13 event (Western United States) ===
List of confirmed tornadoes – Thursday, June 13, 2013
EF#	Location	County / Parish	State	Start Coord.	Time (UTC)	Path length	Max width	Summary
EF1	McMinnville	Yamhill	OR	45.2176°N 123.1871°W	0032 – 0038	0.25 mi (0.40 km)	53 yd (48 m)	A camper was lifted off of a pickup truck and thrown over a chain-link fence, a large metal building had much of its roof torn off, and 300 pounds (140 kg) trellises were lofted into the air and thrown into a mobile home. Two industrial buildings and a large sign were damaged and several trees were downed.
EF0	E of Elba	Washington	CO	39.92°N 102.90°W	2353	0.1 mi (0.16 km)	50 yd (46 m)	Brief touchdown with no damage.
EF0	N of Akron Airport	Washington	CO	40.26°N 103.21°W	0015	0.1 mi (0.16 km)	50 yd (46 m)	Brief touchdown with no damage.
EF0	NE of Akron Airport	Washington	CO	40.36°N 103.10°W	0032	0.1 mi (0.16 km)	50 yd (46 m)	Brief touchdown with no damage.

=== June 14 event ===
List of confirmed tornadoes – Friday, June 14, 2013
EF#	Location	County / Parish	State	Start Coord.	Time (UTC)	Path length	Max width	Summary
EF0	WNW of Knippa	Uvalde	TX	29.33°N 99.73°W	1450 – 1451	1.9 mi (3.1 km)	50 yd (46 m)	Tornado downed trees and caused roof damage.

=== June 16 event ===
List of confirmed tornadoes – Sunday, June 16, 2013
EF#	Location	County / Parish	State	Start Coord.	Time (UTC)	Path length	Max width	Summary
EF0	NNW of Hyannis	Cherry	NE	42.33°N 101.95°W	2041 – 2042	0.2 mi (0.32 km)	35 yd (32 m)	Brief tornado south of Irwin with no damage.

=== June 17 event ===
List of confirmed tornadoes – Monday, June 17, 2013
EF#	Location	County / Parish	State	Start Coord.	Time (UTC)	Path length	Max width	Summary
EF0	SSW of Stratton	Kit Carson	CO	39.1599°N 102.6544°W	2249 – 2300	0.25 mi (0.40 km)	50 yd (46 m)	Long-lived landspout tornado caused no damage.
EF0	N of La Junta Municipal Airport	Otero	CO	38.072°N 103.532°W	2334 – 2346	6.04 mi (9.72 km)	100 yd (91 m)	No damage was reported.

=== June 18 event ===
List of confirmed tornadoes – Tuesday, June 18, 2013
EF#	Location	County / Parish	State	Start Coord.	Time (UTC)	Path length	Max width	Summary
EF1	Denver International Airport	Denver	CO	39.8263°N 104.6432°W	2021 – 2036	2.4 mi (3.9 km)	75 yd (69 m)	Tornado touched down just south of the airport and moved slowly northward across the property, coming close to the main concourses. An ASOS station measured a gust of 97 mph (156 km/h) before failing after suffering minor damage. Another low-level wind shear sensor measured a peak wind gust of 109 mph (175 km/h).
EF0	W of Winchester	Douglas	OR	43.2799°N 123.4162°W	2230 – 2231	0.1 mi (0.16 km)	10 yd (9.1 m)	Brief tornado picked up a carport that was sheltering a boat and tore it apart, before lifting four-gallon buckets of water (which were used to hold down the carport) and throwing them against the boat and a nearby fence, damaging both. A satellite dish on a house was turned 90 degrees and Christmas lights were pulled down before the tornado moved into a field and dissipated.
EF0	SW of Louisburg	Franklin	NC	35.9757°N 78.3932°W	2230 – 2234	1.25 mi (2.01 km)	150 yd (140 m)	Several manufactured homes had significant roof and siding damage and many trees were downed. Headstones at a cemetery were knocked over as well.

=== June 19 event ===
List of confirmed tornadoes – Wednesday, June 19, 2013
EF#	Location	County / Parish	State	Start Coord.	Time (UTC)	Path length	Max width	Summary
EF0	SSE of Grand Isle	Jefferson	LA	29.2373°N 89.9918°W	2045 – 2046	0.3 mi (0.48 km)	60 yd (55 m)	Waterspout moved onshore, downing power lines and blowing off a portion of a camp's roof.
EF2	NW of Sundown	Hockley	TX	33.4805°N 102.561°W	2232 – 2252	5.2 mi (8.4 km)	350 yd (320 m)	Cone tornado removed the metal roof from a building, shifted another metal building off of its foundation, and bent a free-standing metal tower. Other metal buildings were heavily damaged, two fiberglass tank batteries were damaged (with the top sheared off of one), oil field equipment was destroyed, and more than a dozen power poles were snapped. Many trees were downed as well.

=== June 20 event ===
List of confirmed tornadoes – Thursday, June 20, 2013
EF#	Location	County / Parish	State	Start Coord.	Time (UTC)	Path length	Max width	Summary
EF0	SSE of Leal	Barnes	ND	47.05°N 98.30°W	2311	0.1 mi (0.16 km)	20 yd (18 m)	Small rope tornado with no damage.

=== June 21 event ===
List of confirmed tornadoes – Friday, June 21, 2013
EF#	Location	County / Parish	State	Start Coord.	Time (UTC)	Path length	Max width	Summary
EF0	ESE of Wyoming	Chisago	MN	45.3259°N 92.9915°W	0846 – 0847	0.5 mi (0.80 km)	50 yd (46 m)	Dozens of trees were downed, some of which landed on homes, sheds, and fences.
EF0	N of Miller	Hand	SD	44.66°N 98.99°W	1858 – 1859	0.21 mi (0.34 km)	25 yd (23 m)	Brief touchdown with no damage.
EF0	NW of Carpenter	Clark	SD	44.66°N 97.94°W	1955 – 1957	2.34 mi (3.77 km)	25 yd (23 m)	No damage was reported.
EF0	SW of Osceola	Kingsbury	SD	44.45°N 97.85°W	2003 – 2005	0.1 mi (0.16 km)	50 yd (46 m)	Brief tornado downed a few trees.
EF0	N of Carpenter	Clark	SD	44.71°N 97.91°W	2008 – 2011	0.36 mi (0.58 km)	50 yd (46 m)	Rain-wrapped tornado with inflow winds in excess of 80 mph (130 km/h) caused no damage. The outer inflow winds did down a few trees however.
EF0	W of Erwin	Kingsbury	SD	44.49°N 97.541°W	2010 – 2012	0.1 mi (0.16 km)	50 yd (46 m)	Brief tornado with no damage.
EF0	WNW of Lake Norden	Hamlin	SD	44.61°N 97.30°W	2034 – 2038	0.37 mi (0.60 km)	50 yd (46 m)	Rain-wrapped tornado with no damage.
EF0	W of Brownson	Cheyenne	NE	41.1882°N 103.2032°W	2101 – 2105	0.33 mi (0.53 km)	50 yd (46 m)	Weak tornado south of Potter with no damage.
EF0	SE of Huntsman	Cheyenne	NE	41.21°N 102.97°W	2201 – 2205	0.3 mi (0.48 km)	50 yd (46 m)	Weak tornado north of Sidney with no damage.
EF0	W of Amiret	Lyon	MN	44.32°N 95.731°W	2219 – 2221	0.1 mi (0.16 km)	50 yd (46 m)	Brief tornado with no damage.
EF0	S of Gordon	Sheridan	NE	42.7277°N 102.1888°W	2331 – 2339	0.72 mi (1.16 km)	33 yd (30 m)	Tornado touched down in a corn field and moved southeast, overturning and damaging an irrigation pivot, downing several trees and six power poles, and destroying crops.

=== June 22 event ===
List of confirmed tornadoes – Saturday, June 22, 2013
EF#	Location	County / Parish	State	Start Coord.	Time (UTC)	Path length	Max width	Summary
EF0	S of Wheatland	Platte	WY	41.9776°N 104.97°W	1958 – 1959	0.37 mi (0.60 km)	30 yd (27 m)	Weak tornado in open country with no damage.
EF0	N of Fry	Natrona	WY	42.9562°N 106.0909°W	2006 – 2007	0.08 mi (0.13 km)	20 yd (18 m)	Tornado was photographed northeast of Evansville. No damage was reported.
EF0	SW of Veteran	Goshen	WY	41.8477°N 104.5075°W	2154 – 2157	0.39 mi (0.63 km)	30 yd (27 m)	Weak tornado in open country with no damage.
EF0	N of La Grange	Goshen	WY	41.7168°N 104.17°W	2230 – 2240	4.25 mi (6.84 km)	40 yd (37 m)	Weak tornado uprooted five trees, destroyed a fence, tossed a large metal dumpster, and broke eleven windows.
EF1	NW of Harrisburg	Banner	NE	41.67°N 104.02°W	2250 – 2305	7.87 mi (12.67 km)	100 yd (91 m)	Tornado damaged eight structures and destroyed an outbuilding. The roof was removed from a garage, a two-story home was impacted by flying debris, and sheet metal and wooden boards from outbuildings were blown 50 to 100 yd (46 to 91 m). Several other structures sustained roof damage, seven power poles and numerous trees were downed, and a few irrigation pivots were either flipped or twisted.
EF0	NE of Harrisburg	Banner	NE	41.5807°N 103.709°W	2326 – 2332	1.15 mi (1.85 km)	40 yd (37 m)	Weak tornado moved east across open country before dissipating. No damage was reported.
EF0	E of Dix	Kimball	NE	41.2299°N 103.4798°W	0058 – 0102	0.58 mi (0.93 km)	40 yd (37 m)	Weak tornado moved east along Interstate 80 across open country before dissipating. No damage was reported.
EF1	NNE of Arlington to E of Poynette	Columbia	WI	43.3587°N 89.3523°W	0155 – 0202	3.22 mi (5.18 km)	125 yd (114 m)	Tornado was rain-wrapped while it was on the ground. Several outbuildings were damaged and a 3,000 pounds (1,400 kg) piece of farm equipment was thrown 500 feet (150 m). A couple vehicles were damaged, other farm equipment was scattered around, and a house sustained minor roof and siding damage. Many trees and a few power poles were downed and several corn stalks were broken off.

=== June 24 event ===
List of confirmed tornadoes – Monday, June 24, 2013
EF#	Location	County / Parish	State	Start Coord.	Time (UTC)	Path length	Max width	Summary
EF1	N of Muscatine	Muscatine	IA	41.4456°N 91.0841°W	2008 – 2014	6.5 mi (10.5 km)	100 yd (91 m)	1 death – A church, a car dealership, a hotel, and several other businesses were damaged, as well as several farmsteads. Several trees were downed and five semi trailers were overturned as well. The death occurred at the car dealership.
EF1	NE of Atkinson	Henry	IL	41.4302°N 90.0064°W	2100 – 2105	6.21 mi (9.99 km)	50 yd (46 m)	A grain bin was destroyed, a house sustained roof damage, and several trees and power poles were downed.
EF0	Harmon	Lee	IL	41.6995°N 89.5562°W	2132 – 2136	2.79 mi (4.49 km)	100 yd (91 m)	Tornado touched down south of Harmon and moved across mostly open fields until lifting east-northeast of town. However, several utility poles were downed and a poorly constructed barn was destroyed. A corn canopy was damaged as well.
EF0	NNE of Van Orin	Bureau	IL	41.5642°N 89.3444°W	2133 – 2134	0.63 mi (1.01 km)	75 yd (69 m)	Over a dozen large pine trees were downed, one of which caused minor damage to a house, and corn crops were bent over.
EF0	Pinellas Park	Pinellas	FL	27.8671°N 82.6141°W	0024 – 0040	1.91 mi (3.07 km)	10 yd (9.1 m)	A waterspout developed over Tampa Bay and came onshore near the Weedon Island Power Plant, downing multiple trees, pushing a dock against a house, and damaging a lanai.

=== June 25 event ===
List of confirmed tornadoes – Tuesday, June 25, 2013
EF#	Location	County / Parish	State	Start Coord.	Time (UTC)	Path length	Max width	Summary
EF0	S of Velva	McHenry	ND	47.9542°N 100.93°W	2112 – 2121	1.78 mi (2.86 km)	20 yd (18 m)	Weak tornado with no damage.
EF0	WSW of Birkenfeld	Columbia	OR	46.00°N 123.33°W	2245	Unknown	Unknown	Very weak, brief tornado caused very minor damage to a home and snapped a small tree.
EF0	SE of Mound City	Campbell	SD	45.60°N 99.88°W	0059 – 0100	0.09 mi (0.14 km)	10 yd (9.1 m)	Brief tornado in an open field with no damage.
EF0	NNE of Saint Petersburg Beach	Pinellas	FL	27.719°N 82.7337°W	0100 – 0105	0.14 mi (0.23 km)	5 yd (4.6 m)	Waterspout came ashore and downed power lines before dissipating.
EF0	ENE of Barnesville	Clay	MN	46.65°N 96.42°W	0425 – 0438	7 mi (11 km)	100 yd (91 m)	Intermittent rain-wrapped tornado touched down near Barnesville and lifted a few miles northeast of town. A livestock shed was lifted and collapsed and several trees were downed.

=== June 26 event ===
List of confirmed tornadoes – Wednesday, June 26, 2013
EF#	Location	County / Parish	State	Start Coord.	Time (UTC)	Path length	Max width	Summary
EF0	NW of Vincent	Webster	IA	42.6149°N 94.0476°W	1741 – 1744	0.67 mi (1.08 km)	30 yd (27 m)	Landspout moved slowly southeast and caused no damage.
EF1	ENE of Otwell	Pike	IN	38.45°N 87.10°W	2316 – 2317	0.59 mi (0.95 km)	75 yd (69 m)	A 40 by 80 feet (12 m × 24 m) wooden equipment storage shed was destroyed.
EF1	Tell City	Perry	IN	37.9888°N 86.7921°W	0129 – 0138	5.26 mi (8.47 km)	100 yd (91 m)	Several structures suffered minor roof damage and small outbuildings were damaged. A semi trailer was overturned and a few amusement rides at a carnival were blown sideways. Numerous trees were downed as well.
EF2	NW of Hodgenville to W of New Haven	LaRue	KY	37.6212°N 85.7988°W	0325 – 0336	6.65 mi (10.70 km)	300 yd (270 m)	High-end EF2 tornado ripped the roof off of a metal building and threw it 100 to 150 yd (91 to 137 m), bent in the doors of the building, and strewn insulation everywhere. A large RV inside a shed was blown onto its side and the shed itself was destroyed. A two-story pole barn and a metal livestock building were destroyed and a house was damaged. A silo was crumbled, some parts of a corn field were mashed down, a one-room school house was destroyed, and several barns were destroyed. A two-story house lost its entire roof and a shed was blown over. Many trees were downed along the path.

=== June 27 event ===
List of confirmed tornadoes – Thursday, June 27, 2013
EF#	Location	County / Parish	State	Start Coord.	Time (UTC)	Path length	Max width	Summary
EF1	Toboyne Township	Perry	PA	40.2637°N 77.6453°W	1819 – 1824	3.02 mi (4.86 km)	50 yd (46 m)	Tornado touched down in the Tuscarora State Forest and traveled intermittently along Pennsylvania Route 274. A barn sustained roof damage and about 75 trees were downed, one of which fell on a cabin.
EF1	Boalsburg	Centre	PA	40.7811°N 77.7402°W	2005 – 2007	1 mi (1.6 km)	75 yd (69 m)	Tornado touched down over the north-northeastern part of Boalsburg, in the area of U.S. Highway 322. A small tree was lofted 50 ft (15 m) in the air and metal roofing was torn off of several outbuildings and a corn crib. Several other trees were downed and debris was scattered in a corn field.

=== June 29 event ===
List of confirmed tornadoes – Saturday, June 29, 2013
EF#	Location	County / Parish	State	Start Coord.	Time (UTC)	Path length	Max width	Summary
EF0	W of Cooks Mills	Coles	IL	39.5781°N 88.4143°W	1905 – 1906	0.14 mi (0.23 km)	20 yd (18 m)	Brief tornado caused minor damage to the siding and gutters of a home, damaged a garage door, and knocked down several trees.
EF0	SW of Socastee	Horry	SC	33.6466°N 79.0416°W	2015 – 2016	0.11 mi (0.18 km)	30 yd (27 m)	Brief, very weak tornado caused mainly minor roof, siding, and window damage to six homes. However, framing on a house that was under construction collapsed, and vinyl siding, soffit trim, fencing, patio furniture and an air compressor were damaged.
EF0	Northwestern Socastee	Horry	SC	33.6998°N 79.0091°W	2026 – 2027	0.07 mi (0.11 km)	50 yd (46 m)	Very brief and weak tornado in the northwestern part of town caused minor roof, siding, and soffit damage to four homes and downed a few trees.

== July ==
Confirmed tornadoes by Enhanced Fujita rating
EFU	EF0	EF1	EF2	EF3	EF4	EF5	Total
0	51	19	2	0	0	0	72

=== July 1 event ===
List of confirmed tornadoes – Monday, July 1, 2013
EF#	Location	County / Parish	State	Start Coord.	Time (UTC)	Path length	Max width	Summary
EF0	Berkeley Heights/Summit	Union	NJ	40.6822°N 74.4528°W	1317 – 1325	4.77 mi (7.68 km)	50 yd (46 m)	Many trees were downed along the path, some of which fell onto cars and houses.
EF0	NW of Downtown Stamford	Fairfield	CT	41.10°N 73.63°W	1458 – 1508	3.7 mi (6.0 km)	150 yd (140 m)	Tornado touched down along the Merritt Parkway and moved east-northeast, downing many trees and blowing the door off of a barn.
EF1	Windsor to East Windsor	Hartford	CT	41.90°N 72.65°W	1728 – 1735	2.07 mi (3.33 km)	200 yd (180 m)	The tornado touched down in the far northern part of Windsor, blowing the roof off of a warehouse and downing numerous trees, some of which fell onto cars and houses. The tornado moved into the southern part of Windsor Locks, where shingles were blown off of houses, tobacco tents were ripped off of fields, and tobacco crop was flattened. After crossing the Connecticut River, the storm moved into East Windsor and hit the Sports World Complex, causing a sports bubble to collapse and be thrown onto Interstate 91. Additionally, a tractor trailer was overturned on Interstate 91; however, this may have not been directly related to the tornado.
EF0	ESE of Enfield	Hartford	CT	41.98°N 72.52°W	1745 – 1747	0.86 mi (1.38 km)	50 yd (46 m)	Weak tornado formed from the same storm that produced the Windsor tornado, downing a few trees before lifting.
EF0	Safety Harbor	Pinellas	FL	28.0209°N 82.6655°W	2150 – 2152	0.06 mi (0.097 km)	20 yd (18 m)	A nearly stationary waterspout moved onshore, causing shingle damage to a home and downing a few trees and a mailbox. A guy-wire was snapped as well.
EF0	SSE of Clinton	Prince George's	MD	38.7045°N 76.9004°W	2333 – 2334	2.3 mi (3.7 km)	75 yd (69 m)	Very weak tornado toppled trees, snapped 6 to 12 inches (15 to 30 cm) in diameter tree limbs, and caused very minor vinyl fence damage. Flashing was peeled off of a house as well.
EF0	NE of Bellmont	Wabash	IL	38.3963°N 87.8887°W	0041 – 0042	0.8 mi (1.3 km)	50 yd (46 m)	Weak tornado impacted a grove of trees, downing a few and lofting branches into the air.

=== July 2 event ===
List of confirmed tornadoes – Tuesday, July 2, 2013
EF#	Location	County / Parish	State	Start Coord.	Time (UTC)	Path length	Max width	Summary
EF0	NW of Roxboro	Person	NC	36.5130°N 79.0828°W	1625 – 1627	0.43 mi (0.69 km)	180 yd (160 m)	Tornado destroyed a covered boat dock on Hyco Lake and caused moderate damage to nearby covered docks and homes. Damage to those structures was mostly limited to roofs; however, a multi-story balcony was uplifted and damaged on one home. Dozens of trees were downed along the path as well.
EF1	ENE of Florence	Florence	SC	34.1919°N 79.71°W	2259 – 2310	3.08 mi (4.96 km)	90 yd (82 m)	Tornado touched down near Florence Regional Airport and moved northeast, downing trees before moving into more populated areas. A couple homes were damaged in one subdivision, with one home losing about 30 percent of its roof. Tracking generally northward, the storm then moved into a mobile home park where it destroyed 10 homes and damaged 20 others (two of which sustained major damage). Nine people were hospitalized for injuries, two of whom had to be extricated from their homes. More trees were downed and a fence was damaged as the tornado continued northward until dissipating northwest of Mars Bluff.
EF0	NE of Fairfield	Wayne	IL	38.45°N 88.2781°W	2355 – 2356	0.67 mi (1.08 km)	50 yd (46 m)	An unusual tornado that began as a column of fog before rotating briefly touched down, causing minor vegetation aggravation.

=== July 5 event ===
List of confirmed tornadoes – Friday, July 5, 2013
EF#	Location	County / Parish	State	Start Coord.	Time (UTC)	Path length	Max width	Summary
EF0	SW of Seminole	Okaloosa	FL	30.4659°N 86.4311°W	1900 – 1903	0.29 mi (0.47 km)	40 yd (37 m)	A waterspout formed over Choctawhatchee Bay and briefly moved onshore, causing minor roof damage to a few buildings before quickly dissipating.

=== July 6 event ===
List of confirmed tornadoes – Saturday, July 6, 2013
EF#	Location	County / Parish	State	Start Coord.	Time (UTC)	Path length	Max width	Summary
EF0	S of Trigg Furnace	Trigg	KY	36.8525°N 87.9311°W	0050 – 0051	0.89 mi (1.43 km)	50 yd (46 m)	Weak tornado moved into Lake Barkley State Resort Park, where large trees and tree limbs were blown onto power lines.

=== July 7 event ===
List of confirmed tornadoes – Sunday, July 7, 2013
EF#	Location	County / Parish	State	Start Coord.	Time (UTC)	Path length	Max width	Summary
EF0	WSW of Wardboro	Bear Lake	ID	42.2334°N 111.3242°W	0130 – 0145	1 mi (1.6 km)	10 yd (9.1 m)	Brief tornado touched down over an open field and was photographed by the public. It caused no damage.

=== July 8 event ===
List of confirmed tornadoes – Monday, July 8, 2013
EF#	Location	County / Parish	State	Start Coord.	Time (UTC)	Path length	Max width	Summary
EF0	NE of Melstone	Musselshell	MT	46.61°N 107.87°W	2248 – 2258	0.5 mi (0.80 km)	50 yd (46 m)	Tornado remained over open areas and caused no damage. However, strong outflow winds caused minor tree and structural damage in Melstone.
EF1	SE of Ulmer	Custer	MT	46.2425°N 105.759°W	0054 – 0110	0.57 mi (0.92 km)	100 yd (91 m)	Brief "spin-up" tornado south of Miles City caused major structural damage to homes, barns, and garages, with several roofs and the side of a house being blown off, among other things. Dozens of large trees 12 to 16 inches (30 to 41 cm) in diameter were uprooted, tree limbs were thrown long distances, twelve power poles were knocked down, an irrigation pipe system was thrown several hundred feet, and a camper was overturned.
EF0	SE of Kansas	Seneca	OH	41.2394°N 83.2783°W	0102 – 0103	0.05 mi (0.080 km)	15 yd (14 m)	Very brief tornado removed the roof from a mobile home, caused roof damage to a barn, and overturned a camper. Many trees were downed and corn was flattened in a field as well.

=== July 9 event ===
List of confirmed tornadoes – Tuesday, July 9, 2013
EF#	Location	County / Parish	State	Start Coord.	Time (UTC)	Path length	Max width	Summary
EF0	S of Irma	Lincoln	WI	45.285°N 89.692°W	1959 – 2004	4.1 mi (6.6 km)	100 yd (91 m)	Several trees and power lines were downed.
EF0	S of Parrish to W of Deerbrook	Langlade	WI	45.264°N 89.425°W	2032 – 2056	9.52 mi (15.32 km)	100 yd (91 m)	Weak tornado moved along an intermittent path, downing trees and power lines.
EF0	NNE of Judson	Morton	ND	46.91°N 101.26°W	2054 – 2057	1.84 mi (2.96 km)	50 yd (46 m)	Three barns and two sheds were either damaged or destroyed at a farmstead.
EF0	S of Oconto	Custer	NE	41.0783°N 99.7844°W	2210 – 2215	0.01 mi (0.016 km)	20 yd (18 m)	Very brief tornado touched down in an open field and caused no damage.
EF0	WNW of Buffalo	Dawson	NE	41.0242°N 99.9537°W	2214 – 2224	1.72 mi (2.77 km)	50 yd (46 m)	Landspout tornado caused no damage.
EF0	WSW of Oconto	Custer	NE	41.0983°N 99.9091°W	2215 – 2225	0.22 mi (0.35 km)	75 yd (69 m)	Brief tornado south of Callaway caused no damage.
EF0	Palmetto	Manatee	FL	27.523°N 82.595°W	2233 – 2235	0.23 mi (0.37 km)	15 yd (14 m)	Brief tornado damage seven mobile homes, three of which sustained moderate to heavy damage. One person was injured.
EF0	S of Bancroft	Portage	WI	44.259°N 89.529°W	2244 – 2245	0.16 mi (0.26 km)	25 yd (23 m)	Brief touchdown in an open field with no damage.
EF1	NNE of Oconto	Oconto	WI	44.942°N 87.857°W	0050 – 0054	1.58 mi (2.54 km)	100 yd (91 m)	A few homes suffered minor roof damage, an RV trailer was blown over, and trees and power lines were downed.

=== July 10 event ===
List of confirmed tornadoes – Wednesday, July 10, 2013
EF#	Location	County / Parish	State	Start Coord.	Time (UTC)	Path length	Max width	Summary
EF1	South Peru	Miami	IN	40.7463°N 86.1131°W	1728 – 1733	3.47 mi (5.58 km)	200 yd (180 m)	Many trees were downed on the south side of town, several of which fell onto houses and caused roof and structural damage. Several businesses suffered roof and façade damage as well. Two people were injured, one when her car was flipped.
EF1	NE of Republic to SE of Bellevue	Seneca, Huron	OH	41.1391°N 82.9392°W	1824 – 1837	10.15 mi (16.33 km)	50 yd (46 m)	Several houses lost sections of roofing, one home had a partial collapse of a second-story wall, and a garage that was attached to a home lost a door and was lifted from its foundation. Many trees were downed along the intermittent path as well.
EF0	Southern Bellevue	Sandusky	OH	41.2654°N 82.8606°W	1913 – 1915	0.8 mi (1.3 km)	50 yd (46 m)	Many homes sustained minor roof and siding damage, a door on a garage that was attached to a home was blown in, and fencing on the second story porch of a home was destroyed. Many trees were downed as well, some of which fell onto houses.
EF0	NW of Rowsburg	Ashland	OH	40.8658°N 82.1741°W	1956 – 1959	1.03 mi (1.66 km)	15 yd (14 m)	Small, intermittent tornado embedded in a larger area of straight-line winds toppled a barn (killing five livestock and injuring several others) and downed numerous trees, a few of which caused heavy damage to a house. The damage to the barn was found to be a combination of both the tornado and the straight-line winds, as were crops that were flattened in fields.
EF0	N of Johnson	Stanton	KS	37.679°N 101.7612°W	2003 – 2008	0.15 mi (0.24 km)	50 yd (46 m)	Weak landspout tornado caused no damage.
EF1	SW of Moravia	Lawrence	PA	40.90°N 80.40°W	2042 – 2043	1.16 mi (1.87 km)	250 yd (230 m)	Brief tornado that was caught on camera destroyed a barn, removed the roof from another barn, flipped over a gravity wagon in a field, and downed several trees.
EF1	S of Bolivar to SW of Dellroy	Tuscarawas, Carroll	OH	40.632°N 81.447°W	2044 – 2100	13.35 mi (21.48 km)	300 yd (270 m)	The tornado touched down south of Bolivar and moved southeastward, where many trees were downed. It moved into Mineral City and uplifted the roof of a fire station, as well as collapsing cinder-block walls. Several houses in town suffered roof and window damage and numerous trees were downed. The tornado continued southeastward, downing many more trees, including several hundred in one area, before the tornado lifted in west-central Carroll County.
EF1	NNW of Perrysville to SE of Kilgore	Carroll	OH	40.493°N 81.112°W	2107 – 2119	9.06 mi (14.58 km)	150 yd (140 m)	The front porch roof of a house was broken off and lofted over the house, the roof of a grain silo was destroyed, and an outbuilding was rolled. Hundreds of trees were downed as well.
EF1	Andover to Mansfield	Tolland	CT	41.72°N 72.41°W	2120 – 2151	10.87 mi (17.49 km)	100 yd (91 m)	Intermittent tornado downed numerous trees and tore apart/damaged a sheet metal barn.

=== July 12 event ===
List of confirmed tornadoes – Friday, July 12, 2013
EF#	Location	County / Parish	State	Start Coord.	Time (UTC)	Path length	Max width	Summary
EF0	ESE of Cayuga	Sargent	ND	46.06°N 97.35°W	0045 – 0046	0.1 mi (0.16 km)	20 yd (18 m)	Brief tornado kicked up dust but caused no damage.

=== July 13 event ===
List of confirmed tornadoes – Saturday, July 13, 2013
EF#	Location	County / Parish	State	Start Coord.	Time (UTC)	Path length	Max width	Summary
EF0	ESE of Frogmore	Beaufort	SC	32.38°N 80.46°W	1301 – 1305	0.01 mi (0.016 km)	25 yd (23 m)	A waterspout moved onto Hunting Island, but moved back out over the water and dissipated without causing any damage.

=== July 15 event ===
List of confirmed tornadoes – Monday, July 15, 2013
EF#	Location	County / Parish	State	Start Coord.	Time (UTC)	Path length	Max width	Summary
EF2	N of Wolf Point to NW of Brockton	Roosevelt	MT	48.3511°N 105.6108°W	2145 – 2250	22.99 mi (37.00 km)	440 yd (400 m)	Long-lived tornado tracked across rural areas of the Fort Peck Indian Reservation in Roosevelt County. Upon touchdown, the tornado debarked and snapped limbs off a dead tree. Tracking generally eastward, the tornado damaged a power line and blew over an unanchored shed. It then downed several trees, scattered debris from a dump site, and bent/broke two metal road signs. 1,200-to-1,500-pound (540 to 680 kg) round hay bales were thrown into a tree line as well. The greatest damage occurred 10 miles (16 km) east of Highway 13 at a farm where damage was estimated at low-end EF2. A portion of the roof was removed from a barn, the walls were caved in, and 4x4s that held up the walls were sheared about 4 feet (1.2 m) off the ground, and its walls caved in. A nearby storage building was overturned and blown into a quonset, destroying both. Pieces of concrete footing from the storage building were pulled out of the ground and tossed onto farm equipment, and another Quonset lost part of its metal roofing. Power poles just southeast of the farm were damaged as well. The tornado moved across the Poplar River valley, snapping nine power poles, moving irrigation pipes, and downing a cottonwood tree. Just north of this location, rear flank downdraft winds ripped the roof off of a section of a well-constructed metal building. The tornado later dissipated about 19 miles (31 km) east of Highway 13 after remaining on the ground just over one hour.
EF0	Lakewood Ranch	Manatee	FL	27.4229°N 82.4158°W	2240 – 2250	1.2 mi (1.9 km)	5 yd (4.6 m)	Very small tornado caused no damage.
EF0	Winslow	Navajo	AZ	35.0269°N 110.6903°W	0200	0.1 mi (0.16 km)	10 yd (9.1 m)	A brief tornado touched down at the Winslow City Park and caused no damage.

=== July 17 event ===
List of confirmed tornadoes – Wednesday, July 17, 2013
EF#	Location	County / Parish	State	Start Coord.	Time (UTC)	Path length	Max width	Summary
EF0	NNW of Danforth	Washington	ME	45.668°N 67.877°W	2248 – 2249	0.15 mi (0.24 km)	50 yd (46 m)	Brief tornado embedded in a larger area of straight-line winds destroyed a metal shed.

=== July 19 event ===
List of confirmed tornadoes – Friday, July 19, 2013
EF#	Location	County / Parish	State	Start Coord.	Time (UTC)	Path length	Max width	Summary
EF1	ESE of Chamberlain Lake	Piscataquis	ME	46.203°N 69.10°W	1800 – 1805	2.14 mi (3.44 km)	300 yd (270 m)	Tornado embedded in a larger area of straight-line winds produced extensive tree damage.
EF0	Pompano Beach	Broward	FL	26.2358°N 80.0883°W	1945	0.1 mi (0.16 km)	10 yd (9.1 m)	A waterspout moved onshore at the Pompano Beach Fishing Pier during a lifeguard competition, blowing down tents. Three people sustained minor injuries.
EF0	N of Amsterdam	Carroll	OH	40.5086°N 80.9494°W	2107 – 2109	0.63 mi (1.01 km)	175 yd (160 m)	A tree fell on the roof of a porch, destroying the whole porch. Power lines were downed as well.
EF0	NE of Hilton	Monroe	NY	43.3243°N 77.7165°W	2331 – 2333	0.28 mi (0.45 km)	10 yd (9.1 m)	A waterspout moved out of Lake Ontario, across a small section of Braddock Point, and into Braddock Bay, where it dissipated. There was no damage.

=== July 20 event ===
List of confirmed tornadoes – Saturday, July 20, 2013
EF#	Location	County / Parish	State	Start Coord.	Time (UTC)	Path length	Max width	Summary
EF1	Pepper Pike	Cuyahoga	OH	41.5005°N 81.4685°W	0735 – 0738	1.34 mi (2.16 km)	200 yd (180 m)	High-end EF1 tornado embedded in a larger area of straight-line winds touched down northwest of Ursuline College and moved across a portion of the campus, causing substantial roof and wall damage to the college's gymnasium. Elsewhere along the path, trees were downed and a few structures suffered minor roof damage.
EF0	SE of Rushville	Sheridan	NE	42.60°N 102.34°W	2326 – 2336	0.1 mi (0.16 km)	60 yd (55 m)	Stationary tornado over open rangeland caused no damage.

=== July 21 event ===
List of confirmed tornadoes – Sunday, July 21, 2013
EF#	Location	County / Parish	State	Start Coord.	Time (UTC)	Path length	Max width	Summary
EF0	S of Riverdale	St. Johns	FL	29.80°N 81.55°W	1830	0.05 mi (0.080 km)	20 yd (18 m)	Waterspout moved onshore and quickly dissipated without causing damage.
EF0	NNW of Granville	McHenry	ND	48.36°N 100.90°W	2242 – 2251	4.55 mi (7.32 km)	50 yd (46 m)	An aircraft pilot observed this tornado in contact with the ground. No damage was reported.
EF0	Eastern Springfield	Greene	MO	37.2074°N 93.272°W	0018 – 0019	0.62 mi (1.00 km)	50 yd (46 m)	Very weak landspout tornado caused minor roof and window damage to several homes and businesses and downed several trees and power lines.
EF1	SE of Starkweather	Ramsey	ND	48.44°N 98.88°W	0208 – 0211	1.5 mi (2.4 km)	100 yd (91 m)	Six wooden power poles were snapped.

=== July 22 event ===
List of confirmed tornadoes – Monday, July 22, 2013
EF#	Location	County / Parish	State	Start Coord.	Time (UTC)	Path length	Max width	Summary
EF1	N of Trail to W of Berner	Polk, Clearwater	MN	47.80°N 95.70°W	0633 – 0650	7.47 mi (12.02 km)	150 yd (140 m)	Many trees were downed.
EF2	ESE of Mahnomen to WNW of Zerkel	Mahnomen, Clearwater	MN	47.30°N 95.91°W	0650 – 0730	21.09 mi (33.94 km)	400 yd (370 m)	Intermittent tornado destroyed a pole barn, damaged a home and several other buildings, and lofted farm equipment. It also downed many crops and trees.
EF0	NW of Augusta	Eau Claire	WI	44.662°N 91.2045°W	2145 – 2146	0.29 mi (0.47 km)	10 yd (9.1 m)	Apple and oak trees were downed and corn crops were flattened.
EF0	NW of Trempealeau	Trempealeau	WI	44.0418°N 91.5535°W	2215 – 2220	1.1 mi (1.8 km)	40 yd (37 m)	Tornado downed several trees in the Trempealeau National Wildlife Refuge, west-southwest of Centerville. It started over marshlands on the northern side of the Mississippi River as a waterspout and only had an overland path length of 0.25 to 0.5 miles (0.40 to 0.80 km). Several water plants were thrown and found on roads in the refuge as well.
EF0	ENE of Pensacola Beach	Escambia	FL	30.3871°N 86.9909°W	2330 – 2331	0.01 mi (0.016 km)	30 yd (27 m)	Waterspout came ashore and downed trees and power lines before quickly dissipating.

=== July 23 event ===
List of confirmed tornadoes – Tuesday, July 23, 2013
EF#	Location	County / Parish	State	Start Coord.	Time (UTC)	Path length	Max width	Summary
EF0	E of Darlington	Harford	MD	39.628°N 76.182°W	0412 – 0413	0.8 mi (1.3 km)	100 yd (91 m)	A pole barn was destroyed, a house had roof, siding, and insulation removed, and many trees and crops were downed.
EF0	ENE of Plantation	Broward	FL	26.0874°N 80.1748°W	1645 – 1646	0.01 mi (0.016 km)	10 yd (9.1 m)	Brief tornado damaged dinghies and watercraft: boats were either just damaged or completely overturned in a marina and six catamarans were damaged. A power line was downed and flashing was torn from a building as well.
EF0	SW of Summitville	Carroll, Columbiana	OH	40.694°N 80.943°W	2122 – 2128	3.15 mi (5.07 km)	75 yd (69 m)	Tornado touched down north-northeast of Norristown and east-northeast of Augusta and traveled southeastward before dissipating east of Five Forks. A grain silo lost its roof, a small barn was damaged, a trampoline was wrapped around a power pole, and a metal television antenna was blown away and not found. Many trees were downed as well. Elsewhere, shingles were removed from two barns and impaled into the ground and a 1-mile (1.6 km) wide swath of trees were downed due to rear flank downdraft.

=== July 24 event ===
List of confirmed tornadoes – Wednesday, July 24, 2013
EF#	Location	County / Parish	State	Start Coord.	Time (UTC)	Path length	Max width	Summary
EF1	SW of Wagoner	Wagoner	OK	35.9597°N 95.4247°W	0506 – 0512	3.5 mi (5.6 km)	850 yd (780 m)	The tornado touched down west of Wagoner, initially downing a few trees and causing minor damage to outbuildings, before becoming stronger and causing roof and siding damage to two commercial buildings and several houses. A few barns were either damaged or destroyed and portions of two wood-framed storage units were destroyed in this area as well. As the tornado moved southeast, more homes and businesses received minor roof damage, a travel trailer was thrown 35 yd (32 m), and roof damage was done to an apartment complex before the tornado dissipated south of Wagoner. Many trees were downed along the path.

=== July 25 event ===
List of confirmed tornadoes – Thursday, July 25, 2013
EF#	Location	County / Parish	State	Start Coord.	Time (UTC)	Path length	Max width	Summary
EF0	S of Granada	Prowers	CO	37.67°N 102.38°W	2020 – 2050	1.09 mi (1.75 km)	100 yd (91 m)	Tornado occurred over open country and caused no damage.
EF0	S of Coolidge	Hamilton	KS	37.86°N 101.98°W	2105 – 2110	0.41 mi (0.66 km)	50 yd (46 m)	A trained storm spotter observed a landspout tornado; it did not cause damage.
EF0	SE of Two Buttes	Baca	CO	37.51°N 102.30°W	2109 – 2115	1.1 mi (1.8 km)	75 yd (69 m)	Tornado occurred over open country and caused no damage.

=== July 26 event ===
List of confirmed tornadoes – Friday, July 26, 2013
EF#	Location	County / Parish	State	Start Coord.	Time (UTC)	Path length	Max width	Summary
EF0	S of Kingston	Marshall	OK	33.943°N 96.731°W	2025	0.1 mi (0.16 km)	10 yd (9.1 m)	A tornado was photographed near Lake Texoma; no known damage occurred.
EF0	SE of Waverly	Lafayette	MO	39.1893°N 93.4904°W	2250 – 2251	0.05 mi (0.080 km)	25 yd (23 m)	Mostly stationary landspout tornado downed a few trees and caused shingle damage to the roof of a home.

=== July 27 event ===
List of confirmed tornadoes – Saturday, July 27, 2013
EF#	Location	County / Parish	State	Start Coord.	Time (UTC)	Path length	Max width	Summary
EF1	Hall Summit	Red River	LA	32.22°N 93.45°W	0533 – 0552	9.97 mi (16.05 km)	1,760 yd (1,610 m)	Large, intermittent high-end EF1 tornado touched down west-northwest of Hall Summit (just east of the Red River) and moved generally east-southeastward, lifting just east-southeast of town. Many trees were downed, a few of which caused significant roof damage to a house.
EF1	WSW of Borie	Potter	PA	41.6767°N 77.9897°W	2100 – 2106	2.94 mi (4.73 km)	200 yd (180 m)	Intermittent tornado south of Coudersport in Homer Township downed around 100 trees, a few of which fell onto two homes.
EF1	SW of Troupsburg to NW of Rathbone	Steuben	NY	42.05°N 77.55°W	2210 – 2240	14 mi (23 km)	500 yd (460 m)	Intermittent tornado touched down three times along its path, destroying a barn and a greenhouse, blowing siding off of a trailer/mobile home, snapping a few power poles, and downing many trees.

=== July 29 event ===
List of confirmed tornadoes – Monday, July 29, 2013
EF#	Location	County / Parish	State	Start Coord.	Time (UTC)	Path length	Max width	Summary
EF0	ESE of Preston	Pratt	KS	37.74°N 98.49°W	2118 – 2119	0.01 mi (0.016 km)	25 yd (0.023 km)	An emergency manager reported a brief tornado.
EF1	SW of Uniontown	Bourbon	KS	37.7909°N 95.0653°W	2205 – 2206	0.4 mi (0.64 km)	100 yd (0.091 km)	Brief tornado inside Bourbon County State Park uprooted trees and shifted a mobile home 4 feet (1.2 m) off of its foundation, causing severe exterior damage. A couple outbuildings/small barns were destroyed and a pontoon boat was lifted and thrown 10 yards (9.1 m).
EF0	E of Federal	Laramie	WY	41.27°N 105.05°W	0003 – 0010	1.25 mi (2.01 km)	50 yd (0.046 km)	Dust was lofted into the air but no damage was reported.

=== July 30 event ===
List of confirmed tornadoes – Tuesday, July 30, 2013
EF#	Location	County / Parish	State	Start Coord.	Time (UTC)	Path length	Max width	Summary
EF0	WSW of Philip	Haakon	SD	44.0262°N 101.7165°W	2135	0.01 mi (0.016 km)	10 yd (0.0091 km)	Brief, small tornado touched down in a field and caused no damage.

=== July 31 event ===
List of confirmed tornadoes – Wednesday, July 31, 2013
EF#	Location	County / Parish	State	Start Coord.	Time (UTC)	Path length	Max width	Summary
EF0	SW of West Lake	Hamilton	FL	30.42°N 83.18°W	2335	0.01 mi (0.016 km)	10 yd (0.0091 km)	Brief tornado northwest of the Suwannee River State Park caused no damage.

== See also ==
- Tornadoes of 2013
- List of United States tornadoes in May 2013
- List of United States tornadoes from August to October 2013
