= Thisted (disambiguation) =

Thisted is a town in Denmark.

Thisted may also refer to:

- Thisted (surname)
- Thisted Brewery
- Thisted (nomination district)
- Thisted Parish
- Lake Thisted
- Thisted Airport
- Thisted Broad , part of Limfjord
- Thisted County
- Thisted FC
- Thisted Municipality
- Thisted railway station
