= Plum Lake (disambiguation) =

Plum Lake may refer to:

- Plum Lake, Wisconsin, a town
- Plum Lake (Jackson County, Minnesota)
- Plum Lake (South Dakota)
- Plum Lakes, a group of lakes in Manitoba
