= Spring Lake Colony, South Dakota =

- Census-designated place
- Location within South Dakota Location within the United States
- Coordinates: 44°14′12″N 97°10′34″W
- Country: United States
- State: South Dakota
- County: Kingsbury

Area
  - Total: 0.29 sq mi (0.74 km^{2})
  - Land: 0.29 sq mi (0.74 km^{2})
  - Water: 0 sq mi (0.00 km^{2})
- Elevation: 1,772 ft (540 m)

Population (2020)
  - Total: 121
  - Density: 423.9/sq mi (163.65/km^{2})
- Time zone: UTC-6 (Central (CST))
  - Summer (DST): UTC-5 (CDT)
- ZIP Code: 57212 (Arlington)
- Area code: 605
- FIPS code: 46-60958
- GNIS feature ID: 2813039

Spring Lake Colony is a Hutterite colony and census-designated place (CDP) in Kingsbury County, South Dakota, United States. It was first listed as a CDP prior to the 2020 census. As of the 2020 census, Spring Lake Colony had a population of 121.

It is in the southeast part of the county, 1 mile (1.6 km) east of a lake of the same name. The colony is 7 miles (11 km) east of Oldham and 11 miles (18 km) south-southwest of Arlington.

== Demographics ==
Historical population
| Census | Pop. | Note | %± |
|---|---|---|---|
| 2020 | 121 | | — |
U.S. Decennial Census
