= Eugene Peter Knudsen =

American politician (1915–1981)

Eugene Peter Knudsen (March 10, 1915 – September 1, 1981) was an American politician and farmer.

Knudsen was born in Badger, Kingsbury County, South Dakota. He grew up in Kandiyohi, Kandiyohi County, Minnesota and lived with his wife and family on a farm in Kandiyohi, Minnesota. He went to public school in Kandiyohi, Minnesota. Knudsen was a farmer and raised cattle. He served on the Kandiyohi School Board from 1946 to 1954 and was the chair of the school board. Knudsen served in the Minnesota House of Representatives from 1955 to 1962 and in the Minnesota Senate from 1963 to 1966. In 1979, he moved to Spicer, Minnesota. Knudsen died from a heart attack in Kandiyohi, Minnesota while doing carpentry work.
