= Melham =

Melham may refer to:

- Daryl Melham, an Australian politician
- Melham, South Dakota, a community in the United States
- melham, the verb
