= Spirit Lake (South Dakota) =

Lake in the state of South Dakota, United States

- Location within South Dakota Location within the United States
- Location: Kingsbury County, South Dakota
- Coordinates: 44°29′35″N 97°36′31″W
- Basin countries: United States
- Surface area: 1,260 acres (5.1 km^{2})
- Max. depth: 10.5 ft (3.2 m)
- Shore length^{1}: 6.3 miles (10.1 km)
- Surface elevation: 1,720 feet (520 m)
- ^{1} Shore length is not a well-defined measure.

Spirit Lake is a natural lake in Kingsbury County, South Dakota, in the United States. The lake is seven miles north of De Smet and US Route 14 and six miles east of Bancroft. The smaller Mud Lake lies just to the southeast.

The lake received its name either due to the area being an Indian burial ground, or a transfer from Spirit Lake, Iowa.

== See also ==
- List of lakes in South Dakota
