= E. Klein Graff =

American politician

Member of the South Dakota House of Representatives
- In office 1967–1968

Personal details
- Born: March 1, 1896
- Died: August 18, 1982 (aged 86)
- Party: Republican
- Spouse: Berdene Francis Campbell (m. 1920)
- Children: 5

E. Klein Graff (March 1, 1896 – August 18, 1982) was an American politician. He served as a Republican member of the South Dakota House of Representatives.

== Life and career ==
Graff was born on March 1, 1896, on a farm near Rutland, South Dakota.

Graff served in the United States Army during World War I. He was a lobbyist.

In 1967, Graff was elected to the South Dakota House of Representatives, representing Minnehaha County, South Dakota, serving until 1968.

Graff died in August 1982 at the Royal C. Johnson Veterans Memorial Hospital, at the age of 86.
