= Esmond Methodist Episcopal Church and Township Hall =

Historic church in South Dakota, United States

- U.S. National Register of Historic Places
- Location within South Dakota Location within the United States
- Location: Northeast corner of Center St. and Elm St., Esmond, South Dakota
- Coordinates: 44°15′53″N 97°46′19″W
- Area: less than one acre
- Built: 1885
- Architect: Frank Hoppin
- Architectural style: Late Victorian
- NRHP reference No.: 06000666
- Added to NRHP: August 2, 2006

The Esmond Methodist Episcopal Church and Township Hall are two historic buildings at the junction of Center Street and Elm Street in Esmond, South Dakota. They were added to the National Register of Historic Places in 2006.

The church was built in 1885 and was expanded in 1927. The Township Hall was built in 1893.

By 2006, the town had disappeared, except for two houses and these two buildings.
