= Rutland, South Dakota =

- Unincorporated community
- Location within South Dakota Location within the United States
- Coordinates: 44°5′20″N 96°58′1″W
- Country: United States
- State: South Dakota
- County: Lake
- Elevation: 1,660 ft (510 m)
- Time zone: UTC-6 (Central (CST))
  - Summer (DST): UTC-5 (CDT)
- ZIP code: 57057
- Area code: 605
- GNIS feature ID: 1257529

Rutland is an unincorporated community in Lake County, South Dakota, United States.

Rutland was founded in 1905, and named after Rutland Township by Richard F. Pettigrew, a surveyor and politician from Sioux Falls.

There is a veterinary clinic in the town, which was formerly a small gas station called the "Rambler Stop", named after the original Rutland School sports team name, the "Ramblers".

== Education ==
Rutland is served by the Oldham-Ramona-Rutland School District (ORR), which has a single Pre-K through 12 school located in the town as well

Previously the community was in the Rutland School District 39-4. It consolidated into ORR in 2023.

== Notable people ==
- E. Klein Graff, former member of the South Dakota House of Representatives
