= Melham, South Dakota =

Unincorporated community in South Dakota, U.S.

Coordinates: 44°33′27″N 97°41′11″W

Melham is an extinct town in Clark County, South Dakota that was founded in 1910 but nothing of which survived to the start of the 21st century except the partial ruins of one building. It had a post office on the GNR 7 miles (11 km) north of Bancroft.

In 1921 it had an estimated population of 50, a grain elevator run by the Dakota Farmers Co-operative Elevator Company, a general store, a cafe, a garage, and a bank.

A post office named Melham was in operation until 1932, named after John Melham of Watertown, a businessperson in the lumber industry. The town itself had prior to 1916 been variously named Collinsburg, after a colonel Fred W. Collins; Gallagerville, after Jack Gallagher, a settler; La Boreville, after Bruns La Bore, a farmer; Midway, simply because it was the GNR stop midway between Willow Lake and Bancroft; Phelps, after a worker on the railroad; and Tango, because the town had once had a dance hall.

The GNR discontinued its station agent on 1931-07-30 because of falling revenue. In 1932 the GNR showed that the total annual revenue for all freight, inbound and outbound, had been US$133.53 (equivalent to $3,077 in 2024) and that only a single car-load of outbound freight had been shipped all year, and thus the station was ordered closed entirely on 1933-04-01. By 1940, the population was down to 20 people.
