= Lake Whitewood =

Lake in the state of South Dakota, United States

- Location within South Dakota
- Location: Kingsbury County, South Dakota
- Coordinates: 44°19′57″N 97°18′19″W
- Type: lake
- Basin countries: United States
- Surface elevation: 1,693 ft (516 m)

Lake Whitewood is a natural lake in Kingsbury County, South Dakota, in the United States.

Lake Whitewood received its name from the white timber near the lake.

== See also ==
- List of lakes in South Dakota
