= Lake Albert (Kingsbury County, South Dakota) =

Lake in the state of South Dakota, United States

- Location within South Dakota
- Location: South Dakota
- Coordinates: 44°32′00″N 97°09′27″W
- Type: lakes
- Basin countries: United States
- Surface elevation: 1,654 ft (504 m)

Lake Albert is a lake in South Dakota, in the United States. It is on the border of Kingsbury County and Hamlin County.

Lake Albert was named after John James Abert, a cartographer of the American West. According to a Federal Writers’ Project volume on South Dakota place names, “The present name is a corruption of ‘Abert.’”

== See also ==
- List of lakes in South Dakota
