= Oldham Methodist Church =

Historic church in South Dakota, United States

- U.S. National Register of Historic Places
- Location within South Dakota Location within the United States
- Location: Main St. and Epton Ave., Oldham, South Dakota
- Coordinates: 44°13′41″N 97°18′40″W
- Area: less than one acre
- Built: 1914
- Built by: Peterson, P.E.
- NRHP reference No.: 87001728
- Added to NRHP: September 25, 1987

The Oldham Methodist Church is a historic church at Main Street and Epton Avenue in Oldham, South Dakota, USA. It was built in 1914 and was added to the National Register in 1987.

It has an L-shaped plan with a bell tower rising from the intersection of its two gables. It was deemed notable as a "rare, practically uncorrupted example" of "the L-shaped form in its pure state. Other original features include Gothic arched window and door openings, decorative bargeboard, hardwood interior appointments and furniture, lighting fixtures, and a pressed-metal ceiling."
