= Redstone Creek (South Dakota) =

Stream in South Dakota, U.S.

Coordinates: 44°03′25″N 98°04′57″W

Redstone Creek is a stream in Clark, Kingsbury, Miner and Sanborn counties in the U.S. state of South Dakota.

Redstone Creek was named for the reddish tint of the rock within its watercourse.

== See also ==
- List of rivers of South Dakota
