= Kandiyohi, Minnesota =

City in Minnesota, United States

Kandiyohi
- City
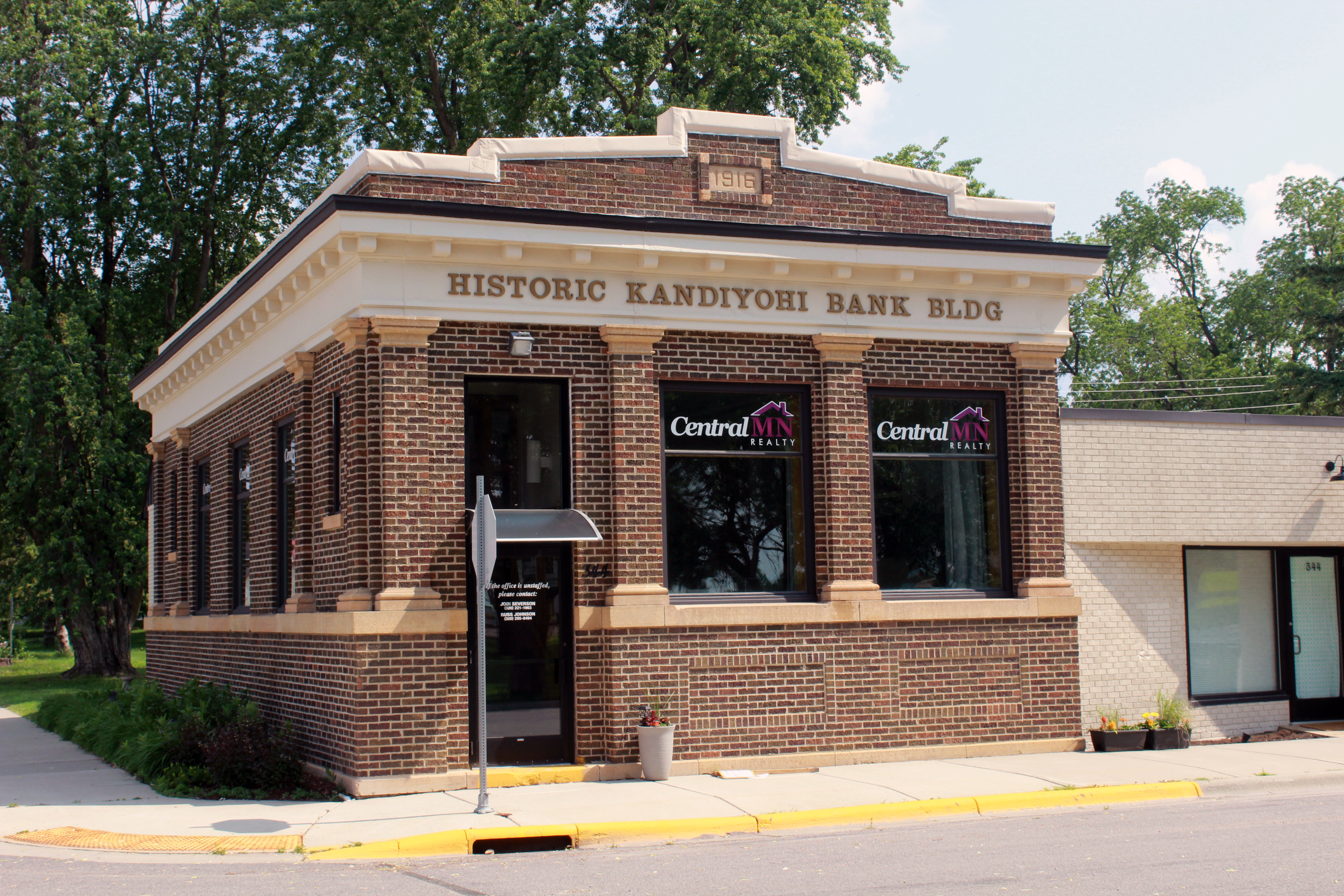
- Historic Kandiyohi Bank

- Location of Kandiyohi, Minnesota
- Coordinates: 45°07′53″N 94°55′58″W
- Country: United States
- State: Minnesota
- County: Kandiyohi

Area
  - Total: 0.39 sq mi (1.01 km^{2})
  - Land: 0.39 sq mi (1.01 km^{2})
  - Water: 0 sq mi (0.00 km^{2})
- Elevation: 1,221 ft (372 m)

Population (2020)
  - Total: 569
  - Density: 1,457.0/sq mi (562.55/km^{2})
- Time zone: UTC-6 (Central (CST))
  - Summer (DST): UTC-5 (CDT)
- ZIP code: 56251
- Area code: 320
- FIPS code: 27-32372
- GNIS feature ID: 2395488
- Website: https://cityofkandiyohimn.gov/

Kandiyohi (/ˌkændiˈjoʊhaɪ/ KAN-dee-YOH-hy) is a city in Kandiyohi County, Minnesota, United States. The population was 569 at the 2020 census.

== History ==
Kandiyohi was laid out in 1869, when the railroad was extended to that point. In 1869 the Minnesota legislature voted Kandiyohi to be the new state capital due to its central location. The bill was vetoed by governor William Rainey Marshall on the grounds that "[t]he western treeless districts" further out from Kandiyohi would place the capital away from the likely population center.

Kandiyohi was derived from a Sioux name meaning "where the buffalo fish come from".

== Geography ==
According to the United States Census Bureau, the city has a total area of 0.34 square miles (0.88 km^{2}), all land. Including five family-friendly parks.

U.S. Route 12 serves as a main route in the community.

== Demographics ==
Historical population
Census	Pop.	Note	%±
1880	75		—
1910	185		—
1920	184		−0.5%
1930	192		4.3%
1940	271		41.1%
1950	293		8.1%
1960	312		6.5%
1970	295		−5.4%
1980	447		51.5%
1990	506		13.2%
2000	555		9.7%
2010	491		−11.5%
2020	569		15.9%
U.S. Decennial Census

=== 2010 census ===
As of the census of 2010, there were 491 people, 202 households, and 130 families living in the city. The population density was 1,444.1 inhabitants per square mile (557.6/km^{2}). There were 233 housing units at an average density of 685.3 per square mile (264.6/km^{2}). The racial makeup of the city was 92.5% White, 0.4% Native American, 0.4% Asian, 3.5% from other races, and 3.3% from two or more races. Hispanic or Latino of any race were 5.7% of the population.

There were 202 households, of which 33.7% had children under the age of 18 living with them, 53.0% were married couples living together, 9.4% had a female householder with no husband present, 2.0% had a male householder with no wife present, and 35.6% were non-families. 28.7% of all households were made up of individuals, and 8.9% had someone living alone who was 65 years of age or older. The average household size was 2.42 and the average family size was 3.02.

The median age in the city was 32.6 years. 28.1% of residents were under the age of 18; 9.8% were between the ages of 18 and 24; 26.2% were from 25 to 44; 24.4% were from 45 to 64; and 11.4% were 65 years of age or older. The gender makeup of the city was 50.5% male and 49.5% female.

=== 2000 census ===
As of the census of 2000, there were 555 people, 215 households, and 147 families living in the city. The population density was 1,754.2 inhabitants per square mile (677.3/km^{2}). There were 228 housing units at an average density of 720.7 per square mile (278.3/km^{2}). The racial makeup of the city was 97.84% White, 0.54% African American, 0.18% Native American, 0.18% Asian, 0.90% from other races, and 0.36% from two or more races. Hispanic or Latino of any race were 1.62% of the population.

There were 215 households, out of which 40.5% had children under the age of 18 living with them, 57.2% were married couples living together, 7.9% had a female householder with no husband present, and 31.2% were non-families. 24.7% of all households were made up of individuals, and 9.8% had someone living alone who was 65 years of age or older. The average household size was 2.57 and the average family size was 3.09.

In the city, the population was spread out, with 29.5% under the age of 18, 15.9% from 18 to 24, 27.9% from 25 to 44, 15.5% from 45 to 64, and 11.2% who were 65 years of age or older. The median age was 28 years. For every 100 females, there were 92.7 males. For every 100 females age 18 and over, there were 91.7 males.

The median income for a household in the city was $36,364, and the median income for a family was $52,500. Males had a median income of $32,045 versus $19,659 for females. The per capita income for the city was $15,897. About 3.4% of families and 5.2% of the population were below the poverty line, including 1.3% of those under age 18 and 6.5% of those age 65 or over.

== Notable people ==
- Mary Lou Freeman, Iowa state legislator, was born in Kandiyohi.
- Eugene Peter Knudsen, Minnesota state legislator and farmer, lived in Kandiyohi.

== Gallery ==
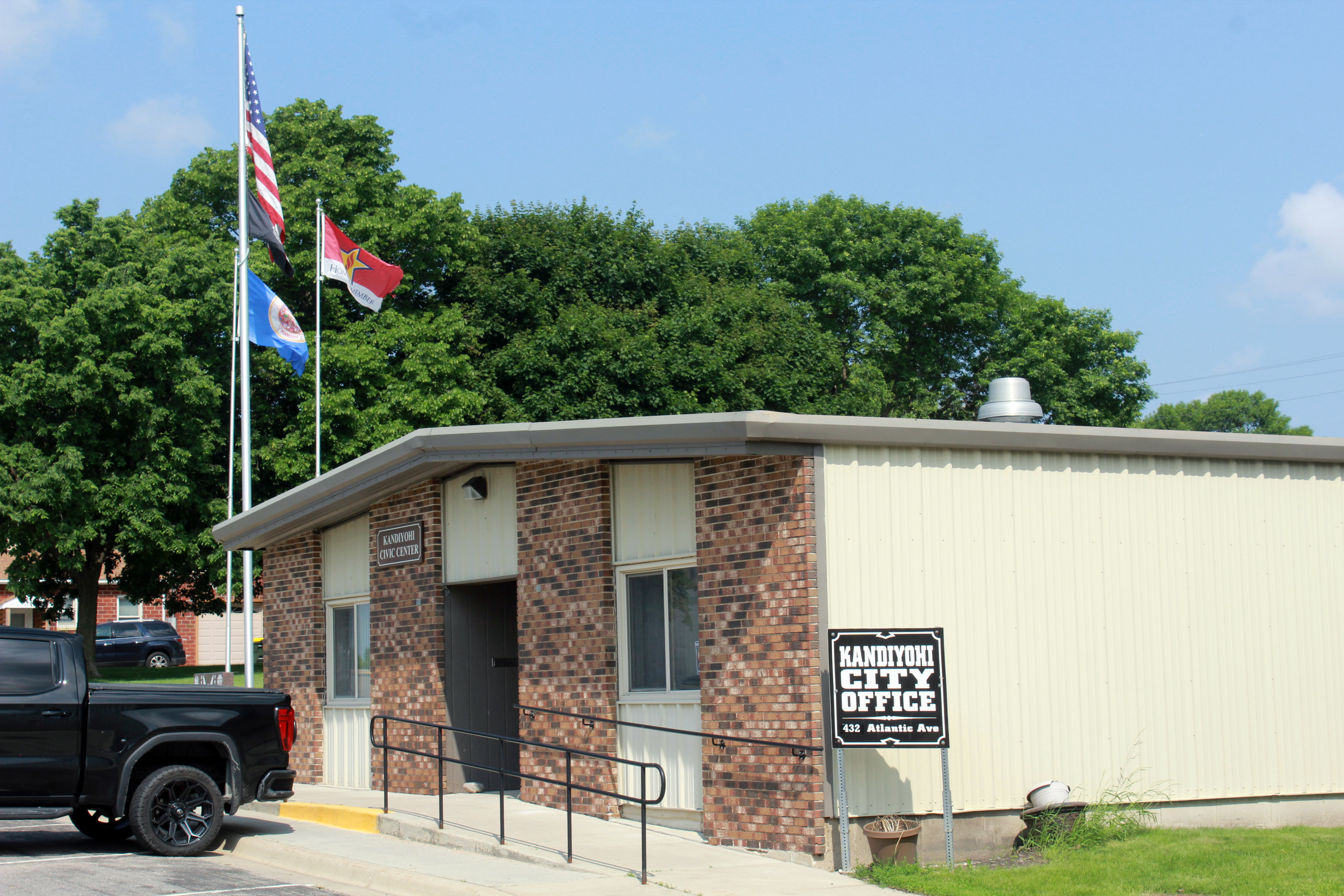
City Offices

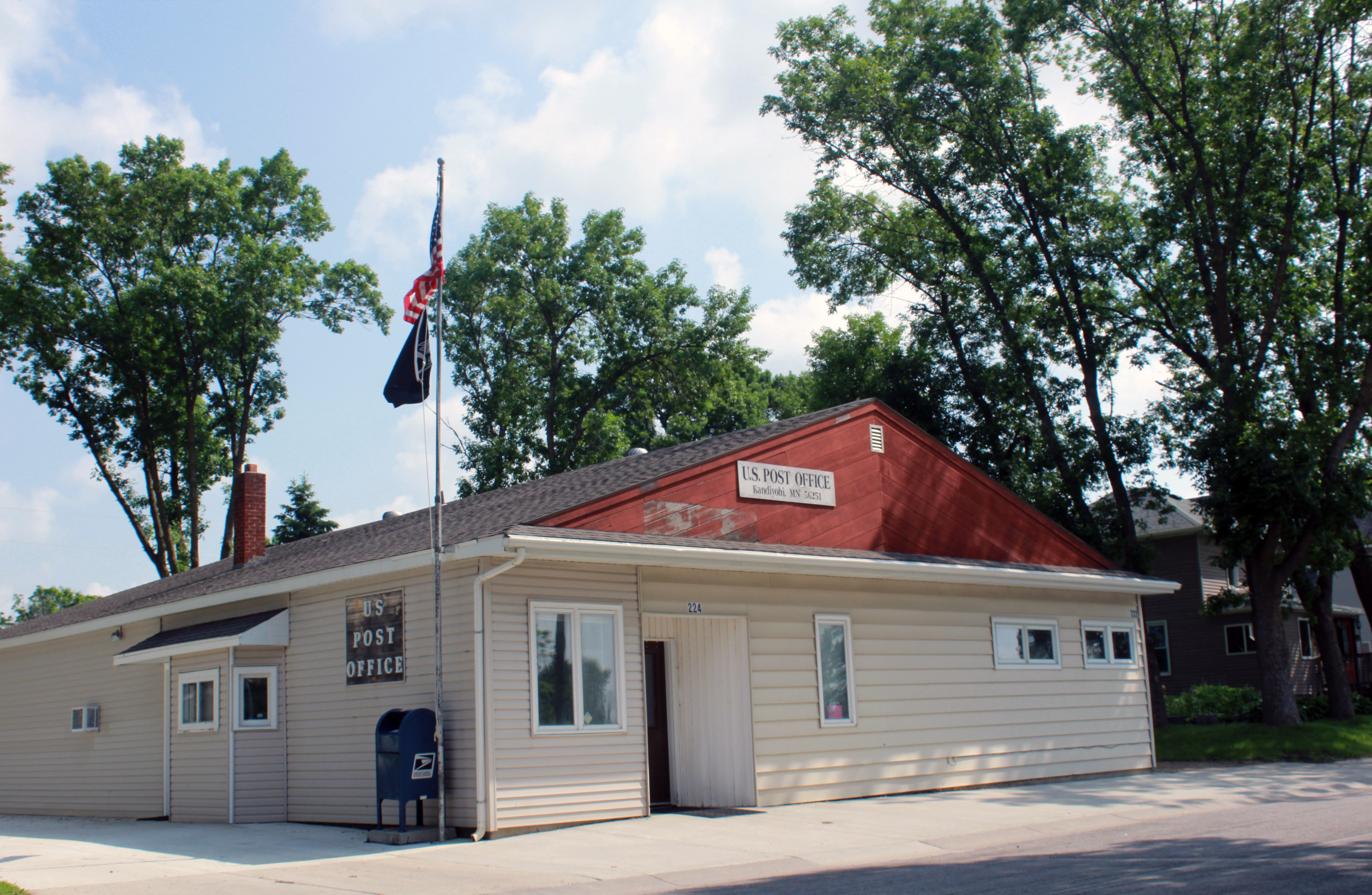
Post office

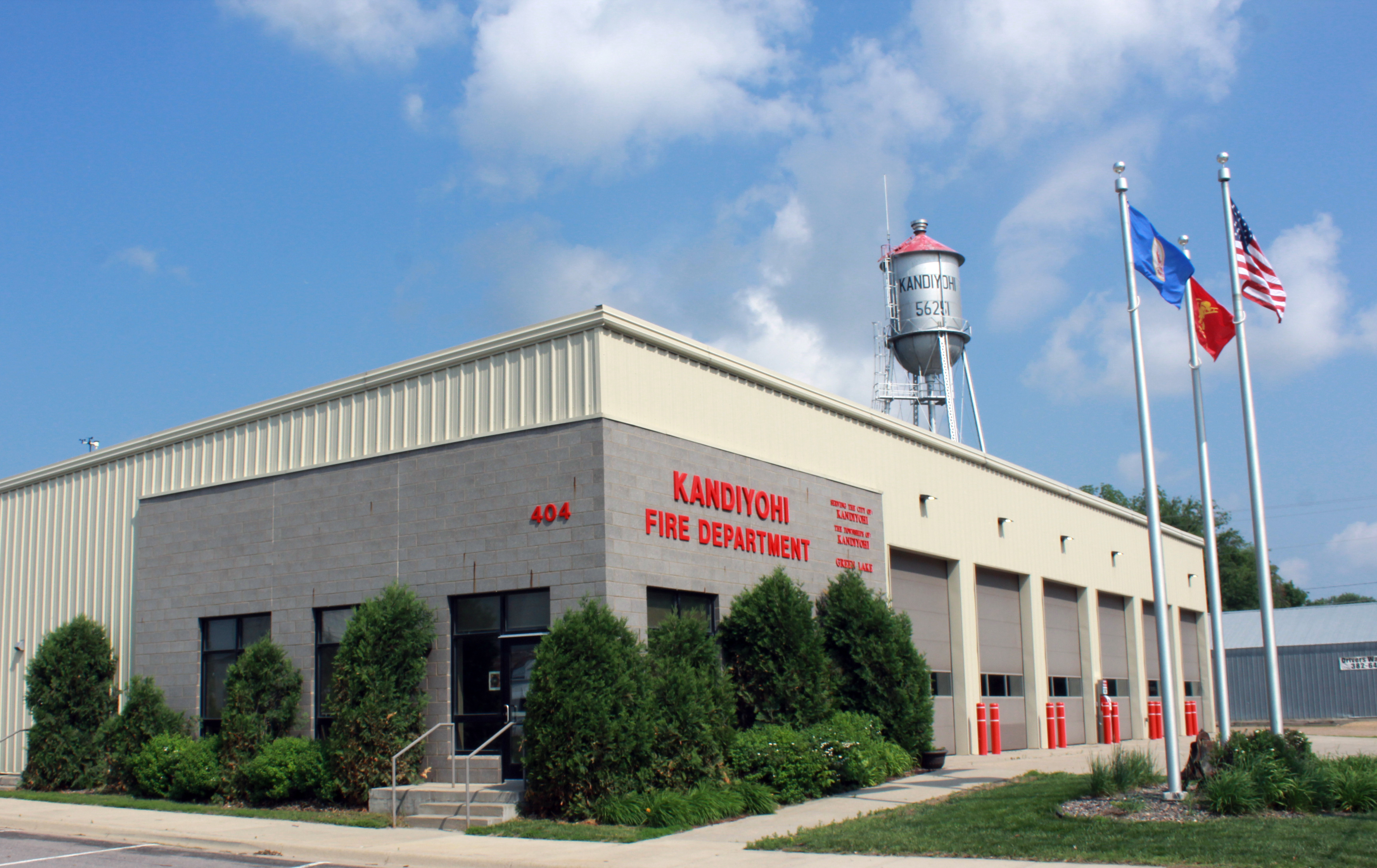
Fire Station and water tower
