= Osceola, South Dakota =

Unincorporated community in South Dakota, U.S.

Coordinates: 44°28′03″N 97°50′19″W

Osceola is an unincorporated community in western Kingsbury County, South Dakota, US, on the South Fork Pearl River approximately six miles southwest of Bancroft.

== History ==
A post office called Osceola was established in 1888, and remained in operation until 1960. The community takes its name after Osceola, Iowa, the native home of a share of the early settlers.
