= Thisted (surname) =

Thisted is a Danish surname associated with the Danish town of Thisted. Notable people with the surname include:

- Jeff Thisted (born 1968), American game show host
- Karen Thisted (1946–2020), Danish journalist and writer
- Poul Hagen Thisted, Danish person kidnapped by Somali pirates
- P. Thisted Knudsen (1904–1974) Danish lawyer and politician, M.P.
- Valdemar Adolph Thisted (1815–1887), Danish writer, translator and priest
