= Plum Lake (South Dakota) =

Lake in the state of South Dakota, United States

- Location within South Dakota
- Location: Kingsbury County, South Dakota
- Coordinates: 44°31′20″N 97°30′0″W
- Type: lake
- Basin countries: United States
- Surface elevation: 1,765 ft (538 m)

Plum Lake is a natural lake in Kingsbury County, South Dakota, in the United States.

Plum Lake received its name from the plum trees which lined the lake.

== See also ==
- List of lakes in South Dakota
