= Huntsman, Nebraska =

Unincorporated community in Nebraska, U.S.

Coordinates: 41°13′15″N 102°58′26″W

Huntsman is an unincorporated community in Cheyenne County, Nebraska, United States.

== History ==
A post office was established at Huntsman in 1919, and remained in operation until it was discontinued in 1934.
