= Erwin, South Dakota =

- Town
- Location in Kingsbury County and the state of South Dakota
- Coordinates: 44°29′17″N 97°26′27″W
- Country: United States
- State: South Dakota
- County: Kingsbury
- Platted: 1887

Area
  - Total: 0.47 sq mi (1.23 km^{2})
  - Land: 0.47 sq mi (1.23 km^{2})
  - Water: 0 sq mi (0.00 km^{2})
- Elevation: 1,860 ft (570 m)

Population (2020)
  - Total: 40
  - Density: 84.0/sq mi (32.44/km^{2})
- Time zone: UTC-6 (Central (CST))
  - Summer (DST): UTC-5 (CDT)
- ZIP code: 57233
- Area code: 605
- FIPS code: 46-19860
- GNIS feature ID: 1267381

Erwin is a town in Kingsbury County, South Dakota, United States. As of the 2020 census, Erwin had a population of 40.

== History ==
A post office has been in operation at Erwin since 1882. The town site was platted in 1887. James Irwin Hollister, an early postmaster, gave the town his name.

== Geography ==
According to the United States Census Bureau, the town has a total area of 0.48 square miles (1.24 km^{2}), all land.

== Demographics ==
Historical population
Census	Pop.	Note	%±
1900	131		—
1910	230		75.6%
1920	257		11.7%
1930	205		−20.2%
1940	182		−11.2%
1950	153		−15.9%
1960	157		2.6%
1970	106		−32.5%
1980	66		−37.7%
1990	42		−36.4%
2000	58		38.1%
2010	45		−22.4%
2020	40		−11.1%
U.S. Decennial Census

=== 2010 census ===
As of the census of 2010, there were 45 people, 22 households, and 15 families residing in the town. The population density was 93.8 inhabitants per square mile (36.2/km^{2}). There were 29 housing units at an average density of 60.4 per square mile (23.3/km^{2}). The racial makeup of the town was 97.8% White and 2.2% from two or more races. Hispanic or Latino of any race were 6.7% of the population.

There were 22 households, of which 13.6% had children under the age of 18 living with them, 54.5% were married couples living together, 9.1% had a female householder with no husband present, 4.5% had a male householder with no wife present, and 31.8% were non-families. 31.8% of all households were made up of individuals, and 13.6% had someone living alone who was 65 years of age or older. The average household size was 2.05 and the average family size was 2.53.

The median age in the town was 59.5 years. 22.2% of residents were under the age of 18; 2.1% were between the ages of 18 and 24; 6.6% were from 25 to 44; 28.9% were from 45 to 64; and 40% were 65 years of age or older. The gender makeup of the town was 51.1% male and 48.9% female.

=== 2000 census ===
As of the census of 2000, there were 58 people, 26 households, and 17 families residing in the town. The population density was 123.1 inhabitants per square mile (47.5/km^{2}). There were 34 housing units at an average density of 72.2 per square mile (27.9/km^{2}). The racial makeup of the town was 100.00% White.

There were 26 households, out of which 19.2% had children under the age of 18 living with them, 65.4% were married couples living together, 3.8% had a female householder with no husband present, and 30.8% were non-families. 26.9% of all households were made up of individuals, and 23.1% had someone living alone who was 65 years of age or older. The average household size was 2.23 and the average family size was 2.72.

In the town, the population was spread out, with 22.4% under the age of 18, 1.7% from 18 to 24, 12.1% from 25 to 44, 34.5% from 45 to 64, and 29.3% who were 65 years of age or older. The median age was 52 years. For every 100 females, there were 81.3 males. For every 100 females age 18 and over, there were 87.5 males.

The median income for a household in the town was $33,125, and the median income for a family was $33,125. Males had a median income of $18,750 versus $16,875 for females. The per capita income for the town was $15,661. None of the population or families were below the poverty line.
