= Bank of the Iroquois Building =

- U.S. National Register of Historic Places
- Location within South Dakota Location within the United States
- Location: Junction of Washita and Quapaw Sts., Iroquois, South Dakota
- Coordinates: 44°22′01″N 97°51′01″W
- Area: less than one acre
- Built: 1887
- Architectural style: Italianate
- NRHP reference No.: 02000576
- Added to NRHP: May 30, 2002

The Bank of the Iroquois Building, at the corner of Washita and Quapaw Sts. in Iroquois, South Dakota, was built in 1887. It was listed on the National Register of Historic Places in 2002.

It is Italianate in style. It has also been known as Farmers and Merchants Bank and as Hoevet Funeral Home. It is a two-story brick building on a foundation built of granite, quartzite and limestone cobbles. It has a flat roof with parapet.
