= Adam and Minnie Royhl House =

Historic house in South Dakota, United States

- U.S. National Register of Historic Places
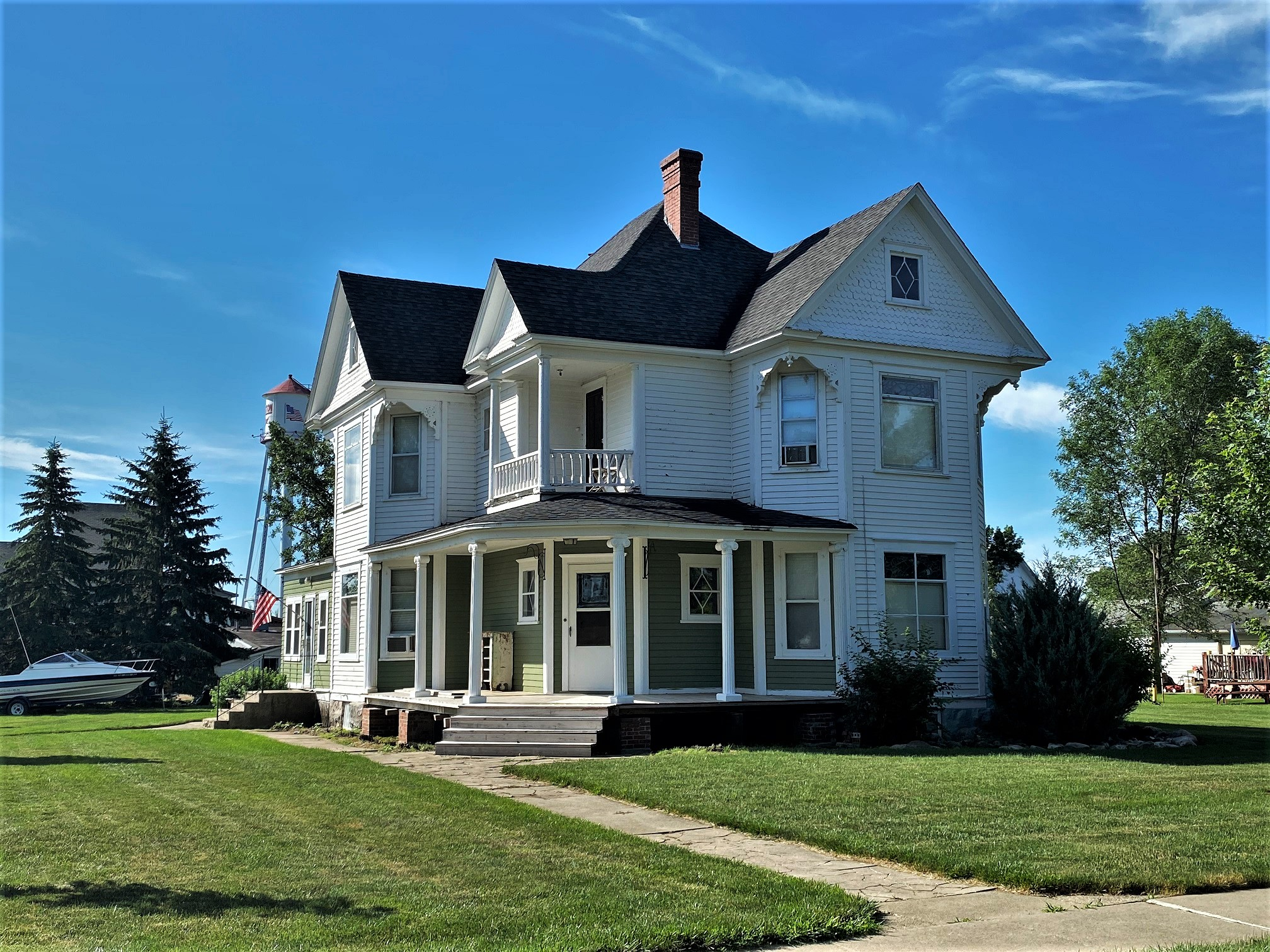
- The Royhl House in 2020

- Location within South Dakota Location within the United States
- Location: 203 S. Third St. Arlington, South Dakota
- Coordinates: 44°21′47″N 97°8′12″W
- Area: less than one acre
- Built: 1902
- Built by: Ole Shaw
- Architectural style: Queen Anne
- NRHP reference No.: 01000638
- Added to NRHP: June 6, 2001

The Adam and Minnie Royhl House, located at 203 S. Third St. in Arlington, South Dakota, is a Queen Anne-style house built in 1902. It was listed on the National Register of Historic Places in 2001.

It was notable for being an "excellent example" of Victorian architecture.

The house has also been known as the Arlington Skandinavien Lutheran Parsonage.
