= Oldham-Ramona-Rutland School District 39-6 =

School district in South Dakota, United States

Oldham-Ramona-Rutland School District 39-6 (ORR) is a school district with school sites in Rutland and Ramona in South Dakota. The district has portions of territory in Kingsbury, Lake, Miner, and Moody counties.

It formed as a consolidation of the Oldham-Ramona School District 39-5 and the Rutland School District 39-4 in 2023. Those two districts began partnerships in athletics in the 1990s. The Oldham and Ramona districts had merged in 1990. The American Association of School Administrators stated that due to the fact the school districts were at about 150 students each when South Dakota law required those under 100 to consolidate, the decision for the two to do so "was obvious".

School in the consolidated district began on August 21, 2023.

The district had plans to create a new school. A petition was submitted that sought to have the district broken up into pieces instead.

There was a 2025 referendum on whether the school district should dissolve and be broken up into pieces. The recount vote tally returned 367 votes to retain the district and 362 to dissolve it.
