= Plum Lake (Jackson County, Minnesota) =

Lake in the state of Minnesota, United States

- Location within Minnesota
- Location: Jackson County, Minnesota
- Coordinates: 43°33′27″N 95°23′17″W
- Type: lake

Plum Lake is a lake in Jackson County, Minnesota, United States.

Plum Lake was named for the wild plum trees on its lake island.

== See also ==
- List of lakes in Minnesota
