= Thomas H. Ruth House =

United States historic place

- U.S. National Register of Historic Places
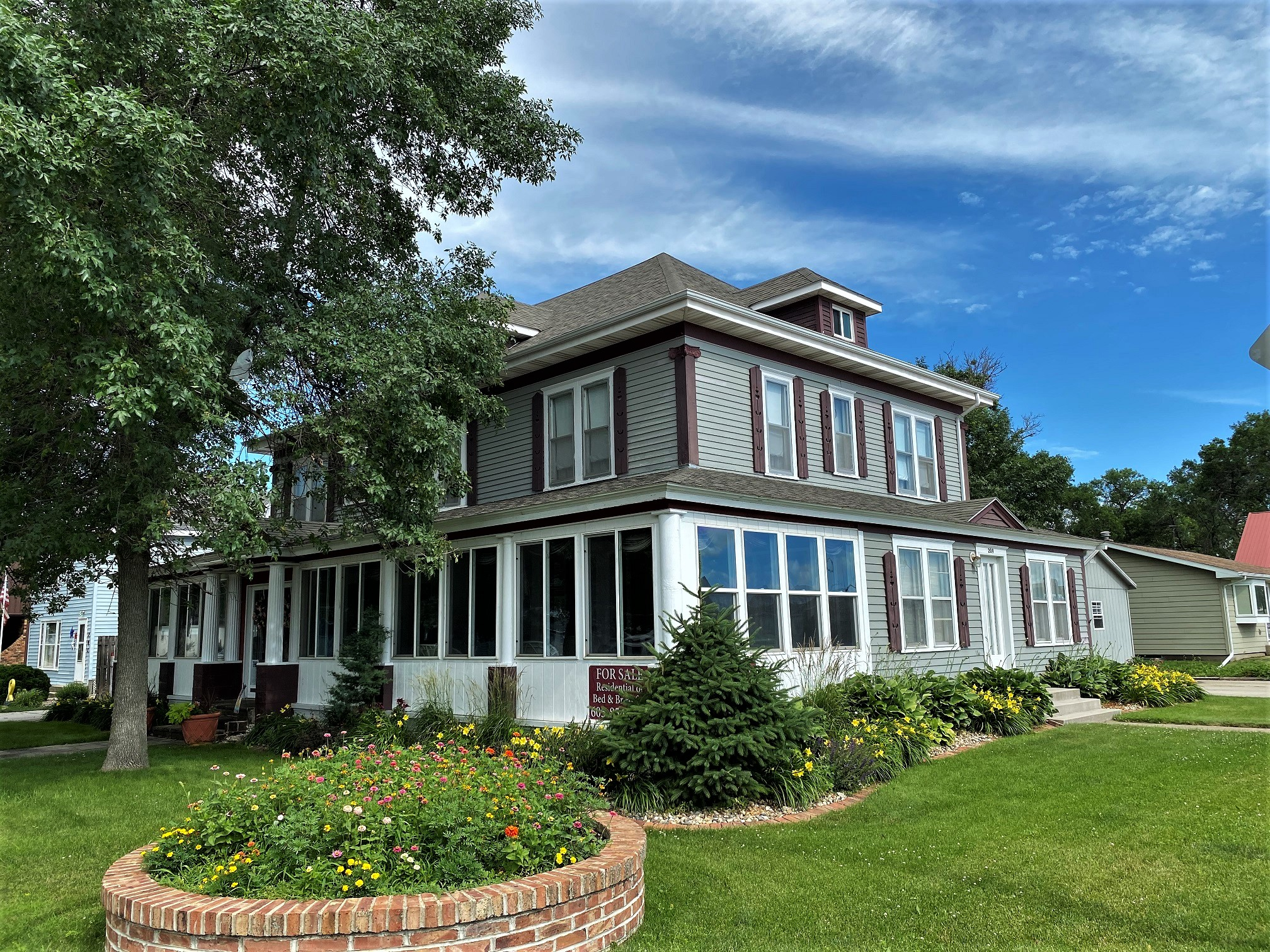

- Location within South Dakota Location within the United States
- Location: 209 Poinset Ave. DeSmet, South Dakota
- Coordinates: 44°23′03″N 97°33′05″W
- Area: less than one acre
- Built: 1900
- Architectural style: Colonial Revival
- NRHP reference No.: 99000212
- Added to NRHP: February 12, 1999

The Thomas H. Ruth House, at 209 Poinset Ave. in DeSmet, South Dakota, was built in 1900. It was listed on the National Register of Historic Places in 1999.

It is a two-story house located on the corner of South Dakota Highway 45 (Poinset Ave) and 3rd Street. It was built as a single residence in 1900. In 1929 it was remodeled and divided into apartments.

It has also been known as the Prairie House Manor Bed & Breakfast.
