= Lake Thisted =

Lake in the state of South Dakota, United States

- Location within South Dakota
- Location: Kingsbury County, South Dakota
- Coordinates: 44°28′31″N 97°09′07″W
- Type: lake
- Basin countries: United States
- Surface elevation: 1,667 ft (508 m)

Lake Thisted is a natural lake in Kingsbury County, South Dakota, in the United States.

Lake Thisted takes its name from Thisted, Denmark, the native land of a first settler.

== See also ==
- List of lakes in South Dakota
