= Kingsbury County Courthouse =

- U.S. National Register of Historic Places
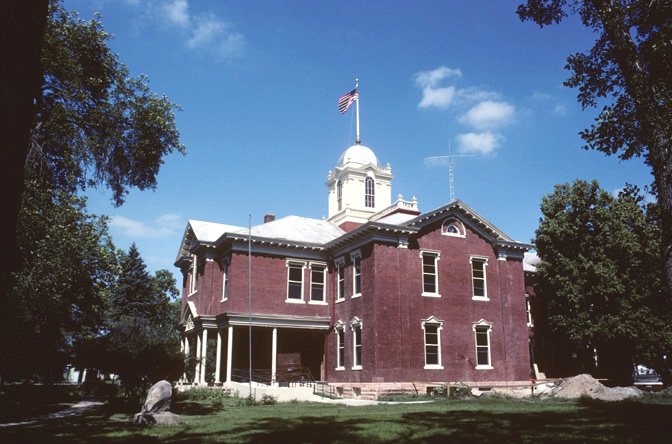

- Location within South Dakota Location within the United States
- Interactive map showing the location of Kingsbury County Courthouse
- Location: SD 25, De Smet, South Dakota
- Coordinates: 44°23′10″N 97°32′41″W
- Area: 1 acre (0.40 ha)
- Built: 1898
- Architectural style: Renaissance Revival
- NRHP reference No.: 77001249
- Added to NRHP: September 22, 1977

The Kingsbury County Courthouse, located on South Dakota Highway 25 in De Smet, South Dakota, was built in 1898. It was listed on the National Register of Historic Places in 1977.

It is a two-and one-half story Renaissance Revival-style building, topped by a cupola. It has a one-story flat-roofed porch on its front facade. Modillions under the cornice encircle the building.
