= Railroad Camp Shanty =

- U.S. National Register of Historic Places
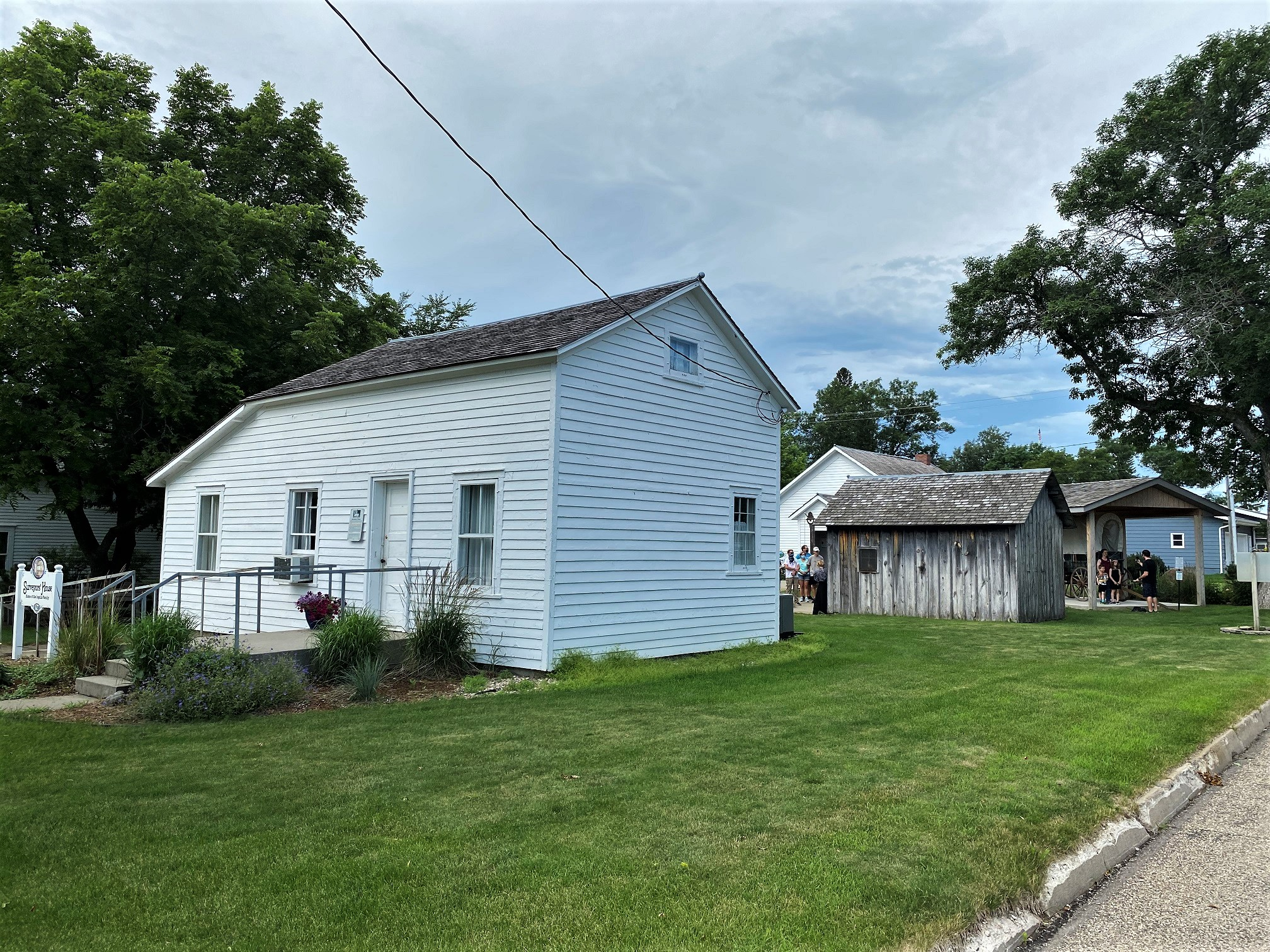
- The property in 2020

- Location within South Dakota Location within the United States
- Location: 1st and Olivet Sts. De Smet, South Dakota
- Coordinates: 44°23′12″N 97°32′39″W
- Built: 1878
- NRHP reference No.: 73001744
- Added to NRHP: March 20, 1973

The Railroad Camp Shanty in De Smet, South Dakota, United States, was built by the Chicago and Northwestern Railway (C&NW) in 1878 to shelter railroad personnel. The Railroad Shanty is a simple frame building measuring roughly 10' by 22' and covered with horizontal siding. Presumably in the 1880's or early 1890's the building was moved three blocks from its original location and was placed on a cement block foundation.

It was converted into a home by the Ingalls family during the winter of 1879-80. The family's experiences in the shanty were the subject of Wilder's By the Shores of Silver Lake, one of her most popular works. In 1967, the building was purchased by the Laura Ingalls Wilder Memorial Society, Inc., a local group, and now serves as a museum.

The railroad shanty was placed on the National Register of Historic Places because of its association with Laura Ingalls Wilder and railroad development in South Dakota.
