= Badger, South Dakota =

- Town
- Location in Kingsbury County and the state of South Dakota
- Coordinates: 44°29′08″N 97°12′28″W
- Country: United States
- State: South Dakota
- County: Kingsbury
- Platted: 1906

Area
  - Total: 1.06 sq mi (2.75 km^{2})
  - Land: 1.06 sq mi (2.75 km^{2})
  - Water: 0 sq mi (0.00 km^{2})
- Elevation: 1,723 ft (525 m)

Population (2020)
  - Total: 129
  - Density: 121.6/sq mi (46.96/km^{2})
- Time zone: UTC-6 (Central (CST))
  - Summer (DST): UTC-5 (CDT)
- ZIP code: 57214
- Area code: 605
- FIPS code: 46-03060
- GNIS feature ID: 1267275

Badger is a small town in Kingsbury County, South Dakota, United States. As of the 2020 census, Badger had a population of 129.

== History ==
Badger was laid out in 1906, taking its name from Lake Badger. A post office has been in operation at Badger since 1908.

== Geography ==
According to the United States Census Bureau, the town has a total area of 1.06 square miles (2.75 km^{2}), all land.

== Demographics ==
Historical population
Census	Pop.	Note	%±
1920	162		—
1930	163		0.6%
1940	170		4.3%
1950	180		5.9%
1960	117		−35.0%
1970	122		4.3%
1980	99		−18.9%
1990	114		15.2%
2000	144		26.3%
2010	107		−25.7%
2020	129		20.6%
U.S. Decennial Census

=== 2010 census ===
As of the census of 2010, there were 107 people, 48 households, and 27 families residing in the town. The population density was 100.9 inhabitants per square mile (39.0/km^{2}). There were 57 housing units at an average density of 53.8 per square mile (20.8/km^{2}). The racial makeup of the town was 100.0% White.

There were 48 households, of which 22.9% had children under the age of 18 living with them, 50.0% were married couples living together, 4.2% had a female householder with no husband present, 2.1% had a male householder with no wife present, and 43.8% were non-families. 37.5% of all households were made up of individuals, and 16.7% had someone living alone who was 65 years of age or older. The average household size was 2.23 and the average family size was 2.96.

The median age in the town was 48.8 years. 20.6% of residents were under the age of 18; 8.3% were between the ages of 18 and 24; 16.8% were from 25 to 44; 26.1% were from 45 to 64; and 28% were 65 years of age or older. The gender makeup of the town was 50.5% male and 49.5% female.

=== 2000 census ===
As of the census of 2000, there were 144 people, 62 households, and 45 families residing in the town. The population density was 135.3 inhabitants per square mile (52.2/km^{2}). There were 66 housing units at an average density of 62.0 per square mile (23.9/km^{2}). The racial makeup of the town was 99.31% White and 0.69% Asian.

There were 62 households, out of which 24.2% had children under the age of 18 living with them, 58.1% were married couples living together, 11.3% had a female householder with no husband present, and 27.4% were non-families. 27.4% of all households were made up of individuals, and 16.1% had someone living alone who was 65 years of age or older. The average household size was 2.32 and the average family size was 2.82.

In the town, the population was spread out, with 26.4% under the age of 18, 2.8% from 18 to 24, 17.4% from 25 to 44, 24.3% from 45 to 64, and 29.2% who were 65 years of age or older. The median age was 49 years. For every 100 females, there were 84.6 males. For every 100 females age 18 and over, there were 92.7 males.

The median income for a household in the town was $30,278, and the median income for a family was $32,361. Males had a median income of $25,500 versus $30,000 for females. The per capita income for the town was $16,508. There were none of the families and 3.0% of the population living below the poverty line, including no under eighteens and 11.1% of those over 64.
