= Oldham, South Dakota =

- City
- Location in Kingsbury County and the state of South Dakota
- Coordinates: 44°13′42″N 97°18′34″W
- Country: United States
- State: South Dakota
- County: Kingsbury
- Incorporated: 1917

Area
  - Total: 0.25 sq mi (0.64 km^{2})
  - Land: 0.25 sq mi (0.64 km^{2})
  - Water: 0 sq mi (0.00 km^{2})
- Elevation: 1,719 ft (524 m)

Population (2020)
  - Total: 121
  - Density: 492.2/sq mi (190.03/km^{2})
- Time zone: UTC-6 (CST)
  - Summer (DST): UTC-5 (CDT)
- ZIP code: 57051
- Area code: 605
- FIPS code: 46-46780
- GNIS feature ID: 1267521
- Website: oldhamsd.com

Oldham is a city in Kingsbury County, South Dakota, United States. As of the 2020 census, Oldham had a population of 121. The post office in Oldham opened in 1887.

Some say the city was named for Oldham Carrot, a local landowner, while others believe the name is a transfer from Oldham, England, the native home of a first settler.

== Geography ==
According to the United States Census Bureau, the city has a total area of 0.25 square miles (0.65 km^{2}), all land.

The Loriks Peterson Heritage House is on the National Register of Historic Places.

== Demographics ==
Historical population
Census	Pop.	Note	%±
1900	222		—
1910	355		59.9%
1920	364		2.5%
1930	419		15.1%
1940	386		−7.9%
1950	349		−9.6%
1960	291		−16.6%
1970	244		−16.2%
1980	222		−9.0%
1990	189		−14.9%
2000	206		9.0%
2010	133		−35.4%
2020	121		−9.0%
U.S. Decennial Census

=== 2020 census ===
As of the 2020 census, Oldham had a population of 121 and a median age of 43.1 years. Among residents, 23.1% were under the age of 18, 20.7% were 65 years of age or older, and for every 100 females there were 116.1 males while for every 100 females age 18 and over there were 116.3 males.

Of Oldham residents, 0.0% lived in urban areas and 100.0% lived in rural areas.

There were 63 households in Oldham, 15.9% of which had children under the age of 18 living with them; 22.2% were married-couple households, 36.5% were households with a male householder and no spouse or partner present, and 36.5% were households with a female householder and no spouse or partner present, while 58.7% of all households were made up of individuals and 20.6% had someone living alone who was 65 years of age or older.

There were 92 housing units, of which 31.5% were vacant; the homeowner and rental vacancy rates were both 0.0%.

Racial composition as of the 2020 census
Race	Number	Percent
White	105	86.8%
Black or African American	0	0.0%
American Indian and Alaska Native	1	0.8%
Asian	0	0.0%
Native Hawaiian and Other Pacific Islander	1	0.8%
Some other race	2	1.7%
Two or more races	12	9.9%
Hispanic or Latino (of any race)	7	5.8%

=== 2010 census ===
As of the census of 2010, there were 133 people, 65 households, and 33 families residing in the city. The population density was 532.0 inhabitants per square mile (205.4/km^{2}). There were 98 housing units at an average density of 392.0 units per square mile (151.4 units/km^{2}). The racial makeup of the city was 100.0% White. Hispanic or Latino of any race were 2.3% of the population.

There were 65 households, of which 20.0% had children under the age of 18 living with them, 41.5% were married couples living together, 6.2% had a female householder with no husband present, 3.1% had a male householder with no wife present, and 49.2% were non-families. 47.7% of all households were made up of individuals, and 27.7% had someone living alone who was 65 years of age or older. The average household size was 2.05 and the average family size was 2.97.

The median age in the city was 46.8 years. 22.6% of residents were under the age of 18; 9.8% were between the ages of 18 and 24; 14.4% were from 25 to 44; 30.2% were from 45 to 64; and 23.3% were 65 years of age or older. The gender makeup of the city was 48.9% male and 51.1% female.

=== 2000 census ===
As of the census of 2000, there were 206 people, 91 households, and 51 families residing in the city. The population density was 948.3 inhabitants per square mile (366.1/km^{2}). There were 106 housing units at an average density of 487.9 units per square mile (188.4 units/km^{2}). The racial makeup of the city was 100.00% White.

There were 91 households, out of which 25.3% had children under the age of 18 living with them, 46.2% were married couples living together, 6.6% had a female householder with no husband present, and 42.9% were non-families. 41.8% of all households were made up of individuals, and 25.3% had someone living alone who was 65 years of age or older. The average household size was 2.26 and the average family size was 3.04.

In the city, the population was spread out, with 28.2% under the age of 18, 6.3% from 18 to 24, 18.4% from 25 to 44, 19.9% from 45 to 64, and 27.2% who were 65 years of age or older. The median age was 44 years. For every 100 females, there were 77.6 males. For every 100 females age 18 and over, there were 78.3 males.

The median income for a household in the city was $21,458, and the median income for a family was $30,000. Males had a median income of $34,688 versus $20,208 for females. The per capita income for the city was $11,694. About 12.5% of families and 20.3% of the population were below the poverty line, including 40.7% of those under the age of eighteen and 6.6% of those 65 or over.

== Education ==
It is in the Oldham-Ramona-Rutland School District 39-6.

The Oldham and Ramona school districts combined in 1990, becoming the Oldham-Ramona School District 39-5. That district consolidated into ORR in 2023.
