= Bancroft, South Dakota =

- Town
- Location in Kingsbury County and the state of South Dakota
- Coordinates: 44°29′22″N 97°45′00″W
- Country: United States
- State: South Dakota
- County: Kingsbury

Area
  - Total: 0.23 sq mi (0.60 km^{2})
  - Land: 0.23 sq mi (0.60 km^{2})
  - Water: 0 sq mi (0.00 km^{2})
- Elevation: 1,572 ft (479 m)

Population (2020)
  - Total: 13
  - Density: 55.9/sq mi (21.59/km^{2})
- Time zone: UTC-6 (Central (CST))
  - Summer (DST): UTC-5 (CDT)
- ZIP code: 57353
- Area code: 605
- FIPS code: 46-03420
- GNIS feature ID: 1267278

Bancroft is a town in northwest Kingsbury County, South Dakota, United States. The population was 13 at the 2020 census, down from 19 at the 2010 census.

== History ==
Bancroft had its start in the late 1880s when the railroad was extended to that point. The town most likely was named after L. L. Bancroft, a local newspaper publisher. A post office was established at Bancroft in 1889.

== Geography ==
Bancroft is located on the west bank of Redstone Creek and approximately seven miles north of U.S. Route 14.

According to the United States Census Bureau, the town has a total area of 0.23 square miles (0.60 km^{2}), all of it land.

== Demographics ==
Historical population
Census	Pop.	Note	%±
1910	136		—
1920	141		3.7%
1930	155		9.9%
1940	126		−18.7%
1950	100		−20.6%
1960	86		−14.0%
1970	48		−44.2%
1980	41		−14.6%
1990	30		−26.8%
2000	37		23.3%
2010	19		−48.6%
2020	13		−31.6%
U.S. Decennial Census

=== 2010 census ===
As of the census of 2010, there were 19 people, 10 households, and 6 families residing in the town. The population density was 82.6 inhabitants per square mile (31.9/km^{2}). There were 13 housing units at an average density of 56.5 per square mile (21.8/km^{2}). The racial makeup of the town was 94.7% White and 5.3% from two or more races.

There were 10 households, of which 10.0% had children under the age of 18 living with them, 60.0% were married couples living together, and 40.0% were non-families. 40.0% of all households were made up of individuals, and 30% had someone living alone who was 65 years of age or older. The average household size was 1.90 and the average family size was 2.50.

The median age in the town was 54.3 years. 15.8% of residents were under the age of 18; 0% were between the ages of 18 and 24; 26.3% were from 25 to 44; 26.4% were from 45 to 64; and 31.6% were 65 years of age or older. The gender makeup of the town was 42.1% male and 57.9% female.

=== 2000 census ===
As of the census of 2000, there were 37 people, 13 households, and 10 families residing in the town. The population density was 157.9 inhabitants per square mile (61.0/km^{2}). There were 15 housing units at an average density of 64.0 per square mile (24.7/km^{2}). The racial makeup of the town was 97.00% White.

There were 13 households, out of which 46.2% had children under the age of 18 living with them, 76.9% were married couples living together, and 15.4% were non-families. 15.4% of all households were made up of individuals, and 15.4% had someone living alone who was 65 years of age or older. The average household size was 2.85 and the average family size was 3.18.

In the town, the population was spread out, with 27.0% under the age of 18, 5.4% from 18 to 24, 27.0% from 25 to 44, 18.9% from 45 to 64, and 21.6% who were 65 years of age or older. The median age was 38 years. For every 100 females, there were 131.3 males. For every 100 females age 18 and over, there were 107.7 males.

The median income for a household in the town was $43,500, and the median income for a family was $44,000. Males had a median income of $23,333 versus $16,250 for females. The per capita income for the town was $14,753. None of the population or families were below the poverty line.
