= Esmond, South Dakota =

Unincorporated community in South Dakota, U.S.

Coordinates: 44°15′44″N 97°46′17″W

Esmond is an unincorporated community in Kingsbury County, in the U.S. state of South Dakota.

== History ==
Esmond was originally called Sana, and under the latter name was platted in 1883. It was renamed Esmond in 1884, some say, after the novel The History of Henry Esmond by William Makepeace Thackeray. Others believe the community was named after Esmond, Illinois, the native home of a first settler. A post office was established as Sana in 1883, renamed Esmond in 1884, and the post office closed in 1973.
