= Kingsbury County, South Dakota =

County in South Dakota, United States

- County
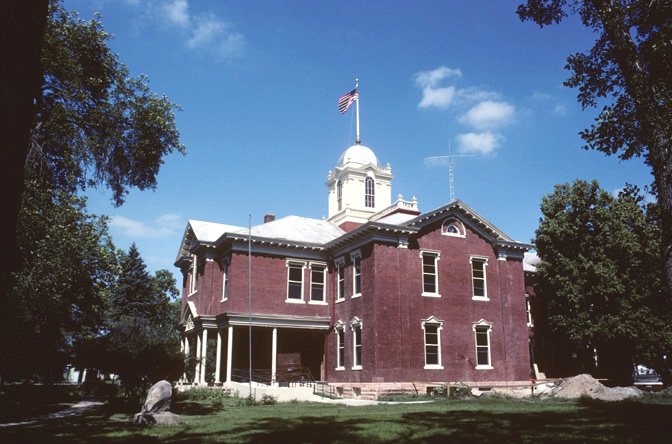
- Kingsbury County Courthouse in De Smet

- Location within the U.S. state of South Dakota
- Coordinates: 44°22′N 97°29′W
- Country: United States
- State: South Dakota
- Created: 1873
- Organized: 1880
- Named for: George W. Kingsbury & T.A. Kingsbury
- Seat: De Smet
- Largest city: De Smet

Area
  - Total: 864 sq mi (2,240 km^{2})
  - Land: 832 sq mi (2,150 km^{2})
  - Water: 32 sq mi (83 km^{2}) 3.6%

Population (2020)
  - Total: 5,187
  - Estimate (2025): 5,284 ▲
  - Density: 6.4/sq mi (2.5/km^{2})
- Time zone: UTC−6 (Central)
  - Summer (DST): UTC−5 (CDT)
- Congressional district: At-large
- Website: kingsbury.sdcounty.gov

Kingsbury County is a county in the U.S. state of South Dakota. As of the 2020 census, the population was 5,187. Its county seat is De Smet. The county was created in 1873, and was organized in 1880. It was named for brothers George W. and T. A. Kingsbury, descendants of the colonial English Kingsbury family in Boston, Massachusetts. They were prominently involved in the affairs of Dakota Territory and served as elected members of several Territorial Legislatures.

== History ==
John C. Fremont surveyed the area in 1838, naming lakes Preston and Albert. The 1851 Treaty of Mendota with the Santee Sioux and the 1858 Yankton Treaty ceded the region for American settlement. American presence was minimal until the Dakota Boom, with the notable exception of Jacob Hanson's settlement at Lake Albert in 1873.

Settlement surged in 1879 with the Chicago & North Western Railroad’s extension to De Smet. Kingsbury County was created in 1873, named for territorial legislators George W. and T. A. Kingsbury and was organized on December 13, 1879 with De Smet as the county seat. Settlements at Lake Preston, Arlington, and Iroquois grew rapidly, driven by the railroad and fertile prairie lands. By 1880, the county’s population reached 1,234.

Agriculture, particularly corn and wheat, anchored early economic growth, with towns like Lake Preston boasting mills and newspapers by 1881. De Smet gained fame as the setting for Laura Ingalls Wilder’s Little House series, including The Long Winter and Little Town on the Prairie, chronicling her family’s life there from 1879.

== Geography ==
The terrain of Kingsbury County consists of low rolling hills. The central and east portions of the county hold numerous lakes and ponds. The land is largely devoted to agriculture. The terrain generally slopes to the southwest, and the highest point is near the midpoint of the east boundary line, at 1,857 ft (566 m) ASL. The county has a total area of 864 square miles (2,240 km^{2}), of which 832 square miles (2,150 km^{2}) is land and 3.6 square miles (9.3 km^{2}) (6.2%) is water.

=== Lakes ===
- Cherry Lake
- Mud Lake
- Lake Albert
- Lake Badger
- Lake Henry
- Lake Iroquois
- Lake Preston
- Lake Thisted
- Lake Thompson
- Lake Whitewood
- Osceola Lake
- Plum Lake
- Spring Lake
- Spirit Lake
- Twin Lakes (partial)

=== Major highways ===
- U.S. Highway 14
- U.S. Highway 81
- South Dakota Highway 25

=== Adjacent counties ===
- Hamlin County – northeast
- Brookings County – east
- Lake County – southeast
- Miner County – south
- Sanborn County – southwest
- Beadle County – west
- Clark County – northwest

=== Protected areas ===
- Arnold State Public Shooting Area

== Demographics ==
Industrialization of agriculture and the attraction of urban areas have contributed to the decline in population of Kingsbury County, similar to what has occurred in other Plains rural areas. In 2010 it had less than half the population of its peak in 1930, before the Dust Bowl and the Great Depression.

Historical population
Census	Pop.	Note	%±
1880	1,102		—
1890	8,562		677.0%
1900	9,866		15.2%
1910	12,560		27.3%
1920	12,802		1.9%
1930	12,805		0.0%
1940	10,831		−15.4%
1950	9,962		−8.0%
1960	9,227		−7.4%
1970	7,657		−17.0%
1980	6,679		−12.8%
1990	5,925		−11.3%
2000	5,815		−1.9%
2010	5,148		−11.5%
2020	5,187		0.8%
2025 (est.)	5,284	▲	1.9%
U.S. Decennial Census

=== 2020 census ===
As of the 2020 census, there were 5,187 people, 2,191 households, and 1,398 families residing in the county; the population density was 6.2 inhabitants per square mile (2.4/km^{2}). There were 2,615 housing units.

Of the residents, 22.9% were under the age of 18 and 24.3% were 65 years of age or older; the median age was 44.8 years. For every 100 females there were 104.6 males, and for every 100 females age 18 and over there were 104.6 males.

The racial makeup of the county was 95.7% White, 0.2% Black or African American, 0.5% American Indian and Alaska Native, 0.2% Asian, 0.7% from some other race, and 2.6% from two or more races. Hispanic or Latino residents of any race comprised 2.3% of the population.

There were 2,191 households, of which 24.1% had children under the age of 18 living with them and 19.6% had a female householder with no spouse or partner present. About 31.9% of all households were made up of individuals and 14.7% had someone living alone who was 65 years of age or older.

Among the 2,615 housing units, 16.2% were vacant. Among occupied housing units, 77.4% were owner-occupied and 22.6% were renter-occupied. The homeowner vacancy rate was 1.2% and the rental vacancy rate was 7.5%.

=== 2010 census ===
As of the 2010 census, there were 5,148 people, 2,222 households, and 1,418 families in the county. The population density was 6.2 inhabitants per square mile (2.4/km^{2}). There were 2,720 housing units at an average density of 3.3 units per square mile (1.3 units/km^{2}). The racial makeup of the county was 98.1% white, 0.5% American Indian, 0.3% Asian, 0.1% black or African American, 0.3% from other races, and 0.8% from two or more races. Those of Hispanic or Latino origin made up 1.4% of the population. In terms of European ancestry, 42.8% were German, 25.5% were Norwegian, 10.9% were Danish, 9.6% were Irish, 7.2% were English, and 3.5% were American.

Of the 2,222 households, 24.3% had children under the age of 18 living with them, 55.6% were married couples living together, 5.0% had a female householder with no husband present, 36.2% were non-families, and 32.2% of all households were made up of individuals. The average household size was 2.23 and the average family size was 2.81. The median age was 47.1 years.

The median income for a household in the county was $44,948 and the median income for a family was $56,925. Males had a median income of $35,585 versus $28,141 for females. The per capita income for the county was $24,660. About 7.0% of families and 9.2% of the population were below the poverty line, including 8.8% of those under age 18 and 10.8% of those age 65 or over.

== Communities ==
=== Cities ===
- De Smet (county seat)
- Arlington (partial)
- Iroquois (partial)
- Lake Preston
- Oldham

=== Towns ===
- Badger
- Bancroft
- Erwin
- Hetland

=== Census-designated place ===
- Spring Lake Colony

=== Unincorporated communities ===
- Esmond
- Osceola

=== Ghost town ===
- Manchester

=== Townships ===
- Badger
- Baker
- De Smet
- Denver
- Esmond
- Hartland
- Iroquois
- Le Sueur
- Manchester
- Mathews
- Spirit Lake
- Spring Lake
- Whitewood

== Education ==
School districts include:

- Arlington School District 38-1
- De Smet School District 38-2
- Hamlin School District 28-3
- Howard School District 48-3
- Iroquois School District 02-3
- Lake Preston School District 38-3
- Oldham-Ramona-Rutland School District 39-6
- Willow Lake School District 12-3

The Oldham-Ramona School District 39-5, in the county, consolidated into ORR in 2023.

== Notable people ==
- Harvey Dunn - painter and professor of Fine Arts
- Eugene Peter Knudsen - Minnesota state legislator and farmer
- Theodore Schultz - Nobel prize winning economist
- Laura Ingalls Wilder - author

== Politics ==
Kingsbury County voters have been reliably Republican for decades. In only two national elections since 1932 has the county selected the Democratic Party candidate (as of 2024).

United States presidential election results for Kingsbury County, South Dakota
Year	Republican		Democratic		Third party(ies)	
Year	No.	%	No.	%	No.	%
1892	951	46.28%	175	8.52%	929	45.21%
1896	950	46.82%	1,051	51.80%	28	1.38%
1900	1,330	58.10%	868	37.92%	91	3.98%
1904	1,896	77.67%	344	14.09%	201	8.23%
1908	1,537	60.70%	799	31.56%	196	7.74%
1912	0	0.00%	747	34.52%	1,417	65.48%
1916	1,339	51.80%	1,096	42.40%	150	5.80%
1920	2,344	71.66%	481	14.70%	446	13.63%
1924	2,242	65.65%	333	9.75%	840	24.60%
1928	3,499	71.88%	1,352	27.77%	17	0.35%
1932	2,135	42.42%	2,808	55.79%	90	1.79%
1936	2,813	55.42%	2,037	40.13%	226	4.45%
1940	3,551	70.26%	1,503	29.74%	0	0.00%
1944	2,541	68.73%	1,156	31.27%	0	0.00%
1948	2,332	62.55%	1,338	35.89%	58	1.56%
1952	3,703	78.25%	1,029	21.75%	0	0.00%
1956	2,933	64.92%	1,585	35.08%	0	0.00%
1960	2,887	63.26%	1,677	36.74%	0	0.00%
1964	2,126	51.46%	2,005	48.54%	0	0.00%
1968	2,300	58.42%	1,491	37.87%	146	3.71%
1972	2,320	58.62%	1,632	41.23%	6	0.15%
1976	1,844	50.98%	1,762	48.71%	11	0.30%
1980	2,376	62.41%	1,132	29.73%	299	7.85%
1984	2,121	62.70%	1,249	36.92%	13	0.38%
1988	1,592	51.57%	1,472	47.68%	23	0.75%
1992	1,113	35.41%	1,267	40.31%	763	24.28%
1996	1,297	43.22%	1,357	45.22%	347	11.56%
2000	1,612	59.11%	1,049	38.47%	66	2.42%
2004	1,804	59.85%	1,163	38.59%	47	1.56%
2008	1,435	51.54%	1,277	45.87%	72	2.59%
2012	1,451	55.64%	1,092	41.87%	65	2.49%
2016	1,680	65.86%	703	27.56%	168	6.59%
2020	1,904	68.51%	819	29.47%	56	2.02%
2024	1,989	71.01%	760	27.13%	52	1.86%

== See also ==
- National Register of Historic Places listings in Kingsbury County, South Dakota
