= List of tornadoes in the outbreak sequence of May 3–11, 2003 =

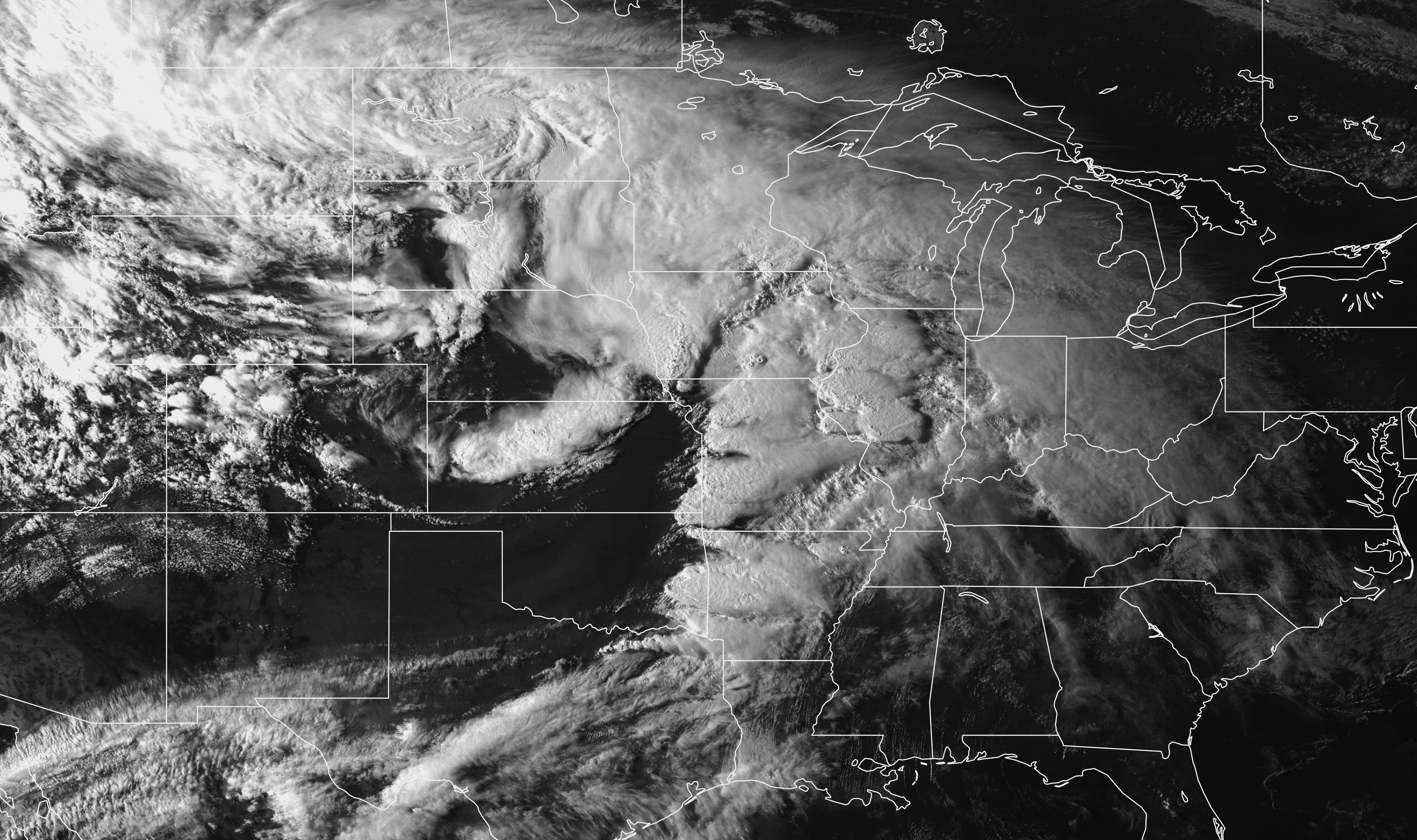
Visible satellite imagery of the storm system on May 4, 2003

In early May 2003, a series of large and destructive tornado outbreaks affected much of the Central and Eastern United States. Environmental conditions were unusually conducive to a prolonged period of severe weather, driven by a persistent upper-level trough across the Intermountain West. This feature in the upper atmosphere provided significant wind shear during each day of the outbreak series. Meanwhile, moist air from the Gulf of Mexico surged northward across the country, providing the moisture and instability needed to fuel tornadic activity. This combination of factors persisted every day from May 3 to May 11.

The most significant day of the severe weather event was May 4, when a votaile atmospheric setup produced numerous strong to violent tornadoes across Arkansas, Kansas, Missouri, Oklahoma, and adjacent areas. A total of 79 tornadoes were documented that day, the second most on record at the time, behind only the 1974 Super Outbreak.

A total of 42 people were killed, and an additional 652 people were injured. In all, 363 tornadoes were confirmed over an eight-day period. Further analysis of the event suggested an extended outbreak of that magnitude occurs roughly every 10–100 years. May 2003 would remain the month with the most tornado activity on record, until it was surpassed by April 2011.

== Confirmed tornadoes ==
Daily statistics
Date	Total	F0	F1	F2	F3	F4	F5	Deaths	Injuries
May 3	13	10	2	1	0	0	0	0	0
May 4	79	31	23	13	8	4	0	38	343
May 5	28	16	11	0	1	0	0	0	5
May 6	75	41	26	6	1	1	0	2	60
May 7	30	16	13	1	0	0	0	0	6
May 8	45	25	11	5	3	1	0	0	146
May 9	29	16	11	1	1	0	0	1	11
May 10	49	24	15	7	3	0	0	0	65
May 11	15	1	9	2	3	0	0	1	16
Total	363	180	121	36	20	6	0	42	652

Confirmed tornadoes during the May 2003 tornado outbreak sequence (Note: All dates are based on the local time zone where the tornado touched down; however, all times are in Coordinated Universal Time for consistency.)
F#	Location	County / Parish	State	Coord.	Date	Time (UTC)	Path length	Max width	Summary
F0	N of Minatare	Scotts Bluff	NE	41.85°N 103.50°W	May 3	21:41–22:01	0.3 mi (0.48 km)	90 yd (82 m)	A cow shed was destroyed.
F0	N of Bayard	Morrill	NE	41.83°N 103.32°W	May 3	22:00–22:05	0.1 mi (0.16 km)	40 yd (37 m)	A trained storm spotter reported a tornado over open country.
F0	NE of Aspermont	Stonewall	TX	33.22°N 100.15°W	May 3	22:57–23:00	0.5 mi (0.80 km)	40 yd (37 m)	A storm chaser reported a tornado.
F1	NE of Angora	Morrill	NE	41.85°N 103.02°W	May 3	23:00–23:35	4 mi (6.4 km)	100 yd (91 m)	A mobile home was destroyed. A wind mill and an irrigation center pivot were damaged. Power lines were blown down.
F1	N of McGrew	Scotts Bluff	NE	41.78°N 103.42°W	May 3	23:34	8 mi (13 km)	100 yd (91 m)	Numerous outbuildings were damaged or destroyed while power lines were downed.
F0	W of Bayard	Morrill	NE	41.75°N 103.33°W	May 3	23:35–23:41	0.1 mi (0.16 km)	50 yd (46 m)	A trained storm spotter reported a tornado over open country.
F0	N of Old Glory	Stonewall	TX	33.22°N 100.05°W	May 3	23:37–23:38	0.1 mi (0.16 km)	40 yd (37 m)	A storm chaser reported a tornado over open country.
F0	S of Rule	Haskell	TX	33.15°N 99.9°W	May 3	00:11–00:12	0.5 mi (0.80 km)	10 yd (9.1 m)	Flying debris damaged a car.
F0	S of Haskell	Haskell	TX	33.05°N 99.75°W	May 3	00:20–00:23	1 mi (1.6 km)	200 yd (180 m)	A multiple-vortex tornado remained over an open field with little damage.
F0	NNE of Bison	Perkins	SD	45.72°N 102.35°W	May 3	00:35	0.5 mi (0.80 km)	10 yd (9.1 m)	Law enforcement reported a brief tornado. No damage occurred.
F0	SE of Alliance	Garden	NE	41.77°N 102.43°W	May 3	00:50–00:52	0.3 mi (0.48 km)	10 yd (9.1 m)	An off-duty National Weather Service (NWS) employee reported a tornado over open rangeland. No damage occurred.
F2	SE of Haskell	Haskell	TX	33.07°N 99.63°W	May 3	01:10–01:20	4 mi (6.4 km)	400 yd (370 m)	A strong tornado downed 11 transmission poles and eight distribution poles.
F0	SE of Haskell	Haskell	TX	33.02°N 99.57°W	May 3	01:12–01:15	1 mi (1.6 km)	30 yd (27 m)	A rope tornado was observed by storm chasers.
F0	NW of Dannebrog	Howard	NE	41.15°N 98.58°W	May 4	06:15–06:18	1 mi (1.6 km)	35 yd (32 m)	Irrigation pivots, outbuildings, and trees all sustained minor damage.
F0	NW of Scott City	Scott	KS	38.63°N 101.08°W	May 4	19:59	0.1 mi (0.16 km)	30 yd (27 m)	A brief landspout was observed by law enforcement.
F0	Colon area	Saunders	NE	41.3°N 96.62°W	May 4	20:28–20:30	1.0 mi (1.6 km)	150 yd (140 m)	A weak tornado caused minor roof, shed, and tree damage near Colon.
F1	W of Memphis	Saunders	NE	41.1°N 96.47°W	May 4	20:35–20:38	1.3 mi (2.1 km)	250 yd (230 m)	Cottonwood trees were downed near Memphis State Recreation Area. A grain bin was stripped from its foundation while a grain bin and center pivot irrigation system were blown over.
F1	Fort Leavenworth area	Leavenworth (KS), Platte (MO)	KS, MO	39.2°N 94.98°W	May 4	20:54–21:00	3.0 mi (4.8 km)	50 yd (46 m)	See section on this tornado – A brief tornado remained over open country and crossed the Missouri River after which two barns sustained major damage. Minor damage was wrought to sixteen homes in Missouri.
F2	NW of Linwood	Leavenworth	KS	39.02°N 95.07°W	May 4	20:55–21:12	6.0 mi (9.7 km)	250 yd (230 m)	See section on this tornado – A tornado caused two injuries and $2 million in damage, with the worst damage occurring to homes near the Kansas Turnpike.
F0	W of Parsons	Labette	KS	37.35°N 95.38°W	May 4	21:18	0.5 mi (0.80 km)	55 yd (50 m)	A brief tornado was reported by law enforcement.
F4	ENE of Bonner Springs, KS to NW of Gladstone, MO	Wyandotte (KS), Platte (MO), Clay (MO)	KS, MO	39.07°N 94.83°W	May 4	21:18–21:42	21.0 mi (33.8 km)	500 yd (460 m)	2 deaths – See section on this tornado – This tornado caused 30 injuries and $47.55 million in damage in the North Kansas City area.
F0	SW of Plattsmouth	Cass	NE	41°N 95.92°W	May 4	21:28–21:35	0.3 mi (0.48 km)	100 yd (91 m)	A brief tornado remained in an open field.
F0	NE of Parsons	Labette	KS	37.4°N 95.2°W	May 4	21:30	0.5 mi (0.80 km)	55 yd (50 m)	A brief tornado was reported by emergency management.
F0	SE of Mission	Todd	SD	43.25°N 100.6°W	May 4	21:30–21:45	1.0 mi (1.6 km)	10 yd (9.1 m)	A tornado touched down several times without causing damage.
F4	NW of McCune, KS to N of Liberal, MO	Neosho (KS), Crawford (KS), Barton (MO)	KS, MO	37.42°N 95.10°W	May 4	21:35–22:35	33 mi (53 km)	880 yd (800 m)	4 deaths – See section on this tornado – A long-lived, large, and violent tornado severely damaged or destroyed many homes, barns, and outbuildings. Many large trees and power poles were snapped or uprooted. Vehicles were tossed several hundred feet, and fields were scoured. Thirty people were injured.
F0	SE of St. Paul	Neosho	KS	37.43°N 95.17°W	May 4	21:37–22:42	4 mi (6.4 km)	110 yd (100 m)	Emergency management reported unspecified damage to two homes, trees, and power lines.
F4	Gladstone to Pleasant Valley	Clay	MO	39.23°N 94.48°W	May 4	21:45–21:55	5 mi (8.0 km)	200 yd (180 m)	See section on this tornado – A tornado began in Gladstone and rapidly intensified while moving northeast, producing F4 damage to two locales. It continued to cause significant damage until lifting a short distance from Interstate 435.
F2	Liberty	Clay	MO	39.25°N 94.43°W	May 4	21:59–22:15	8.5 mi (13.7 km)	300 yd (270 m)	See section on this tornado – An F2 tornado caused its most severe damage near the city square and to William Jewell College in Liberty. It continued into rural areas before dissipating.
F1	Drexel, MO area	Miami (KS), Cass (MO)	KS, MO	38.45°N 94.73°W	May 4	22:06–22:25	9 mi (14 km)	150 yd (140 m)	An F1 tornado remained over open country throughout Kansas and Missouri.
F0	NW of Vinita	Craig	OK	36.72°N 95.35°W	May 4	22:24–22:30	3 mi (4.8 km)	200 yd (180 m)	Trees were snapped or uprooted. No structural damage occurred.
F1	Bartlett, KS to SE of Chetopa, KS	Craig (OK), Labette (KS), Cherokee (KS)	OK, KS	36.98°N 95.30°W	May 4	22:25–22:35	12 mi (19 km)	220 yd (200 m)	In Bartlett, 24 farm dwellings and service buildings, in addition to 40 pieces of farm machinery and equipment, were heavily damaged or destroyed.
F3	N of Liberal to Stockton to SW of Urbana	Barton, Cedar, Polk, Hickory, Dallas	MO	37.57°N 94.52°W	May 4	22:31–00:42	86 mi (138 km)	880 yd (800 m)	5 deaths – See section on this tornado – A long-duration and intense tornado began in generally rural areas of Barton County. It progressed into Cedar County, directly hitting the city of Stockton, where 350 structures were destroyed and an additional 650 were heavily damaged. As a result, 3 people were killed and 37 more were injured. The tornado continued into Polk County, destroying 180 more structures and damaging an additional 70. In Hickory County, only tree damage occurred. The large tornado progressed into Dallas County, where it destroyed 48 more structures and killed 2 people while injuring 10 others. Forty-seven people were injured altogether.
F0	N of Chetopa	Labette	KS	37.07°N 95.08°W	May 4	22:40	0.5 mi (0.80 km)	55 yd (50 m)	A brief tornado occurred north of Chetopa.
F3	N of Melrose, KS to Carl Junction, MO	Cherokee (KS), Jasper (MO)	KS, MO	37.07°N 94.95°W	May 4	22:45–23:25	25 mi (40 km)	880 yd (800 m)	5 deaths – An intense tornado progressed across rural areas of Cherokee County, killing 3 people and injuring 19 more. It continued into Jasper County, destroying 112 structures and damaging 487 more. A total of 2 people were killed and 15 others were injured there.
F1	S of Narcissa	Ottawa	OK	36.77°N 94.93°W	May 4	22:55–23:05	5 mi (8.0 km)	880 yd (800 m)	Two mobile homes were destroyed and several other structures were damaged.
F2	NW of Garden City to SW of Warrensburg	Cass, Johnson	MO	38.58°N 94.22°W	May 4	23:04–23:53	22 mi (35 km)	100 yd (91 m)	Trained storm spotters documented a tornado that remained over mainly open country.
F0	NE of Sheldon	Vernon	MO	37.67°N 94.25°W	May 4	23:10	0.2 mi (0.32 km)	20 yd (18 m)	Law enforcement reported a brief tornado. No damage occurred.
F0	Joplin	Jasper	MO	37.20°N 94.32°W	May 4	23:30	0.2 mi (0.32 km)	20 yd (18 m)	A brief tornado downed trees near the Joplin Regional Airport.
F3	S of Ritchey to Pierce City to Battlefield	Newton, Lawrence, Christian, Greene	MO	36.90°N 94.20°W	May 4	23:50–01:03	49 mi (79 km)	880 yd (800 m)	7 deaths – See section on this tornado – A long-lived and intense tornado began in Newton County, destroying 3 homes and outbuildings while damaging five others. It continued into Lawrence County and moved through downtown Pierce City. There, around 229 homes, businesses, and outbuildings (including century-old structures) were completely destroyed while an additional 320 were damaged. In Christian County, 27 structures were destroyed and 150 more were damaged. The tornado continued into Greene County, destroying 100 homes and damaging 150 more in the city of Battlefield. Forty-eight people were injured.
F0	SW of Bee Branch	Van Buren	AR	35.42°N 92.45°W	May 4	23:52–23:53	3.1 mi (5.0 km)	25 yd (23 m)	A hay barn was destroyed, and a few trees were knocked down.
F0	E of Heavener, OK	Le Flore (OK), Scott (AR)	OK, AR	34.88°N 94.47°W	May 4	23:58–00:14	18.8 mi (30.3 km)	30 yd (27 m)	A long-tracked but weak tornado damaged trees along its path.
F1	Whiteman Air Force Base	Johnson	MO	38.72°N 93.75°W	May 4	23:58–00:19	10 mi (16 km)	75 yd (69 m)	A private business suffered F1 damage; otherwise, F0 impact was noted elsewhere.
F1	Leachville	Mississippi	AR	35.93°N 90.28°W	May 4	00:15–00:25	4 mi (6.4 km)	250 yd (230 m)	Several large tree limbs were blown down.
F2	SE of Guy to S of Heber Springs	Faulkner, Cleburne	AR	35.28°N 92.28°W	May 4	00:34–00:59	14.5 mi (23.3 km)	100 yd (91 m)	A strong tornado began in Faulkner County, blowing down several trees. It continued into Cleburne County, destroying several outbuildings and barns and an old chicken house. A mobile home was tossed into an old milking barn, and both structures were demolished. Several houses and mobile homes were also damaged. A travel trailer was overturned, injuring the occupant. Dozens of trees were downed.
F0	NE of La Monte	Pettis	MO	38.82°N 93.38°W	May 4	00:35–00:36	0.5 mi (0.80 km)	50 yd (46 m)	A trained storm spotter reported a brief tornado with unspecified, minor damage.
F3	S of Camdenton to Montreal	Camden	MO	37.90°N 92.83°W	May 4	00:36–01:08	14 mi (23 km)	400 yd (370 m)	4 deaths – An intense and large tornado destroyed about 50 homes and outbuildings along its path, injuring 27 people. Significant agricultural losses were accrued as well.
F2	Monette to Manila	Craighead, Mississippi	AR	35.87°N 90.33°W	May 4	00:39–00:59	15 mi (24 km)	300 yd (270 m)	A strong tornado began in Craighead County but caused little damage there. It continued into Mississippi County, destroying three homes and damaging several others. Six farm pivots were damaged, in addition to a car when a tree fell on it.
F1	SSE of Wooster	Faulkner	AR	35.17°N 92.47°W	May 4	00:50–00:51	1.8 mi (2.9 km)	75 yd (69 m)	Several small greenhouses, a covered garage, and one additional building were destroyed. The roof of a storage building and the porch of a home were ripped off. Several homes and businesses were damaged. Several trees were blown down.
F0	SW of Hornersville	Dunklin	MO	36.02°N 90.17°W	May 4	00:50–00:55	3 mi (4.8 km)	200 yd (180 m)	Two homes were damaged.
F0	N of Steele	Pemiscot	MO	36.10°N 89.83°W	May 4	00:50–00:58	6 mi (9.7 km)	440 yd (400 m)	The roofs of a few homes were damaged. Trees and power poles were knocked down.
F3	NE of Mayflower to SW of Searcy	Faulkner, Lonoke, White	AR	35.00°N 92.37°W	May 4	00:52–01:34	34.9 mi (56.2 km)	500 yd (460 m)	In Faulkner and Lonoke counties, several homes and other structures suffered some damage while a number of trees and power poles were downed. In White County, numerous homes and businesses were destroyed, and others sustained significant damage. Two tractor-trailers were overturned, a number of vehicles were damaged or destroyed, and numerous trees and power poles were toppled. Five people were injured.
F0	NE of Rogersville	Webster	MO	37.13°N 93.03°W	May 4	01:20	0.2 mi (0.32 km)	20 yd (18 m)	Law enforcement reported a tornado that caused no damage.
F0	S of Iberia	Miller	MO	38.07°N 92.32°W	May 4	01:30	0.2 mi (0.32 km)	20 yd (18 m)	Law enforcement reported a tornado that caused no damage.
F0	Arnica	Cedar	MO	37.75°N 93.72°W	May 4	01:35	0.2 mi (0.32 km)	20 yd (18 m)	Several trees were downed.
F0	E of Dyersburg	Dyer	TN	36.03°N 89.37°W	May 4	01:45	1 mi (1.6 km)	100 yd (91 m)	Many trees were downed.
F2	Morley to N of Charleston	Scott	MO	37.05°N 89.62°W	May 4	01:53–02:05	11.5 mi (18.5 km)	130 yd (120 m)	A mobile home was destroyed, several small buildings were damaged, numerous trees were damaged or downed, and several irrigation systems were moved or overturned.
F0	SE of Flemington	Polk	MO	37.77°N 93.47°W	May 4	01:55	0.2 mi (0.32 km)	20 yd (18 m)	Law enforcement observed a tornado with no significant damage.
F3	NE of Georgetown to S of Hickory Ridge	White, Woodruff, Cross	AR	35.12°N 91.45°W	May 4	01:55–02:19	43 mi (69 km)	300 yd (270 m)	Another long-tracked tornado began in White County, downing several large trees. It intensified in Woodruff County, inflicting severe damage to numerous homes and buildings. A widespread swath of trees and power poles were toppled. The tornado continued into Cross County, where five homes were destroyed and an additional seven were damaged. Four people were injured.
F0	S of Vienna	Maries	MO	38.13°N 91.95°W	May 4	02:05	0.2 mi (0.32 km)	20 yd (18 m)	Several trees were downed.
F1	N of Weldon	Jackson	AR	35.45°N 91.25°W	May 4	02:10–02:12	1.8 mi (2.9 km)	30 yd (27 m)	Nine power poles were snapped off, and large wooden structures which uphold power lines were downed. A farm shed had its metal roof blown off. Some trees were knocked down.
F0	W of Tunas	Dallas	MO	37.85°N 93.05°W	May 4	02:13	0.2 mi (0.32 km)	20 yd (18 m)	Law enforcement observed a brief tornado. No property damage occurred.
F1	Newbern	Dyer	TN	36.10°N 89.27°W	May 4	02:20	2 mi (3.2 km)	200 yd (180 m)	The roofs of several homes were ripped off. Numerous trees and power lines were toppled.
F1	Trenton	Gibson	TN	35.87°N 89.07°W	May 4	02:25–02:41	8 mi (13 km)	100 yd (91 m)	One home was destroyed and several others were damaged.
F0	S of Camdenton	Camden	MO	37.95°N 92.75°W	May 4	02:30	0.2 mi (0.32 km)	20 yd (18 m)	Law enforcement observed a brief tornado. No property damage occurred.
F1	Finley	Dyer	TN	36.02°N 89.52°W	May 4	02:30–02:38	4 mi (6.4 km)	150 yd (140 m)	Several houses were damaged or destroyed.
F2	Martin	Weakley	TN	36.35°N 88.85°W	May 4	02:35–02:45	4 mi (6.4 km)	150 yd (140 m)	A business was destroyed, two storage buildings at a high school were blown away, and the gymnasium roofs at an elementary and a middle school were at least partially ripped off. Many trees and power lines were toppled.
F1	W of Joppa, IL	Ballard (KY), Massac (IL)	KY, IL	37.18°N 88.95°W	May 4	02:43–02:50	3.9 mi (6.3 km)	100 yd (91 m)	A half dozen trees were downed in Ballard County, Kentucky. Across the Ohio River in Massac County, Illinois, an anchorage barge was moved from its moorings, a work trailer was flipped, and numerous trees and power lines were downed. Other trailers were damaged. Three concrete slabs, each weighing about 500 lb (230 kg), were moved from their positions on top of silos.
F0	SW of Crocker	Pulaski	MO	37.92°N 92.33°W	May 4	02:55	0.2 mi (0.32 km)	20 yd (18 m)	Several trees were downed.
F1	Keiser	Mississippi	AR	35.63°N 90.15°W	May 4	03:00–03:12	8 mi (13 km)	200 yd (180 m)	Several homes were damaged and some trees were toppled.
F1	N of Burna, KY	Pope (IL), Livingston (KY)	IL, KY	37.28°N 88.53°W	May 4	03:09–03:26	10.8 mi (17.4 km)	60 yd (55 m)	A tornado touched down in Illinois, causing extensive tree damage. It crossed the Ohio River into Kentucky, destroying grain bins, damaging the roofs of a few homes, and continuing to down trees.
F1	Bay City, IL	Pope (IL), Livingston (KY)	IL, KY	37.23°N 88.47°W	May 4	03:10–03:12	1.2 mi (1.9 km)	40 yd (37 m)	A tornado touched down in Illinois, blowing down large trees and damaging barns and fences. It crossed the Ohio River into Kentucky, continuing to down trees.
F0	NW of Indian Mound	Stewart	TN	36.51°N 87.69°W	May 4	03:28	0.1 mi (0.16 km)	10 yd (9.1 m)	A brick home was damaged. This tornado was not officially recorded prior to a 2016 reanalysis by the National Weather Service Weather Forecast Office in Nashville, Tennessee.
F0	S of Rolla	Phelps	MO	37.88°N 91.77°W	May 4	03:30	0.2 mi (0.32 km)	30 yd (27 m)	Several trees were downed.
F2	NE of Murray	Calloway	KY	36.67°N 88.23°W	May 4	03:30–03:37	1.8 mi (2.9 km)	60 yd (55 m)	Two barns were destroyed and several others were damaged, six homes suffered minor or moderate damage, and numerous trees were downed.
F1	W of Marion	Crittenden	KY	37.35°N 88.28°W	May 4	03:30–03:38	5.5 mi (8.9 km)	30 yd (27 m)	Numerous trees were downed.
F1	W of Marion	Crittenden	KY	37.32°N 88.23°W	May 4	03:32	2 mi (3.2 km)	40 yd (37 m)	Trees were downed.
F0	Yorkville	Dyer, Gibson	TN	36.07°N 89.18°W	May 4	03:40–04:04	12 mi (19 km)	75 yd (69 m)	Trees were downed.
F2	NE of Marion	Crittenden	KY	37.40°N 88.02°W	May 4	03:45	0.2 mi (0.32 km)	25 yd (23 m)	A mobile home was destroyed, injuring the occupant, and a permanent house was significantly damaged as well. A barn was destroyed. Numerous trees and power lines were downed.
F1	Medina	Gibson	TN	35.80°N 88.77°W	May 4	03:50–04:00	5 mi (8.0 km)	100 yd (91 m)	Two homes were destroyed and several others were damaged.
F1	WSW of Clay	Webster	KY	37.47°N 87.90°W	May 4	03:53	0.2 mi (0.32 km)	20 yd (18 m)	An old barn was destroyed, a house suffered minor damage, and numerous small trees were toppled.
F2	Southern Paris	Henry	TN	36.22°N 88.42°W	May 4	03:53–04:27	17 mi (27 km)	200 yd (180 m)	A strong tornado impacted southern Paris, destroying 5 homes and damaging 150 others. A total of 3 commercial buildings were destroyed while 19 others, including a school, sustained damage.
F1	W of Clay	Webster	KY	37.48°N 87.87°W	May 4	03:56	0.2 mi (0.32 km)	25 yd (23 m)	Three large chicken houses were destroyed at a chicken farm. A majority of the about 100,000 chickens survived.
F2	Clay	Webster	KY	37.48°N 87.85°W	May 4	03:58–04:00	1.5 mi (2.4 km)	75 yd (69 m)	A strong tornado moved through Clay, destroying 6 homes and 2 businesses. An additional 45 homes and 4 businesses were damaged to varying degrees. Numerous trees and power lines were downed. A woman was injured when a tree fell on her.
F0	N of Salem	Dent	MO	37.70°N 91.55°W	May 4	04:00	0.2 mi (0.32 km)	20 yd (18 m)	Several trees were downed.
F2	Dyersburg to Newbern	Dyer	TN	36.00°N 89.42°W	May 4	04:00–04:30	15 mi (24 km)	200 yd (180 m)	A strong tornado moved through Dyersburg, destroying over 70 homes and damaging over 300 more. A total of 8 commercial buildings were destroyed while another 20 were damaged.
F1	NE of Buchanan, TN	Henry (TN), Calloway (KY)	TN, KY	36.43°N 88.13°W	May 4	04:10–04:22	6 mi (9.7 km)	100 yd (91 m)	More than 50 homes were damaged.
F1	Gleason	Weakley	TN	36.22°N 88.62°W	May 4	04:20–04:30	3 mi (4.8 km)	100 yd (91 m)	A church steeple was ripped off its roof, the top of a water tower was blown down, and many trees and power lines were toppled.
F0	SSE of Pine View	Perry	TN	35.69°N 87.95°W	May 4	04:31	1.57 mi (2.53 km)	200 yd (180 m)	Dozens of trees were snapped or uprooted. This tornado was not officially recorded prior to a 2016 reanalysis.
F3	N of Cunningham to Springfield	Montgomery, Robertson	TN	36.41°N 87.40°W	May 4	04:34	31.5 mi (50.7 km)	1,000 yd (910 m)	An intense and long-tracked tornado damaged 108 homes, including 25-30 houses throughout the communities of Stroudsville, Sandy Springs and Springfield. Large trees were uprooted. One person was injured. This tornado was originally listed as two tornadoes prior to a 2015 reanalysis.
F4	Denmark to Jackson to Lexington	Madison, Henderson	TN	35.52°N 89.03°W	May 4	04:35–05:10	39 mi (63 km)	880 yd (800 m)	11 deaths – See section on this tornado – A devastating and violent tornado began near Denmark and continued northeast into southern Jackson, damaging or destroying numerous structures, including 26 schools, several factories, and other service buildings. Severe disruption to the city's power and water utilities occurred as a result. A stone ball, one of eight created to commemorate the January 17, 1999 Jackson tornado which claimed eight lives, was blown across a street. The violent tornado continued east into Lexington, destroying 36 homes and 7 commercial buildings. An additional 1,000 homes and 73 commercial buildings were damaged, and 86 people were injured.
F3	SE of Denmark to E of Huron	Madison, Henderson	TN	35.48°N 88.93°W	May 4	04:43–05:07	21 mi (34 km)	440 yd (400 m)	Numerous homes were damaged or destroyed.
F2	S of Saint Joseph	Daviess	KY	37.67°N 87.33°W	May 4	04:45–04:46	0.2 mi (0.32 km)	25 yd (23 m)	A mobile home was destroying, injuring two occupants. Several barns and garages were blown down, and one garage was pushed off its foundation. A permanent home suffered minor damage.
F1	Atwood	Carroll	TN	35.97°N 88.67°W	May 5	05:00–05:03	1 mi (1.6 km)	200 yd (180 m)	Six homes were destroyed. An additional 57 homes, in addition to 5 commercial buildings, were damaged. Three people were injured.
F1	SW of Fairview	Hickman, Robertson	TN	35.88°N 87.21°W	May 5	06:24	2.71 mi (4.36 km)	100 yd (91 m)	A well-built home was largely destroyed by a tornado. The tornado was initially thought to have been caused by straight-line winds prior to a 2015 reanalysis by National Weather Service Nashville, Tennessee.
F0	NE of Centerville	Hickman	TN	35.93°N 87.28°W	May 5	06:30	0.1 mi (0.16 km)	10 yd (9.1 m)	A brief tornado caused no damage.
F1	NNE of Nashville	Davidson	TN	36.22°N 86.78°W	May 5	06:40	0.2 mi (0.32 km)	70 yd (64 m)	Widespread roof damage occurred on two streets in the community of Bellshire. Cars were also overturned.
F1	SSW of Franklin	Williamson	TN	35.88°N 86.93°W	May 5	06:43	4.0 mi (6.4 km)	100 yd (91 m)	A tornado caused $3 million in damage south of Franklin, Tennessee, inflicting damage to 85 homes and 5 businesses. Two barns were also destroyed.
F1	La Vergne area	Rutherford	TN	35.99°N 86.59°W	May 5	07:08	0.2 mi (0.32 km)	50 yd (46 m)	Two warehouses as an industrial park sustained heavy damage. The tornado was initially rated F0 before an upgrade in 2015.
F1	Norene area	Wilson	TN	35.99°N 86.59°W	May 5	07:30	0.2 mi (0.32 km)	50 yd (46 m)	A trailer and a vehicle were flipped by the tornado, injuring eight people. The tornado was initially thought to have been caused by straight-line winds prior to a 2015 reanalysis by National Weather Service Nashville, Tennessee.
F0	SE of Castalian Springs	Trousdale	TN	36.37°N 86.26°W	May 5	07:31	1.20 mi (1.93 km)	50 yd (46 m)	A barn was destroyed and two mobile homes were damaged. The tornado was initially thought to have been caused by straight-line winds prior to a 2015 reanalysis by National Weather Service Nashville, Tennessee.
F1	S of Watertown	Wilson	TN	36.05°N 86.10°W	May 5	07:42	0.25 mi (0.40 km)	50 yd (46 m)	Two hundred trees on a farm were blown down. The tornado was initially thought to have been caused by straight-line winds prior to a 2015 reanalysis by National Weather Service Nashville, Tennessee.
F1	NNW of Woodbury	Cannon	TN	35.88°N 86.1°W	May 5	07:45–07:50	3.0 mi (4.8 km)	100 yd (91 m)	Sixty homes sustained damage as a result of the tornado. Numerous utility poles and trees were damaged in the tornado's path. A 2015 analysis suggested that the damage was mostlikely caused by a strong downburst but did not preclude the possibility of an F1 tornado.
F0	Mount Pleasant area	Marshall	MS	34.95°N 89.52°W	May 5	09:45–09:55	1.0 mi (1.6 km)	100 yd (91 m)	Two homes were damaged and numerous trees were blown down.
F0	Lamar area	Benton	MS	34.92°N 89.32°W	May 5	12:55–13:00	0.5 mi (0.80 km)	50 yd (46 m)	A brief tornado caused minor damage.
F0	Walnut area	Tippah	MS	34.95°N 88.88°W	May 5	13:15–13:20	0.5 mi (0.80 km)	50 yd (46 m)	A brief tornado caused minor damage.
F0	Corinth area	Alcorn	MS	34.93°N 88.52°W	May 5	13:55–14:00	0.5 mi (0.80 km)	50 yd (46 m)	A brief tornado caused minor damage.
F0	Guys area	McNairy	TN	35.03°N 88.57°W	May 5	14:05–14:10	0.5 mi (0.80 km)	25 yd (23 m)	A brief tornado caused minor damage.
F0	E of Ethridge	Lawrence	TN	35.35°N 87.24°W	May 5	14:45	0.1 mi (0.16 km)	30 yd (27 m)	A barn was destroyed and a small home sustained slight damage.
F0	Crump area	Hardin	TN	35.22°N 88.32°W	May 5	14:50–14:55	0.8 mi (1.3 km)	50 yd (46 m)	A brief tornado caused minor damage.
F3	W of Belleville	Lincoln	TN	35.25°N 86.58°W	May 5	16:45–16:47	1.6 mi (2.6 km)	700 yd (640 m)	Two people were injured by the tornado. A church sustained heavy damage while a proximate home suffered major roof damage. A frame home was also destroyed.
F0	Humboldt area	Gibson	TN	35.82°N 88.92°W	May 5	18:26–18:30	0.5 mi (0.80 km)	25 yd (23 m)	A brief tornado caused minor damage.
F0	W of Jackson	Madison	TN	35.6°N 89.02°W	May 5	18:45–18:53	4.0 mi (6.4 km)	200 yd (180 m)	Trees and power lines were blown down by the tornado.
F0	SSE of Kingston Springs	Cheatham	TN	36.09°N 87.11°W	May 5	19:55	0.1 mi (0.16 km)	10 yd (9.1 m)	A brief tornado caused no damage.
F1	NW of Science Hill	Pulaski	KY	37.18°N 84.63°W	May 5	21:00–21:11	6.0 mi (9.7 km)	300 yd (270 m)	The tornado damaged or destroyed more than 20 homes and 4 barns. Trees and power lines were also felled.
F1	SSE of Woodbury	Cannon	TN	35.73°N 86.07°W	May 5	21:50	4.1 mi (6.6 km)	150 yd (140 m)	Several homes were damaged.
F0	Yarbro area	Mississippi	AR	35.98°N 89.9°W	May 5	22:40–22:45	0.5 mi (0.80 km)	50 yd (46 m)	A brief tornado caused minor damage.
F1	SW of Leonard	Oakland	MI	42.85°N 83.15°W	May 5	00:00–00:12	1.0 mi (1.6 km)	100 yd (91 m)	A home was unroofed while a camper and trailer were tipped over. A large pole barn was destroyed and several large trees were uprooted.
F0	Gibson area	Gibson	TN	35.87°N 88.85°W	May 5	00:15–00:20	0.5 mi (0.80 km)	50 yd (46 m)	A brief tornado caused minor damage.
F0	Drew area	Sunflower	MS	33.82°N 90.53°W	May 5	01:50–01:51	0.3 mi (0.48 km)	30 yd (27 m)	A tornado knocked down some trees.
F0	N of Bakersfield	Ozark	MO	36.58°N 92.15°W	May 5	03:50	0.2 mi (0.32 km)	20 yd (18 m)	A brief tornado knocked down several trees.
F1	S of Johnston	Edgefield	SC	33.82°N 81.41°W	May 6	05:34	3 mi (4.8 km)	150 yd (140 m)	An F1 tornado moved through Johnston, destroying a wood frame building while damaging a couple of businesses and a few homes.
F0	Ward	Saluda	SC	33.85°N 81.73°W	May 6	05:45–06:45	0.1 mi (0.16 km)	30 yd (27 m)	Some trees were toppled.
F1	SSE of Monetta	Aiken	SC	33.75°N 81.57°W	May 6	05:30–05:32	2 mi (3.2 km)	150 yd (140 m)	Two sheds suffered moderate damage, and numerous trees were downed.
F0	Muscle Shoals	Colbert	AL	34.75°N 87.67°W	May 6	11:33–11:45	0.1 mi (0.16 km)	50 yd (46 m)	Shingles were blown off several homes, power lines were downed, and trees were toppled.
F1	Northern Florence	Lauderdale	AL	34.78°N 87.75°W	May 6	11:35–11:45	10 mi (16 km)	600 yd (550 m)	Five homes sustained roof damage, and three barns were destroyed. At least 100 trees were uprooted and twisted.
F1	NW of Athens	Limestone	AL	34.85°N 87.08°W	May 6	12:20–12:42	15 mi (24 km)	500 yd (460 m)	Seventeen homes sustained minor to major roof damage, and five barns were destroyed. At least 150 trees were uprooted and twisted.
F0	Madison	Madison	AL	34.70°N 86.77°W	May 6	12:58–13:00	0.1 mi (0.16 km)	20 yd (18 m)	Numerous trees were uprooted and snapped.
F1	Meridianville	Madison	AL	34.85°N 86.57°W	May 6	13:16–13:21	1 mi (1.6 km)	200 yd (180 m)	Two homes and businesses sustained roof damage, and a mobile homes was moved off its foundation.
F0	NW of Harwood	Vernon	MO	37.98°N 94.18°W	May 6	14:20	0.2 mi (0.32 km)	20 yd (18 m)	Law enforcement observed a brief tornado.
F0	Hollywood	Jackson	AL	34.72°N 85.98°W	May 6	14:45–14:50	3 mi (4.8 km)	20 yd (18 m)	Two homes sustained minor roof damage, and several trees were uprooted and twisted.
F0	NE of Hollywood	Jackson	AL	34.77°N 85.92°W	May 6	14:58–15:00	1 mi (1.6 km)	20 yd (18 m)	A few trees were uprooted and snapped.
F0	SW of Gerster	St. Clair	MO	37.93°N 93.62°W	May 6	15:10	0.2 mi (0.32 km)	20 yd (18 m)	Several trees were downed by a tornado additionally observed by law enforcement.
F1	Hammondville	DeKalb	AL	34.58°N 85.67°W	May 6	15:13–15:18	2.7 mi (4.3 km)	50 yd (46 m)	One home sustained minor roof damage, and several trees were uprooted.
F0	E of West Point	Cullman	AL	34.23°N 86.92°W	May 6	16:16–16:18	0.1 mi (0.16 km)	20 yd (18 m)	A few trees were twisted and uprooted.
F1	Keithsburg	Cherokee	GA	34.25°N 84.47°W	May 6	16:56–17:05	1 mi (1.6 km)	50 yd (46 m)	The roof of a lumber company, a rental home, and trees and power lines were damaged.
F1	W of Franklin Springs	Franklin	GA	34.30°N 83.25°W	May 6	18:00–18:10	6 mi (9.7 km)	200 yd (180 m)	Several homes and businesses were damaged.
F2	Harrison to Bowman	Madison, Hart, Elbert	GA	34.22°N 83.10°W	May 6	18:12–18:30	7.1 mi (11.4 km)	200 yd (180 m)	Approximately 20 homes sustained moderate to major damage, 2 mobile homes and 2 chicken houses were destroyed, and a number of other outbuildings were destroyed. A garage and auto shop, an adjacent pickup truck, a block shop, and a fishing boat were all likewise demolished. Numerous trees were snapped or uprooted. Twelve people were injured.
F1	Ruckersville	Elbert	GA	34.18°N 82.82°W	May 6	18:45–18:57	6 mi (9.7 km)	50 yd (46 m)	Numerous trees and power lines were blown down.
F0	SE of Whiteman AFB to Sedalia	Johnson, Pettis	MO	38.67°N 93.52°W	May 6	19:48–20:15	22 mi (35 km)	50 yd (46 m)	A playhouse was destroyed, large concrete I-blocks were overturned, a truck was blown sideways, and trees were snapped or uprooted. Two men were injured while seeking shelter in a shed.
F0	Calhoun Falls	Abbeville	SC	34.10°N 82.60°W	May 6	19:10–19:15	3 mi (4.8 km)	25 yd (23 m)	A few trees and power lines were downed.
F0	SE of Troy	McCormick	SC	33.95°N 82.30°W	May 6	19:25	2 mi (3.2 km)	50 yd (46 m)	A few trees were downed.
F0	E of Lincolnton	Lincoln	GA	33.75°N 82.38°W	May 6	19:57–20:00	3 mi (4.8 km)	50 yd (46 m)	A sheriff reported an intermittent tornado.
F0	SE of Spring Brook	Williams	ND	48.18°N 103.43°W	May 6	19:58–20:00	0 mi (0 km)	30 yd (27 m)	A brief tornado occurred in a landfill.
F0	E of Humboldt	Allen	KS	37.82°N 95.30°W	May 6	21:13	0.5 mi (0.80 km)	55 yd (50 m)	A trained storm spotter reported a brief tornado.
F0	S of Warsaw	Benton	MO	38.22°N 93.38°W	May 6	21:20	0.2 mi (0.32 km)	25 yd (23 m)	A few trees were downed.
F0	W of Harper	St. Clair	MO	38.07°N 93.55°W	May 6	21:25	0.2 mi (0.32 km)	25 yd (23 m)	Local law enforcement observed a brief tornado.
F0	S of Versailles to Eldon	Morgan, Miller	MO	38.37°N 92.82°W	May 6	21:27–21:52	13 mi (21 km)	100 yd (91 m)	Trees were damaged.
F0	W of Laurie to Sunrise Beach	Camden, Morgan	MO	38.25°N 93.05°W	May 6	21:28–21:50	15 mi (24 km)	100 yd (91 m)	A tornado downed trees as it crossed the Camden–Morgan county line four times.
F0	NW of Quincy	Hickory	MO	38.03°N 93.50°W	May 6	21:35	0.2 mi (0.32 km)	20 yd (18 m)	A few trees were downed.
F0	Sunrise Beach	Camden	MO	38.18°N 92.78°W	May 6	21:35	0.2 mi (0.32 km)	20 yd (18 m)	Numerous trees were downed.
F0	Bentonville	Benton	MO	38.10°N 93.45°W	May 6	21:40	0.2 mi (0.32 km)	25 yd (23 m)	A few trees were downed.
F0	S of Fort Scott	Bourbon	KS	37.78°N 94.70°W	May 6	21:40	0.1 mi (0.16 km)	10 yd (9.1 m)	A storm chaser observed a brief tornado.
F0	Eldon	Miller	MO	38.35°N 92.58°W	May 6	21:50	0.2 mi (0.32 km)	20 yd (18 m)	Law enforcement reported a brief tornado.
F0	SE of Keefeton	Muskogee	OK	35.57°N 95.32°W	May 6	22:11	0.2 mi (0.32 km)	50 yd (46 m)	A storm chaser reported a brief tornado.
F1	SW of Hemingway	Williamsburg	SC	33.75°N 79.5°W	May 6	22:20–22:26	3.8 mi (6.1 km)	25 yd (23 m)	Two singlewide mobile homes were overturned; a third had its roof ripped off and dropped on a vehicle. A tobacco warehouse was destroyed and a farm supply building was damaged. Trees were felled onto two mobile homes and two vehicles. Three people were hospitalized.
F1	N of Waynesville	Pulaski	MO	37.90°N 92.20°W	May 6	22:55	1 mi (1.6 km)	100 yd (91 m)	Several homes were damaged and numerous trees and power lines were downed.
F1	Summerville	Dorchester	SC	33.05°N 80.11°W	May 6	22:58–23:05	3 mi (4.8 km)	75 yd (69 m)	A large section of an industrial plant's roof was ripped off, and several homes likewise sustained roof damage. Trees were downed, and 4,000 lb (1,800 kg) bales of steel wire were displaced.
F0	Rolla	Phelps	MO	37.95°N 91.77°W	May 6	23:13	0.2 mi (0.32 km)	20 yd (18 m)	Local law enforcement observed a brief tornado.
F1	W of St. Clair	Franklin	MO	38.35°N 91.02°W	May 6	23:32–23:34	1 mi (1.6 km)	80 yd (73 m)	A few outbuildings were damaged, and trees and power lines were downed.
F0	N of Dadeville	Dade	MO	37.48°N 93.68°W	May 6	23:40	0.2 mi (0.32 km)	20 yd (18 m)	Several trees were downed.
F0	Morrisville	Polk	MO	37.48°N 93.43°W	May 6	23:54	0.2 mi (0.32 km)	20 yd (18 m)	Local law enforcement observed a brief tornado.
F1	S of Montreal	Camden	MO	37.90°N 92.60°W	May 6	23:55	0.2 mi (0.32 km)	25 yd (23 m)	One home sustained minor structural damage.
F0	W of Olive	Dallas	MO	37.45°N 93.18°W	May 6	00:15	0.2 mi (0.32 km)	25 yd (23 m)	A few trees were downed.
F0	WSW of Ware	Jefferson	MO	38.18°N 90.75°W	May 6	00:25	0.1 mi (0.16 km)	50 yd (46 m)	A few trees were snapped and downed.
F0	De Soto	Jefferson	MO	38.15°N 90.57°W	May 6	00:30–00:32	0.2 mi (0.32 km)	50 yd (46 m)	A bowing thunderstorm produced a brief tornado that damaged trees.
F0	W of Lebanon	Laclede	MO	37.67°N 92.68°W	May 6	00:35	0.2 mi (0.32 km)	50 yd (46 m)	Local law enforcement reported a brief tornado.
F0	S of Flora	Madison	MS	32.52°N 90.32°W	May 6	00:52–00:54	1 mi (1.6 km)	30 yd (27 m)	Several trees were downed.
F2	SW of Marble Hill	Bollinger	MO	37.25°N 90.12°W	May 6	01:04–01:06	0.8 mi (1.3 km)	100 yd (91 m)	A mobile home, a house, and a barn were destroyed.
F1	NE of Renault	Monroe	IL	38.17°N 90.12°W	May 6	01:10–01:16	4 mi (6.4 km)	60 yd (55 m)	Several grain silos were destroyed, half of a barn's roof was ripped off, a home similarly suffered minor roof damage, and numerous trees were snapped or uprooted.
F0	E of Marble Hill	Bollinger	MO	37.30°N 89.88°W	May 6	01:18	0.3 mi (0.48 km)	50 yd (46 m)	An outbuilding was destroyed; otherwise, damage was confined to trees.
F1	SE of Red Bud	Randolph	IL	38.17°N 89.92°W	May 6	01:30–01:31	0.5 mi (0.80 km)	60 yd (55 m)	A home had its roof ripped off and south and west facing walls severely damaged. One machine shed was destroyed while a second was moved off its foundation. Several large trees were snapped.
F1	S of Burfordville	Cape Girardeau	MO	37.33°N 89.82°W	May 6	01:31–01:33	1 mi (1.6 km)	50 yd (46 m)	A barn was completely destroyed and an old farmhouse was partially destroyed. Numerous trees were downed.
F0	Walsh	Randolph	IL	38.08°N 89.85°W	May 6	01:35	0.1 mi (0.16 km)	25 yd (23 m)	A storm chaser reported a brief tornado.
F3	Jackson	Cape Girardeau	MO	37.38°N 89.67°W	May 6	01:45–01:50	2 mi (3.2 km)	50 yd (46 m)	A significant tornado ripped the roof off, and blew the windows out, of a police and fire headquarters building. The hazardous materials trailer and communication van on the property, in addition to numerous other vehicles along the tornado's path, were overturned. In total, about 200 structures sustained damage. About 140 homes suffered minor damage, 43 homes sustained major damage, and 22 homes were destroyed. This included 6 mobile homes and 4 apartment buildings. Additionally, 3 businesses were destroyed, including a bakery, while 4 others suffered major damage, including a storage company and a woodworking business. Numerous trees were snapped or uprooted. Two people were injured.
F0	Miller City	Alexander	IL	37.12°N 89.37°W	May 6	01:57	0.3 mi (0.48 km)	30 yd (27 m)	A brief tornado damaged some trees.
F1	Trail of Tears State Park	Cape Girardeau	MO	37.40°N 89.48°W	May 6	02:11–02:18	3 mi (4.8 km)	50 yd (46 m)	Several sheds and barns, in addition to a rental home, were destroyed. One other house and metal buildings were damaged. Numerous trees were downed, some onto structures.
F4	New Grand Chain to Golconda	Pulaski, Massac, Pope	IL	37.25°N 89.03°W	May 6	02:32–03:42	33 mi (53 km)	1,000 yd (910 m)	2 deaths – See section on this tornado – 33 people were injured.
F1	NE of Benton	Scott	MO	37.15°N 89.57°W	May 6	03:22–03:33	5 mi (8.0 km)	200 yd (180 m)	Numerous trees were downed, homes sustained minor damage, and a vehicle was blown around on Interstate 55.
F0	S of Cypress	Johnson	IL	37.32°N 89.02°W	May 6	03:27	0.2 mi (0.32 km)	30 yd (27 m)	Trees were damaged.
F2	S of Miller City, IL to W of Lovelaceville, KY	Alexander (IL), Mississippi (MO), Ballard (KY)	IL, MO, KY	37.05°N 89.35°W	May 6	03:27–04:00	25 mi (40 km)	400 yd (370 m)	A strong tri-state tornado began in Illinois, overturning three tractor-trailer rigs and damaging dozens of homes and businesses. Of those structures, one house was destroyed, resulting in the injury of one child, while four others sustained major damage. The rest of the homes suffered mainly minor damage. The tornado continued into rural Missouri before crossing into Kentucky, where intense damage to trees and generally lesser damage to several homes occurred.
F2	W of Mantachie	Lee, Itawamba	MS	34.32°N 88.55°W	May 6	03:30–03:33	1 mi (1.6 km)	100 yd (91 m)	Seven mobile homes were destroyed; another mobile home and a house were damaged. A couple of barns and outbuildings, plus a carport, were demolished. Two vehicles were rolled onto their roofs. Numerous trees were downed.
F0	NNE of Reevesville	Johnson	IL	37.37°N 88.72°W	May 6	03:47	0.2 mi (0.32 km)	30 yd (27 m)	Trees were damaged.
F0	E of Samoth	Massac	IL	37.33°N 88.77°W	May 6	03:50	0.2 mi (0.32 km)	30 yd (27 m)	Trees were damaged.
F2	NW of Metropolis	Massac	IL	37.23°N 88.83°W	May 6	03:55–04:02	4 mi (6.4 km)	50 yd (46 m)	A business was destroyed, and the roofs of several houses were severely damaged or ripped off. Numerous trees and seven power poles were downed.
F0	W of Melber	McCracken	KY	36.95°N 88.82°W	May 6	04:12–04:15	2 mi (3.2 km)	75 yd (69 m)	Trees were snapped or uprooted.
F1	Lone Oak	McCracken	KY	37.03°N 88.67°W	May 6	04:17–04:22	3.5 mi (5.6 km)	80 yd (73 m)	Numerous trees were snapped or uprooted.
F1	NW of Boaz	Graves	KY	36.93°N 88.68°W	May 6	04:22–04:23	0.5 mi (0.80 km)	125 yd (114 m)	A mobile home was moved off its foundation and damaged. Two nearby homes sustained roof damage.
F0	NE of Buchanan	Henry	TN	36.48°N 88.15°W	May 6	04:25–04:30	1 mi (1.6 km)	75 yd (69 m)	Large trees were twisted and snapped.
F1	W of Symsonia	Graves	KY	36.93°N 88.53°W	May 6	04:32–04:34	1 mi (1.6 km)	100 yd (91 m)	Several large trees were uprooted.
F1	SE of Clinton to S of Bell City	Hickman, Graves	KY	36.60°N 88.85°W	May 6	04:32–05:02	22 mi (35 km)	50 yd (46 m)	An open aluminum equipment shed was heavily damaged, a garage attached to a house was destroyed, roofs were damaged, and trees were downed.
F1	NW of Benton	Marshall	KY	36.95°N 88.45°W	May 6	04:38–04:41	2 mi (3.2 km)	100 yd (91 m)	Barns and sheds were damaged. Numerous trees were snapped or uprooted.
F2	E of Mineola to NW of Jefferson	Wood, Upshur, Harrison, Marion	TX	32.67°N 95.45°W	May 6	04:45–06:18	54.4 mi (87.5 km)	880 yd (800 m)	An old frame house and two mobile homes were destroyed; nine others were damaged. A construction trailer was rolled several times. Power lines and numerous trees were downed.
F0	SE of Briensburg	Marshall	KY	36.88°N 88.28°W	May 6	04:50	0.5 mi (0.80 km)	80 yd (73 m)	Large trees were downed.
F1	SE of Morganfield to Robards	Union, Henderson	KY	37.63°N 87.83°W	May 6	04:52–05:21	15 mi (24 km)	100 yd (91 m)	Several large barns and three mobile homes were destroyed. A farm was heavily damaged. An empty grain silo, in addition to numerous trees, were damaged.
F1	SE of Briensburg	Marshall	KY	36.85°N 88.27°W	May 6	04:55	0.5 mi (0.80 km)	80 yd (73 m)	Sheds and barns were damaged. Large trees were downed.
F1	S of Bethpage	Sumner	TN	36.40°N 86.31°W	May 7	06:30	1 mi (1.6 km)	50 yd (46 m)	A mobile home was swept off its foundation and landed upside down about 200 ft (61 m) away. One occupant was injured. This tornado was incorrectly listed as thunderstorm wind damage prior to a 2015 reanalysis.
F1	ENE of Arkadelphia	Dallas, Hot Spring	AR	34.13°N 92.83°W	May 7	07:03–07:14	4 mi (6.4 km)	300 yd (270 m)	An F1 tornado caused extensive tree damage.
F0	NW of Baldwin (TX) to W of Oil City (LA)	Harrison, Marion, Caddo	TX, LA	32.73°N 94.27°W	May 7	07:10–07:41	13 mi (21 km)	25 yd (23 m)	Damage was confined to trees.
F1	S of Gillett	Arkansas	AR	34.07°N 91.40°W	May 7	10:16–10:23	2.9 mi (4.7 km)	350 yd (320 m)	Two storage buildings were demolished. Several farm sheds, houses, and a utility shed were damaged. Several trees and power poles were downed.
F1	S of Downsville	Lincoln, Union	LA	32.60°N 92.43°W	May 7	10:43–10:58	5.3 mi (8.5 km)	100 yd (91 m)	About a dozen homes were damaged, two of them significantly after their roofs were removed; other houses sustained minor to moderate damage. Numerous outbuildings were damaged. A trailer and a shed were tossed over a house. Two barns were destroyed. Trees were snapped.
F2	NE of Houston to NE of Aberdeen	Chickasaw, Monroe	MS	33.95°N 88.93°W	May 7	14:25–15:20	27.5 mi (44.3 km)	100 yd (91 m)	A long-tracked tornado damaged or destroyed 40 structures in Chickasaw County. It destroyed 35 homes and damaged an additional 117 others in Monroe County. Several barns, sheds, and outbuildings were likewise damaged. A cow and a calf were killed.
F1	N of Vernon	Lamar	AL	33.78°N 88.12°W	May 7	16:11–16:12	0.5 mi (0.80 km)	25 yd (23 m)	Trees and power lines were downed.
F1	SW of Townley	Walker	AL	33.82°N 87.50°W	May 7	17:11–17:15	2.4 mi (3.9 km)	40 yd (37 m)	One barn was damaged and numerous trees were downed.
F1	NW of Pell City	St. Clair	AL	33.65°N 86.35°W	May 7	19:10–19:16	4.5 mi (7.2 km)	50 yd (46 m)	A mobile home was destroyed, a few other buildings were damaged, and many trees and power lines were downed.
F1	S of Munford	Talladega	AL	33.52°N 86.02°W	May 7	19:40–19:46	4.6 mi (7.4 km)	50 yd (46 m)	One house was destroyed and several others were damaged. Numerous trees and power lines were downed.
F1	S of Wilsonville	Shelby, Talladega	AL	33.18°N 86.47°W	May 7	19:45–19:49	1.3 mi (2.1 km)	50 yd (46 m)	Several structures were damaged, and numerous trees were downed.
F1	N of Carthage to S of Pine Bluff	Dallas, Grant, Jefferson	AR	34.12°N 92.52°W	May 7	19:46–20:49	27.2 mi (43.8 km)	150 yd (140 m)	Numerous trees were downed.
F0	E of Forest	Scott	MS	32.37°N 89.40°W	May 7	20:20–20:21	0.3 mi (0.48 km)	30 yd (27 m)	A few trees were downed.
F0	E of Bennett	Adams	CO	39.75°N 104.28°W	May 7	20:30	0.1 mi (0.16 km)	50 yd (46 m)	A trained storm spotter observed a brief tornado that caused no damage.
F0	ESE of Moody	St. Clair	AL	33.57°N 86.43°W	May 7	20:21–20:22	0.2 mi (0.32 km)	25 yd (23 m)	Trees were downed.
F0	NW of Millerville	Clay	AL	33.25°N 86.00°W	May 7	20:41–20:43	1.2 mi (1.9 km)	70 yd (64 m)	A house sustained minor damage to its siding and exterior trim. A number of trees were downed.
F0	N of Chunky	Newton	MS	32.33°N 88.93°W	May 7	20:45–20:46	0.5 mi (0.80 km)	30 yd (27 m)	A building suffered roof damage. A few trees were downed.
F0	SE of Ashland	Clay	AL	33.25°N 85.83°W	May 7	20:57–21:00	1.1 mi (1.8 km)	50 yd (46 m)	A few small trees were downed, and a couple of light posts were damaged.
F0	Lineville	Clay	AL	33.32°N 85.75°W	May 7	21:08–21:11	1.2 mi (1.9 km)	20 yd (18 m)	Several trees were broken and a few roofs were damaged.
F1	Warrenton	Fauquier	VA	38.72°N 77.83°W	May 7	21:25	5 mi (8.0 km)	75 yd (69 m)	Trees were downed and minor structural damage occurred.
F1	S of Wedowee to E of Woodland	Randolph	AL	33.28°N 85.48°W	May 7	21:40–22:00	12.9 mi (20.8 km)	500 yd (460 m)	Several trees were downed and a few buildings were damaged.
F0	W of Centralhatchee	Heard	GA	33.37°N 85.27°W	May 7	22:15–22:16	0.1 mi (0.16 km)	50 yd (46 m)	A house and several nearby structures sustained damage. One barn was lifted off its foundation. A second, much larger one was severely damaged along with a nearby shed and several fences. Trees were downed.
F0	N of Franklin	Heard	GA	33.33°N 85.10°W	May 7	22:20–22:21	0.2 mi (0.32 km)	50 yd (46 m)	A weak tornado along an intermittent path downed trees.
F0	SE of Myrtlewood	Marengo	AL	32.25°N 87.93°W	May 7	22:31–22:32	0.1 mi (0.16 km)	40 yd (37 m)	An Alabama state trooper observed a tornado.
F0	WSW of Dresden	Coweta	GA	33.40°N 84.87°W	May 7	22:31–22:32	0.1 mi (0.16 km)	25 yd (23 m)	A couple of trees were downed.
F0	W of Mechanicsville	St. Mary's	MD	38.45°N 76.80°W	May 7	23:23	0.5 mi (0.80 km)	75 yd (69 m)	Some agricultural buildings were damaged.
F0	NE of Loveville	St. Mary's	MD	38.38°N 76.65°W	May 7	23:30	2 mi (3.2 km)	100 yd (91 m)	Trees and power lines were downed.
F1	NE of Baird	Callahan	TX	32.47°N 99.32°W	May 7	00:50	3 mi (4.8 km)	500 yd (460 m)	An old wooden school building and a shed were destroyed. Trees were snapped and fences were damaged.
F0	NW of Cisco	Eastland	TX	32.40°N 98.98°W	May 7	01:00	0.3 mi (0.48 km)	50 yd (46 m)	A National Weather Service employee observed a tornado.
F0	NE of Fargo	Wilbarger	TX	34.32°N 99.25°W	May 7	03:18	0.2 mi (0.32 km)	20 yd (18 m)	Storm spotters observed a tornado.
F1	E of Duncan	Stephens	OK	34.45°N 97.87°W	May 8	06:08–06:12	3 mi (4.8 km)	200 yd (180 m)	Five barns, a pickup truck, and a camper sustained major damage. Three homes also sustained roof damage. Power lines, fences, and numerous trees were downed.
F0	W of Velma	Stephens	OK	34.45°N 97.72°W	May 8	06:17	0.5 mi (0.80 km)	30 yd (27 m)	An Oklahoma resident observed a tornado over open country; no damage was reported.
F2	SW of Ringling	Jefferson	OK	34.17°N 97.67°W	May 8	06:32–06:43	6 mi (9.7 km)	150 yd (140 m)	Several houses had some or all of their roofs ripped off, and additional homes suffered damage to their shingles. Four barns were damaged or destroyed, including a pole barn that had its support poles pulled out of the ground. A cinder block building was collapsed, and many trees and power lines were downed or damaged. Three horses were injured.
F2	S of Overbrook	Love	OK	34.05°N 97.17°W	May 8	07:23–07:33	4 mi (6.4 km)	440 yd (400 m)	A double-wide mobile home was demolished, a brick home had two of its walls and its roof removed, and four other houses were heavily damaged as well. Two barns were damaged, and a tractor-trailer was blown off Interstate 35.
F2	W of Oakland	Marshall	OK	34.07°N 96.95°W	May 8	07:54–08:08	7 mi (11 km)	300 yd (270 m)	A wood frame house lost its roof and two walls, and two barns nearby also had their roofs removed. A 40 ft × 100 ft (12 m × 30 m) barn and three tractors were heavily damaged. One such tractor was hooked up to a hay baler and was moved 100 yd (91 m).
F1	W of Summerfield	Le Flore	OK	34.88°N 94.95°W	May 8	11:04–11:12	4 mi (6.4 km)	100 yd (91 m)	A small barn and a chicken house were destroyed. Several trees were uprooted.
F0	W of Cooter	Pemiscot	MO	36.05°N 89.85°W	May 8	16:40–16:45	1 mi (1.6 km)	75 yd (69 m)	Several power lines were knocked down.
F0	SE of Brighton	Adams	CO	39.97°N 104.78°W	May 8	17:10	0.1 mi (0.16 km)	50 yd (46 m)	A trained storm spotter observed a brief tornado that caused no damage.
F0	N of Watkins	Adams	CO	39.83°N 104.60°W	May 8	17:17	0.1 mi (0.16 km)	50 yd (46 m)	A trained storm spotter observed a brief tornado that caused no damage.
F0	N of Mead	Weld	CO	40.25°N 105.00°W	May 8	18:05	0.1 mi (0.16 km)	50 yd (46 m)	A trained storm spotter observed a brief tornado that caused no damage.
F0	N of Strasburg	Weld	CO	39.73°N 104.30°W	May 8	18:13	0.1 mi (0.16 km)	50 yd (46 m)	A trained storm spotter observed a brief tornado that caused no damage.
F1	Trenton	Gibson	TN	35.90°N 88.90°W	May 8	18:20–18:30	4 mi (6.4 km)	100 yd (91 m)	A scoreboard was destroyed, a barn was damaged, and several trees were downed.
F1	SE of Brush	Morgan	CO	40.13°N 103.45°W	May 8	19:05	0.1 mi (0.16 km)	50 yd (46 m)	Trees and fences were damaged.
F0	E of Tappahannock	Essex	VA	37.93°N 76.85°W	May 8	19:15	0.2 mi (0.32 km)	50 yd (46 m)	Law enforcement reported a brief tornado that caused no damage.
F0	W of Staunton	Macoupin	IL	39.02°N 89.88°W	May 8	20:00–20:01	0.2 mi (0.32 km)	50 yd (46 m)	A local farmer reported a brief tornado.
F0	Jamestown	Cloud	KS	39.60°N 97.87°W	May 8	20:32	0.1 mi (0.16 km)	60 yd (55 m)	A trained storm spotter reported a brief tornado.
F0	NNW of Newcastle	McClain	OK	35.30°N 97.62°W	May 8	22:00	0.2 mi (0.32 km)	30 yd (27 m)	Two storm chasers reported a brief tornado in an open field.
F0	WSW of Moore	Cleveland	OK	35.32°N 97.57°W	May 8	22:04–22:08	2.3 mi (3.7 km)	100 yd (91 m)	A weak tornado caused damage primarily to fences, awnings, and outdoor recreational equipment. Some structural damage occurred as a result of fallen trees. Several canoes in a backyard pond were thrown at least 100 ft (30 m), and a pontoon boat on a trailer was also overturned.
F4	Moore to Oklahoma City to Choctaw	Cleveland, Oklahoma	OK	35.33°N 97.53°W	May 8	22:10–22:38	17.3 mi (27.8 km)	700 yd (640 m)	See section on this tornado – 134 people were injured.
F0	SSE of Oskaloosa	Clay	IL	38.72°N 88.63°W	May 8	22:15	0.1 mi (0.16 km)	10 yd (9.1 m)	An emergency manager reported a brief tornado that caused no damage.
F1	W of Holmesville to Filley	Gage	NE	40.18°N 96.68°W	May 8	22:20–22:29	7 mi (11 km)	150 yd (140 m)	A farmstead, farm building, and trees were damaged. A 35 ft (10 m) in Filley had a 30 ft × 50 ft (10 m × 15 m) section of its roof ripped off.
F0	SE of Wamego	Pottawatomie	KS	39.17°N 96.27°W	May 8	23:05	0.1 mi (0.16 km)	60 yd (55 m)	Law enforcement reported a brief tornado over open country.
F0	N of Red Rock	Noble	OK	36.47°N 97.18°W	May 8	23:08–23:10	0.8 mi (1.3 km)	50 yd (46 m)	Trees were damaged.
F1	Beaumont	Butler	KS	37.63°N 96.57°W	May 8	23:13–23:17	2 mi (3.2 km)	100 yd (91 m)	A farmstead was damaged.
F0	NW of Piedmont	Greenwood	KS	37.70°N 96.47°W	May 8	23:25–23:28	2 mi (3.2 km)	75 yd (69 m)	A semi-truck was blown off a highway.
F1	E of Reading	Osage	KS	38.48°N 95.93°W	May 8	23:31–23:36	6 mi (9.7 km)	120 yd (110 m)	Farm buildings and machinery were damaged.
F1	N of Hamilton	Greenwood	KS	38.00°N 96.17°W	May 8	23:32–23:37	3 mi (4.8 km)	100 yd (91 m)	One home and a few other farm buildings sustained roof damage.
F3	SE of Osage City to Lyndon to S of Overbrook	Osage	KS	38.58°N 95.75°W	May 8	23:40–00:00	25 mi (40 km)	800 yd (730 m)	A long-tracked, significant tornado caused considerable damage to farm buildings, machinery, and fences.
F3	Osage Nation	Osage	OK	36.58°N 96.72°W	May 8	23:46–00:56	45 mi (72 km)	880 yd (800 m)	A significant, long-lived tornado detached oil tanks from their foundations and rolled them about 0.25 mi (0.40 km). The tornado directly impacted the ghost town Little Chief, destroying an RV, causing considerable tree damage, and killing seven cattle. In this area, the tornado scoured grass. To the northeast, a barn was destroyed, three horses were killed, and both a house and garage were swept off their foundation. The construction of the house appeared to be subpar. Severe tree damage was observed across the Tallgrass Prairie Preserve. Up to 30 power poles were downed.
F3	Toronto to Yates Center to E of Neosho Falls	Woodson, Allen	KS	37.80°N 95.95°W	May 8	23:56–00:45	23 mi (37 km)	350 yd (320 m)	Seven houses, in addition to numerous sheds, garages, and outbuildings, were demolished. Another house had its windows blown out. A 12–15 ft (3.7–4.6 m) oil tank was toppled and leaked profusely. Numerous large trees were completely shredded. Vehicles were overturned, 70 grave markers were broken or upended, and 45 mi (70 km) of fencing was damaged. Stored hay was ruined by embedded wiring and nails. Thousands of acres of crops were destroyed. Three people were injured.
F0	SE of Overbrook	Osage	KS	38.77°N 95.52°W	May 8	00:07	0.1 mi (0.16 km)	60 yd (55 m)	Law enforcement reported a brief tornado over open country.
F0	SW of Burlington	Coffey	KS	38.15°N 95.82°W	May 8	00:10	0.1 mi (0.16 km)	80 yd (73 m)	An emergency manager reported a brief tornado over open country.
F0	ESE of Overbrook	Osage	KS	38.77°N 95.50°W	May 8	00:10	0.1 mi (0.16 km)	60 yd (55 m)	Law enforcement reported a brief tornado over open country.
F0	W of Globe	Douglas	KS	38.78°N 95.47°W	May 8	00:17	0.1 mi (0.16 km)	80 yd (73 m)	An emergency manager reported a brief tornado over open country.
F1	N of Iola	Allen	KS	37.95°N 95.45°W	May 8	00:21–00:29	3 mi (4.8 km)	125 yd (114 m)	An oil tank was toppled, farm vehicles were overturned, several trees were sheared, and power poles were snapped.
F0	SE of Ozawkie	Jefferson	KS	39.22°N 95.45°W	May 8	00:24	0.1 mi (0.16 km)	80 yd (73 m)	Law enforcement reported a brief tornado.
F1	NW of Lone Star	Douglas	KS	38.88°N 95.38°W	May 8	00:26	0.2 mi (0.32 km)	50 yd (46 m)	Some trees were damaged.
F2	SE of Colony to Kincaid to S of Centerville	Allen, Anderson, Linn	KS	38.02°N 95.30°W	May 8	00:38–01:10	22 mi (35 km)	800 yd (730 m)	Seven homes were destroyed and two more were seriously damaged. Many tombstones were upended and mausoleums were damaged at a cemetery. Trees were damaged. Three people were injured.
F2	Lawrence	Douglas	KS	38.02°N 95.30°W	May 8	00:38–01:10	0.7 mi (1.1 km)	250 yd (230 m)	An apartment complex and several surrounding residences sustained major damage. Six people were injured.
F1	W of Stephensport, KY	Perry (IN), Breckinridge (KY)	IN, KY	37.95°N 86.63°W	May 8	00:45–01:03	4 mi (6.4 km)	100 yd (91 m)	Several outbuildings were demolished. Several barns and a large homestead sustained severe damage. A piece of a porch from a house was thrown about 0.25 mi (0.40 km) away into a pond. Numerous trees were uprooted in the Hoosier National Forest. The tornado, originating in Indiana, crossed the Ohio River into Kentucky before dissipating.
F0	S of Dearing	Montgomery	KS	37.05°N 95.72°W	May 8	01:13–01:30	2 mi (3.2 km)	75 yd (69 m)	Law enforcement reported a tornado over open country.
F0	NE of Coffeyville	Montgomery	KS	37.07°N 95.58°W	May 8	01:28	0.5 mi (0.80 km)	50 yd (46 m)	Law enforcement reported a brief tornado over open country.
F0	Altamont	Labette	KS	37.20°N 95.30°W	May 8	01:52	0.5 mi (0.80 km)	55 yd (50 m)	Law enforcement reported a brief tornado.
F0	S of La Tour	Henry, Johnson	MO	38.52°N 94.00°W	May 8	02:21–02:24	3 mi (4.8 km)	50 yd (46 m)	Trees were damaged.
F0	S of La Tour	Johnson	MO	38.72°N 93.68°W	May 8	03:00–03:04	0.5 mi (0.80 km)	50 yd (46 m)	Trees were damaged.
F0	Verona	Augusta	VA	38.20°N 79.00°W	May 9	17:55–18:05	5 mi (8.0 km)	100 yd (91 m)	Three barns were damaged, and trees were downed.
F0	Keene	Albemarle, Fluvanna	VA	37.87°N 78.56667°W	May 9	18:20–18:40	10 mi (16 km)	100 yd (91 m)	Dozens of trees were downed, some onto homes, roads, railroad tracks, and power lines.
F1	E of Amelia	Amelia	VA	37.33°N 77.98333°W	May 9	19:35–19:40	3 mi (4.8 km)	200 yd (180 m)	An F1 tornado caused widespread damage to trees, power lines, and some structures. On a farm, several barns and outbuildings suffered major damage.
F0	Jarratt	Sussex, Southampton	VA	36.82°N 77.46667°W	May 9	20:35–20:45	4 mi (6.4 km)	100 yd (91 m)	Numerous trees were downed.
F0	NW of Drewryville	Southampton	VA	36.75°N 77.33°W	May 9	20:55–21:00	2 mi (3.2 km)	100 yd (91 m)	Trees, outbuildings, and one home were damaged.
F0	NE of Severn	Northampton	NC	36.52°N 77.18°W	May 9	21:10	1 mi (1.6 km)	50 yd (46 m)	An F0 tornado downed several trees.
F1	NE of Severn	Northampton	NC	36.45°N 77.1°W	May 9	21:20	7 mi (11 km)	100 yd (91 m)	An F1 tornado caused severe damage to a truck and a house. It sheared the tops of many large trees and snapped or uprooted numerous others.
F0	Colerain	Bertie	NC	36.20°N 76.77°W	May 9	21:50	1 mi (1.6 km)	50 yd (46 m)	Several trees were downed.
F0	ESE of Colerain	Chowan	NC	36.18°N 76.68°W	May 9	22:00	1 mi (1.6 km)	50 yd (46 m)	Several trees were downed.
F0	Townville	Vance	NC	36.50°N 78.43°W	May 9	22:08	5 mi (8.0 km)	50 yd (46 m)	A marina was damaged, and several trees were downed.
F0	SW of Warrenton	Warren	NC	36.33°N 78.22°W	May 9	22:30	0.5 mi (0.80 km)	20 yd (18 m)	A mobile home was destroyed. Trees were blown down and twisted.
F1	NE of Plymouth	Washington	NC	35.88°N 76.41°W	May 9	22:42–22:50	1 mi (1.6 km)	200 yd (180 m)	An F1 tornado caused $1.6 million in damage to crops. It produced additional damage to farm homes and structures.
F0	W of Chatham	Sangamon	IL	39.67°N 89.72°W	May 9	00:40	0.3 mi (0.48 km)	20 yd (18 m)	A few homes sustained siding damage, several trees were blown down, and an unoccupied semi-truck was blown over.
F0	S of Snow Hill	Greene	NC	35.23°N 77.68°W	May 9	01:10	0.1 mi (0.16 km)	25 yd (23 m)	Law enforcement reported a brief tornado.
F0	NNE of Eakly	Caddo	OK	35.33°N 98.53°W	May 9	01:50	0.2 mi (0.32 km)	25 yd (23 m)	A storm chaser observed a brief tornado over open country.
F1	E of Binger	Caddo	OK	35.32°N 98.23°W	May 9	02:00–02:02	1 mi (1.6 km)	100 yd (91 m)	A pickup camper was thrown 150 yd (140 m), large tree limbs were snapped, and a cotton silo was tossed 50 yd (46 m). A mobile home had its roof peeled away and exterior walls removed.
F1	S of Pierceton	Kosciusko	IN	41.13°N 85.72°W	May 9	02:15–02:16	0.05 mi (0.080 km)	25 yd (23 m)	A minivan was picked up and deposited 10–10 ft (3.0–3.0 m) off a road. Two large trees were snapped. An RV sustained major damage, and debris from that vehicle struck a car, breaking out its windows.
F0	NE of Cogar	Caddo, Grady	OK	35.35°N 98.12°W	May 9	02:17–02:20	1.2 mi (1.9 km)	50 yd (46 m)	A homestead was damaged, a stockade fence was blown over, and a camper trailer was blown sideways. A trampoline was lofted, a swing set was blown over, and tree limbs were snapped.
F1	E of Freeman	Cass	MO	38.60°N 94.53°W	May 9	02:25–02:30	3 mi (4.8 km)	50 yd (46 m)	Several RVs were flipped over, causing injury to one person. Empty fuel tanks nearby were severely damaged.
F0	W of Harrisonville	Cass	MO	38.65°N 94.37°W	May 9	02:44–02:45	0.2 mi (0.32 km)	25 yd (23 m)	A fire department rescue squad reported a brief tornado.
F1	N of Union City	Canadian	OK	35.43°N 97.93°W	May 9	02:53–02:54	0.5 mi (0.80 km)	50 yd (46 m)	A power pole was snapped and two others were blown down. A house sustained minor damage.
F1	Bethany to Warr Acres	Canadian	OK	35.52°N 97.65°W	May 9	03:10–03:14	1.8 mi (2.9 km)	880 yd (800 m)	1 death – A multi-vortex tornado caused F1 damage to several churches, a self-storage facility, airport hangars at Wiley Post Airport, several warehouses, a few houses, and several businesses. At that airport, about 70 airplanes and 40 hangars were damaged or destroyed. Additional damage occurred to trees. A man died when he suffered a fatal head wound while seeking shelter.
F2	SE of Corder to NNE of Blackburn	Lafayette, Saline	MO	39.07°N 93.62°W	May 9	03:15–03:27	10 mi (16 km)	300 yd (270 m)	A machine shed was destroyed. A house, dairy barn, and grain bins were damaged.
F1	NE of Warr Acres	Oklahoma	OK	35.53°N 97.57°W	May 9	03:18	0.5 mi (0.80 km)	50 yd (46 m)	Fencing, aluminum car ports, and the roof of a restaurant was damaged. Tree limbs were downed.
F3	S of Edmond to S of Luther	Oklahoma	OK	35.55°N 97.48°W	May 9	03:29–04:06	17.8 mi (28.6 km)	1,320 yd (1,210 m)	An industrial building, with a steel frame fastened to the concrete foundation by four 1 in (25 mm) diameter steel rods, was demolished; its steel reinforced concrete was pulled out of the ground. One house was completely destroyed and two others were heavily damaged. Numerous other structures, including homes, churches, schools, and farm buildings, were damaged or destroyed. Trees and power lines were downed. A vehicle was tossed 25 yd (23 m). Two people were injured.
F0	N of Mount Leonard	Saline	MO	39.15°N 93.40°W	May 9	03:35–03:37	0.2 mi (0.32 km)	25 yd (23 m)	Law enforcement reported a brief tornado.
F0	Centerview	Johnson	MO	38.75°N 93.85°W	May 9	03:52–03:55	1 mi (1.6 km)	50 yd (46 m)	A fire station sustained minor damage.
F1	S of Luther to SSW of Wellston	Oklahoma, Lincoln	OK	35.60°N 97.20°W	May 9	04:06–04:24	7 mi (11 km)	880 yd (800 m)	A mobile home was destroyed, and numerous houses were damaged. Several sheds and outbuildings were heavily damaged. Trees were snapped or uprooted. A trampoline was thrown about 20 yd (18 m) and bent around a tree trunk. A trailer was pushed onto a truck. A power pole was bent.
F1	Davenport to Stroud	Lincoln	OK	35.70°N 96.77°W	May 9	04:49–05:12	8.1 mi (13.0 km)	880 yd (800 m)	The left field light standards at a baseball field were blown over, and a referee box behind home plate was tossed about 30 yd (27 m), breaking it apart. A sturdy wood-frame carport was collapsed onto a vehicle. Several houses sustained roof damage in Davenport. Metal storage structures were collapsed or had their walls caved in. Vehicle windows were broken. A building behind a fire station saw its south-facing cinder block wall collapsed outward. In total, 70 homes were damaged, of which 6 were rendered uninhabitable, in Stroud. Trees were snapped.
F1	Depew	Creek	OK	35.78°N 96.52°W	May 10	05:25–05:31	2 mi (3.2 km)	300 yd (270 m)	Many trees were snapped or uprooted, and a few structures sustained minor damage.
F0	Burns area	Butler, Marion	KS	38.05°N 96.98°W	May 10	08:00–08:15	10 mi (16 km)	110 yd (100 m)	Trees were damaged or uprooted, including one that fell onto a house. Power poles were sharply leant, and power lines were downed. An outbuilding was partially unroofed, with that debris being impaled into a nearby building.
F0	S of Divernon	Sangamon	IL	39.53°N 89.67°W	May 10	12:53	0.1 mi (0.16 km)	10 yd (9.1 m)	Law enforcement reported a brief tornado in a field.
F0	E of Divernon	Sangamon	IL	39.57°N 89.65°W	May 10	12:55	0.2 mi (0.32 km)	20 yd (18 m)	A barn was destroyed and several trees were downed.
F0	E of Auburn	Sangamon	IL	39.58°N 89.65°W	May 10	12:58–13:00	1 mi (1.6 km)	30 yd (27 m)	A couple of sheds were destroyed, several businesses were damaged, and numerous trees and power poles were downed.
F0	W of Kincaid	Christian	IL	39.58°N 89.43°W	May 10	13:08–13:09	0.3 mi (0.48 km)	20 yd (18 m)	A grain silo was destroyed and several trees were downed.
F0	W of Neoga	Cumberland	IL	39.32°N 88.47°W	May 10	14:45	0.1 mi (0.16 km)	10 yd (9.1 m)	A citizen reported a brief tornado in a field.
F0	SE of Bell Ridge	Edgar	IL	39.45°N 87.70°W	May 10	15:40	0.1 mi (0.16 km)	10 yd (9.1 m)	A fire department rescue squad reported a brief tornado in a field.
F0	N of Cloverdale	Putnam	IN	39.53°N 86.80°W	May 10	15:51–15:53	0.5 mi (0.80 km)	50 yd (46 m)	A tree was downed onto a house and car.
F1	E of Wheeler	Jasper	IL	39.05°N 88.27°W	May 10	16:00–16:02	1.5 mi (2.4 km)	100 yd (91 m)	Numerous trees and power lines were downed. A couple of sheds and two house roofs were damaged.
F3	SE of Maysville to SE of Vanceburg	Mason, Lewis	KY	38.60°N 83.72°W	May 10	20:45–21:25	25 mi (40 km)	200 yd (180 m)	A significant tornado destroyed 21 homes, inflicted major damage to 10 homes, and caused minor damage to 17 homes. Numerous barns, buildings, and garages were damaged or destroyed as well. Seventeen people were injured.
F0	N of Linneus	Linn	MO	39.88°N 93.23°W	May 10	21:02–21:04	0.5 mi (0.80 km)	25 yd (23 m)	A report of a brief tornado was relayed by amateur radio.
F0	SE of Princeton	Mercer	MO	40.30°N 93.45°W	May 10	21:38–21:39	0.1 mi (0.16 km)	25 yd (23 m)	Trees and an outbuilding sustained minor damage.
F1	W of Unionville	Putnam	MO	40.43°N 93.30°W	May 10	21:56–22:03	7 mi (11 km)	100 yd (91 m)	Two houses were damaged and lost their garages. Trees and cars were damaged as well.
F0	NW of Clarence	Macon, Shelby	MO	39.77°N 92.35°W	May 10	22:23–22:34	5.5 mi (8.9 km)	50 yd (46 m)	Trees and powerlines were damaged.
F1	E of Columbia to NW of Leighton	Marion, Mahaska	IA	41.18°N 93.12°W	May 10	22:26–23:02	18.5 mi (29.8 km)	50 yd (46 m)	A trailer was overturned.
F2	S of Baring to S of Medill	Knox, Scotland, Clark	MO	40.22°N 92.20°W	May 10	22:33–23:08	22.1 mi (35.6 km)	200 yd (180 m)	Numerous trees were mangled, farm outbuildings were destroyed, and power poles were snapped. An old abandoned house and two grain bins were also demolished, while another home lost its garage and part of its roof.
F0	W of Unionville	Putnam	MO	40.48°N 93.13°W	May 10	22:35–22:37	0.5 mi (0.80 km)	50 yd (46 m)	An F0 tornado caused minor damage to a barn.
F0	NE of Bethel	Shelby	MO	39.90°N 92.03°W	May 10	22:50	5 mi (8.0 km)	50 yd (46 m)	A piece of farm equipment was damaged and some trees were downed.
F2	SE of Steffenville to Canton to SE of Fountain Green	Lewis (MO), Adams (IL), Hancock (IL)	MO, IL	39.93°N 91.83°W	May 10	23:08–00:30	58.4 mi (94.0 km)	300 yd (270 m)	A strong tornado impacted multiple communities. In Canton, 75–100 structures were damaged, at least 40 of which sustained major damage. A field house was flattened and a two-story building lost its roof at Culver-Stockton College. Four mobile homes were destroyed and four others suffered major damage. In Lima, an additional 40–50 structures were damaged, and two mobile homes were destroyed. Dozens of other homes and outbuildings suffered roof, siding, and window damage elsewhere. Eight people were injured along the tornado's path.
F0	NE of Steffenville	Lewis	MO	40.00°N 91.85°W	May 10	23:10–23:14	4 mi (6.4 km)	50 yd (46 m)	Some trees and powerlines were downed.
F0	North Fork	Monroe	MO	39.62°N 91.93°W	May 10	23:19–23:20	0.2 mi (0.32 km)	40 yd (37 m)	Several large trees were snapped or uprooted.
F0	Clutier	Tama	IA	42.08°N 92.40°W	May 10	23:27	0.1 mi (0.16 km)	25 yd (23 m)	A brief tornado occurred in an open area.
F2	Argyle to N of Viele	Lee	IA	40.53°N 91.58°W	May 10	23:28–23:47	11.5 mi (18.5 km)	200 yd (180 m)	A house was turned and moved off its foundation by 25–40 ft (7.6–12.2 m). Lesser damage was exerted elsewhere.
F3	Monroe City to S of Palmyra	Monroe, Marion, Ralls	MO	39.63°N 91.75°W	May 10	23:30–23:57	14.5 mi (23.3 km)	200 yd (180 m)	In Monroe City, 25 homes sustained roof damage. Farther along the path, multiple barns and machine sheds were completely demolished. Several two-by-four planks were driven into the ground resultant from the destruction of these structures. A garage attached to a home was destroyed. Homes suffered roof damage, and one home had much of its walls collapsed. Numerous trees were snapped or uprooted. A semi-tractor-trailer was overturned.
F0	WNW of Birmingham	Van Buren	IA	40.88°N 92.03°W	May 10	00:10–00:15	4 mi (6.4 km)	100 yd (91 m)	An F0 tornado occurred west-northwest of Birmingham.
F2	N of Liberty to N of Mount Sterling	Adams, Brown, Schuyler	IL	39.90°N 91.08°W	May 10	00:20–01:11	30.8 mi (49.6 km)	300 yd (270 m)	A strong, multi-vortex tornado destroyed several barns and caused extensive damage to additional barns, grain bins, machine sheds, and large trees. One old farm house was demolished while a few other homes suffered lesser damage.
F0	W of Glasgow	Jefferson	IA	40.90°N 91.83°W	May 10	00:23–00:28	5 mi (8.0 km)	100 yd (91 m)	An F0 tornado occurred west-northwest of Birmingham.
F1	NW of Tennessee to E of Roseville	McDonough, Warren	IL	40.47°N 90.88°W	May 10	00:30–01:19	30.8 mi (49.6 km)	200 yd (180 m)	A tornado caused widespread F0 damage, and sporadic F1 damage, along its path.
F1	S of Lockridge to Wapello	Jefferson, Henry, Louisa	IA	40.97°N 91.78°W	May 10	00:33–01:19	30.3 mi (48.8 km)	200 yd (180 m)	A tornado caused F1 damage to farm houses.
F2	NW of Rushville	Schuyler	IL	40.12°N 90.67°W	May 10	01:14–01:20	6 mi (9.7 km)	150 yd (140 m)	A house was destroyed. Numerous silos, machine sheds, and barns were damaged or destroyed. Numerous trees were toppled.
F1	Belmont	Lafayette	WI	42.68°N 90.40°W	May 10	01:15–01:29	7.8 mi (12.6 km)	200 yd (180 m)	A mobile home was destroyed on a farm, injuring one of the occupants inside. On two other farms, the tornado caused varying degrees of damage to homes, barns, wind mills, and decks.
F0	N of New Boston	Mercer	IL	41.20°N 91.03°W	May 10	01:30–01:40	8.3 mi (13.4 km)	100 yd (91 m)	A funnel cloud crossed the Mississippi River and touched down, causing F0 damage.
F1	Ipava	Fulton	IL	40.33°N 90.35°W	May 10	01:32–01:35	3 mi (4.8 km)	400 yd (370 m)	An F1 tornado moved through Ipava, destroying the fire department and numerous trees, powerlines, sheds, and garages. It inflicted roof damage to numerous homes, and one home suffered major damage.
F1	E of Mineral Point	Iowa	WI	42.85°N 90.10°W	May 10	01:39–02:01	8.6 mi (13.8 km)	200 yd (180 m)	Four barns or sheds sustained major damage, two homes sustained moderate damage, and trees sustained considerable damage.
F0	SE of Washington	Beaufort	NC	35.45°N 76.93°W	May 10	01:42	0.1 mi (0.16 km)	50 yd (46 m)	A sheriff reported a brief tornado.
F0	N of Millersburg	Mercer	IL	41.27°N 90.83°W	May 10	01:45–01:50	2.1 mi (3.4 km)	50 yd (46 m)	A tornado caused F0 damage north of Millersburg.
F1	Astoria	Fulton	IL	40.23°N 90.35°W	May 10	01:47–01:50	2.7 mi (4.3 km)	100 yd (91 m)	Several sheds were destroyed and a business was damaged. Numerous trees, powerlines, and power poles were downed.
F0	SE of Reynolds	Mercer, Rock Island	IL	41.30°N 90.70°W	May 10	01:55–02:02	3.8 mi (6.1 km)	50 yd (46 m)	A tornado caused F0 damage along its path.
F0	E of Galva to NW of Wyanet	Henry, Bureau	IL	41.17°N 90.03°W	May 10	01:55–02:32	25.5 mi (41.0 km)	100 yd (91 m)	A long-tracked tornado caused F0 damage along its path.
F1	NW of Topeka	Mason	IL	40.33°N 90.05°W	May 10	02:12–02:20	8 mi (13 km)	150 yd (140 m)	A travel trailer and a garage were demolished. Numerous trees and powerlines were downed.
F2	Manito	Mason	IL	40.40°N 89.80°W	May 10	02:33–02:36	2.5 mi (4.0 km)	100 yd (91 m)	A strong tornado destroyed 4 homes and caused minor to major damage to 24 others. Trees and powerlines were downed. One person was injured.
F1	E of Manito	Mason	IL	40.42°N 89.75°W	May 10	02:38–02:42	2 mi (3.2 km)	100 yd (91 m)	Several barns, sheds, and a garage was destroyed. A few homes sustained minor damage. Numerous trees, powerlines, and power poles were toppled.
F3	SW of South Pekin to Pekin to Morton	Tazewell	IL	40.47°N 89.68°W	May 10	02:45–03:16	17.5 mi (28.2 km)	440 yd (400 m)	A significant tornado destroyed 50 homes and caused minor to major damage to another 80 homes in South Pekin. It crossed the intersection of Interstate 74 and Interstate 155, damaging cars and causing one injury. In Morton, several three story apartment buildings were destroyed and several others were significantly damaged. A couple of adjacent businesses were demolished, and over 100 homes were damaged, some severely. Thirty-two people were injured in total, three seriously.
F0	S of La Moille	Bureau	IL	41.50°N 89.38°W	May 10	01:58–02:03	4.1 mi (6.6 km)	50 yd (46 m)	A tornado caused F0 damage along its path.
F1	N of Morton	Tazewell	IL	40.67°N 89.45°W	May 10	03:16–03:18	1.5 mi (2.4 km)	100 yd (91 m)	Three homes and a business sustained major damage.
F2	SE of Washington to Eureka to N of Roanoke	Tazewell, Woodford	IL	40.67°N 89.37°W	May 10	03:18–03:36	12.5 mi (20.1 km)	300 yd (270 m)	A strong tornado destroyed several homes, outbuildings, and businesses along U.S. Route 24. It damaged additional homes along its path, including in Eureka. Numerous trees, powerlines, and power poles were downed. Four people were injured.
F1	NE of Eureka	Woodford	IL	40.72°N 89.22°W	May 10	03:25–03:35	8 mi (13 km)	200 yd (180 m)	Several barns and outbuildings were destroyed. A couple of homes sustained minor damage. Numerous trees and powerlines were downed.
F1	ENE of Newport	Jackson	AR	35.63°N 91.18°W	May 10	03:25–03:36	0.6 mi (0.97 km)	30 yd (27 m)	A tornado touched down at the Grimes Unit of the Arkansas Department of Correction. It destroyed a large metal barn and a nearby tool shed. Underpinning was ripped from some mobile homes. A carport was overturned, a nearby cotton trailer was moved, and trees were downed.
F3	S of Sacramento	McLean	KY	37.42°N 87.27°W	May 11	06:18–06:21	1.8 mi (2.9 km)	80 yd (73 m)	A tornado destroyed two homes and severely damaged another. Several trees were also thrown a considerable distance by winds estimated at around 170 mph (270 km/h). Two people sustained minor injuries.
F1	Centerville area	Hickman	KY	35.81°N 87.57°W	May 11	07:36	10.8 mi (17.4 km)	100 yd (91 m)	Numerous trees were blown down and two homes suffered roof damage. The tornado was initially thought to have been caused by straight-line winds prior to a 2015 reanalysis by National Weather Service Nashville, Tennessee.
F3	WNW of Franklin	Hickman, Williamson	TN	35.93°N 87.21°W	May 11	07:56–08:22	19.70 mi (31.70 km)	700 yd (640 m)	An F3 tornado destroyed 3 homes and damaged another 43, with roof damage comprising the majority of the damage wrought to homes. Thousands of trees were also blown by the tornado. Total damage amounted to $2.2 million.
F2	SW of Rineyville	Hardin	KY	37.72°N 86.02°W	May 11	08:10–08:19	6.5 mi (10.5 km)	120 yd (110 m)	A tornado touched down intermittently on a path through the community of Rinneyville, damaging or destroying 40 homes; a majority of these residences were mobile homes. Five people were also injured by the tornado.
F1	NE of Nashville to NE of Mount Juliet	Davidson	TN	36.21°N 86.76°W	May 11	08:07–08:17	15.3 mi (24.6 km)	200 yd (180 m)	The homes of roofs and businesses were damaged by a tornado. A car wash was destroyed while other roofs and businesses signs were damaged in Wilson County. The tornado was initially listed as two tornadoes prior to a 2015 reanalysis.
F1	SW of Gallatin	Sumner	TN	36.34°N 86.55°W	May 11	08:19	10.0 mi (16.1 km)	200 yd (180 m)	A tornado damaged 165 homes largely via the felling of trees.
F1	SW of Nolensville	Williamson	TN	35.94°N 86.68°W	May 11	08:28	1.35 mi (2.17 km)	200 yd (180 m)	Tornado damage was limited to the uprooting or snapping of trees.
F3	Walterhill area	Rutherford	TN	35.95°N 86.4°W	May 11	08:45–08:52	6.13 mi (9.87 km)	400 yd (370 m)	A tornado destroyed at least 18 homes and damaged many others. A nearby church was also heavily damaged.
F1	WSW of Munfordville	Hart	KY	37.28°N 85.92°W	May 11	08:59–09:02	2.0 mi (3.2 km)	50 yd (46 m)	Two brief tornado touchdowns occurred within a region of strong straight-line winds, causing damage to the downtown Munfordville area.
F2	SSE of Bohon	Mercer	KY	37.78°N 84.9°W	May 11	09:30–09:40	7.0 mi (11.3 km)	300 yd (270 m)	1 death – A tornado damaged 40 homes of which 12 were destroyed. One person was killed after their mobile home was blown towards the Salt River. In total, the tornado caused $15 million in damage.
F1	Crossville area	Cumberland	TN	35.91°N 85.07°W	May 11	10:19	1.30 mi (2.09 km)	75 yd (69 m)	A tornado impacted the southern portions of Crossville, Tennessee, downing numerous trees and damaging 16 homes. Twent-yone power poles were also broken. South Cumberland Elementary School sustained roof and window damage in addition to the loss of a portable classroom. The tornado was initially thought to have been caused by straight-line winds prior to a 2015 reanalysis.
F1	NW of Paint Lick	Garrard	KY	37.63°N 84.43°W	May 11	10:55–10:56	0.5 mi (0.80 km)	75 yd (69 m)	Downed trees were observed in a pattern indicative of a tornado.
F1	WSW of Happy Landing	Madison	KY	37.63°N 84.43°W	May 11	10:56–10:57	0.5 mi (0.80 km)	75 yd (69 m)	A brief tornado destroyed a born and damaged two homes, two greenhouses, and a garage.
F1	Ontario area	Wayne	NY	43.22°N 77.28°W	May 11	19:30	2.3 mi (3.7 km)	50 yd (46 m)	Near the point of initial touchdown, two homes were damaged. Three more homes were damaged farther along the tornado's path, which consisted of three distinct touchdowns. A number of trees were also downed in addition to a power pole.
F0	E of Perryville	Lycoming	PA	41.32°N 77.08°W	May 11	20:10–20:12	1.3 mi (2.1 km)	75 yd (69 m)	A dozen trees were downed and a barn was unroofed.

== See also ==
- Tornadoes of 2003
- Tornado outbreak sequence of May 3–11, 2003
