= Knob Creek Church of Christ =

Coordinates: 36.5026°N 88.6636°W

Knob Creek Church of Christ located about 5 miles east of Dukedom, Tennessee, was the first Restoration Movement Church established in the Kentucky section of the Jackson land purchase of 1818, but only just so as the original location was very close to the Kentucky-Tennessee border. The Roan's Creek Church of Christ in Carroll County, Tennessee, was the first such congregation formerly established west of the Tennessee River in 1825.

Some of the early settlers arriving in southern Graves County, Kentucky, and northern Weakley County, Tennessee, brought with them the teachings of Barton W. Stone and the "Christians Only" movement, and wanted to have a local church where they could worship. These settlers located John Parkhill from Calloway County, Kentucky, and sent one of their members to summon him to help found the congregation. In June 1834, Parkhill established the congregation, incorporating the "Christians Only" teachings of Stone and the "Reformed Baptist" teachings of Alexander Campbell, Stone and Campbell having merged their movements in 1832.

The church was established in the home of member Simon Foy and his wife Charlotte Simms Foy, who had migrated to the area in about 1828 from Limestone County, Alabama, and whose homestead was on Knob Creek, near the present Clinard farm. The first church building was erected circa 1845, south of the Foy homestead on the border between Kentucky and Tennessee, about a mile west of where the present building stands. Although no longer located on Knob Creek, the congregation retained the original name. This was one of the earliest Restorationist congregations to use the name "Church of Christ", a name now in use by thousands of Restoration Movement congregations worldwide.

The founding members were Simon and Charlotte Foy, their daughters Charlotte and Elizabeth, their sons James and William, John Johnson and his wife Elizabeth, and Uel Olive. Uel's home was used to hold the first meetings of the church; James Olive went on to set up the Silver Creek Church in Illinois.

The Church has since been through three buildings. The latest was built in 1957 and sits on State Line Road, east of Dukedom, Tennessee, on the Kentucky/Tennessee state line. It currently has 19 members. The church jokes about sitting on the state line, and the line is literally in front of the communion table. The minister stands in Kentucky and preaches to the congregation which sits in Tennessee during the services. Many other Churches of Christ have branched from this particular church and are still in existence today.

The current minister is Steve Cochrum. Past ministers include Charles Wall, Dennis Crutchfield, David Wilson, James Shockley and Jimmy Canter.

According to Carl H. Royster's (the great-great-great-great-grandson of Simon and Charlotte Foy) directory "Churches of Christ in the United States", the congregation was established in 1834.
