= Pottsville =

Pottsville usually refers to the city of Pottsville, Pennsylvania, in the United States.

Pottsville may also refer to:

== Other communities ==
- Pottsville, New South Wales, Australia
- Pottsville, Arkansas, United States
- Pottsville, Kentucky, United States
- Pottsville, Texas, United States
- Pottsville, Ontario, Canada - destroyed in 1911 due to Great Porcupine Fire

== Geology ==
- Pottsville Escarpment, a resistant sandstone belt in eastern Kentucky, USA
- Pottsville Formation, a bedrock unit in the Appalachian Mountains of North America

== Sports ==
- Pottsville Colts, a defunct American minor league baseball club that played from 1883 to 1907 in Pennsylvania
- Pottsville Maroons, a now-defunct American football team that played from 1925 to 1929 in Pennsylvania

== Other ==
- Pottsville Area School District (Pennsylvania)

== See also ==
- Pottstown (disambiguation)
