= Bell City =

Bell City may refer to:

- Bell City, Kentucky
- Bell City, Louisiana
- Bell City, Missouri
