= Benjamin Franklin Graves =

Benjamin Franklin Graves may refer to:

- Benjamin Franklin Graves (soldier), (1771–1813) Kentucky state senator and military leader
- Benjamin F. Graves (judge) (1817–1906), a Justice of the Michigan Supreme Court
