= Lynnville, Kentucky =

Unincorporated community in Kentucky, United States

- Unincorporated community
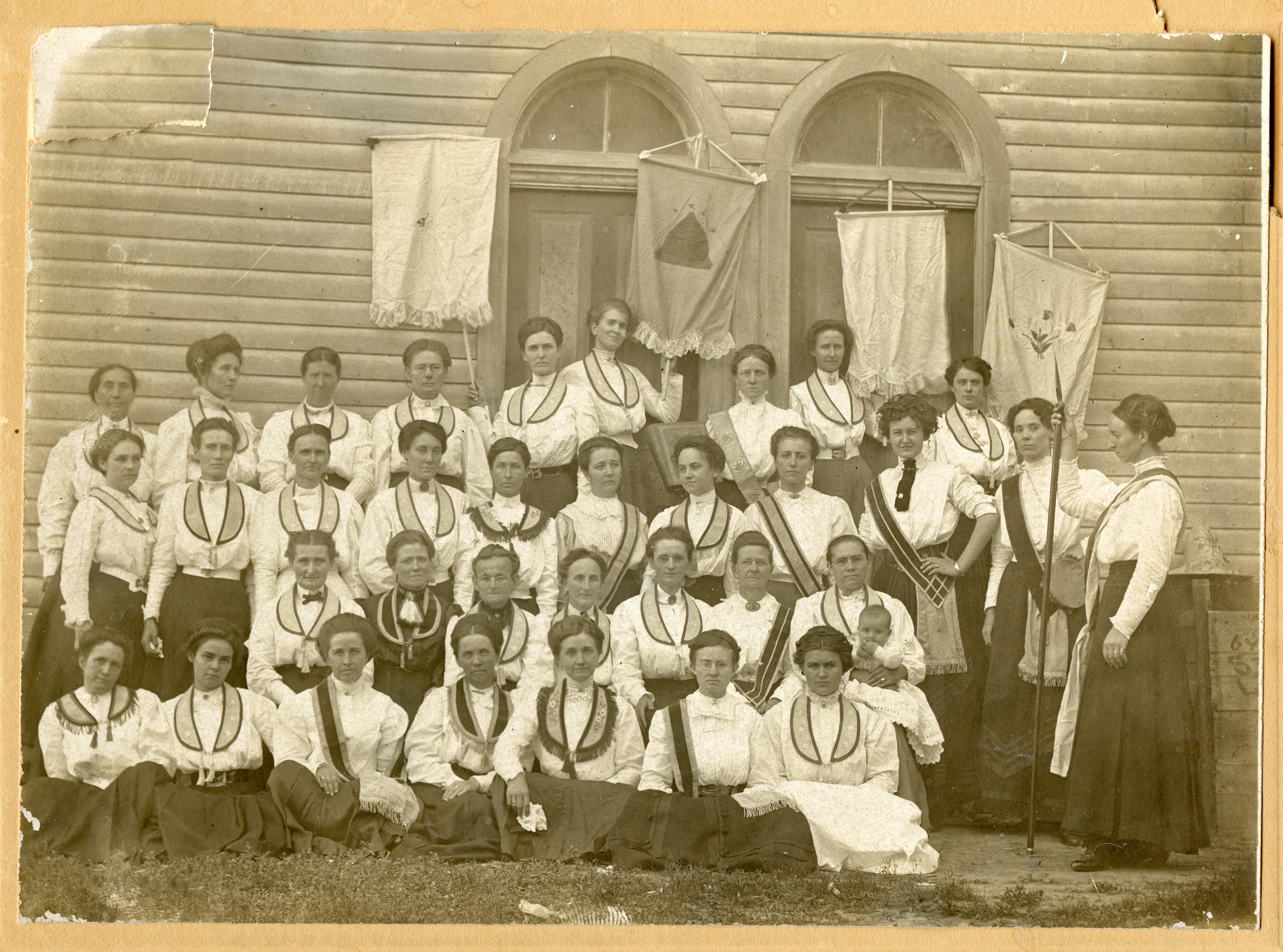
- Rebecca Lodge, Lynnville, 1909

- Location within Kentucky Location within the United States
- Coordinates: 36°33′37″N 88°34′09″W
- Country: United States
- State: Kentucky
- County: Graves
- Elevation: 554 ft (169 m)
- Time zone: UTC-6 (Central (CST))
  - Summer (DST): UTC-5 (CDT)
- ZIP code: 42063
- GNIS feature ID: 497387

Lynnville is an unincorporated community in Graves County, Kentucky, United States. On April 25, 2011, an EF1 tornado that caused some damage, as part of the 2011 Super Outbreak, traveled from Martin, Tennessee to Lynnville.
