= Folsomdale, Kentucky =

Unincorporated community in Kentucky, United States

- Unincorporated community
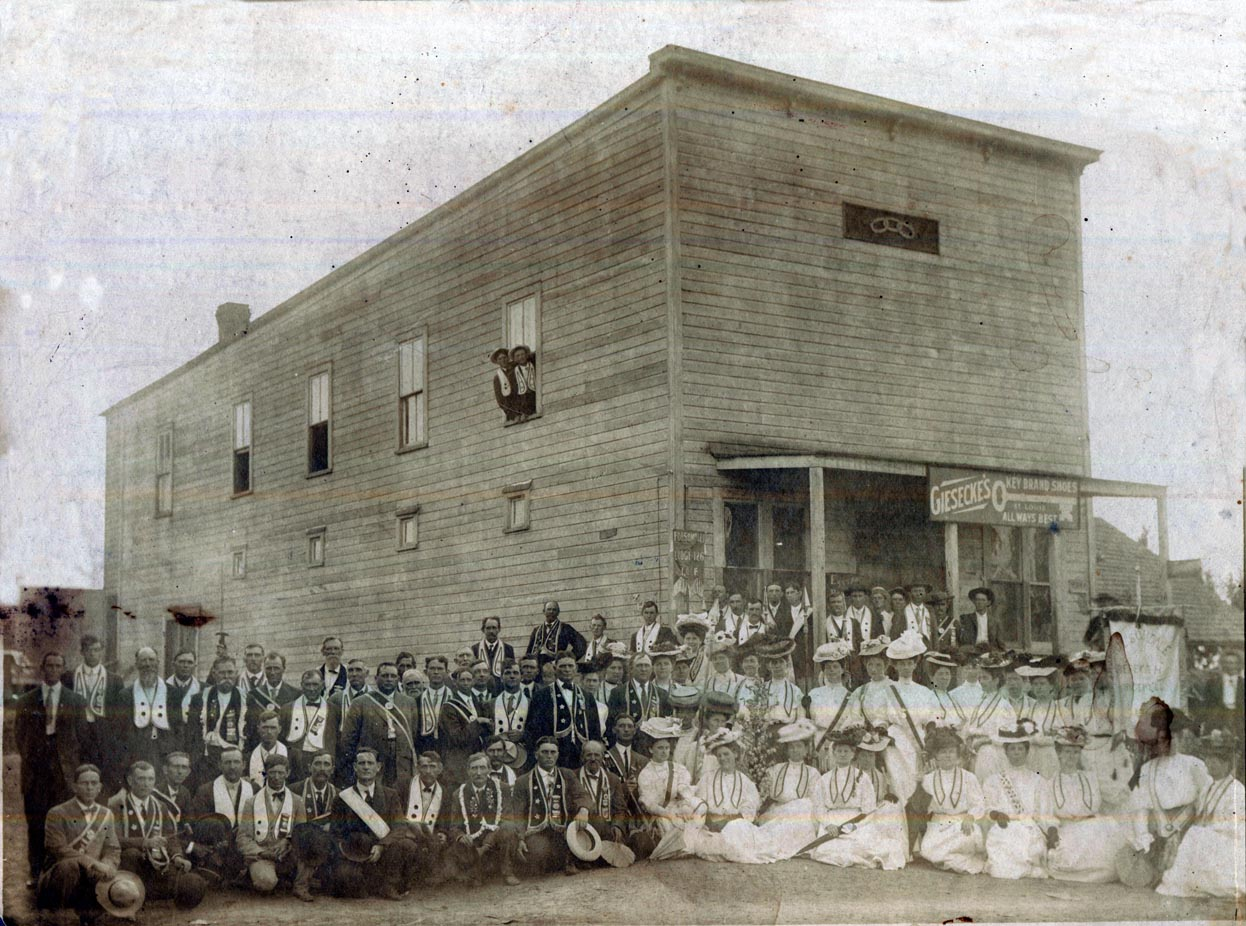
- IOOF of Folsomdale

- Location within Kentucky Location within the United States
- Coordinates: 36°53′01″N 88°40′28″W
- Country: United States
- State: Kentucky
- County: Graves
- Elevation: 443 ft (135 m)
- Time zone: UTC-6 (Central (CST))
  - Summer (DST): UTC-5 (CDT)
- GNIS feature ID: 492294

Folsomdale is an unincorporated community in Graves County, Kentucky, United States.

A post office was opened in the community in 1886, and named for President Cleveland's bride Frances Folsom, who had recently become First Lady at age 21.
