= Graves County, Kentucky =

County in Kentucky, United States

- County
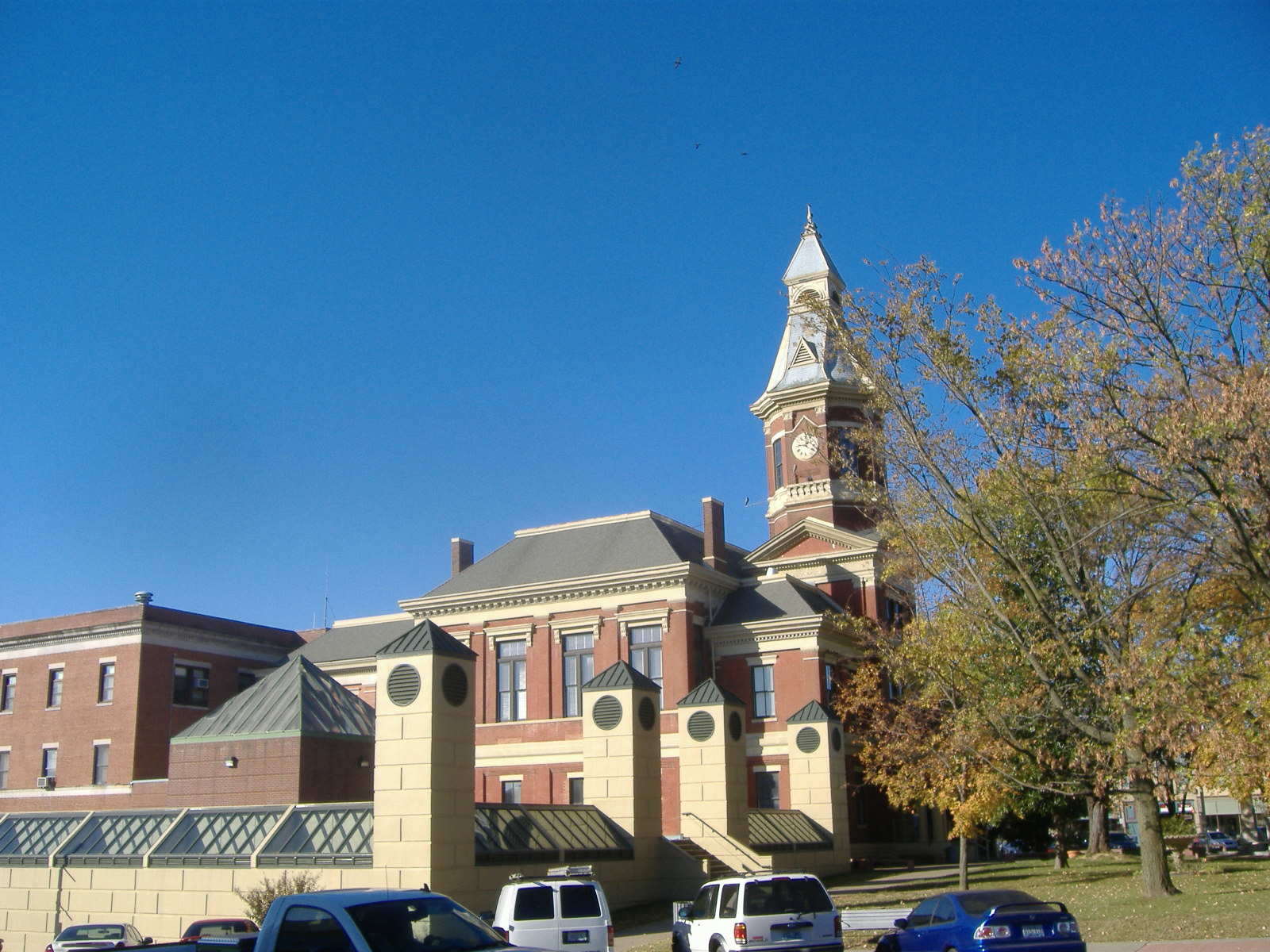
- Graves County Courthouse in Mayfield in 2008, part of the Mayfield Downtown Commercial District; building sustained major damage in a long-tracked tornado on December 10, 2021.

- Location within the U.S. state of Kentucky
- Coordinates: 36°43′N 88°39′W
- Country: United States
- State: Kentucky
- Founded: 1824
- Named for: Benjamin F. Graves
- Seat: Mayfield
- Largest city: Mayfield

Government
  - Judge/Executive: Jesse Perry (I)

Area
  - Total: 557 sq mi (1,440 km^{2})
  - Land: 552 sq mi (1,430 km^{2})
  - Water: 5.0 sq mi (13 km^{2}) 0.9%

Population (2020)
  - Total: 36,649
  - Estimate (2025): 37,050 ▲
  - Density: 66.4/sq mi (25.6/km^{2})
- Time zone: UTC−6 (Central)
  - Summer (DST): UTC−5 (CDT)
- Congressional district: 1st
- Website: gravescounty.ky.gov/Pages/default.aspx

Graves County is a county located on the southwest border of the U.S. Commonwealth of Kentucky. As of the 2020 census, the population was 36,649. Its county seat is Mayfield. The county was formed in 1824 and was named for Major Benjamin Franklin Graves, a politician and fallen soldier in the War of 1812.

Graves County comprises the Mayfield, KY Micropolitan Statistical Area, which is included in the Paducah-Mayfield, KY-IL Combined Statistical Area.

Graves County is a "limited" dry county, meaning that sale of alcohol in the county is prohibited except for wine and beer in restaurants. In 2016, county residents voted on whether to become a "wet" county, but that attempt failed. Later in the year, a ballot measure was proposed and passed within the city limits of Mayfield (the county seat) to allow alcohol sales in stores and gas stations.

== History ==
Graves County was named for Capt. Benjamin Franklin Graves, who was one of numerous Kentucky officers killed after being taken as a prisoner in the disastrous 1813 Battle of Raisin River in Michigan Territory during the War of 1812. He disappeared while being forced by the Potawatomi, allies of the British, to walk to the British Fort Malden in Amherstburg, Ontario. The Native Americans killed prisoners who could not keep up. Nearly 400 Kentuckians died in the January 22 battle, the highest fatality of any single battle during the war.

The fertile land attracted early settlers from Virginia, North Carolina, South Carolina and Tennessee, who brought with them education, culture, and a fierce determination to succeed. They put down roots and created a unique political, economic, and social environment. Tobacco was important. Graves County developed the dark-fired and dark-air-cured leaf tobacco used in smokeless tobacco farming. In the early 20th of the counties involved in the Black Patch Tobacco Wars, as white farmers organized into the area to suppress violence, after tobacco warehouses and other properties, including tons of tobacco, were being destroyed.

A woolen mill began operating before the Civil War and continued to expand with the men's clothing market. Several clothing manufacturing companies were added in the area. The county seat's minor league baseball team was named the Mayfield Clothiers for this historical connection.

During the post-Reconstruction period, racial violence by whites against blacks continued in Graves County; they exercised terrorism to re-establish and maintain white supremacy. Whites lynched 6 African Americans here after 1877; most were killed around the turn of the 20th century. Four were killed during one week in 1896 in Mayfield, the county seat. Three were killed on December 23 in the so-called Mayfield Race War. Whites had heard rumors that blacks were arming elsewhere in the county in retaliation for the lynching of Jim Stone earlier that week. The whites recruited reinforcements from Fulton County and, overly tense, killed Will Suett, a young black man, as he was getting off a train to visit his family for the holidays. Two other black men were fatally shot soon after. Acknowledging that Suett's death was unprovoked, white residents took up a collection for his widowed mother.

Like many other counties in Kentucky, Graves retained prohibition of the sale or consumption of alcohol, voting to be a "dry" county after Congress repealed Prohibition in the 20th century. Graves County was a "limited" dry county, meaning that sale of alcohol in the county is prohibited except for wine and beer in restaurants. In 2016, the county voted on whether to become a "wet" county but that attempt failed. Later in the year, a ballot measure was proposed and passed within the city limits of Mayfield (the county seat) to allow alcohol sales in stores and gas stations.

Graves County made national news in September 2011 for jailing several Amish men who refused to use orange safety triangles on their buggies for religious reasons. The Old Order Swartzentruber Amish used reflective tape instead. They said it was against their religion to use "loud colors" (as they characterized the orange triangles). They did not succeed in their appeal of their 2008 convictions. Menno Zook, Danny Byler, Mose Yoder, Levi Hostetler, David Zook, and Eli Zook refused to pay the small fines imposed with their convictions. All served sentences ranging from three to 10 days. Jail officials accommodated them by not forcing them to wear the typical orange county jail uniforms; they allowed the Amish to wear dark gray uniforms.

Among notable county natives have been a US vice president, four US Congressmen, heroes, singers and songwriters, and noted writers. The county has numerous historic sites.

On December 10, 2021, the 2021 Western Kentucky tornado moved through the county, causing significant damage, and widespread devastation in Mayfield.

== Geography ==
According to the United States Census Bureau, the county has a total area of 557 square miles (1,440 km^{2}), of which 552 square miles (1,430 km^{2}) is land and 5.0 square miles (13 km^{2}) (0.9%) is water.

=== Adjacent counties ===
- McCracken County (north)
- Marshall County (northeast)
- Calloway County (southeast)
- Henry County, Tennessee (southeast)
- Weakley County, Tennessee (south)
- Hickman County (southwest)
- Carlisle County (northwest)

=== National protected area ===
- Clarks River National Wildlife Refuge (part)

== Demographics ==
Historical population
Census	Pop.	Note	%±
1830	2,504		—
1840	7,465		198.1%
1850	11,397		52.7%
1860	16,233		42.4%
1870	19,398		19.5%
1880	24,138		24.4%
1890	28,534		18.2%
1900	33,204		16.4%
1910	33,539		1.0%
1920	32,483		−3.1%
1930	30,778		−5.2%
1940	31,763		3.2%
1950	31,364		−1.3%
1960	30,021		−4.3%
1970	30,939		3.1%
1980	34,049		10.1%
1990	33,550		−1.5%
2000	37,028		10.4%
2010	37,121		0.3%
2020	36,649		−1.3%
2025 (est.)	37,050	▲	1.1%
U.S. Decennial Census; 1790-1960 1900-1990; 1990-2000 2010-2020

=== 2020 census ===
As of the 2020 census, the county had a population of 36,649. The median age was 40.6 years. 24.2% of residents were under the age of 18 and 19.3% of residents were 65 years of age or older. For every 100 females there were 96.2 males, and for every 100 females age 18 and over there were 93.7 males age 18 and over.

The racial makeup of the county was 85.0% White, 4.3% Black or African American, 0.3% American Indian and Alaska Native, 0.5% Asian, 0.0% Native Hawaiian and Pacific Islander, 3.9% from some other race, and 6.0% from two or more races. Hispanic or Latino residents of any race comprised 7.6% of the population.

33.4% of residents lived in urban areas, while 66.6% lived in rural areas.

There were 14,742 households in the county, of which 31.2% had children under the age of 18 living with them and 26.2% had a female householder with no spouse or partner present. About 27.8% of all households were made up of individuals and 13.8% had someone living alone who was 65 years of age or older.

There were 16,472 housing units, of which 10.5% were vacant. Among occupied housing units, 71.9% were owner-occupied and 28.1% were renter-occupied. The homeowner vacancy rate was 1.6% and the rental vacancy rate was 7.5%.

=== 2000 census ===
As of the census of 2000, there were 37,028 people, 14,841 households, and 10,566 families residing in the county. The population density was 67 per square mile (26/km^{2}). There were 16,340 housing units at an average density of 29 per square mile (11/km^{2}). The racial makeup of the county was 92.73% White, 4.44% Black or African American, 0.20% Native American, 0.20% Asian, 0.01% Pacific Islander, 1.30% from other races, and 1.11% from two or more races. 2.40% of the population were Hispanic or Latino of any race.

There were 14,841 households, out of which 31.50% had children under the age of 18 living with them, 57.90% were married couples living together, 10.00% had a female householder with no husband present, and 28.80% were non-families. 26.20% of all households were made up of individuals, and 12.70% had someone living alone who was 65 years of age or older. The average household size was 2.44 and the average family size was 2.92.

In the county, the population was spread out, with 24.50% under the age of 18, 8.30% from 18 to 24, 27.30% from 25 to 44, 23.80% from 45 to 64, and 16.10% who were 65 years of age or older. The median age was 38 years. For every 100 females there were 95.00 males. For every 100 females age 18 and over, there were 91.50 males.

The median income for a household in the county was $30,874, and the median income for a family was $38,054. Males had a median income of $32,016 versus $20,177 for females. The per capita income for the county was $16,834. About 13.10% of families and 16.40% of the population were below the poverty line, including 21.70% of those under age 18 and 14.10% of those age 65 or over.

== Politics ==
United States presidential election results for Graves County, Kentucky
Year	Republican		Democratic		Third party(ies)	
Year	No.	%	No.	%	No.	%
1912	862	15.24%	3,838	67.85%	957	16.92%
1916	1,930	26.53%	5,197	71.44%	148	2.03%
1920	3,241	25.93%	9,018	72.14%	241	1.93%
1924	2,279	23.22%	7,266	74.04%	268	2.73%
1928	3,223	33.98%	6,237	65.76%	24	0.25%
1932	1,825	15.51%	9,888	84.05%	51	0.43%
1936	1,692	15.29%	9,231	83.43%	142	1.28%
1940	2,122	17.78%	9,786	81.99%	27	0.23%
1944	2,172	21.22%	8,057	78.70%	9	0.09%
1948	1,442	13.83%	8,682	83.26%	304	2.92%
1952	2,925	23.34%	9,592	76.55%	13	0.10%
1956	3,711	26.86%	10,090	73.04%	14	0.10%
1960	4,854	38.70%	7,689	61.30%	0	0.00%
1964	2,389	19.28%	9,958	80.37%	43	0.35%
1968	3,239	26.52%	5,103	41.78%	3,871	31.70%
1972	6,098	60.38%	3,701	36.64%	301	2.98%
1976	3,195	25.72%	8,982	72.32%	243	1.96%
1980	6,556	47.45%	6,999	50.66%	261	1.89%
1984	7,287	51.43%	6,759	47.70%	124	0.88%
1988	6,274	46.32%	7,153	52.81%	118	0.87%
1992	5,311	34.62%	8,001	52.15%	2,029	13.23%
1996	5,130	37.17%	6,991	50.65%	1,682	12.19%
2000	7,849	55.15%	6,097	42.84%	285	2.00%
2004	9,903	61.02%	6,206	38.24%	120	0.74%
2008	10,056	62.25%	5,843	36.17%	256	1.58%
2012	10,699	69.01%	4,547	29.33%	257	1.66%
2016	12,671	76.30%	3,308	19.92%	627	3.78%
2020	13,206	77.60%	3,560	20.92%	253	1.49%
2024	13,378	80.21%	3,105	18.62%	195	1.17%

=== Elected officials ===
Elected officials as of January 3, 2025
U.S. House	James Comer (R)	KY 1
Ky. Senate	Jason Howell (R)	1
Ky. House	Kim Holloway (R)	2

== Communities ==
=== Cities ===
- Mayfield (county seat)
- Wingo

=== Census-designated places ===
- Fancy Farm
- Farmington
- Hickory
- Lowes
- Pryorsburg
- Sedalia
- Symsonia
- Water Valley

=== Other unincorporated communities ===
- Bell City
- Boaz
- Boydsville (partial)
- Clear Springs
- Cuba
- Dogwood
- Dublin
- Dukedom (partial)
- Fairbanks
- Feliciana
- Folsomdale
- Golo
- Kaler
- Kansas
- Lynnville
- Melber (partly in McCracken County)
- Natchez Trace
- Pilot Oak
- Pottsville
- Poduck
- South Highland
- Stubblefield
- Tri City
- Viola
- West Viola
- Westplains
- Wheel

== Notable people ==
- Lucien Anderson, U.S. Representative
- Alben W. Barkley, U.S. Representative, Senator, and Vice President
- Lon Carter Barton, historian, state representative
- Andrew Boone, U.S. Representative
- Herschel Green, World War II flying ace in the United States Army Air Forces
- Noble Jones Gregory, U.S. Representative
- William Voris Gregory, U.S. Representative
- Carroll Hubbard, U.S. Representative
- John Paul Hogan
- Bobbie Ann Mason, author
- Kevin Skinner, country singer and reality show winner
- Adrian Smith, former NBA player
- Jimmy Work, songwriter

== See also ==
- Dry counties
- National Register of Historic Places listings in Graves County, Kentucky
