= Pottstown =

Pottstown may refer to:

- Pottstown, an unincorporated area in Peoria County, Illinois, United States
- Pottstown, Pennsylvania, United States

== See also ==
- Pottsville (disambiguation)
