= West Viola, Kentucky =

Unincorporated community in Kentucky, United States

- Unincorporated community
- Location within Kentucky Location within the United States
- Coordinates: 36°51′19″N 88°39′46″W
- Country: United States
- State: Kentucky
- County: Graves
- Elevation: 449 ft (137 m)
- Time zone: UTC-6 (Central (CST))
  - Summer (DST): UTC-5 (CDT)
- ZIP Code: 42051
- GNIS feature ID: 506482

West Viola is an unincorporated community in Graves County, Kentucky, United States.
