= Kansas, Kentucky =

Unincorporated community in Kentucky, United States

Coordinates: 36°54′06″N 88°43′42″W

Kansas is an unincorporated community in Graves County, in the U.S. state of Kentucky.

== History ==
A post office called Kansas was established in 1854, and remained in operation until 1910. The community was named after the Kansas Territory.
