= Dukedom, Kentucky and Tennessee =

Unincorporated community in Kentucky, United States

Dukedom
- Unincorporated community
- Location within Kentucky Location within the United States
- Coordinates: 36°29′57″N 88°42′54″W
- Country: United States
- State: Kentucky and Tennessee
- Counties: Graves (Kentucky) and Weakley (Tennessee)

Area
  - Total: 1.87 sq mi (4.84 km^{2})
  - Land: 1.86 sq mi (4.83 km^{2})
  - Water: 0.0039 sq mi (0.01 km^{2})
- Elevation: 489 ft (149 m)

Population (2020)
  - Total: 103
  - Density: 55.2/sq mi (21.32/km^{2})
- Time zone: UTC-6 (Central (CST))
  - Summer (DST): UTC-5 (CDT)
- ZIP Code: 38226
- GNIS feature ID: 1283116

Dukedom is an unincorporated community in both Graves County, Kentucky and Weakley County, Tennessee, straddling the state line in the western part of both states. Its location is 36°30′8″N 88°42′54″W, at 487 feet above mean sea level. The community is notable as the location of the Knob Creek Church of Christ, established in June 1834, the first Restoration Movement congregation to adopt the name Church of Christ.

== Demographics ==
Historical population
Census	Pop.	Note	%±
2020	103		—
U.S. Decennial Census

== History ==
A post office was established on the Tennessee side in 1833. The community probably derives its name from Duke A. Beadles, first postmaster.

=== American Civil War ===
Dukedom is connected with General Nathan Bedford Forrest, who served for the Confederacy in the Civil War. A Kentucky highway historical marker in the community reads:

CSA Gen. N. B. Forrest with main body of cavalry passed this way before and after destructive raid on Paducah, March 25, 1864. Returning, Kentucky regiments, camping near here, given leave to seek food, horses, get recruits, visit families. Not one deserted. News item led Forrest to send men back through here again, April 14, to capture horses missed before.

== Notable residents ==
- Jimmy Work, country musician
