= Boaz, Kentucky =

Unincorporated community in Kentucky, United States

- Unincorporated community
- Location within Kentucky Location within the United States
- Coordinates: 36°53′08″N 88°38′04″W
- Country: United States
- State: Kentucky
- County: Graves
- Elevation 67: 220 ft (67 m)
- Time zone: UTC-6 (Central (CST))
  - Summer (DST): UTC-5 (CDT)
- GNIS feature ID: 487591

Boaz is an unincorporated community in Graves County, Kentucky, United States.

== Geography ==
Boaz, KY is located in the northern part of Graves County, Kentucky in the Jackson Purchase Region. The zip code for the city is 42027 and it covers only one city in one county with 552 square miles of land area and 5 square miles of water. The area code of the city is 270. Other towns near Boaz include Folsomdale, Hickory, Lowes, Melber and Lone Oak. There are a total of 65 cities within a 30 miles range of Boaz.

== Demographics ==
The current population of Boaz is approximately 20 people with a total of 10 households. The average household contains two to three people with only 35% of households containing children. The median age of residents in the area is approximately 42 years old. The median income of residents is $44,329 with majority being blue-collar workers.

== Education ==
Schools in the Boaz area are limited with Lowes Elementary and Symsonia Elementary being in the closest proximity and Graves County Middle School and Graves County High School being the main schools for the district. Over 53% of Boaz natives have at least some college or more.
