= Jimmy Work =

American country musician and songwriter (1924–2018)

- Born: March 29, 1924; Akron, Ohio, U.S.
- Died: December 22, 2018 (aged 94); Dukedom, Tennessee, U.S.
- Genres: Country rockabilly
- Occupation(s): Singer, songwriter, millwright
- Instrument(s): Vocals, guitar, fiddle

Jimmy Work (March 29, 1924 – December 22, 2018) was an American country musician and songwriter best known for the country standard "Making Believe". Work was born in Akron, Ohio, but moved to Dukedom, Tennessee, with his family at age two. He picked up guitar at age seven, and learned fiddle and songwriting by his early teens.

By 1945, he had begun playing professionally in Pontiac, Michigan, where many Southerners had moved to take jobs in the automotive industry. He appeared on local radio and published a songbook late in the decade, in addition to recording two singles for the Trophy Records label. His third single was "Tennessee Border" for Alben Records; his version was not a hit, but the following year, the song became a hit for Red Foley, Bob Atcher, Jimmie Skinner, and Tennessee Ernie Ford. Hank Williams also recorded the tune, but did not chart with it.

Work then signed with Decca Records in 1949 and that same year appeared for the first time on the Grand Ole Opry and Ernest Tubb's Midnight Jamboree. He recorded for Decca with members of Red Foley's band, but none of his Decca recordings was a hit, and the label dropped him in 1950. Subsequently, he recorded for Bullet, London, and Capitol, the last of which released him in 1953. Signing soon after with Dot Records, he finally found chart success in 1955 with the songs "Making Believe" (somewhat overshadowed by Kitty Wells cover) and "That's What Makes the Jukebox Play". He played a few concerts with Elvis Presley that year.

Later in the 1950s, his fortunes in music declined, and he began working in real estate. He cut a few singles in 1959 for All Records and continued to write songs, working for Acuff-Rose.

Bear Family Records began reissuing Work's recordings in 1986.

He returned to Dukedom in the 1980s to retire from music. He worked as a millwright at the Goodyear plant in Union City, Tennessee, for several years before fully retiring.

Work died on December 22, 2018, at the age of 94. He lived in Dukedom with his wife.
