= Benjamin Franklin Graves (soldier) =

American politician and military leader

Benjamin Franklin Graves (1771–1813) was a politician and military leader in early 19th-century Kentucky. During the War of 1812, Graves served as a major in the 2nd Battalion, 5th Kentucky Volunteer regiment. On January 22, 1813, he commanded the men of his battalion at the Battle of Frenchtown in what is now Monroe, Michigan. The engagement was part of the unsuccessful effort by the Americans to retake Detroit following its capture by the British in August 1812. The battle resulted in the highest number of American casualties during the war with close to 400 killed and over 500 taken prisoner. When the British withdrew after the battle, a number of severely wounded prisoners including Graves were left behind under the care of two American doctors and a few volunteer attendants. The following morning some of the prisoners were murdered by a group of Indigenous warriors while the rest were taken away to be ransomed or adopted. Graves was among the captives but his ultimate fate is unknown.

The Battle of Frenchtown, also known as the Battle of the River Raisin, or the River Raisin Massacre, is commemorated in Kentucky since many members of the state's elite were lost in the engagement. Graves is included among the officers memorialized on the Military Monument to All Wars at the state capital of Frankfort. In 1824, Graves County in Kentucky was named in his honor.

== Personal life and politics ==
Graves was born in Spotsylvania County, Virginia in 1771, the son of Joseph Graves and Frances Coleman. In 1791, eight years after the American Revolutionary War ended, he moved to Kentucky with his widowed mother and siblings. They settled in Fayette County, where in 1801 and again in 1804, Graves was elected to represent the county in the Kentucky General Assembly. Fayette County was located in the central Bluegrass region, one of the first areas of the state to be settled by Europeans. Graves married Polly Dudley, daughter of Ambrose Dudley and Ann Parker. Together they had six children.

== Military career and disappearance ==
During the War of 1812, Graves served under Lieutenant Colonel William Lewis as a major in the 2nd Battalion, 5th Kentucky Volunteer regiment. His commission was dated August 7, 1812. In the fall of 1812, Lewis's regiment was part of the column led by Brigadier General James Winchester that was sent from Fort Wayne to the Maumee Rapids (present-day Perrysburg, Ohio) in preparation for a winter campaign to retake Detroit from the British and advance into Upper Canada. On January 18, 1813, at the first Battle of Frenchtown, Graves commanded the left wing when Lewis forced a detachment of British militia and Indigenous warriors to retreat from their position on the River Raisin roughly 35 miles (56 km) southwest of Detroit. Winchester subsequently advanced from the rapids with reinforcements.

On January 22, 1813, roughly 600 British regulars and militia led by Colonel Henry Procter and supported by 600 Indigenous warriors attacked Winchester's forces encamped at Frenchtown. During the ensuing melee Graves was shot in the knee. He bandaged his wound himself and told his men, "Never mind me, but fight on!"

After the death of Allen, and with Lewis and Winchester taken prisoner, Major George Madison took command of the Americans still fighting. During a lull in the battle, Procter sent an American officer under a flag of truce to the American lines with a note from Winchester ordering Madison to surrender. Since Winchester was a prisoner, Madison considered the order invalid, however, he agreed to a ceasefire and opened discussions with the British. Madison surrendered once he had received assurances from Procter that his men would be protected from the Indigenous warriors.

The battle had been costly. 397 Americans were later reported as killed or missing, the highest number of fatalities in any single battle of the war. Over 500 including Graves had been taken prisoner. Among the dead were Graves's younger brother, Thomas Coleman Graves, a Lieutenant in the 17th Infantry.

Shortly after the surrender, Procter received a credible but false report that American reinforcements were less than 8 miles (13 km) away. He ordered an immediate retreat but due to a shortage of sleighs, was forced to leave severely wounded prisoners behind including Graves. The exact number of wounded prisoners is not known, with contemporary accounts reporting as few as 48 or as many as 80. The wounded were quartered in two of the village's homes. Tending the wounded were American surgeon Doctor John Todd, surgeon's mate Gustavus Bower, and a number of able-bodied volunteers. The only British personnel with the prisoners were two officers from the Essex militia and three interpreters from the Indian Department, all of whom left the village before dawn.

According to one eyewitness account written many years later, Captain William Elliott of the Essex militia asked to borrow Graves' horse, saddle and bridle. Elliott promised that he would send back sleighs for the wounded but help never came.

On the morning of January 23, 100 to 200 Indigenous warriors returned to Frenchtown. They entered the makeshift hospitals and robbed the wounded of their clothing and blankets. They killed those unable to walk, forced the remainder outside, and burned the two buildings. The survivors were taken away but those who struggled to keep up with their captors were killed. Most were brought to Amherstburg or Detroit and ransomed. Others escaped or were ransomed weeks or even months later. A few may have been tortured to death while some of the younger prisoners were adopted into Indigenous families and never returned.

Graves was taken captive by the Potawatomi. He was reported to have been seen at the River Rouge near Detroit on January 25 or 26. Three months after the battle, another captive, Timothy Mallory, escaped and brought back word that Graves was still alive, however, his ultimate fate is not known. In his biography of Graves's grandson, William Roscoe Thayer wrote that "for many years after his disappearance, his widow kept a light burning at a window of their home, to greet him in case of his return."

In his report to the Secretary of War dated February 11, 1813, Winchester praised Graves and his fellow officers, saying "they defended themselves to the last with great gallantry."

== Memorials ==
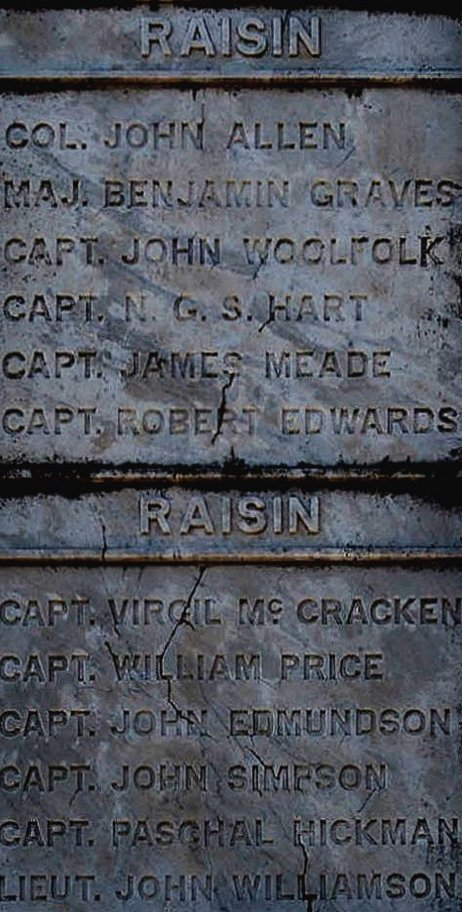
Names of American officers who died at the Battle of Frenchtown inscribed on the Military Monument to All Wars in Frankfort, Kentucky.

The Battle of Frenchtown, also known as the Battle of the River Raisin or the Raisin River Massacre, is commemorated in Kentucky as well as in Michigan. Graves' name is inscribed, along with the names of other officers who fell at the River Raisin, on Kentucky's Military Monument to All Wars, located in the Frankfort Cemetery in the state capital, Frankfort. In 1823, Graves County, Kentucky was created and named in Graves's honor. In 2009, the River Raisin National Battlefield Park was established in Munroe, Michigan on the site of the battle. It the only National Battlefield Park to commemorate a battle of the War of 1812.
