= Lon Carter Barton =

American politician and historian

Member of the Kentucky House of Representatives
- In office January 1, 1958 – January 1, 1966
- Preceded by: Howard V. Reid
- Succeeded by: Lloyd E. Clapp
- Constituency: 3rd district (1958–1964); 2nd district (1964–1966)

Personal details
- Party: Democratic

Lon Carter Barton (1925–2006) was an American politician and historian. He was a Democratic member of the Kentucky House of Representatives. He was particularly interested in the Civil War history of the Jackson Purchase portion of Kentucky, located in the far western part of the state, the Civil War as fought locally, and the Kitty League (Class D Minor League) Baseball.

Barton was a U.S. Army veteran of the Korean War, and represented Graves County in the Kentucky House of Representatives as a Democrat from the 3rd District (1958–1963) and 2nd District (1964–1965). He later became a history and journalism teacher at Mayfield High School, where he served as both the newspaper and yearbook advisor. He was the unofficial Graves County historian and authored articles in The Kentucky Encyclopedia about the area, as well as the former professional baseball team, the Mayfield Clothiers. The team was one of three from Mayfield that played in the Kitty League throughout Kentucky, Illinois, and Tennessee. The league's name came from letters of the three states.

Barton's family ran a downtown men's clothing store and were among the initial investors of the first modern shopping centers in Mayfield.

He died at his 150-year-old family home in Mayfield on March 28, 2006, aged 80.

His home was later auctioned for a sale price of $25,000 the home is great need of repairs came with a contingency that it could not be torn down or dismantled for 5 years from the date of sale. The house was placed back on the market when the purchaser decided the cost of repairs were too great. The home originally sat near the town square and it was moved sometime in the early 1900s the large logs used to move the home remain under the house to this day.

Lon Carter Barton began his teaching career at Mayfield High School in 1950.
