= Nebraska Legislature 19th district =

American legislative district

Nebraska's 19th legislative district
- Map of Nebraska Legislature districts with the 19th district shaded in red
Senator
Rob Dover; R–Norfolk
since 2022
- Demographics: 82.7% White; 1% Black; 14.1% Hispanic; 1.1% Asian; 1.3% Native American
- Population (2020): 39,550

The Nebraska Legislature's 19th district is one of 49 legislative districts in the Nebraska Legislature. The district is located in northeastern Nebraska and covers all of Madison County and southern Pierce County. Notable settlements in the area include Norfolk, Battle Creek, Madison and Pierce. Rob Dover has represented the district since 2022.

== Demographics ==
The US Census Bureau recorded the population as of 2020 at 39,550.

- 82.7% of the district is White.
- 14.1% of the district is Hispanic.
- 1.3% of the district is Native American.
- 1.1% of the district is Asian.
- 1% of the district is Black.

== List of senators ==
Senator	Party	Years of service	Legislature	Residence
Rob Dover	Republican	2022 - present	108th-109th	Norfolk
Mike Flood	Republican	2021-2022*	107th	Norfolk
Jim Scheer	Republican	2013-2021	103rd-106th	Norfolk
Mike Flood	Republican	2005-2013*	99th-102nd	Norfolk
Gene Tyson	Republican	1997-2005	95th-98th	Norfolk
Lee Klein	Republican	1995-1997	94th	Battle Creek
Connie Day	Democratic	1993-1995*	93rd-94th	Norfolk
Elroy Hefner	Republican	1976-1993	85th-92nd	Coleridge
Jules Burbach	Democratic	1965-1976*	75th-84th	Hartington

- Mike Flood resigned before his term ended. Rob Dover was appointed to fill the vacancy.
- Mike Flood left the legislature in 2013 due to consecutive term limits, but was allowed to run after Jim Scheer.
- Connie Day resigned before her term ended. Lee Klein was appointed to fill the vacancy.
- Julius W. Burbach resigned before his term ended. Elroy Hefner was appointed to fill the vacancy.
