= 2003 Manchester tornado =

2003 F4 tornado in South Dakota, U.S.

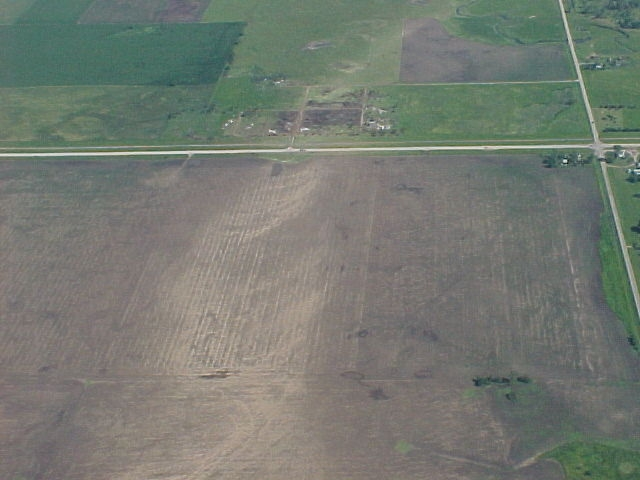
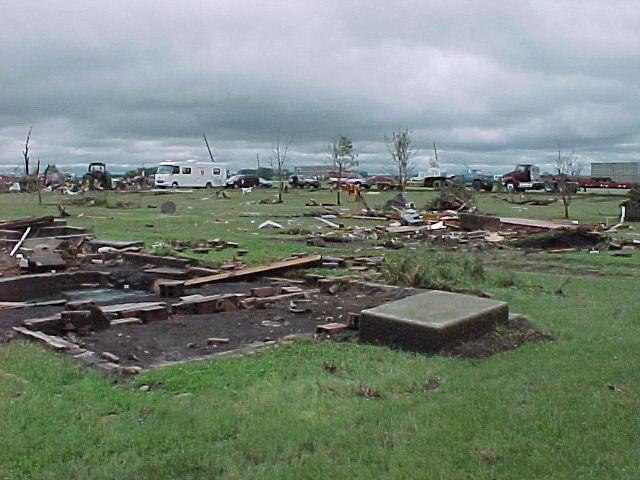
- Clockwise from top: The tornado seen from Turtle Probe 1 near Manchester; Severe damage to multiple homes in Manchester after the tornado; Aerial view of Manchester after the tornado. Cycloidal marks can be seen across the field.

Meteorological history
- Formed: June 24, 2003, 7:29 p.m. CDT (UTC−05:00)
- Dissipated: June 24, 2003, 7:53 p.m. CDT (UTC−05:00)
- Duration: 24 minutes

F4 tornado
- on the Fujita scale
- Path length: 25 miles (40 km)
- Highest winds: 207–260 mph (333–418 km/h)

Overall effects
- Fatalities: 0
- Injuries: 4
- Damage: $3 million (2003 USD)
- Areas affected: Kingsbury County (Specifically at Manchester)
- Part of the 2003 South Dakota tornado outbreak and Tornadoes of 2003

In the afternoon hours of June 24, 2003, a large and violent F4 tornado, part of the 2003 South Dakota tornado outbreak, struck the rural South Dakota community of Manchester over Kingsbury County, injuring four. It was one of the most violent tornadoes of the year and also turned Manchester into a ghost town.

The tornado formed over rural Kingsbury County, having a large, "wedge" shape before impacting Manchester, completely obliterating all homes and structures within town. TWISTEX successfully deployed their "turtle probes" into the tornado, recording a 100 millibar pressure drop. Footage of the tornado from storm chasers became popular in social media platforms.

== Meteorological synopsis ==
South Dakota was in the midst of a multiple day tornado outbreak that started in June 21, that had produced a previous F4 rated tornado near Coleridge, Nebraska that killed one on June 23, along with multiple other tornadoes. By the afternoon hours of June 24, a supercell would form over South Dakota, producing a few weak tornadoes, and a large cone-shaped F3 rated tornado that destroyed farms around Woonsocket. After few more weaker rated tornadoes had dissipated, the Manchester tornado would develop south of town.

== Tornado summary ==
The tornado formed at 2329 UTC (18:29 CST) over rural fields in Kingsbury County, moving northeast approaching the small community of Manchester. It would destroy crops, trees, and powerlines, digging cycloidal mark patterns into the field − likely having a multiple-vortex structure. Storm chasers filmed the tornado as it grew into a large "wedge" shape, approaching and eventually engulfing the town.

The tornado moved through Manchester at approximately 7:45 p.m. At one home, two large leaking propane tanks were found in the cellar of a family that had driven out of town to escape the tornado. One was injured in a basement. Another was blown out of a home on their way to the same basement, and another two were injured inside a mobile home that was destroyed. Several outlying buildings along US-14 were also destroyed.

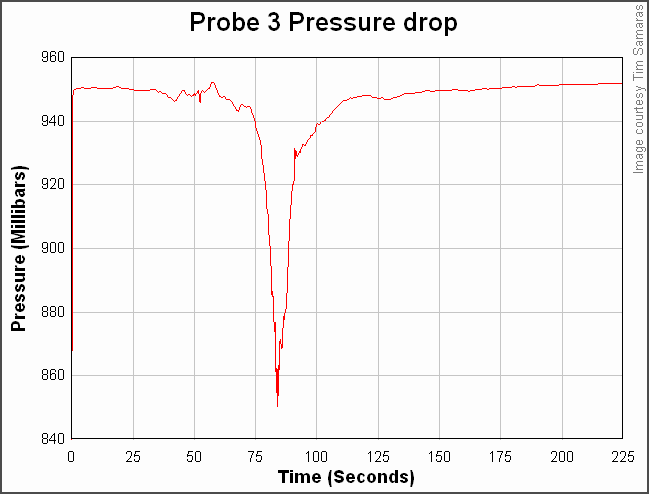
The pressure drop recorded by TWISTEX's probe.

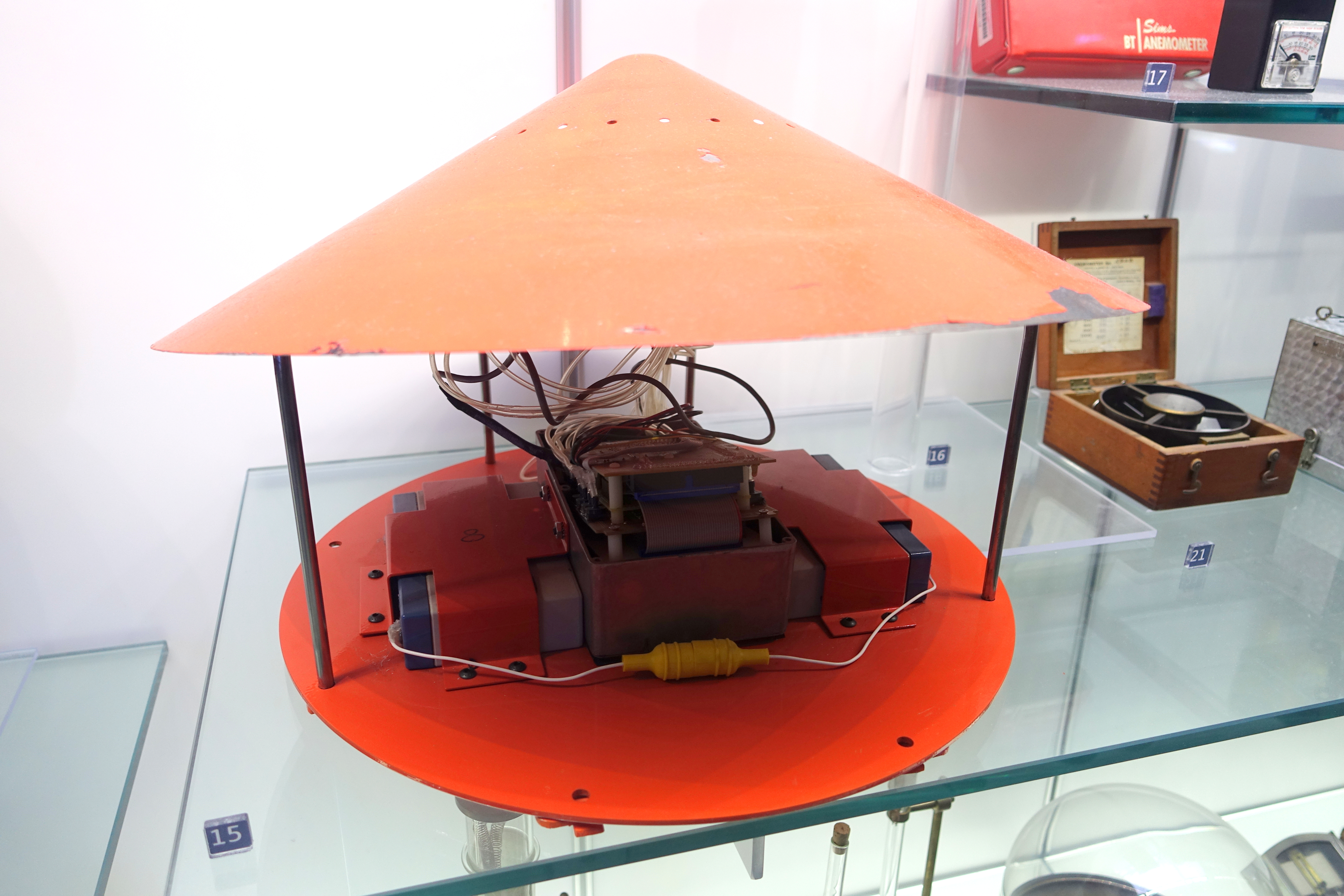
One of the "turtle probes" that was deployed into the tornado.

Tim Samaras and TWISTEX were concurrently viewing the tornado as it destroyed town, aiming to drop one of their "turtle probes" into the path to get data inside the tornado. The team dropped probe 3 at the intersection of 207th and 425th Avenue before escaping north to drop probe 5 and their video probe, before getting out of the tornado's path, with the condensation funnel now beginning to shrink in width. The probes successfully collected data inside the tornado, revealing a record 100 millibar pressure drop. Gravel around the probe was scoured except for gravel that was underneath the probe.

The tornado would later dissipate over rural fields north of Manchester at approximately 18:53 CST, causing no fatalities, but injured four out of six residents of the town. Three had serious injuries and were later sent to a hospital, additionally destroying all structures within Manchester. Farms north of Manchester were also damaged or destroyed. Twelve cattle from one Centennial Farm were killed with others injured. The tornado tracked for an estimated 25 miles (40 kilometers), most of the path was over rural fields in Kingsbury County, occasionally hitting structures outside Manchester.

== Aftermath ==
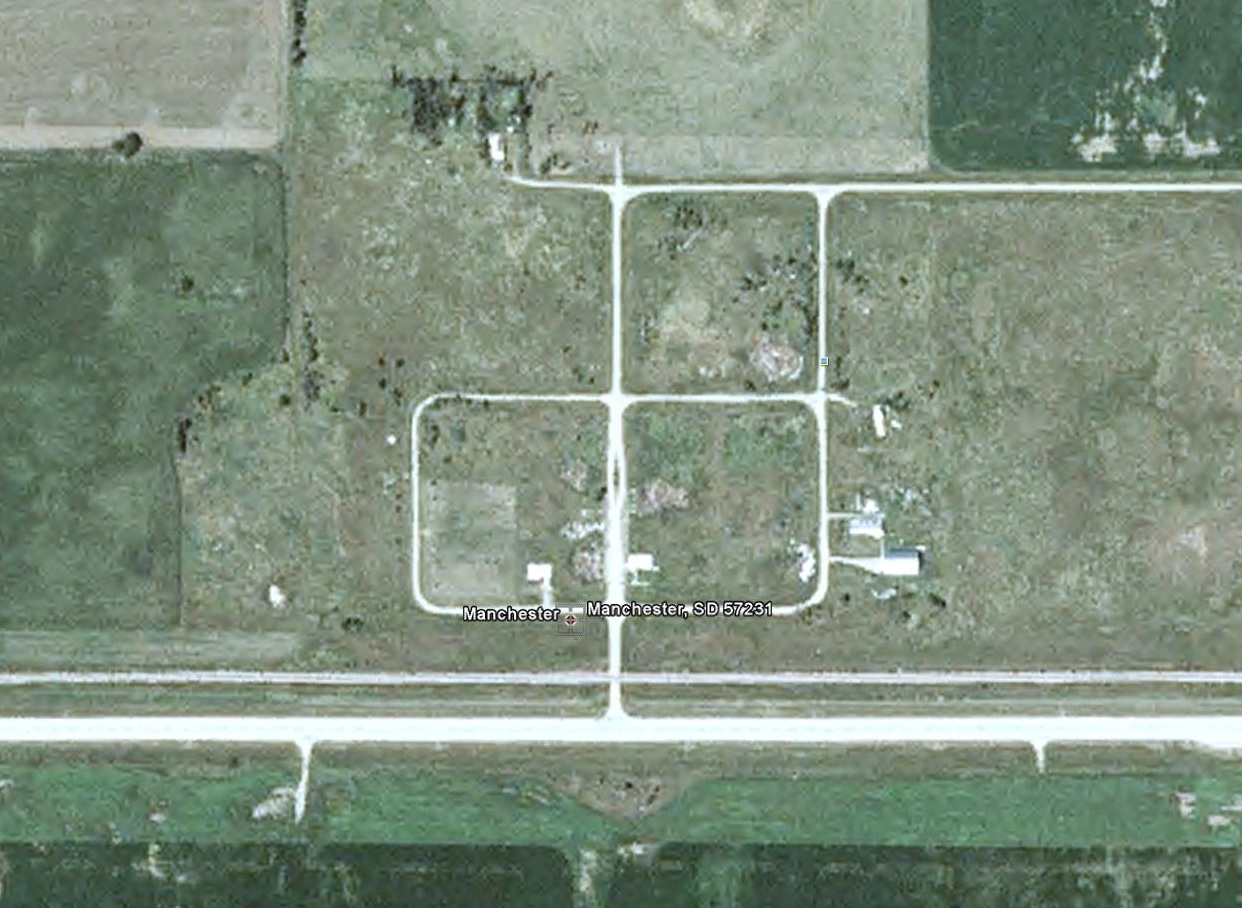
Satellite view of Manchester in 2004 after the tornado.

Every structure within Manchester − including the town's post office − and the surrounding areas was completely swept away or destroyed by the tornado, which was around 1/2 mile wide. Estimated wind speeds were between 207 and 260 mph (333-418 km/h), within the F4 range on the Fujita Scale.

Civilians who were still living in Manchester at the time had to relocate to other towns in South Dakota. Due to the immense destruction caused to the community, in 2004, the state of South Dakota officially disincorporated Manchester. Currently, Manchester is a "Ghost Town", and a memorial was built in place of where the former community was located in 2007.

== See also ==
- List of F4 and EF4 tornadoes (2000–2009)
- 2008 Picher–Neosho tornado − An EF4 tornado that made Picher, Oklahoma into a ghost town.
- 1998 Spencer tornado − Another destructive, but deadly F4 tornado that destroyed much of Spencer, South Dakota.
