= 2003 South Dakota tornado outbreak =

Tornado outbreak in South Dakota, US

Meteorological history
- Duration: June 21–24, 2003

Tornado outbreak
- Tornadoes: 125
- Max. rating: F4 tornado
- Duration: 3 days, 9 hours, 23 minutes

Overall effects
- Casualties: 2 fatalities, 19 injuries
- Damage: $13.5 million
- Areas affected: United States Great Plains
- Part of the tornado outbreaks of 2003

The 2003 South Dakota tornado outbreak, known locally as "Tornado Tuesday", was a tornado outbreak that occurred in the southeastern and east central part of South Dakota in the United States on June 24, 2003. At the time, this outbreak tied a United States record for the most tornado touchdowns in a single day for one state, with 67. The event was part of a larger outbreak that produced 125 tornadoes.

== Confirmed tornadoes ==
Confirmed tornadoes by Fujita rating
FU	F0	F1	F2	F3	F4	F5	Total
0	92	20	9	2	2	0	125

=== June 21 event ===
F#	Location	County	Time (UTC)	Path length	Damage
Wyoming
F0	W of Gillette	Campbell	1850	0.5 miles (0.8 km)	Brief touchdown with no damage.
F0	SE of Wyodak	Campbell	1925	1 miles (1.6 km)	Weak tornado with no damage.
North Dakota
F0	SW of Mercer	McLean	2027	5 miles (8 km)	Weak tornado with no damage.
F0	W of Crystal Springs	Kidder	2244	unknown	Brief touchdown with no damage.
Source: Tornado History Project - June 21, 2003 Storm Data

=== June 22 event ===
F#	Location	County	Time (UTC)	Path length	Damage
Nebraska
F0	E of Ruskin	Thayer	2230	4 miles (6.4 km)	Damage to center pivots and power poles.
F2	Deshler area	Thayer	2243	3 miles (4.8 km)	1 death - Major damage occurred on the south side of town. 400 homes were damaged, including 4 destroyed and 100 others with moderate damage. Six businesses were destroyed and 25 others had extensive damage. 7 other people were injured.
F0	NE of Deshler	Thayer	2300	1 miles (1.6 km)	Weak tornado with no damage.
F0	NW of Aurora	Hamilton	2308	2 miles (3.2 km)	Weak tornado with no damage.
F0	S of Deshler	Thayer	2320	2 miles (3.2 km)	Damage to crops and center pivot systems.
F0	SW of Marquette	Hamilton	2342	0.5 miles (0.8 km)	Brief touchdown with no damage.
F0	NE of Bradshaw	York	0030	0.2 miles (0.32 km)	Brief touchdown with no damage
Minnesota
F1	E of Starbuck	Pope	2350	0.1 miles (0.16 km)	A camper was flipped and trees were knocked down.
Kansas
F0	N of Courtland	Republic	0012	0.5 miles (0.8 km)	Several outbuildings were damaged.
F0	NW of Scandia	Republic	0020	1 miles (1.6 km)	Damage to power poles and power lines.
F1	NE of Courtland	Republic	0030	3 miles (4.8 km)	2 homes were damaged.
F1	SE of Republic	Republic	0058	2 miles (3.2 km)	One home was damaged.
F2	NE of Republic	Republic	0110	4 miles (6.4 km)	One home was destroyed.
F0	NW of Munden	Republic	0217	0.5 miles (0.8 km)	A sheriff's car was blown into a ditch.
F0	E of Woodruff	Phillips	0507	0.2 miles (0.32 km)	Brief touchdown with no damage.
F0	SW of Reamsville	Smith	0545	0.2 miles (0.32 km)	Brief touchdown with no damage.
F0	NW of Reamsville	Smith	0550	0.2 miles (0.32 km)	Brief touchdown with no damage.
Source: Tornado History Project - June 22, 2003 Storm Data

=== June 23 event ===
F#	Location	County	Time (UTC)	Path length	Damage
North Dakota
F1	S of Cogswell	Sargent	2045	2.5 miles (4 km)	Damage mostly to crops.
F0	S of Brampton	Sargent	2102	3 miles (4.8 km)	Weak tornado with no damage.
F0	SW of Forman	Sargent	2108	1 miles (1.6 km)	Weak tornado with no damage
F0	SE of Stirum	Sargent	2115	2 miles (3.2 km)	Weak tornado with no damage.
South Dakota
F0	S of Ortley	Grant	2350	0.1 miles (0.16 km)	Brief touchdown with no damage.
Nebraska
F0	N of Royal	Antelope	0100	unknown	Brief touchdown with no damage.
F4	Coleridge area	Cedar	0143	13 miles (20.8 km)	1 death - Tornado touched down about 6 miles southwest of Coleridge. The tornado moved northeast and crossed the northern sections of the city uprooting trees, downing power lines, and destroying a couple of grain bins. A construction business in a garage was also destroyed. The tornado then continued northeast of town, hitting a large hog farm. At this farm, a 70-year-old man was killed while in a storage shed when a tractor that was flipped by the winds crushed him. Many livestock were also killed by debris or flung through the air. In one case cattle were carried over a mile then left dead in a pile. The tornado then widened to around 3/4 of a mile, reaching its maximum intensity. Numerous vehicles were tossed at this location and a farmstead was completely flattened. Trees were also stripped and debarked. The tornado remained around 3/4 of a mile wide for a few more miles before turning slightly to the southeast and diminishing, but not before hitting 2 more farmsteads and moving one house off of its foundation. In total, 11 homes received substantial damage and between 100 and 200 utility poles were downed.
F0	N of McCook	Frontier	0221	0.1 miles (0.16 km)	Damage to power poles.
Iowa
F0	W of Correctionville	Woodbury	0251	0.1 miles (0.16 km)	Brief touchdown with no damage.
Source: Tornado History Project - June 23, 2003 Storm Data

=== June 24 event ===
F#	Location	County	Time (UTC)	Path length	Damage
Wyoming
F0	NW of Baggs	Sweetwater	1830	unknown	Brief touchdown with no damage.
South Dakota
F0	E of Mount Vernon	Davison	2115	0.4 miles (0.6 km)	Brief touchdown with no damage.
F2	N of Mount Vernon	Davison	2117	6 miles (9.6 km)	A barn, a granary, and a machine shed were destroyed. One home, crops, trees and several farm buildings were damaged. Tornado left cycloidal marks in farm fields.
F0	Vermillion area	Clay	2158	0.2 miles (0.32 km)	Brief touchdown with no damage.
F0	NE of Centerville (1st tornado)	Lincoln	2217	1 miles (1.6 km)	Brief touchdown with no damage.
F0	W of Forestburg	Sanborn	2219	0.1 miles (0.16 km)	Brief touchdown with no damage.
F3	W of Woonsocket	Jerauld, Sanborn	2223	6 miles (9.6 km)	Large cone-shaped tornado destroyed or severely damaged several buildings on two farms. The tornado lifted the roof off a house. Another farmhouse had windows blown out, and shingles and aluminum siding torn off. Destroyed buildings included a barn, garage, outbuildings, and other small structures. Vehicles inside the destroyed garage were damaged. The tornado also caused tree, power line, and crop damage. Tornado left cycloidal marks in farm fields.
F0	N of Harrisburg	Lincoln	2230	0.1 miles (0.16 km)	Brief touchdown with no damage.
F0	N of Vermillion	Clay	2242	0.1 miles (0.16 km)	Brief touchdown with no damage.
F0	SW of Midway	Clay	2242	0.5 miles (0.8 km)	Brief touchdown with no damage.
F0	NE of Woonsocket	Sanborn	2245	0.5 miles (0.8 km)	Brief touchdown with no damage.
F0	W of Carthage	Sanborn	2255	0.1 miles (0.16 km)	Brief touchdown with no damage.
F0	SE of Huron (1st tornado)	Beadle	2300	0.2 miles (0.32 km)	Brief touchdown with no damage.
F0	SE of Huron (2nd tornado)	Beadle	2300	0.2 miles (0.32 km)	Brief touchdown with no damage.
F0	NW of Esmond	Beadle	2316	0.1 miles (0.16 km)	Brief touchdown with no damage.
F0	N of Esmond	Kingsbury	2327	0.4 miles (0.6 km)	Brief touchdown with no damage.
F4	Manchester	Kingsbury	2329	10 miles (16 km)	See article on this tornado – Four people were injured. Manchester was never rebuilt and is now a "ghost town".
F0	NW of Hub City	Clay	2330	0.7 miles (1.1 km)	Brief touchdown with no damage.
F0	NE of Wakonda (1st tornado)	Clay	2330	1 miles (1.6 km)	Brief touchdown with no damage.
F1	NE of Wakonda (2nd tornado)	Clay	2332	1.5 miles (2.4 km)	Buildings at a farm, crops, and trees were damaged.
F0	NE of Wakonda (3rd tornado)	Clay	2332	2 miles (3.2 km)	Trees and crops were damaged.
F0	SW of Centerville	Clay	2333	0.5 miles (0.8 km)	Brief touchdown with no damage.
F0	Centerville area	Turner	2333	1 miles (1.6 km)	Brief touchdown with no damage.
F0	SE of Watertown	Codington	2335	0.5 miles (0.8 km)	Brief touchdown with no damage.
F0	NE of Centerville (2nd tornado)	Lincoln	2338	0.5 miles (0.8 km)	Brief touchdown with no damage.
F0	E of Manchester	Kingsbury	2352	0.1 miles (0.16 km)	Brief touchdown with no damage.
F0	SW of Lake Andes	Charles Mix	2354	0.5 miles (0.8 km)	Brief touchdown with no damage.
F0	NE of Centerville (3rd tornado)	Turner	2355	2 miles (3.2 km)	Weak tornado with no damage.
F2	NE of Manchester	Kingsbury	2358	2.2 miles (3.5 km)	Heavy damage to farm buildings and homes.
F2	E of Viborg	Turner	0000	7 miles (11.2 km)	Farm equipment and buildings, crops, trees, and power lines were damaged.
F1	NE of Lake Andes (1st tornado)	Charles Mix	0003	3 miles (4.8 km)	Several buildings at an abandoned farm were destroyed or damaged.
F1	NW of De Smet	Kingsbury	0005	0.7 miles (1.1 km)	Damage to farm buildings and crops.
F1	NE of Centerville (4th tornado)	Lincoln	0010	2.8 miles (4.5 km)	A machine shed was destroyed while farm equipment, crops, and farm buildings were damaged.
F0	N of Centerville	Turner	0010	3.5 miles (5.6 km)	Brief touchdown with no damage.
F1	NE of Lake Andes (2nd tornado)	Charles Mix	0010	3 miles (4.8 km)	Four grain bins and two sheds were destroyed.
F0	SE of Bancroft (1st tornado)	Kingsbury	0017	0.1 miles (0.16 km)	Brief touchdown with no damage.
F0	SE of Bancroft (2nd tornado)	Kingsbury	0019	0.1 miles (0.16 km)	Brief touchdown with no damage.
F0	Viborg area	Turner	0020	0.7 miles (1.1 km)	Brief touchdown with no damage.
F0	W of Davis	Turner	0020	1 miles (1.6 km)	Brief touchdown with no damage.
F1	W of Erwin	Kingsbury	0020	0.7 miles (1.1 km)	Structures and trees were damaged.
F2	E of Davis	Lincoln, Turner	0020	7.7 miles (12.3 km)	One farm home was destroyed with two others damaged. Crops were also damaged.
F1	SW of Bryant (1st tornado)	Kingsbury, Clark	0028	1.5 miles (2.4 km)	Damage to trees.
F1	NE of Centerville (5th tornado)	Lincoln, Turner	0030	3.5 miles (5.6 km)	A farmhouse was heavily damaged. Other buildings damaged, as well as power lines and crops.
F0	NE of Stephen	Hand	0030	0.1 miles (0.16 km)	Brief touchdown with no damage.
F0	SW of Bryant (2nd tornado)	Kingsbury	0032	0.1 miles (0.16 km)	Brief touchdown with no damage.
F0	S of Bryant	Hamlin	0035	0.1 miles (0.16 km)	Brief touchdown with no damage.
F0	S of Lennox (1st tornado)	Lincoln	0052	0.6 miles (1 km)	Brief touchdown with no damage.
F0	E of Armour	Douglas	0055	0.7 miles (1.1 km)	One barn was damaged.
F0	SW of Tea (1st tornado)	Lincoln	0055	0.8 miles (1.3 km)	Brief touchdown with no damage.
F1	S of Lennox (2nd tornado)	Lincoln	0100	1.3 miles (2.1 km)	Farm structures were damaged.
F0	NE of Armour	Douglas	0105	0.7 miles (1.1 km)	Brief touchdown with no damage.
F0	N of Worthing	Lincoln	0105	2.3 miles (3.7 km)	Weak tornado with no damage.
F0	SE of Tea (1st tornado)	Lincoln	0107	1.5 miles (2.4 km)	Weak tornado with no damage.
F0	SW of Tea (2nd tornado)	Lincoln	0109	1.2 miles (1.9 km)	Weak tornado with no damage.
F0	SE of Tea	Lincoln	0112	0.8 miles (1.3 km)	Brief touchdown with no damage.
F3	Cavour area	Beadle	0125	3.5 miles (5.6 km)	Tornado destroyed farm buildings and numerous trees, resulting in F3 damage southwest of Cavour. Homes and businesses within the town of Cavour were severely damaged at F2 intensity. Winds of 120 mph were measured by an anemometer on top of a grain elevator in Cavour.
F2	Parker area	Turner	0130	1.5 miles (2.4 km)	Tornado heavily damaged or destroyed numerous structures at the county fairgrounds, uprooted numerous trees, and blew down power lines, resulting in power outages which lasted up to a day. The tornado damaged other structures in Parker, including homes and the county courthouse. One home was shifted off its foundation and received broken windows and damaged siding. Some of the damage resulted from falling trees or wind blown debris.
F0	N of Parker	Turner	0140	0.6 miles (1 km)	Brief touchdown with no damage.
F1	SE of Pumpkin Center	Minnehaha	0150	0.6 miles (1 km)	Several homes were damaged. 3 people were injured.
F2	NE of Yale	Beadle	0205	2 miles (3.2 km)	Farm structures were destroyed.
F1	NE of Hartford	Minnehaha	0205	1.7 miles (2.7 km)	At least 20 homes were heavily damaged, some of them were left inhabitable.
F1	SW of Bryant (3rd tornado)	Kingsbury	0213	0.7 miles (1.1 km)	Several farm structures were damaged or destroyed.
F0	SW of Renner	Minnehaha	0234	0.5 miles (0.8 km)	Brief touchdown with no damage.
F0	S of Wentworth	Lake	0240	0.8 miles (1.3 km)	Brief touchdown with no damage.
F1	SW of Viborg	Turner	0240	1.2 miles (1.9 km)	Small farm buildings and two garages were destroyed. Homes, a propane tank, and a barn were damaged.
F0	SE of Davis	Lincoln	0247	0.9 miles (1.4 km)	Brief touchdown with no damage.
F0	W of Egan	Moody	0250	0.8 miles (1.3 km)	Brief touchdown with no damage.
Minnesota
F0	S of Arco	Lincoln	2138	0.1 miles (0.16 km)	Brief touchdown with no damage.
F0	S of Starbuck	Pope	2155	0.1 miles (0.16 km)	Damage limited to trees.
F1	S of Buffalo Lake (1st tornado)	Renville, Sibley	2246	4.5 miles (7.2 km)	A grain bin, a silo, sheds, and outbuildings were destroyed. Trees and homes were damaged and a grain dryer was overturned
F0	W of Stewart	Sibley, Renville	2330	3 miles (4.8 km)	Damage to power lines and transformers.
F2	Buffalo Lake area	Sibley, Renville	2333	5.5 miles (8.8 km)	Multiple-vortex tornado. Outbuildings and sheds were destroyed, and homes were heavily damaged outside Buffalo of Lake. Inside the city, a grain elevator was destroyed while sheds and garages were blown down. A church, homes, and businesses were also damaged. 80 homes were heavily damaged with 29 being inhabitable, and 120 others had minor damage. 5 people were injured.
F0	SE of Willmar (1st tornado)	Kandiyohi	2347	0.1 miles (0.16 km)	Brief touchdown with no damage.
F0	SE of Willmar (2nd tornado)	Kandiyohi	2349	0.2 miles (0.32 km)	Brief touchdown with no damage.
F0	S of Kandiyohi	Kandiyohi	2353	0.2 miles (0.32 km)	Damage to a few trees.
F0	SW of Kandiyohi	Kandiyohi	2358	0.1 miles (0.16 km)	Brief touchdown with no damage.
F1	SE of Kandiyohi	Kandiyohi	0003	3 miles (4.8 km)	Three farmsteads, sheds, outbuildings, and trees were damaged.
F1	S of Buffalo Lake (2nd tornado)	Sibley, Renville	0010	1.5 miles (2.4 km)	Sheds, outbuildings, and grain bins were damaged.
F0	S of Atwater	Kandiyohi, Meeker	0015	0.5 miles (0.8 km)	Damage limited to trees.
F0	SE of Wegdahl	Yellow Medicine, Chippewa	0038	3 miles (4.8 km)	A shed was damaged, and two gravity boxes were pushed into a building.
F0	NE of Churchill	Renville	0039	2.5 miles (4 km)	Damage limited to trees.
F0	NE of Stacy	Chisago	0050	0.3 miles (0.5 km)	One home had minor damage.
Iowa
F0	S of Quick	Pottawatamie	2153	0.3 miles (0.5 km)	Brief touchdown with no damage.
F0	SW of Alvord	Lyon	0312	0.1 miles (0.16 km)	Brief touchdown with no damage.
Nebraska
F0	S of Obert	Cedar	2155	unknown	Brief touchdown with no damage.
F0	S of Maskell	Dixon	2208	0.1 miles (0.16 km)	Brief touchdown with no damage.
F0	NE of Maxwell	Lincoln	2244	0.1 miles (0.16 km)	Brief touchdown with no damage
F0	SW of Arnold	Custer, Lincoln	2300	2.1 miles (3.4 km)	2 center pivot irrigation systems were destroyed
F0	SW of Brady	Lincoln	2310	0.1 miles (0.16 km)	One garage was damaged and shifted from its foundation. One home was damaged, along with trees. A camper was lifted and thrown into a fence .
F0	NE of Rose	Rock	0004	0.1 miles (0.16 km)	Brief touchdown with no damage.
F0	S of Bassett	Rock	0025	0.1 miles (0.16 km)	Damage limited to trees.
F0	NE of Mills	Keya Paha	0048	0.1 miles (0.16 km)	Damage to a mechanics shops, a garage, and a grain bin.
F0	E of Hayes Center	Hayes	0105	0.1 miles (0.16 km)	Brief touchdown with no damage.
F0	N of Taylor	Loup	0230	0.1 miles (0.16 km)	Brief touchdown with no damage.
F0	SW of Newport	Rock	0252	0.1 miles (0.16 km)	Brief touchdown with no damage.
Source: Tornado History Project - June 24, 2003 Storm Data

=== Manchester, South Dakota ===
Manchester, South Dakota
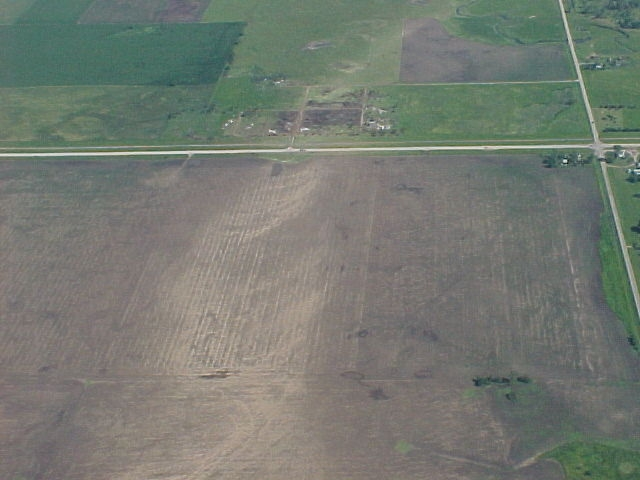
- An aerial photo of Manchester after the tornado

Meteorological history
- Formed: June 24, 2003, 7:29 p.m. CDT (UTC−05:00)
- Dissipated: June 24, 2003, 7:53 p.m. CDT (UTC−05:00)
- Duration: 24 minutes

F4 tornado
- on the Fujita scale
- Highest winds: 260 mph (420 km/h)

Overall effects
- Injuries: 4
- Damage: $3 million (2003 USD)

The most powerful tornado was located around Manchester in Kingsbury County and was rated an F4 on the Fujita scale. In the National Weather Service survey released shortly after the tornado, winds were estimated to be up to 260 miles per hour. There, every single structure was either heavily damaged or destroyed. Trees were debarked and all three homes were swept away. No fatalities were reported with this tornado, but at least 4 people were injured by the storm. Manchester was never rebuilt and is now a "ghost town". Researchers had placed several sensors all across the area that were hit by the tornado. One recorded a record-setting pressure measurement 100 mb below ambient pressure.

== See also ==
- Weather of 2003
- List of North American tornadoes and tornado outbreaks
- List of F4 and EF4 tornadoes
  - List of F4 and EF4 tornadoes (2000–2009)
