= Tornadoes of 2003 =

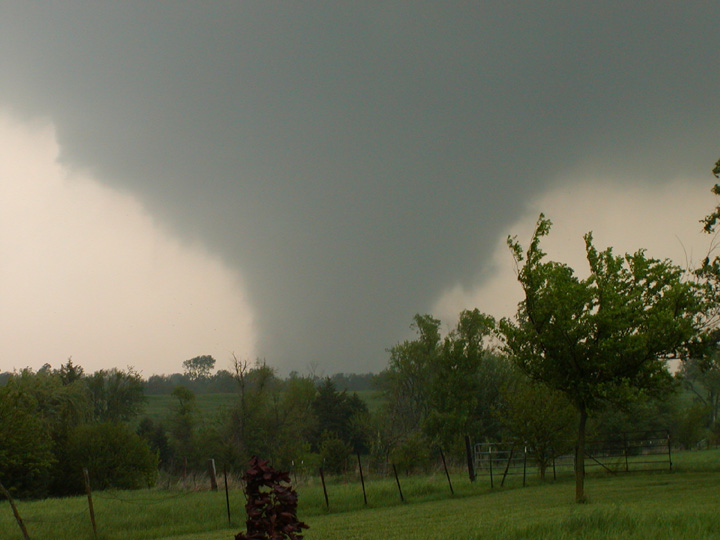
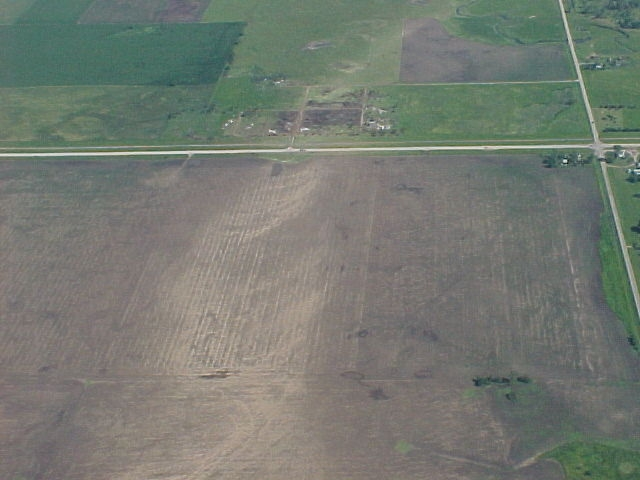
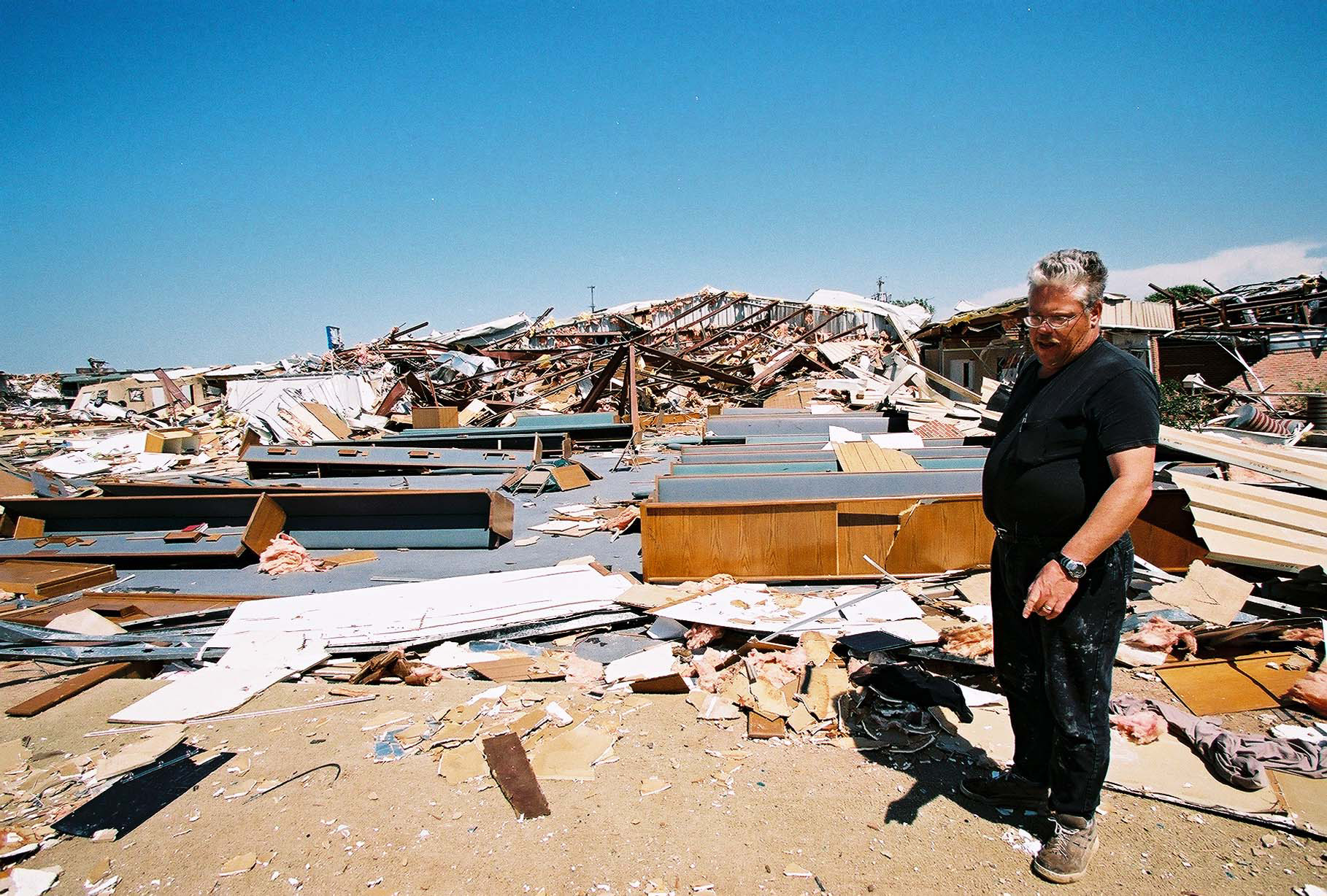
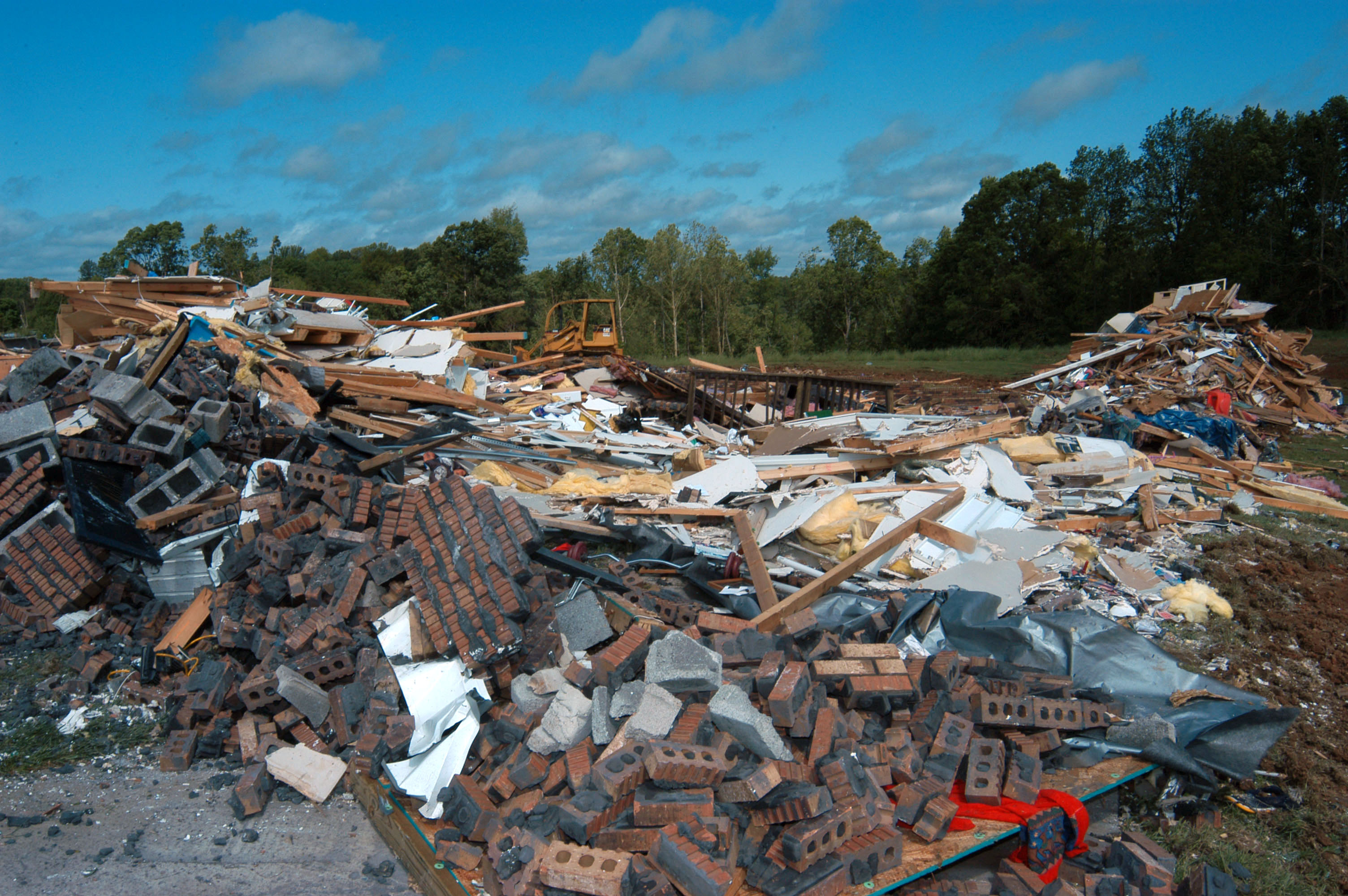
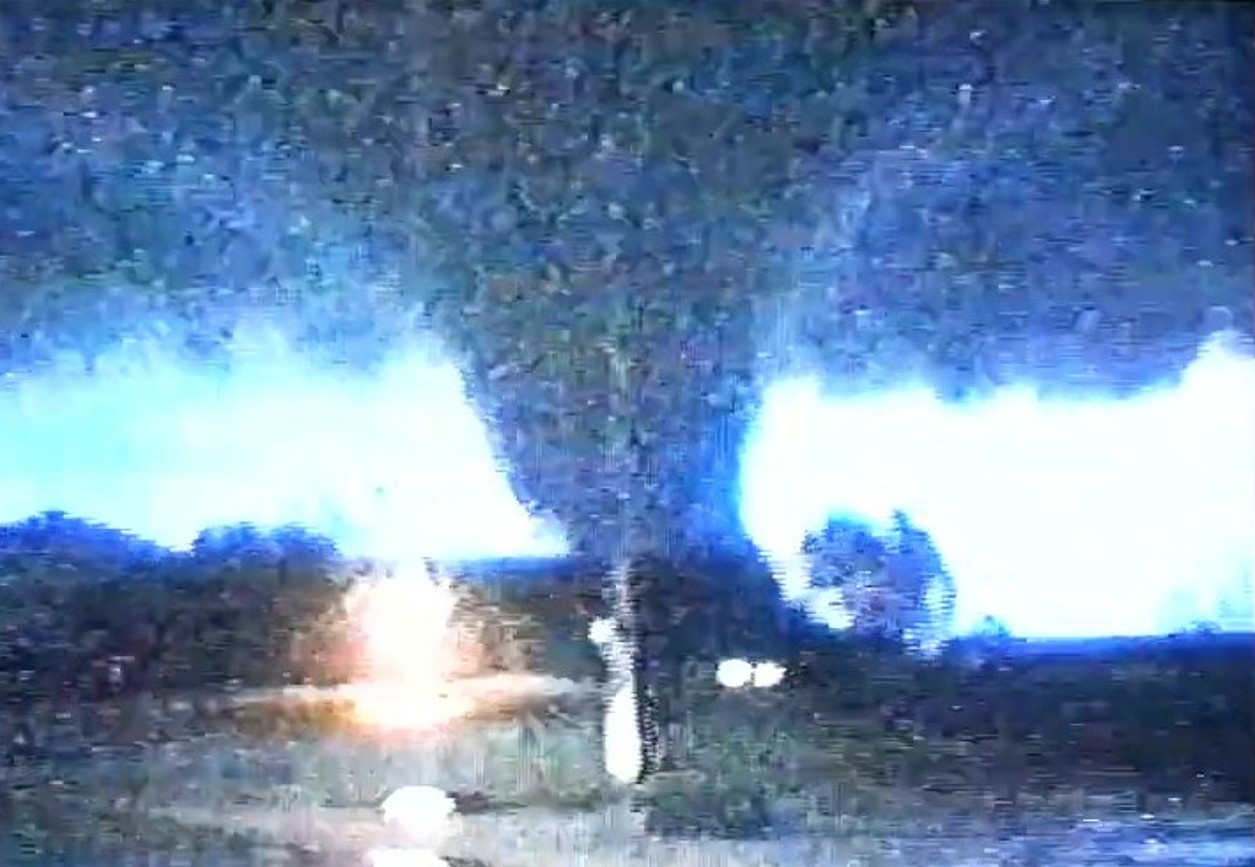
- Clockwise from top: A large F3 tornado near Lyndon, Kansas on May 8; The ruins of a church in Moore, Oklahoma after an F4 tornado on May 8; A radar loop of a tornado producing supercell moving through Kansas City, Kansas on May 4; An F1 tornado near Belmont, Wisconsin on May 10; A home near Clarksville, Tennessee after an F3 tornado on May 4; An aerial view of Manchester, South Dakota after an extremely violent F4 tornado on June 24 showing the ghost town, and cycloid markings in a field to the south.
- Timespan: February 14 – December 23, 2003
- Maximum rated tornado: F4 tornado: List; Gladstone, Missouri on May 4; Liberty, Missouri on May 4; Franklin, Kansas on May 4; Jackson, Tennessee on May 4; Hillerman, Illinois on May 6; Moore, Oklahoma on May 8; Coleridge, Nebraska on June 23; Manchester, South Dakota on June 24
- Tornadoes in U.S.: 1,374
- Damage (U.S.): ≥$1.2 billion (2006 USD)
- Fatalities (U.S.): 54
- Fatalities (worldwide): ≥108

This page documents notable tornadoes and tornado outbreaks worldwide in 2003. Strong and destructive tornadoes form most frequently in the United States, Bangladesh, and Eastern India, but they can occur almost anywhere under the right conditions. Tornadoes also develop occasionally in southern Canada during the Northern Hemisphere's summer and somewhat regularly at other times of the year across Europe, Asia, and Australia. Tornadic events are often accompanied with other forms of severe weather, including strong thunderstorms, strong winds, and hail.

There were 1,395 tornadoes reported in the United States in 2003, of which 1,374 were confirmed. This year is currently the seventh-most active for tornadoes in the United States since reliable record-keeping began in 1950.

== Events ==
=== United States yearly total ===
Confirmed tornadoes by Fujita rating
FU	F0	F1	F2	F3	F4	F5	Total
0	891	355	93	27	8	0	1,374

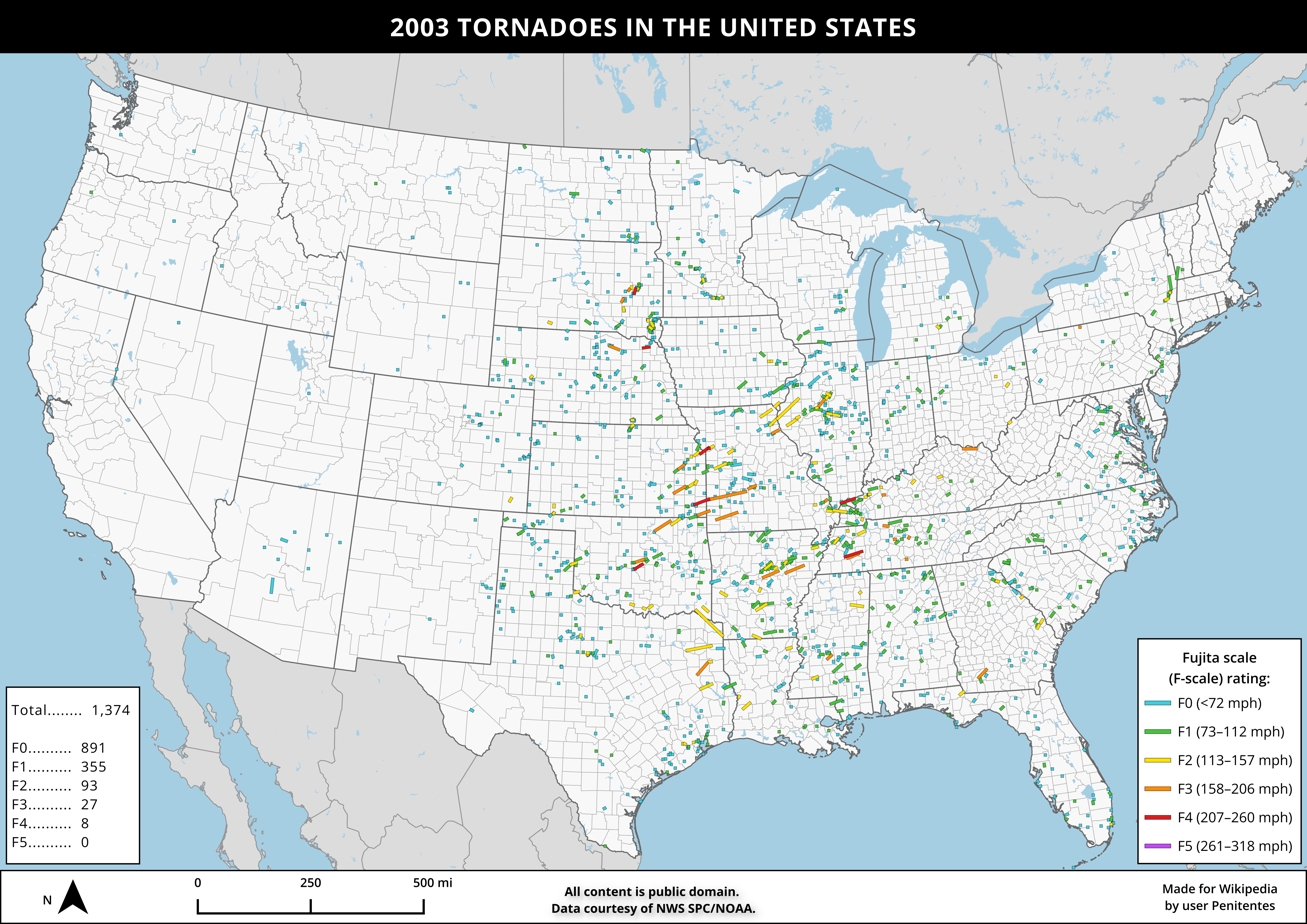
Map of 2003 United States tornado paths.

Fatal United States tornadoes in 2003
- Approximate touchdown location of killer tornadoes in 2003 Summary of tornadoes: February 22 – Kentucky (2 deaths); March 19 – Tennessee (1 death); March 20 – Georgia (6 deaths); March 27 – Florida (1 death); May 4 – Kansas, Missouri (2 deaths); May 4 – Kansas, Missouri (4 deaths); May 4 – Missouri (5 deaths); May 4 – Kansas, Missouri (5 deaths); May 4 – Missouri (7 deaths); May 4 – Missouri (4 deaths); May 4 – Tennessee (11 deaths); May 6 – Illinois (2 deaths); May 11 – Kentucky (1 death); June 22 – Nebraska (1 death); June 23 – Nebraska (1 death); October 27 – New Jersey (1 death); Total fatalities: 54

== January ==
January had no tornadoes confirmed in the United States. It was only the fifth time since 1950 that an entire calendar month went tornado-free. The other months were: October 1952, December 1963, November 1976, and January 1986.

On January 18, a fire tornado was recorded during the Canberra bushfires, causing damage in pine plantations, as well as Chapman and Kambah.

== February ==
There were 18 tornadoes confirmed in the US in February.

=== February 2 (Africa) ===
A tornado killed 17 people near the town of Yumbi in the northwestern Bandundu Province of the Democratic Republic of the Congo. Over 4,000 people were injured, 217 seriously.

=== February 17–18 (Pakistan) ===
On February 17, a tornado killed five people and injured 35 in Gadap Town, Pakistan. More than 80 structures were destroyed, and many livestock were killed as well.

Another tornado struck the next day near Lahore in eastern Pakistan, killing two people and injuring 150. 400 homes were destroyed in four villages.

=== February 21–22 ===
A rare winter storm caused eight tornadoes. At 3:13 PM, an F1 tornado touched down in the rugged rural hills of extreme western Breathitt County, Kentucky, near Athol. Two people were killed as five trailers were destroyed, and many others were damaged.

== March ==
There were 43 tornadoes confirmed in the US in March.

=== March 17–20 ===
FU	F0	F1	F2	F3	F4	F5
0	17	8	1	1	0	0

A tornado outbreak produced 27 tornadoes from Texas to Georgia. During a three-day period from the 17th to the 19th, 22 F1 and F0 tornadoes touched down across a widespread area, mostly in Oklahoma, Louisiana, Alabama, and Tennessee. On the 19th, an F1 tornado near Cookeville, Tennessee killed one person when a trailer was thrown 100 yards. The tornado damaged houses, barns, trailers, garages, sheds, and at least one church. Many trees were downed as well. Another F1 tornado damaged three mobile homes, 11 homes and four businesses from the Rosalie to Flat Rock communities in Alabama.

The final day of the outbreak was the most devastating. On the evening of the 20th, a supercell thunderstorm developed in the Florida Panhandle, producing an F2 tornado that struck Cypress. Two mobile homes and a single-family home were destroyed. 15 single-family and mobile homes were damaged. Numerous trees and power lines were downed. One person was seriously injured, and two sustained minor injuries in the Cypress area. The supercell continued into Georgia and produced an F3 tornado. The tornado tore through Mitchell County, impacting subdivisions on the south side of Camilla. Unbelievably, another F3 tornado followed nearly this same track back in February 2000. Some residents in Camilla rebuilt homes destroyed by the tornado three years ago, only to find their new homes damaged or destroyed by this tornado. The tornado destroyed a total of 66 homes, damaged 200 homes and businesses, with the hardest hit area being the Goodson Road area of Camilla. The tornado then continued into Worth County, producing more damage before dissipating. Six people were killed and 200 were injured.

Both Mitchell and Worth Counties declared a state of emergency as a result of the tornadoes. Numerous trees and power lines were downed as well. Overall, the outbreak caused seven fatalities.

=== March 27 ===
FU	F0	F1	F2	F3	F4	F5
0	4	3	1	0	0	0

Eight tornadoes struck South Florida, including an F2 tornado that struck the Liberty City neighborhood of Miami and caused one death and 14 injuries. The fatality was the first tornado-related death in Miami-Dade County since 1925. As a result of that tornado, the Federal Emergency Management Agency (FEMA) dispersed over $8.4 million in funds. Additionally, an F1 tornado struck North Miami Beach and caused damage to trees and roofs, but no injuries were reported.

== April ==
There were 156 tornadoes reported in the US in April.

=== April 4–7 ===
FU	F0	F1	F2	F3	F4	F5
0	28	9	3	1	0	0

A tornado outbreak spawned 41 tornadoes from Idaho to Alabama. There were three fatalities.

=== April 15 ===
FU	F0	F1	F2	F3	F4	F5
0	3	8	1	1	0	0

A small tornado outbreak struck Oklahoma and Texas, injuring one.

== May ==
There were 550 tornadoes confirmed in the US in May. That set a former all-time record high for a single month until April 2011 with 780 tornadoes, as well as the current record high for the month of May.

=== May 3–11 ===
FU	F0	F1	F2	F3	F4	F5
0	180	121	36	20	6	0

An intense series of tornado outbreaks occurred from May 3 to May 11. Tornadoes began occurring over the affected area on April 30, but the most prolific continuous period was the seven-day period of May 4–10. There were 363 tornadoes confirmed in 19 states and one Canadian province, 1,587 reports of large hail, and 740 reports of wind damage. More severe weather broke out this week alone than any other week in U.S. history, though comparable events occurred in May 1896, 1917, 1930, and 1949 before the modern era of tornado detection. There was a severe weather outbreak every day during the week. There were 48 people killed by the tornadoes, and damages totaled nearly $1 billion. Six F4 tornadoes touched down.

The main meteorological factor for this series of tornado outbreaks was the presence of a persistent 500 mb trough over the western United States, coupled with a series of shortwave disturbances which propagated through the central and eastern United States. These shortwaves provided a mechanism for the deepening of surface low pressure areas, which followed the upper level flow from southwest to northeast. The cyclones induced a strong south to southeasterly flow in the low levels of the atmosphere (1000 mb, 850 mb) off the Gulf of Mexico. This persistent flow provided an abundance of warm, moist maritime tropical air in the central and eastern US.

=== May 4 (Bangladesh) ===
At least 20 people were killed by a tornado in several remote villages in the Brahmanbaria District of Bangladesh.

=== May 18 (Australia) ===
An F2 tornado struck Bendigo, Victoria, Australia, damaging more than 50 houses on a 7 km path.

== June ==
There were 292 tornadoes confirmed in the US in June.

=== June 22–23 ===
Supercell 22 June 2003

FU	F0	F1	F2	F3	F4	F5
0	21	4	2	0	1	0

Hail between the size of softballs and volleyballs fell in Aurora, Nebraska on June 22, along with another storm to the East that produced a tornado. One person died and seven people were injured from an F2 tornado, and another died the next night due to an F4 tornado. One of the largest hailstones ever measured fell, 7.0 in (17.8 cm) in diameter with a 18.75 in (47.6 cm) circumference. 27 tornadoes were confirmed, with all seven injuries and both deaths coming from Nebraska.

=== June 21–24 ===
FU	F0	F1	F2	F3	F4	F5
0	92	20	9	2	2	0

A large tornado outbreak struck the Northern Plains, mainly in the state of South Dakota. The strongest tornado was a large F4 tornado that touched down near Huron, ripping through rural farmland before completely annihilating the town of Manchester. Four people were injured, and Manchester later became a ghost town. Despite 125 tornadoes touching down during the outbreak, there were only 2 fatalities, both being in Nebraska.

== July ==
There were 167 tornadoes in the US in July.

=== July 21 ===
A significant tornado and derecho event affected the northeastern United States. The event began with four weak F0 tornadoes in Indiana. Around 3:20 pm, an F1 tornado touched down in Pennsylvania and struck Kinzua Bridge State Park, destroying the 103-year-old Kinzua Bridge. Many trees were downed throughout the park. At about 7:30 pm, a long-tracked supercell thunderstorm spawned a series of tornadoes along a path of 61 miles through New York and Vermont. It produced an F2 tornado that had multiple vortices at one point, and at its strongest near Kinderhook Lake, New York produced considerable damage. A barn was completely destroyed and its contents thrown into Kinderhook Lake. A car was flipped, one person was injured, and trees were snapped as well. Another F2 tornado near Catskill, New York destroyed several homes and injured seven people. One woman was injured in a mobile home as it was lifted into the air and then smashed into the ground. Additional weak tornadoes and wind damage occurred in Vermont. The most powerful tornado of the day was an F3 tornado that struck near the town of Elysburg, Pennsylvania, where a farm was completely leveled. Another home was extensively damaged, and a car was thrown 600 yd (550 m). A tractor was lofted into a stand of trees as well. Widespread derecho damage occurred as well throughout the region. The derecho itself produced a very intense mesoscale convective vortex, and at times, the entire squall line was wrapped into it, creating a "super-derecho", also known as a landphoon. Overall, the outbreak produced 26 tornadoes.

== August ==
There were 44 tornadoes confirmed in the US in August.

=== August 7 ===
Two tornadoes touched down in Palm Beach County, Florida, rated F0 and F1. The F0 tornado touched down in southeast Jupiter, causing damage to a metal roof in a shopping center, screened porches, and trees, totaling around $50,000 in property damage. The F1 tornado touched down in Palm Beach Gardens, overturning a trailer on Interstate 95. 58 homes were destroyed, 21 suffered serious damage, and 150 had slight damage. 28 people were injured, and damage estimates range between $70–80 million.

== September ==
There were 32 tornadoes confirmed in the US in September.

=== September 23 ===
An F1 tornado hit Ewing and Lawrence townships, in Mercer County, New Jersey. There were no fatalities, but there was widespread damage to homes. The tornado touched down in Ewing near Prospect Street, crossed Olden Avenue, and entered Lawrence Township near the Shabukunk Creek. In Lawrenceville, the tornado followed a path parallel to and slightly northwest of Princeton Pike. Olden Avenue in Ewing was closed for several days while debris and downed power poles were removed. Several retail stores at the Mercer Mall and the Nassau Park retail center were also damaged.

== October ==
There were 26 tornadoes confirmed in the US in October.

=== October 5 ===
Two tornadoes touched down in Brazos County, Texas, rated F1 and F0. The F1 tornado caused severe damage to 25 homes and slight damage to 200 other homes. There was roof damage to some structures, with some tree damage, and one injury was reported. It caused $750,000 in damage. The F0 tornado caused minor damage to a building and caused $3,000 in damage.

=== October 9 ===
Seven F0 tornadoes touched down in Central Southeast Texas, all of them totaling $65,800 in damage. One of them caused damage to buildings and minor roof damage to a home, with windows broken out of a daycare facility. Another one caused roof damage to an apartment complex and caused slight damage to local businesses.

== November ==
There were 53 tornadoes confirmed in the US in November.

=== November 17–18 ===
FU	F0	F1	F2	F3	F4	F5
0	19	16	5	0	0	0

On November 17, the Storm Prediction Center forecast a moderate risk of severe thunderstorms for much of the Deep South from the Ohio Valley to the Gulf Coast as an upper-level low ran into very unstable air. During the evening hours, numerous tornadoes broke out across portions of Southeast Texas and Central Louisiana, resulting in 56 injuries. Most of these tornadoes were weak, but five of them reached F2 intensity. Damage from this tornado outbreak totaled $9.934 million.

=== November 26–27 ===
During the late evening hours of November 26 (the night before Thanksgiving), severe weather broke out across portions of West-Central Louisiana. The worst storm spawned an F2 tornado, which formed in Beauregard Parish and traveled northeast into Vernon Parish.

== December ==
There was one tornado confirmed in the US in December.

=== December 15 (Argentina) ===
An F3 or F2 tornado caused destruction in the small town of Atalaya, in the province of Corrientes, in eastern Argentina. Dozens of homes and cars were destroyed and animals were carried by the tornado. It had a path that was 1 km long. It killed 5 and injured 50.

=== December 19 (Philippines) ===
A EF2 tornado struck San Ricardo in Southern Leyte where it swept away at least 60 houses and Killed 50 people

=== December 21 (Australia) ===
A minor tornado hit near Inverleigh, Victoria, Australia, causing severe damage to a farm.

=== December 23 (Argentina) ===
In the southern portion the city of Cordoba, the second largest city in Argentina, an F3 tornado formed. 400 houses, dozens of cars, and 1000 trees were damaged or destroyed in this tornado, which lasted for 25 minutes and swept through three neighborhoods, making it the longest-lived tornado in the Southern Hemisphere. It was filmed by television cameras and by many people on the ground. The tornado caused five deaths and wounded 90.

== See also ==
- Tornado
  - Tornadoes by year
  - Tornado records
  - Tornado climatology
  - Tornado myths
- List of tornado outbreaks
  - List of F5 and EF5 tornadoes
  - List of F4 and EF4 tornadoes
  - List of North American tornadoes and tornado outbreaks
  - List of 21st-century Canadian tornadoes and tornado outbreaks
  - List of European tornadoes and tornado outbreaks
  - List of tornadoes and tornado outbreaks in Asia
  - List of Southern Hemisphere tornadoes and tornado outbreaks
  - List of tornadoes striking downtown areas
  - List of tornadoes with confirmed satellite tornadoes
- Tornado intensity
  - Fujita scale
  - Enhanced Fujita scale
  - International Fujita scale
  - TORRO scale
