= Senator Klein =

Senator Klein may refer to:

- Jeffrey D. Klein (born 1960), New York State Senate
- Jerry Klein (born 1951), North Dakota State Senate
- Lee Klein (born 1946 or 1947), Nebraska State Senate
- Lori Klein (politician) (fl. 1990s–2010s), Arizona State Senate
- Matt Klein (born 1967), Minnesota State Senate
- Ron Klein (born 1957), Florida State Senate

== See also ==
- Senator Kline (disambiguation)
