= Connie Day =

Connie Day may refer to:

- Connie Day (baseball)
- Connie Day (politician)
