= Elroy Hefner =

American politician (1923–2020)

Member of the Nebraska Legislature from the 19th district
- In office November 30, 1976 – January 6, 1993
- Preceded by: Jules Burbach
- Succeeded by: Connie Day

Personal details
- Born: December 12, 1923 Coleridge, Nebraska
- Died: July 26, 2020 (aged 96) Coleridge, Nebraska
- Party: Republican
- Spouse: Carol Rae Willms (m. 1949)
- Children: 3 (William, Douglas, Cynthia)
- Occupation: Businessman

Military service
- Allegiance: United States
- Branch/service: United States Navy
- Years of service: 1943–1946

Elroy M. Hefner (December 12, 1923 – July 26, 2020) was a Republican politician from Nebraska who served as a member of the Nebraska Legislature from the 19th district from 1976 to 1993.

== Early life ==
Hefner was born in Coleridge, Nebraska, in 1923, and graduated from Coleridge High School in 1941 He served in the U.S. Navy from 1943 to 1946. Hefner served on both the Coleridge School Board and Town Council, and was elected Mayor. He worked as the president of Hefner Oil & Feed Company, and as the director of the Nebraska Petroleum Markers Association.

== Nebraska Legislature ==
In 1976, Hefner ran to succeed Jules Burbach, the Speaker of the Nebraska Legislature, in the 19th district, which included Cedar, Knox, Pierce, and Wayne counties. In the primary election, he faced carpenter James Neal Christensen, funeral director William Hengstler, teacher Ted Hillman, and farmer Warren Patefield. Hefner placed first in the primary, receiving 38 percent of the vote. Though the contest was not resolved on election night, Hengstler narrowly defeated Patefield for second place, winning by 9 votes, and advanced to the general election with Hefner. Hefner defeated Hengstler in the general election, winning 58 percent of the vote to Hengstler's 42 percent.

Following Hefner's victory in the general election, Burbach was appointed the executive director of the state legislature. Governor J. James Exon appointed Hefner to serve out the remaining month of Burbach's term, and Hefner was sworn in on November 30, 1976.

Hefner ran for re-election in 1980, and was challenged by Bert Evans, an economist at the University of Nebraska–Lincoln. In the primary election, Hefner placed first over Evans, winning 71–29 percent. Hefner defeated Evans in a landslide in the general election, winning his second term, 74–26 percent.

In 1984, Hefner ran for re-election to a third term. He was challenged by Evans in a rematch of their 1980 campaign. In the primary election, Hefner placed first, winning 74 percent of the vote. In the general election, Hefner won re-election with 65 percent of the vote.

Hefner ran for a fourth term in 1988. He was challenged in the primary by Evans, Jack McCarthy, and conservative activist Paul Rosberg. Hefner placed first in the primary, winning 66 percent of the vote to Evans's 17 percent, McCarthy's 9 percent, and Rosberg's 8 percent. In the general election, Hefner defeated Evans for a third time, winning 72–28 percent.

== Death ==
Hefner died on July 26, 2020.
