= Emelyn Gardner =

American folklorist (1872–1967)

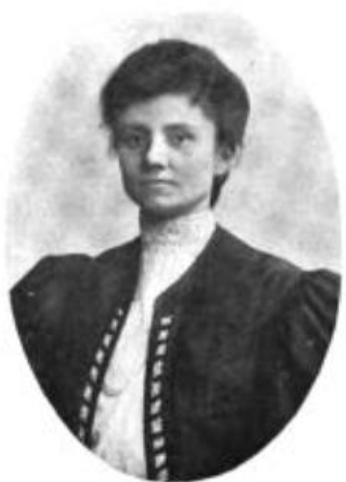
- Emelyn Elizabeth Gardner, from the 1908 yearbook of Western Michigan Normal College
- Born: Emelyn Elizabeth Gardner; July 1, 1872; Laurens, Otsego County, New York
- Died: October 15, 1967 (aged 95); Los Angeles, California
- Occupations: Folklorist, college professor, educator

Emelyn Elizabeth Gardner (July 1, 1872 – October 15, 1967) was an American folklorist, educator, and English professor. Gardner was co-founder with Thelma G. James of the Wayne State University Folklore Archive, one of the oldest and largest collections of urban folklore in the United States. Gardner's 1937 book Folklore from the Schoharie Hills is considered to have been groundbreaking.

== Early life and education ==
Gardner was born in Laurens, Otsego County, New York, the daughter of Emilius Gardner and Ann Eliza Cook Gardner. Her parents were Quakers. She trained as a teacher at the State Normal School at Oneonta. She earned a bachelor's degree from the University of Chicago in 1902. She pursued graduate studies at the University of Michigan. Her 1915 dissertation about the folklore of Schoharie County, New York, formed the basis of her 1937 book on the same topic, considered "an exemplary field collection" and "one of the best regional studies of its era."

== Career ==
Gardner was a school teacher as a young woman, and superintendent of city schools for Geneva, Illinois. She taught at the Michigan State Normal College, and was an English professor at Wayne State University from 1918 to 1942. While there, she trained a young women’s storytelling group, who worked with Italian children at the Chase Street settlement house. She also began acquiring Hungarian folk materials, the beginning of an extensive folklore collection at Wayne.

In 1939, with Thelma G. James, she co-founded the Wayne State University Folklore Archive, one of the oldest and largest collections of urban folklore in the United States. "Emelyn Gardner was pioneering and proving what a large part of our folklore is international and universal and how little of it is unique," wrote Louis C. Jones.

Gardner served as president of the Michigan Folklore Society 1942-43.

== Publications ==
- "Folk-Lore from Schoharie County, New York" (1914)
- "Ballads" (1914)
- "Some Counting-out Rhymes in Michigan" (1918)
- "Some Play-Party Games in Michigan" (1920)
- A Handbook of Children's Literature, Methods and Materials (1927, with Eloise Ramsey)
- Folklore from the Schoharie Hills, New York (1937)
- Ballads and Songs of Southern Michigan (1939. with Geraldine Jencks Chickering)
- "Hex Marks the Spot" (1939)
- "Armenian Folktales from Detroit" (1944, with Susie Hoogasian)
- "Two Ghost Stories" (1945)
- "I Saw It" (1948)

== Personal life ==
Gardner retired in 1942, and moved to Pomona, California, where she lived with her sister Lucy Gardner. She died in Los Angeles, California in 1967, at the age of 95.
