= Marguerite Hicks =

- Born: Marguerite B. Bieber; October 19, 1891
- Died: May 9, 1978 (aged 86)
- Known for: rare books collection

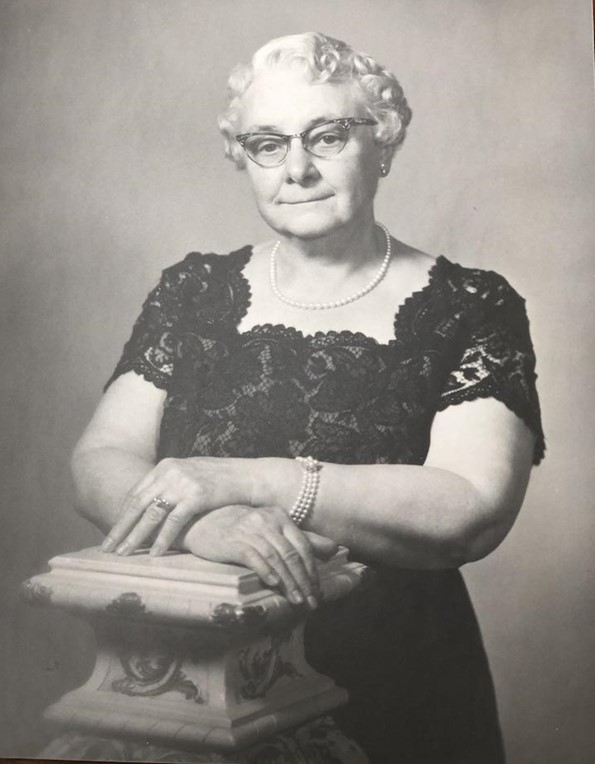
Formal photograph of Marguerite Bieber Hicks, from Oakland University Archives c. 1960s/1970s

Marguerite Bieber Hicks (October 19, 1891 – May 9, 1978) was a queer and disabled Detroit socialite, notable for acquiring a large collection of seventeenth- and eighteenth-century books by women in the 1930s and 1940s.

== Biography ==
Marguerite Bieber was born October 19, 1891 in Dearborn, MI.

She began her undergraduate studies at the University of Michigan, where she was an undergraduate from 1910 to 1911, leaving school at her mother's death. She married Roy Carl Hicks, an accountant for the Dodge motor company, in 1915. They had two children.

When she was in her 40s, Hicks returned to university, now at Wayne State University, to complete a B.A. in English in 1935. She continued her research with an M.A. from Wayne State in 1938. Her M.A. thesis was titled A Survey of the English Women Writers 1652-1700. This research prompted her to begin collecting books by and about women from the period, an unusual choice since this was before many scholars considered Early Modern women writers worthy of study. Hicks was unable to complete a Ph.D. due to her failing eyesight.

Roy Carl Hicks died in 1942. Some time in the late 1930s or early 1940s, Marguerite began a relationship with Thelma James, a folklorist from Wayne State University, who would be her long-term partner. Hicks and James collected rare books together throughout the 1940s and 1950s. In 1971, Hicks sold her collection of rare books to Oakland University’s Kresge Library. James' collection of folklore materials is also now held at Kresge library. Hicks died on May 9, 1978.

=== Thelma James ===
Thelma Gray James (1898-1988) was a professor in the English Department at the Wayne State University from the 1920s until 1963. She had a B.A. and an M.A. from the University of Michigan and specialized in folklore. She helped found the WSU Folklore Archive in 1939, which is now the largest and oldest collection of urban folklore in the U.S.

James and Hicks had certainly met by 1937, indicated by one of the books in Hicks' collection bearing the inscription "To Marguerite with much love, Thelma. M. A. Wayne University, June 17th, 1937." Due to Hicks' increasing blindness, James handled most of Hicks' correspondence, beginning as early as 1938. The society pages of the Detroit News called James and Hicks “great good friends” and “inseparable off-the-campus companions.” James never married, and shared a household with Hicks for 40 years, from when Hicks was widowed up until Hicks's death.

== Rare book collection ==
The Oakland University Library says that Hicks began collecting rare books "in 1923, in preparation for her doctoral research." Megan Peiser and Emily Spunaugle identify her collecting activities as beginning "around the time of her husband's death," and "in the late 1930s to support a master’s thesis in English literature." Her obituary in the Detroit Free Press states that she built her collection "during the 1930s and 1940s, with the help of her longtime partner Thelma James."

Some of the books feature Hicks' own custom bookplate. The bookplate includes an illustration of her sitting at her desk with her dachshund and her cat, and a coat of arms featuring her motto "Virtus Mille Scuta" or "virtue as good as a thousand shields."

The collection contains 913 volumes, of which 363 exist in 20 or fewer known copies in the world, and many are not held anywhere else. Emily Spunagle calls the collection "likely one of the earliest intentional collections of women authors by an American collector." Megan Peiser draws particular attention to the large number of texts "related to the queer relationship of Queen Anne and the Duchess of Marlborough—possibly the earliest interest in collecting materials related to lesbian relationships in Early Modern England." Peiser finds it particularly notable that "Hicks was a disabled queer woman seeking out literature by and about women—and specifically about queer women—before the feminist recovery movement of the 1970s."
