= Gene Tyson =

American politician (1931–2015)

Member of the Nebraska Legislature from the 19th district
- In office January 8, 1997 – January 5, 2005
- Preceded by: Lee Klein
- Succeeded by: Mike Flood

Personal details
- Born: July 26, 1931 Omaha, Nebraska
- Died: October 10, 2015 (aged 84) Omaha, Nebraska
- Party: Republican
- Spouse(s): Barbara Marie Tucker (m. 1956; died 1996) Marjoe Wagner (m. 1999)
- Children: 6 (Anne, Claire, Catherine, Elizabeth, Brian, Joseph)

Military service
- Allegiance: United States
- Branch/service: United States Air Force
- Years of service: 1950–1954

Gene Tyson (July 26, 1931 – October 10, 2015) was a Republican politician from Nebraska who served as a member of the Nebraska Legislature from the 19th district from 1997 to 2005.

== Early career ==
Tyson was born in Omaha, Nebraska, and graduated from Creighton Preparatory School in 1949. He served in the U.S. Air Force from 1950 to 1954, and worked as a collection manager at the First National Bank of Omaha and as a controller and sales manager at Nucor. Tyson served on the Norfolk City Council.

== Nebraska Legislature ==
In 1996, Tyson ran against Democratic State Senator Lee Klein, who had been appointed the previous year to serve out the remainder of State Senator Connie Day. In the primary election, Klein placed first over Tyson, winning 54 percent of the vote to Tyson's 46 percent. The two advanced to the general election, and Tyson received support from the Nebraska Republican Party, who had targeted Klein for defeat. Tyson ultimately defeated Klein by a narrow margin, winning his first term in the legislature, 53–47 percent.

Tyson ran for re-election in 2000, and was re-elected unopposed. He was term-limited in 2004, and was succeeded by fellow Republican Mike Flood.

== Death ==
Tyson died on October 10, 2015.
