= Senator Kline =

Senator Kline may refer to:

- Adam W. Kline (1818–1898), New York State Senate
- Adam Kline (born 1944), Washington State Senate
- Charles H. Kline (1870–1933), Pennsylvania State Senate
- Ernest Kline (1929–2009), Pennsylvania State Senate

== See also ==
- Senator Klein (disambiguation)
