= Eloise Ramsey =

American educator

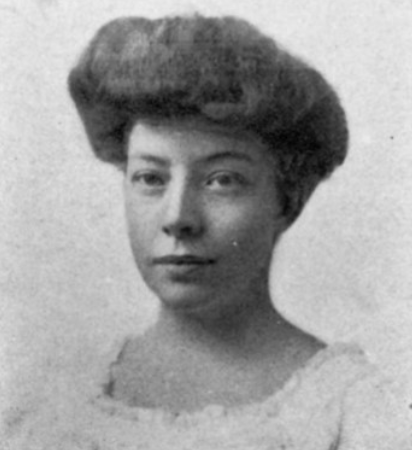
- Eloise Ramsey, from the 1910 yearbook of the Madison State Normal School in South Dakota
- Born: January 4, 1886; South Dakota, United States
- Died: November 19, 1964 (aged 78); Detroit, Michigan, United States
- Occupations: Educator, scholar of children's literature

Eloise Ramsey (January 4, 1886 – November 19, 1964) was an American educator and a collector and scholar of children's literature. She was a professor of education at Wayne State University in Michigan from 1919 to 1956.

== Early life and education ==
Ramsey was raised in Woonsocket, South Dakota, the daughter of Samuel A. Ramsey and Luella A. Storer Ramsey. Her father, an attorney, was the first president of the South Dakota Equal Suffrage Association. Her mother was president of the South Dakota WCTU. She followed her parents' work and supported the causes of women's suffrage and temperance. She earned a bachelor's degree and a master's degree from Ohio State University. Her thesis was titled "A Study of the Plays of John M. Synge with Special Reference to the Problem of Dramatic Action" (1914).

== Career ==
After a few years of school teaching, Ramsey was training teachers in Illinois and South Dakota. She began as an instructor at the Detroit Normal School in 1919. She became a professor when the school became a college, and then a university until she retired in 1956. She successfully campaigned for a children's literature section in the school's library, which is now named the Eloise Ramsey Collection of Literature for Young People, in her memory.

Ramsey lectured on children's reading, encouraging parents to choose interesting, well-written books, and not to over-explain plots or vocabulary. "Give the child an opportunity to enjoy his own reactions," she said in 1928. "If a grownup is bored by a child's book, you may be sure the child will be bored by it too," she declared in a 1929 talk. She also praised newspaper comics in that talk, saying "We don't want our children to become intellectual snobs." In the 1950s, she selected the books to be featured at the Detroit Historical Museum's annual Children's Book Fair. "Because of her, Detroit has gained a reputation for putting on the most selective book fair in the country," reported the Detroit Free Press in 1958.

Ramsey was an active member of the National Council of Teachers of English, and the American Association of University Women.

== Publications ==
Ramsey was author or co-author of three books. Her academic articles were published in professional journals including The Elementary English Review, The Detroit Journal of Education, and, most frequently, Childhood Education.

- "Adventures in Letters" (1931)
- "Children's Books of the Year" (1935)
- "Creative Reading" (1930)
- "Introducing the Illustrator" (1938)
- "Reading for Fun" (1934)
- "Recovering Lost-Horizons" (1940)
- "Seeing the Calendar in Perspective" (1939)
- "Social Backgrounds in Children's Literature" (1936)
- "The Calendar in Books" (1939)
- "The Making of American Ideals: A Pageant-Masque" (1921)
- "The Poetry Hour" (1931)
- "Verse-Speaking Choirs for Children" (1936)
- A Handbook of Children's Literature, Methods, and Materials (1927, with Emelyn Elizabeth Gardner)
- Folklore for Children and Young People: A Critical and Descriptive Bibliography for Use in the Elementary and Intermediate School (1952, with Dorothy Howard)
- Syllabus for a course in literature for children (1929)

== Personal life ==
Ramsey died in 1964, in Detroit, at the age of 78. Her papers are in the archives of Wayne State University.
