= Thelma G. James =

American folklorist and academic

Thelma Gray James
- Born: 1899; Detroit, Michigan
- Died: 1988 (aged 88–89)
- Occupation(s): Folklorist, college professor, president of the American Folklore Society
- Years active: 1920s-1967
- Partner: Marguerite Hicks

Thelma Gray James (1899–1988) was a folklorist and lecturer. She was a pioneer of the collection and study of urban folk traditions and was elected president of the American Folklore Society in 1949.

== Education ==
James was born in Detroit, Michigan into a Quaker family. She attended the University of Michigan, graduating with a BA in 1920 and an MA in 1923. She also took graduate studies courses in Folklore at the University of Chicago.

== Career ==
In 1923, James was appointed a junior lecturer in the English Department at the Colleges of the City of Detroit, later Wayne State University.

With her colleague, the folklorist Emelyn Elizabeth Gardner, James founded the Wayne State University Folklore Archive in 1939. Both women had been involved in the settlement-house movement, actions which influenced their work on the archive.

The Folklore archive contains "the oldest and largest record of urban folk traditions in the United States" and consists of field research projects carried out by Wayne State University students. The archive mostly consists of transcripts of oral interviews conducted - and photographs taken - by the students as part of their research.

The strengths of the archive lie in modern industrial and occupational folklore, "reflecting the rich ethnic diversity and work-oriented heritage of Detroit and southeastern Michigan".

Gardner retired in 1941 but James continued supervising student projects until her retirement from Wayne State in 1967. Research into urban folklore continued at Wayne State University, with records in the Folklore Archive dating up to the 1990s.

== Recognition ==
James served as President of the Michigan Folklore Society between 1949 and 1950. She was elected President of the American Folklore Society in 1949 and also elected as a Fellow of the Society in 1961.

James did not publish many articles based on urban folklore. A paper of hers, "European Folklore Found in A Modern City", was read in her absence at the Western Folklore Conference in 1945. Despite her lack of publications, her influence on urban folklore research and scholarship has been recognised.

== Personal life ==
James's long-term companion was Marguerite Hicks.

== Selected publications ==
James, Thelma G. (1933). "The English and Scottish Popular Ballads of Francis J. Child". The Journal of American Folklore. 46 (179): 51–68. doi:10.2307/535849. ISSN 0021-8715.

James, Thelma G. (1948). "The Editors' Page: Folklore and Propaganda". The Journal of American Folklore. 61 (241): 311–311. ISSN 0021-8715.
