= Woonsocket, South Dakota =

- City
- Motto: "The Town with the Beautiful Lake"
- Location in Sanborn County and the state of South Dakota
- Coordinates: 44°03′15″N 98°16′20″W
- Country: United States
- State: South Dakota
- County: Sanborn
- Incorporated: 1888

Area
  - Total: 0.80 sq mi (2.06 km^{2})
  - Land: 0.78 sq mi (2.03 km^{2})
  - Water: 0.012 sq mi (0.03 km^{2})
- Elevation: 1,303 ft (397 m)

Population (2020)
  - Total: 631
  - Density: 805/sq mi (310.7/km^{2})
- Time zone: UTC-6 (Central (CST))
  - Summer (DST): UTC-5 (CDT)
- ZIP code: 57385
- Area code: 605
- FIPS code: 46-72700
- GNIS feature ID: 1267662
- Website: The City of Woonsocket, South Dakota

Woonsocket is a city in Sanborn County, South Dakota, United States. The population was 631 at the 2020 census. It is the county seat of Sanborn County.

== History ==
Woonsocket was developed in 1883 as a railroad town because of its location at the junction on the Chicago, Milwaukee and Saint Paul Railroad. C.H. Prior, the superintendent of the railroad, named the town Woonsocket after his home town of Woonsocket, Rhode Island. The town was incorporated in 1888.

Woonsocket was known for an artesian well which was drilled in 1888. It was claimed that in its prime, the well flowed over 8,000 gallons per minute out of the six inch wide pipe. The well was capped off in 1906.

=== 2003 South Dakota tornado outbreak ===
On June 24, 2003, an F3 tornado passed just west of town; it was one of 67 tornadoes that touched down on June 24, holding a record for "Most tornadoes to touch down in the state in one day".

== Geography ==
According to the United States Census Bureau, the city has a total area of 0.79 square miles (2.05 km^{2}), of which 0.78 square miles (2.02 km^{2}) is land and 0.01 square miles (0.03 km^{2}) is water.

== Demographics ==
Historical population
Census	Pop.	Note	%±
1890	687		—
1900	648		−5.7%
1910	1,027		58.5%
1920	1,368		33.2%
1930	1,108		−19.0%
1940	1,050		−5.2%
1950	1,051		0.1%
1960	1,035		−1.5%
1970	852		−17.7%
1980	799		−6.2%
1990	766		−4.1%
2000	720		−6.0%
2010	655		−9.0%
2020	631		−3.7%
U.S. Decennial Census

=== 2020 census ===
As of the 2020 census, Woonsocket had a population of 631. The median age was 46.4 years. 22.0% of residents were under the age of 18 and 27.6% of residents were 65 years of age or older. For every 100 females there were 91.8 males, and for every 100 females age 18 and over there were 89.2 males age 18 and over.

0.0% of residents lived in urban areas, while 100.0% lived in rural areas.

There were 267 households in Woonsocket, of which 26.6% had children under the age of 18 living in them. Of all households, 43.4% were married-couple households, 21.7% were households with a male householder and no spouse or partner present, and 29.2% were households with a female householder and no spouse or partner present. About 38.2% of all households were made up of individuals and 19.1% had someone living alone who was 65 years of age or older.

There were 309 housing units, of which 13.6% were vacant. The homeowner vacancy rate was 3.7% and the rental vacancy rate was 9.2%.

Racial composition as of the 2020 census
Race	Number	Percent
White	591	93.7%
Black or African American	0	0.0%
American Indian and Alaska Native	6	1.0%
Asian	2	0.3%
Native Hawaiian and Other Pacific Islander	0	0.0%
Some other race	6	1.0%
Two or more races	26	4.1%
Hispanic or Latino (of any race)	18	2.9%

=== 2010 census ===
As of the census of 2010, there were 655 people, 287 households, and 168 families residing in the city. The population density was 839.7 inhabitants per square mile (324.2/km^{2}). There were 318 housing units at an average density of 407.7 per square mile (157.4/km^{2}). The racial makeup of the city was 98.3% White, 0.3% Native American, 0.3% Asian, 0.5% from other races, and 0.6% from two or more races. Hispanic or Latino of any race were 1.5% of the population.

There were 287 households, of which 24.0% had children under the age of 18 living with them, 45.3% were married couples living together, 10.8% had a female householder with no husband present, 2.4% had a male householder with no wife present, and 41.5% were non-families. 37.6% of all households were made up of individuals, and 21.3% had someone living alone who was 65 years of age or older. The average household size was 2.13 and the average family size was 2.79.

The median age in the city was 48.9 years. 21.2% of residents were under the age of 18; 4.8% were between the ages of 18 and 24; 18.7% were from 25 to 44; 27.8% were from 45 to 64; and 27.5% were 65 years of age or older. The gender makeup of the city was 48.9% male and 51.1% female.

=== 2000 census ===
As of the census of 2000, there were 720 people, 301 households, and 192 families residing in the city. The population density was 918.4 inhabitants per square mile (354.6/km^{2}). There were 330 housing units at an average density of 420.9 per square mile (162.5/km^{2}). The racial makeup of the city was 97.50% White, 0.42% Native American, 1.11% Asian, 0.42% from other races, and 0.56% from two or more races. Hispanic or Latino of any race were 1.39% of the population.

There were 301 households, out of which 26.6% had children under the age of 18 living with them, 52.2% were married couples living together, 9.3% had a female householder with no husband present, and 35.9% were non-families. 31.6% of all households were made up of individuals, and 19.6% had someone living alone who was 65 years of age or older. The average household size was 2.27 and the average family size was 2.83.

In the city, the population was spread out, with 20.4% under the age of 18, 10.3% from 18 to 24, 22.6% from 25 to 44, 20.4% from 45 to 64, and 26.3% who were 65 years of age or older. The median age was 43 years. For every 100 females, there were 87.5 males. For every 100 females age 18 and over, there were 84.8 males.

The median income for a household in the city was $30,341, and the median income for a family was $38,304. Males had a median income of $26,625 versus $17,552 for females. The per capita income for the city was $24,035. About 5.3% of families and 8.5% of the population were below the poverty line, including 8.2% of those under age 18 and 12.6% of those age 65 or over.

== Notable people ==
- George L. Cross, former president of the University of Oklahoma from 1943 to 1968.
- Eleanor McGovern, wife of George McGovern
- Eloise Ramsey, professor at Wayne State University, authority on children's literature
- Volney F. Warner, retired United States Army four-star general.

== See also ==
- List of cities in South Dakota
