= Buffalo Lake, Minnesota =

City in Minnesota, United States

Buffalo Lake
- City
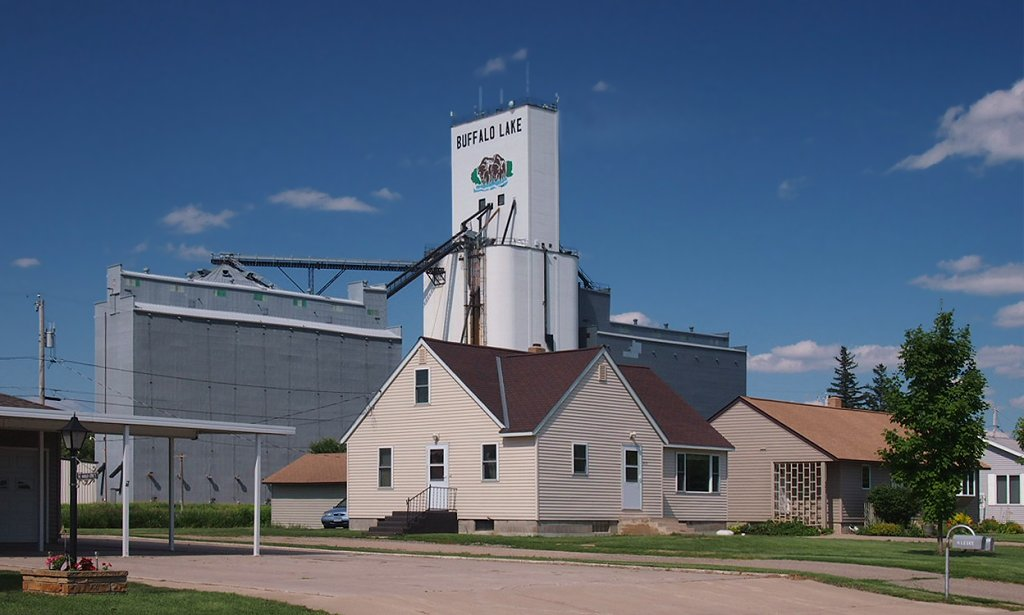
- Residences and a grain elevator in Buffalo Lake, Minnesota

- Location of Buffalo Lake, Minnesota
- Coordinates: 44°44′12″N 94°37′06″W
- Country: United States
- State: Minnesota
- County: Renville

Area
  - Total: 0.68 sq mi (1.77 km^{2})
  - Land: 0.68 sq mi (1.77 km^{2})
  - Water: 0 sq mi (0.00 km^{2})
- Elevation: 1,073 ft (327 m)

Population (2020)
  - Total: 660
  - Density: 968/sq mi (373.6/km^{2})
- Time zone: UTC-6 (Central (CST))
  - Summer (DST): UTC-5 (CDT)
- ZIP code: 55314
- Area code: 320
- FIPS code: 27-08488
- GNIS feature ID: 2393458
- Website: www.buffalolakemn.govoffice3.com

Buffalo Lake is a city in Renville County, Minnesota, United States. As of the 2020 census, Buffalo Lake had a population of 660.

== History ==
Buffalo Lake was platted in 1881, and named after a nearby lake. A post office has been in operation at Buffalo Lake since 1882.

== Geography ==
According to the United States Census Bureau, the city has a total area of 0.68 square miles (1.76 km^{2}), all land.

U.S. Route 212 serves as a main route in the city.

== Demographics ==
Historical population
Census	Pop.	Note	%±
1900	389		—
1910	371		−4.6%
1920	468		26.1%
1930	545		16.5%
1940	637		16.9%
1950	724		13.7%
1960	707		−2.3%
1970	758		7.2%
1980	782		3.2%
1990	734		−6.1%
2000	768		4.6%
2010	733		−4.6%
2020	660		−10.0%
U.S. Decennial Census

=== 2010 census ===
As of the census of 2010, there were 733 people, 288 households, and 176 families living in the city. The population density was 1,077.9 inhabitants per square mile (416.2/km^{2}). There were 327 housing units at an average density of 480.9 per square mile (185.7/km^{2}). The racial makeup of the city was 93.2% White, 0.3% African American, 0.3% Native American, 0.8% Asian, 3.7% from other races, and 1.8% from two or more races. Hispanic or Latino of any race were 8.3% of the population.

There were 288 households, of which 31.3% had children under the age of 18 living with them, 49.3% were married couples living together, 8.0% had a female householder with no husband present, 3.8% had a male householder with no wife present, and 38.9% were non-families. 34.7% of all households were made up of individuals, and 19.5% had someone living alone who was 65 years of age or older. The average household size was 2.35 and the average family size was 3.03.

The median age in the city was 42.4 years. 24.6% of residents were under the age of 18; 5.7% were between the ages of 18 and 24; 22.8% were from 25 to 44; 22.8% were from 45 to 64; and 24% were 65 years of age or older. The gender makeup of the city was 50.6% male and 49.4% female.

=== 2000 census ===
As of the census of 2000, there were 768 people, 294 households, and 197 families living in the city. The population density was 1,235.0 inhabitants per square mile (476.8/km^{2}). There were 313 housing units at an average density of 503.3 per square mile (194.3/km^{2}). The racial makeup of the city was 92.45% White, 0.52% Native American, 0.26% Asian, 6.64% from other races, and 0.13% from two or more races. Hispanic or Latino of any race were 9.64% of the population.

There were 294 households, out of which 32.7% had children under the age of 18 living with them, 54.8% were married couples living together, 8.2% had a female householder with no husband present, and 32.7% were non-families. 29.6% of all households were made up of individuals, and 18.4% had someone living alone who was 65 years of age or older. The average household size was 2.43 and the average family size was 2.96.

In the city, the population was spread out, with 24.7% under the age of 18, 6.8% from 18 to 24, 25.4% from 25 to 44, 17.1% from 45 to 64, and 26.0% who were 65 years of age or older. The median age was 40 years. For every 100 females, there were 87.3 males. For every 100 females age 18 and over, there were 84.7 males.

The median income for a household in the city was $40,000, and the median income for a family was $43,958. Males had a median income of $31,250 versus $25,000 for females. The per capita income for the city was $17,669. About 5.6% of families and 10.8% of the population were below the poverty line, including 17.6% of those under age 18 and 6.2% of those age 65 or over.
