= Lee Klein =

American politician

Member of the Nebraska Legislature from the 19th district
- In office December 20, 1995 – January 8, 1997
- Preceded by: Connie Day
- Succeeded by: Gene Tyson

Personal details
- Born: 1946 or 1947 (age 78–79)
- Party: Republican
- Spouse: Sharon
- Children: 2 (Courtney, Angie)
- Education: University of Nebraska–Lincoln
- Occupation: Farmer

Leland Klein (born 1946 or 1947) is a Republican politician from Nebraska who served as a member of the Nebraska Legislature from the 19th district from 1995 to 1997, and later as a member of the Madison County Board of Commissioners from 2007 to 2015.

== Early life ==
Klein grew up in Battle Creek, Nebraska, graduating from Battle Creek High School in 1965. He later attended the University of Nebraska–Lincoln, and served on the Battle Creek Village Board of Trustees from 1974 to 1978. He was a corn grower, and served on the Nebraska Corn Development and Utilization Board from 1992 to 1995.

== Nebraska Legislature ==
In 1995, State Senator Connie Day announced that she would resign from the state legislature after being diagnosed with cancer. Governor Ben Nelson appointed Klein to serve out the remaining year of Day's term, and he was sworn in on December 20, 1995.

Klein ran for a full term in 1996, and was challenged by Norfolk City Councilman Gene Tyson for re-election. Though the race was formally nonpartisan, Klein, then a "moderate Democrat," was supported by the state Democratic Party, while Tyson, a conservative Republican, received support from the Nebraska Republican Party, which viewed the 19th district as a pickup opportunity. In the primary election, Klein narrowly placed first over Tyson, receiving 54 percent of the vote to Tyson's 46 percent. In the general election, Klein narrowly lost, receiving 47 percent of the vote to Klein's 53 percent.

== Post-legislative career ==
After leaving the legislature, Klein served on the Lower Elkhorn Natural Resources Board of Directors from 1998 to 2007. He was elected the president of the National Corn Growers Association in 2000. Following the election of George W. Bush as president in 2000, Klein was appointed to Bush's agricultural transition team. He ran for the Nebraska Public Power District from subdivision 10 in 2004, but was defeated by Virginia Froehlich, winning 45 percent of the vote to Froehlich's 55 percent.

In 2006, Klein, who had since switched to the Republican Party, was elected to the Madison County Board of Commissioners. He was re-elected in 2010, but was defeated for re-election in the 2014 Republican primary by former Commissioner Jim Prauner.

Following his defeat, Klein joined the staff of Republican Congressman Jeff Fortenberry, who represented the 1st district, as a field representative based in Norfolk. In 2018, Klein challenged Prauner for re-election, but lost the primary, receiving 401 votes to Prauner's 807 and challenger Troy Uhlir's 997.

In 2024, Klein ran for the Lower Elkhorn Natural Resources Board of Directors from subdistrict 2, challenging incumbent Mark Hall, whom he ultimately defeated.
