= Coleridge, Nebraska =

- Village
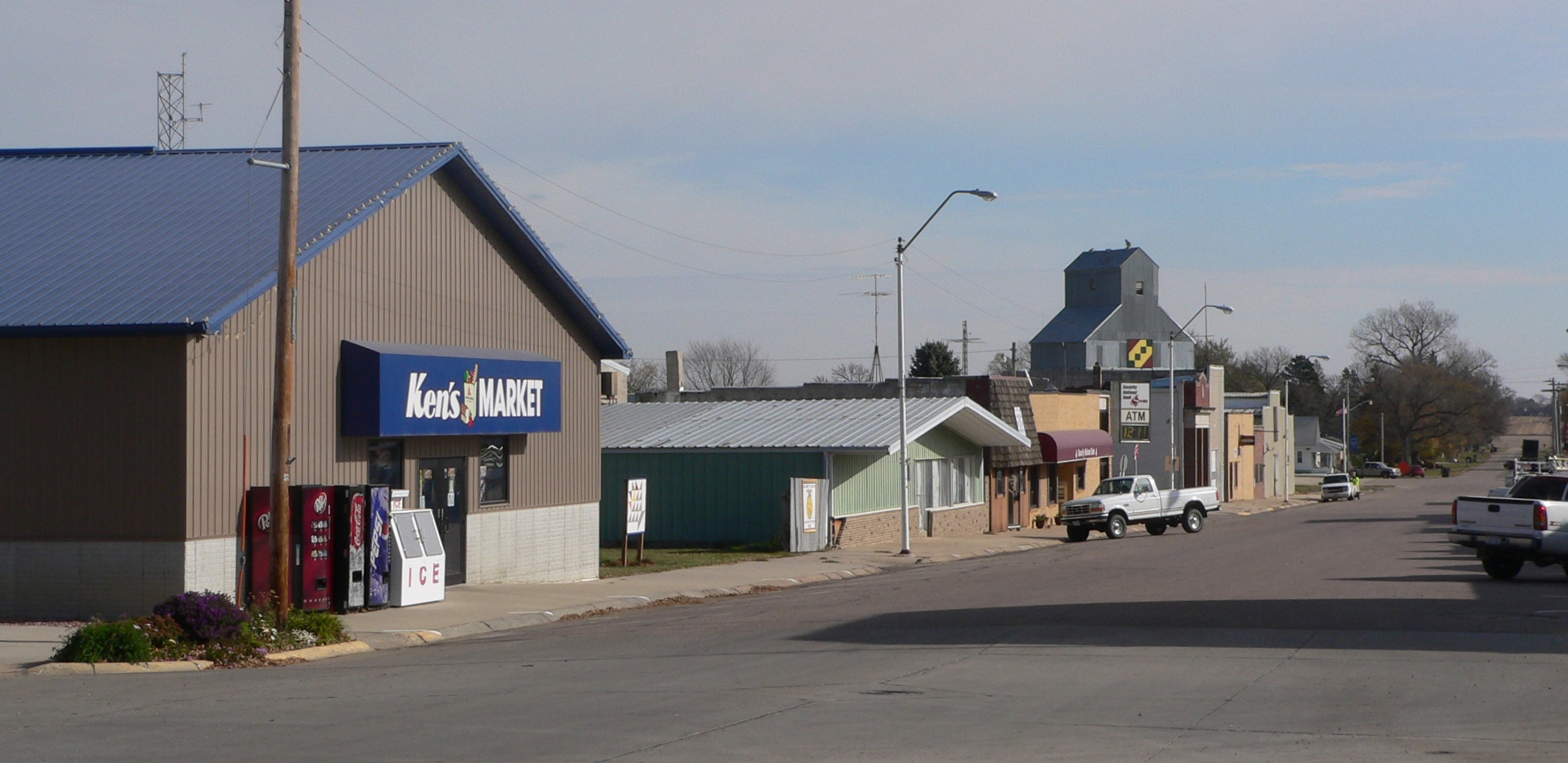
- Downtown Coleridge on Broadway
- Nickname: Heart of Cedar County
- Location of Coleridge, Nebraska
- Coordinates: 42°30′23″N 97°12′10″W
- Country: United States
- State: Nebraska
- County: Cedar

Area
  - Total: 0.51 sq mi (1.32 km^{2})
  - Land: 0.51 sq mi (1.32 km^{2})
  - Water: 0 sq mi (0.00 km^{2})
- Elevation: 1,555 ft (474 m)

Population (2020)
  - Total: 537
  - Estimate (2021): 533
  - Density: 1,050/sq mi (407/km^{2})
- Time zone: UTC-6 (Central (CST))
  - Summer (DST): UTC-5 (CDT)
- ZIP code: 68727
- Area code: 402
- FIPS code: 31-09865
- GNIS feature ID: 2398596
- Website: coleridge-ne.com

Coleridge is a village in Cedar County, Nebraska, United States. The population was 537 at the 2020 census.

== History ==
Coleridge was platted in 1883 when the railroad was extended to that point. It was named for Lord John Coleridge, the Lord Chief Justice of England, who was then paying a visit to the United States.

Mr. Norris and the Chicago, St. Paul, Minneapolis & Omaha Railway failed to reach agreement for a right of way through his town of Norris in 1883. Thus, the railroad was built two miles west of Norris, and lots began selling in what would become the town of Coleridge, approximately three miles west and one mile north of Norris. By early 1885, many of Norris’ businesses had moved to Coleridge. A Cedar County Plat Map (2) showed Norris still having 16 lots at its original location in 1899. The Norris School (District 30), organized March 16, 1880, was dissolved and merged with Coleridge District 41 in 1959. The Norris Cemetery is located outside of Coleridge, one mile east and ¾ mile north of the former city of Norris.

On June 23, 2003, on the 2003 South Dakota tornado outbreak, a devastating F4 tornado damaged or destroyed several homes and farms, unfortunately 1 person was killed. This F4 is overshadowed by the Manchester, South Dakota F4 of the same day.

During the late afternoon on June 17, 2014, a massive EF3 tornado clipped the edge of town. A scoreboard and bleachers were swept away, and trees and power lines were blown down. No casualties were reported.

== Geography ==
According to the United States Census Bureau, the village has a total area of 0.51 square miles (1.32 km^{2}), all land.

== Demographics ==
Historical population
Census	Pop.	Note	%±
1890	315		—
1900	471		49.5%
1910	535		13.6%
1920	674		26.0%
1930	616		−8.6%
1940	627		1.8%
1950	621		−1.0%
1960	604		−2.7%
1970	608		0.7%
1980	673		10.7%
1990	596		−11.4%
2000	541		−9.2%
2010	473		−12.6%
2020	537		13.5%
U.S. Decennial Census

=== 2010 census ===
As of the census of 2010, there were 473 people, 224 households, and 120 families residing in the village. The population density was 927.5 inhabitants per square mile (358.1/km^{2}). There were 283 housing units at an average density of 554.9 per square mile (214.2/km^{2}). The racial makeup of the village was 99.2% White, 0.2% Native American, and 0.6% from two or more races.

There were 224 households, of which 19.2% had children under the age of 18 living with them, 46.9% were married couples living together, 4.0% had a female householder with no husband present, 2.7% had a male householder with no wife present, and 46.4% were non-families. 43.3% of all households were made up of individuals, and 28.2% had someone living alone who was 65 years of age or older. The average household size was 2.01 and the average family size was 2.82.

The median age in the village was 53.3 years. 18% of residents were under the age of 18; 5.9% were between the ages of 18 and 24; 12.9% were from 25 to 44; 31.3% were from 45 to 64; and 31.9% were 65 years of age or older. The gender makeup of the village was 45.9% male and 54.1% female.

=== 2000 census ===
As of the census of 2000, there were 541 people, 242 households, and 128 families residing in the village. The population density was 1,091.7 inhabitants per square mile (421.5/km^{2}). There were 267 housing units at an average density of 538.8 per square mile (208.0/km^{2}). The racial makeup of the village was 98.52% White, 0.18% from other races, and 1.29% from two or more races. Hispanic or Latino of any race were 0.37% of the population.

There were 242 households, out of which 20.2% had children under the age of 18 living with them, 48.3% were married couples living together, 3.7% had a female householder with no husband present, and 46.7% were non-families. 45.0% of all households were made up of individuals, and 28.9% had someone living alone who was 65 years of age or older. The average household size was 2.04 and the average family size was 2.91.

In the village, the population was spread out, with 19.0% under the age of 18, 5.7% from 18 to 24, 18.5% from 25 to 44, 22.2% from 45 to 64, and 34.6% who were 65 years of age or older. The median age was 50 years. For every 100 females, there were 87.2 males. For every 100 females age 18 and over, there were 82.5 males.

The median income for a household in the village was $28,365, and the median income for a family was $41,250. Males had a median income of $25,903 versus $15,714 for females. The per capita income for the village was $15,656. About 6.0% of families and 10.4% of the population were below the poverty line, including 13.1% of those under age 18 and 16.1% of those age 65 or over.

== Tornado History ==
On 6/17/14, a large and dangerous destructive tornado hit the town of Coleridge, Nebraska. It was ranked a 'strong EF3' after the tornado was over. In all, its path was mainly north of Coleridge along the 876th Road. Here, two farm houses would be destroyed and snapped down to their base. Trees were similarly uprooted and destroyed, being snapped in half like twigs. The total path of the tornado, including turns, was around 8.24 miles long.

== Notable people ==
- William Joseph Dendinger (b. 1939), Roman Catholic prelate
- Vernon Simeon Plemion Grant (1902–90), illustrator
- George Stone (1876–1945), Major League Baseball left fielder who was the 1906 AL batting champion
- Cody Ebberson (1982–), Entrepreneur who has founded several Silicon Valley companies
