= Connie Day (politician) =

American politician (1949–2001)

Connie J. Day

Member of the Nebraska Legislature from the 19th district
- In office January 6, 1993 – December 20, 1995
- Preceded by: Elroy Hefner
- Succeeded by: Lee Klein

Personal details
- Born: March 10, 1949 Norfolk, Nebraska
- Died: July 24, 2001 (aged 52) Norfolk, Nebraska
- Party: Democratic
- Spouse: John Day (m. 1971)
- Children: 2 (Nanette, Brandon)
- Education: Nebraska Wesleyan University

Connie J. Day (March 10, 1949 – July 24, 2001) was a Democratic politician from Nebraska who served as a member of the Nebraska Legislature from the 19th district from 1993 to 1995.

== Early life ==
Day was born in Norfolk, Nebraska, in 1949. She graduated from Norfolk Senior High School and attended Nebraska Wesleyan University. Day and her husband founded The Day Companies, and she served as the chair of the Madison County Democratic Party.

== Nebraska Legislature ==
In 1991, following the 1990 census, the state legislature redrew the state's legislative districts. Day was part of a group of voters that challenged the constitutionality of the redistricting plan, which split Madison County. In 1992, the Supreme Court of Nebraska struck down the constitutionality of the redistricting plan, and ordered the creation of a new district consisting entirely of Madison County. Day ran in the newly created 19th district, the creation of which nullified the primary election results that nominated candidates for the previous 19th district.

Day, along with businessman Dick Dungan, Norfolk Mayor Carl Maltas, and insurance agency owner Jim Scheer, gathered signatures to appear on the general election ballot. Day, the only Democrat in the race, narrowly placed first, receiving 34.3 percent of the vote to Dungan's 33.6 percent, winning by 89 votes.

On November 29, 1995, Day announced that she would resign from the legislature following a cancer diagnosis. She resigned on December 20, 1995.

== Death ==
Day died on July 24, 2001.
