= Manchester, South Dakota =

- Ghost town
- Location within the state of South Dakota Manchester (the United States)
- Coordinates: 44°22′09″N 97°43′14″W
- Country: United States
- State: South Dakota
- County: Kingsbury
- Established: 1881 (incorporation), disincorporated in 2004

Area
  - Total: 55.8 sq mi (144.4 km^{2})
  - Land: 55.8 sq mi (144.4 km^{2})
  - Water: 0 sq mi (0.0 km^{2})
- Elevation: 1,610 ft (490 m)

Population (2000)
  - Total: 40
  - Density: 2.1/sq mi (0.8/km^{2})
- Time zone: UTC-6 (Central (CST))
  - Summer (DST): UTC-5 (CDT)
- ZIP code: 57353
- Area code: 605
- FIPS code: 46-40500
- GNIS feature ID: 1268540

Manchester was a town in Kingsbury County in the east-central part of the U.S. state of South Dakota. On June 24, 2003, the town was obliterated by a large F4-rated tornado and has since become a ghost town. In 2004, the state of South Dakota officially disincorporated the town of Manchester. According to the 2000 census, the population of Manchester was 40.

== History ==
Manchester was originally called Fairview; the present name honors Chester H. Manchester, the town's first postmaster. With the influence of the railroad, Manchester underwent rapid expansion, including the building of "numerous homes, a town hall, grocery stores, livery barns, a lumber yard, two grain elevators, a depot, a restaurant, a cream station, a bank, a pool hall, auto repair, blacksmith shops, gas stations, two churches, a system of township schools including Manchester High School, a hotel, a newspaper and a fabled town pump".

Grace Ingalls Dow, sister of Little House on the Prairie author Laura Ingalls Wilder, spent a significant part of her adult life in Manchester. She worked as a teacher in the local school and died in 1941. Her sister Mary Ingalls lived with her for a while as well. Laura Ingalls Wilder spent many years (and set several of her Little House books) in De Smet, a similarly sized town seven miles to Manchester's east along the railroad line.

Into the 20th century, the diminishing importance of the Chicago & Northwestern Railroad line through Manchester slowed train traffic and cut into the town's expansion, causing many to leave the town. This slide continued into the Great Depression as the line lay idle and more residents were forced to close their businesses and move elsewhere to find work. Despite road contact finally being made through Manchester in the late 1930s, little remained to induce people to linger and the few remaining residents began to die off or move away, with many relocating to nearby De Smet or Huron. Having lost many of its residents and its primary means of attracting more, Manchester's population steadily dwindled until a core population of no more than 100 residents remained, with most operating farms and ranches outside the town limits. The CNW railroad officially announced its intended permanent abandonment of the railroad line in 1986, but later sold the tracks to the Dakota, Minnesota and Eastern Railroad. By 2003, less than a dozen structures (including two operating businesses) remained standing on the original Manchester town plot along US-14 and 425th Avenue.

== Destruction ==
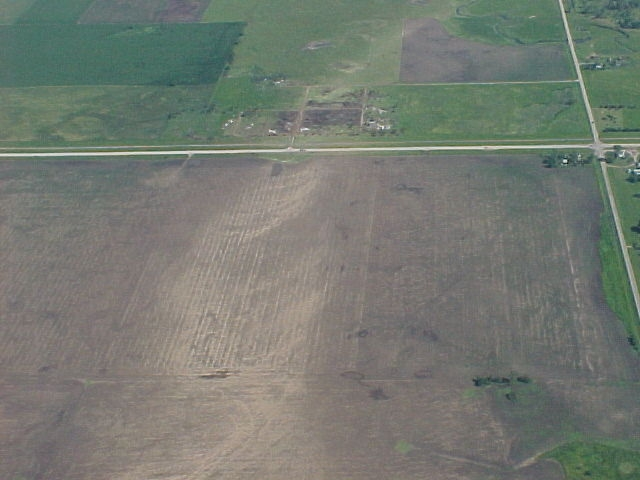
Damage path across Manchester. The tornado approached from the bottom of the photo and tracked north across US-14 and through the town.

On June 24, 2003, a supercell thunderstorm spawned a tornado over eastern South Dakota. The tornado gradually matured and widened, forming a large "wedge" shape, and achieving an intensity of F4 on the Fujita scale and a width of between one-half and one mile as it entered Manchester.

The mesocyclone associated with the tornado was tracked by a large number of meteorologists and storm chasers. A small probe was placed directly in the tornado's damage path. The vortex traveled directly over the instrument, and record-breaking meteorological data was obtained by the probe. It managed to survive winds at the time estimated to be up to 260 mph (418 km/h) and measured a barometric pressure fall of around 100 millibars near the center of the half-mile wide tornado. Current estimates of wind speeds in an EF4-rated tornado would be in the 166-200 mph (267–322 km/h) range.

Manchester was an extremely small and compact town, with the central township abutting the intersection of US Highway 14 and 425th Avenue in rural Kingsbury County and surrounded on all sides by miles of farmland. The tornado struck the town from the south while doing strong F3-F4 damage, and was easily powerful enough to destroy the handful of elderly structures remaining in the town center (including the town post office), as well as several outlying buildings along US-14. According to Dan Kight of the Kingsbury County Sheriff's department: "There's a business that's partially left, but everything else is gone," noting only three or four families lived in Manchester. Also according to Kight, some residents were transported to the hospital with injuries.

Storm chaser Tim Samaras placed several "turtle probes" ahead of the tornado's path and one of them scored a direct hit. It recorded a pressure drop of 100 millibars in the span of five seconds, the deepest and fastest pressure drop ever recorded directly by any instrument in a weather event. The gravel was scoured from the road that the probe was placed in by the tornadic winds but when the probe was lifted there was still gravel underneath it.
