= Preston Lake =

Preston Lake or Lake Preston may refer to:

== Settlements ==
- Preston Lake Township, Minnesota, a township in Renville County, Minnesota, USA
- Lake Preston, South Dakota

== Lakes ==
- Preston Lake (Renville County, Minnesota), USA
- Preston Lake (Ontario), is a natural glacier kettle lake located in Whitchurch-Stouffville, Ontario, Canada
- Lake Preston (South Dakota)
- Preston Lake (Saskatchewan)
