= Van Buren vs. Harrison =

Van Buren vs. Harrison may refer to one of two United States presidential elections between Martin Van Buren and William Henry Harrison:

- 1836 United States presidential election, won by Martin Van Buren against William Henry Harrison
- 1840 United States presidential election, won by William Henry Harrison against Martin Van Buren
