= 1836 United States presidential election =

Election of Martin Van Buren

- November 4 – December 6, 1836

294 members of the Electoral College 148 electoral votes needed to win
- Turnout: 56.5% (▼0.5 pp)
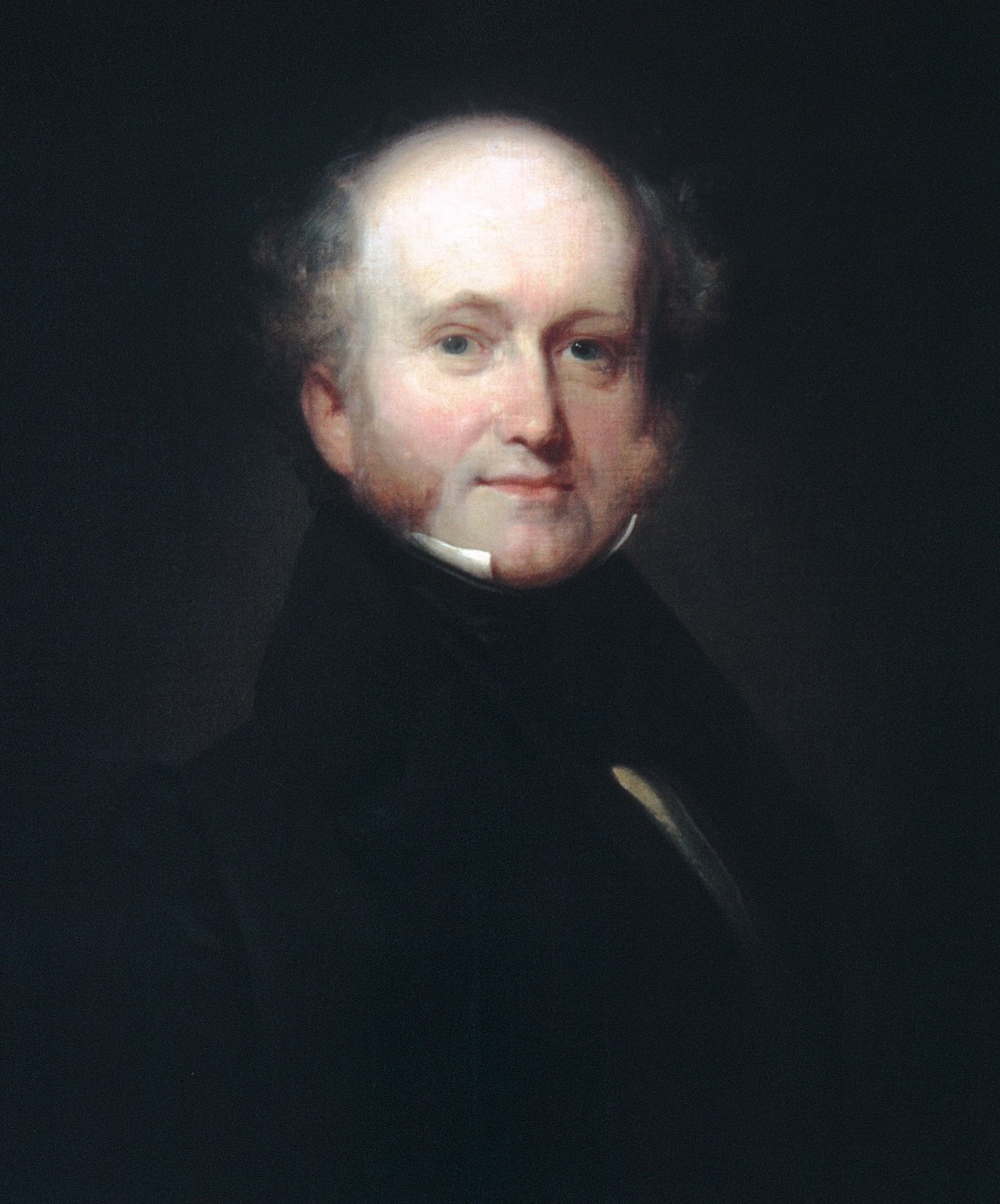

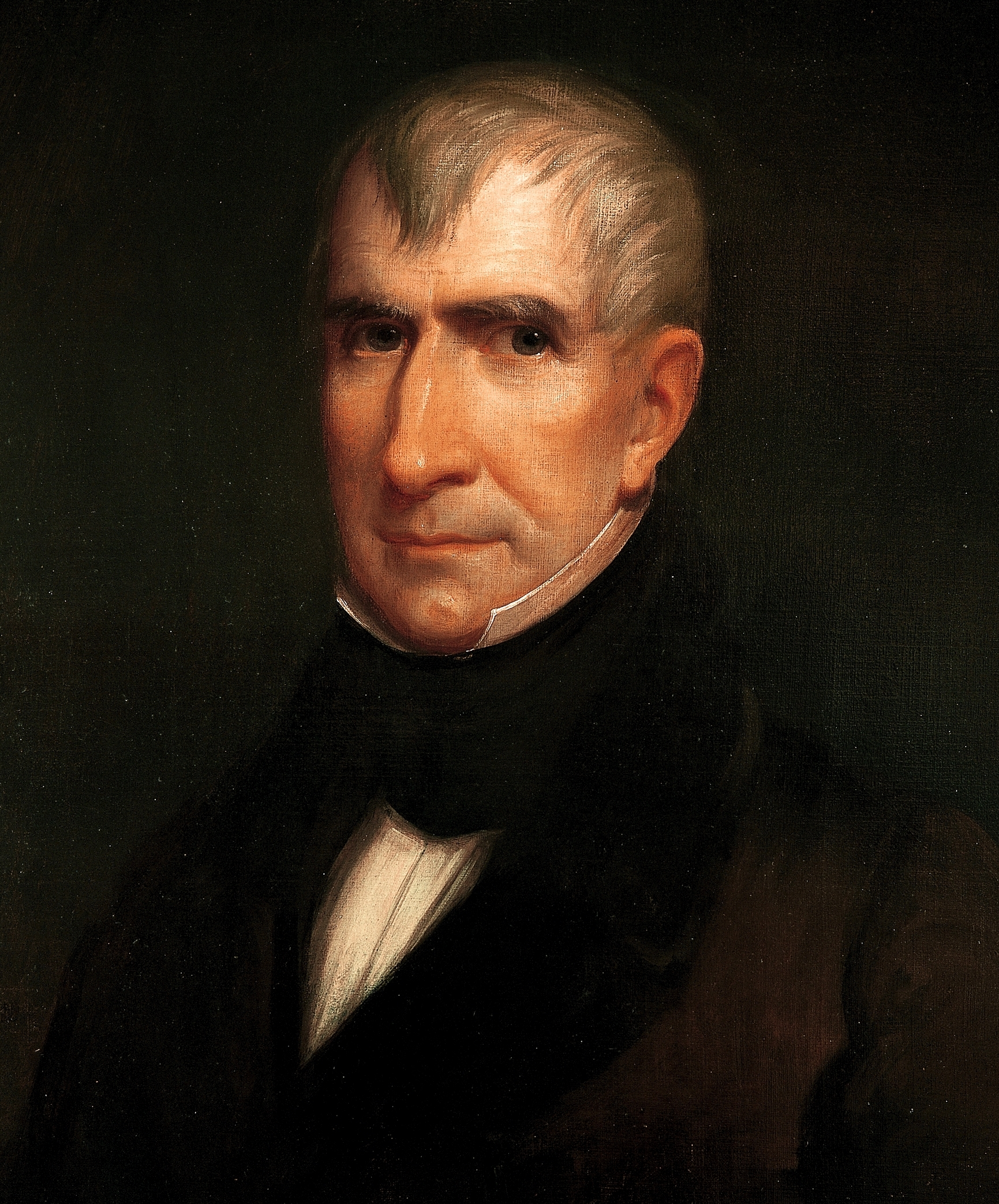

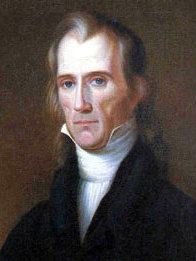

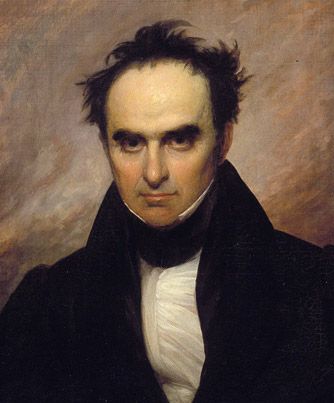

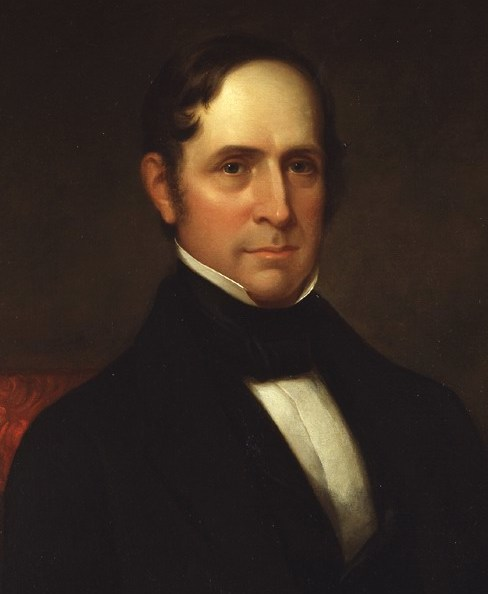
Nominee	Martin Van Buren	William Henry Harrison	Hugh Lawson White
Party	Democratic	Whig	Whig
Alliance		Anti-Masonic
Home state	New York	Ohio	Tennessee
Running mate	Richard Mentor Johnson	Francis Granger (Note: John Tyler served as Harrison's running mate in Maryland.)	John Tyler
Electoral vote	167 (+3 disputed) (Note: Including 3 electoral votes from Michigan. The United States Congress recognized Michigan statehood on January 26, 1837, after the election but before the electoral votes were counted. During the joint session of the United States Congress, the final electoral count was read twice, once with Michigan's votes included and once without.)	73	26
States carried	14 (+1 disputed)	7	2
Popular vote	764,176	550,816	146,109
Percentage	50.8%	36.6%	9.7%
Nominee	Daniel Webster	Willie P. Mangum
Party	Whig	Whig
Alliance		Nullifier
Home state	Massachusetts	North Carolina
Running mate	Francis Granger	John Tyler
Electoral vote	14	11
States carried	1	1
Popular vote	41,201	0 (Note: Mangum did not appear on the ballot in any state that chose its electors via a popular vote. His electoral votes were awarded by the South Carolina state legislature.)
Percentage	2.7%	0.0% (Note: Mangum did not appear on the ballot in any state that chose its electors via a popular vote. His electoral votes were awarded by the South Carolina state legislature.)
- Presidential election results map. Blue denotes states won by Van Buren/Johnson, Buff denotes those won by Harrison/Granger, Burgundy denotes those won by White/Tyler, Pink denotes those won by Webster/Granger, and Teal denotes those won by Mangum/Tyler. Numbers indicate the number of electoral votes allotted to each state.
President before election
Andrew Jackson
Democratic
Elected President
Martin Van Buren
Democratic
- 1837 contingent U.S. vice presidential election
- February 8, 1837

52 United States senators 27 votes needed to win
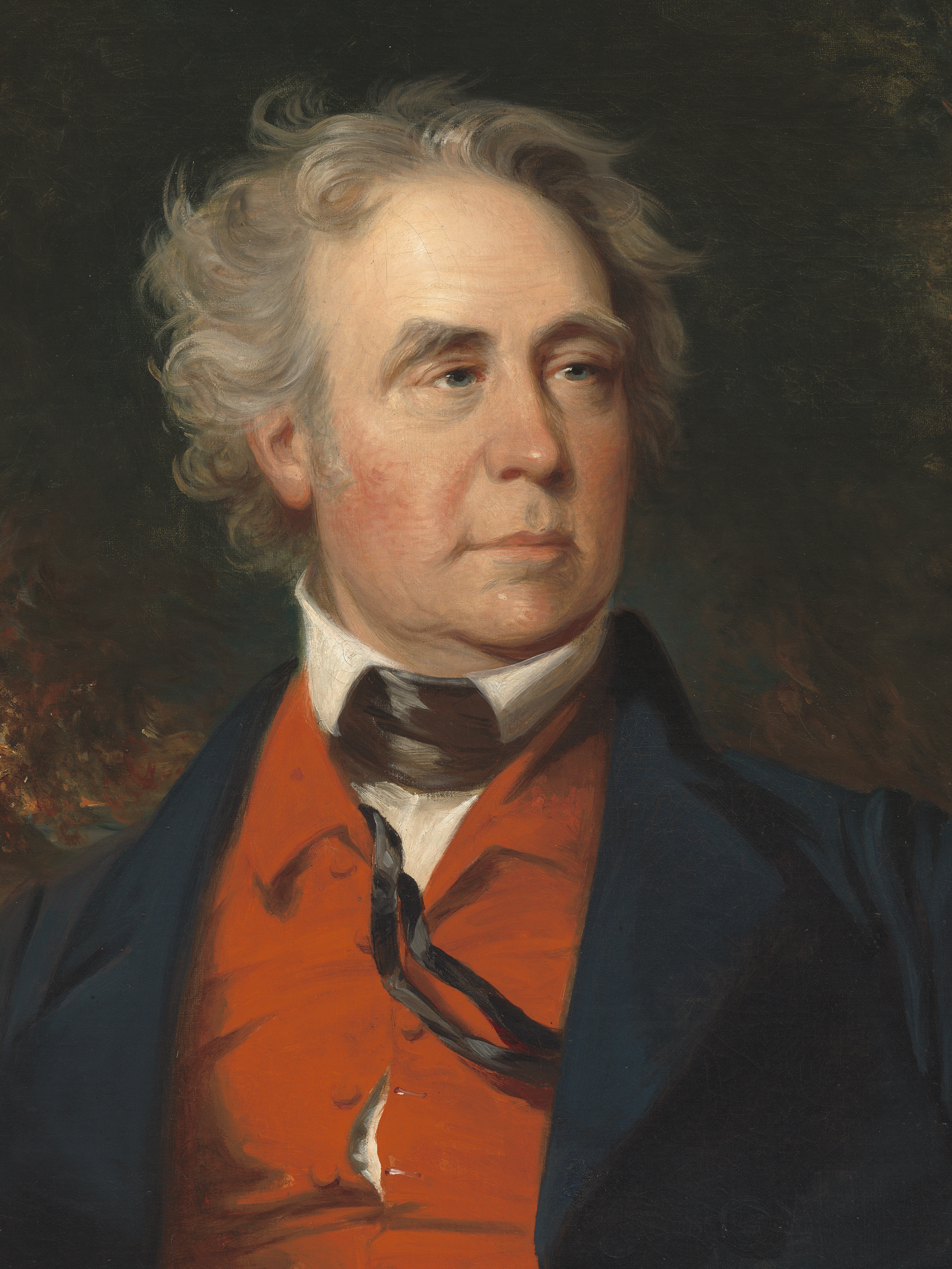

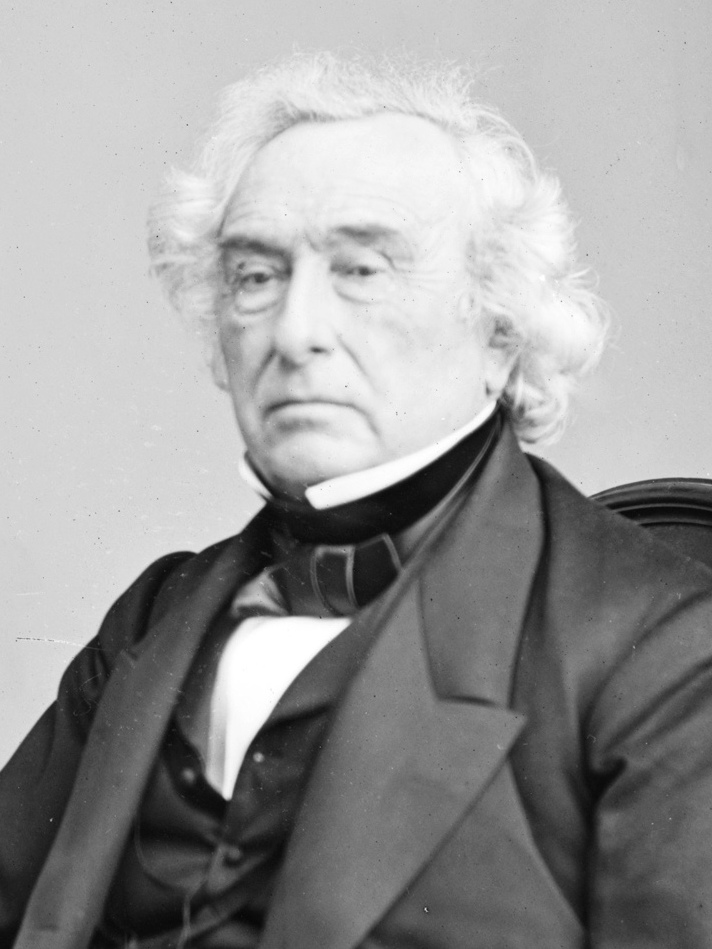
Candidate	Richard Mentor Johnson	Francis Granger
Party	Democratic	Whig
Senate vote	33	16
Percentage	63.46%	30.77%
- Contingent election in the Senate. Blue denotes states that cast two votes for Johnson, buff denotes two votes for Granger, and black denotes abstentions. Hatching denotes states that split their votes.

A presidential election was held in the United States from November 3 to December 7, 1836. Incumbent Vice President Martin Van Buren, candidate of the Democratic Party, defeated four candidates fielded by the nascent Whig Party.

The 1835 Democratic National Convention chose a ticket of Van Buren (President Andrew Jackson's handpicked successor) and U.S. Representative Richard Mentor Johnson of Kentucky. The Whig Party, which had only recently emerged and was primarily united by opposition to Jackson, was not yet sufficiently organized to agree on a single candidate. Hoping to compel a contingent election in the House of Representatives by denying the Democrats an electoral majority, the Whigs ran multiple candidates. Most Northern and border state Whigs supported the ticket led by former Senator William Henry Harrison of Ohio, while most Southern Whigs supported the ticket led by Senator Hugh Lawson White of Tennessee. Two other Whigs, Daniel Webster and Willie Person Mangum, carried Massachusetts and South Carolina respectively on single-state tickets.

Despite facing multiple candidates, Van Buren won a majority of the electoral vote, and he won a majority of the popular vote in both the North and the South. Nonetheless, the Whig strategy came very close to success, as Van Buren won the decisive state of Pennsylvania by just over two points. As Virginia's electors voted for Van Buren but refused to vote for Johnson, Johnson fell one vote short of an electoral majority, compelling a contingent election for vice president. In that contingent election, the United States Senate elected Johnson over Harrison's running mate, Francis Granger.

Van Buren was the third incumbent vice president elected president, which would not happen again until 1988, when George H. W. Bush was elected president. He is also the most recent Democrat elected to succeed an outgoing two-term Democratic president, and the only sitting Democratic vice president to win the presidency. This also marks the last time that the sitting vice president was elected president after only serving for one term. Harrison finished second in both the popular and electoral vote, and his strong performance helped him win the Whig nomination in the 1840 presidential election. The election of 1836 was crucial in developing the Second Party System and a stable two-party system more generally. By the end of the election, nearly every independent faction had been absorbed by either the Democrats or the Whigs.

== Nominations ==
=== Democratic Party nomination ===
1836 Democratic Party ticket
Martin Van Buren	Richard Mentor Johnson
for President	for Vice President
8th Vice President of the United States (1833–1837)	U.S. Representative from Kentucky (1807–1819, 1829–1837)

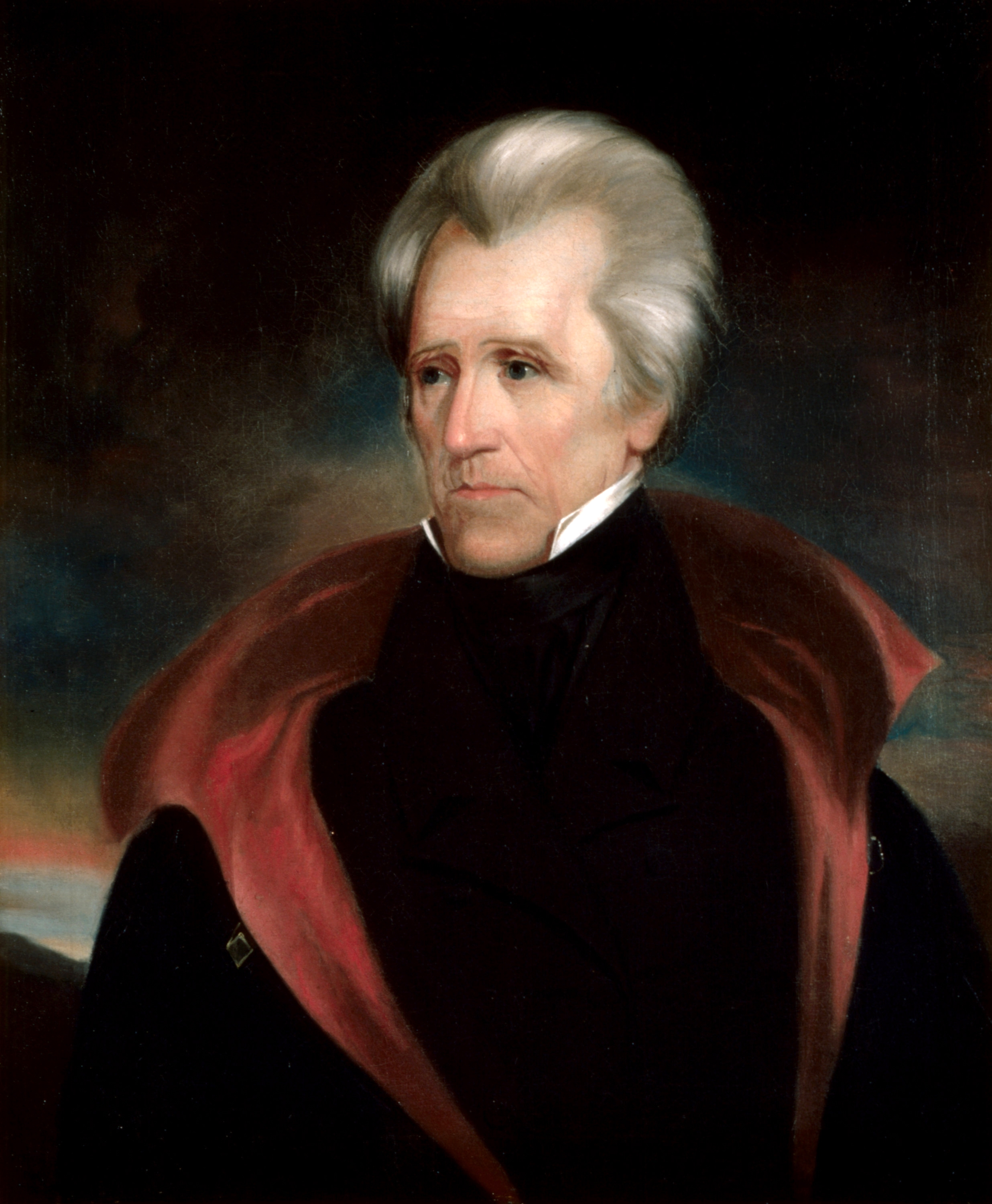
Andrew Jackson, the incumbent president in 1836, whose second term expired on March 4, 1837

The 1835 Democratic National Convention was held in Baltimore, Maryland, from May 20 to 22, 1835. The early date of the convention was selected by President Andrew Jackson to prevent the formation of opposition to Martin Van Buren. Twenty-two states and two territories were represented at the convention with Alabama, Illinois, and South Carolina being unrepresented. The delegate amount per state varied from Maryland having 188 delegates to cast its ten votes while Tennessee's fifteen votes were cast by one delegate.

The convention saw the first credentials dispute in American history with two rival delegations from Pennsylvania claiming the state's votes. The issue was solved by seating both delegations and having them share the state's votes. An attempt to remove the two-thirds requirement for the selection of a candidate was passed by a vote of 231 to 210, but was later restored through a voice vote.

Some Southerners opposed Johnson's nomination, due to his open relationship with an enslaved woman, whom he had regarded as his common-law wife. At the convention, Van Buren was nominated unanimously with all 265 delegates in favor, but the Virginia delegates supported Senator William Cabell Rives against Johnson. However, Rives got little support and Johnson was nominated with one more vote than the two-thirds requirement.

Convention vote
Presidential vote		Vice presidential vote	
Martin Van Buren	265	Richard Mentor Johnson	178
		William C. Rives	87

=== Whig Party nomination ===
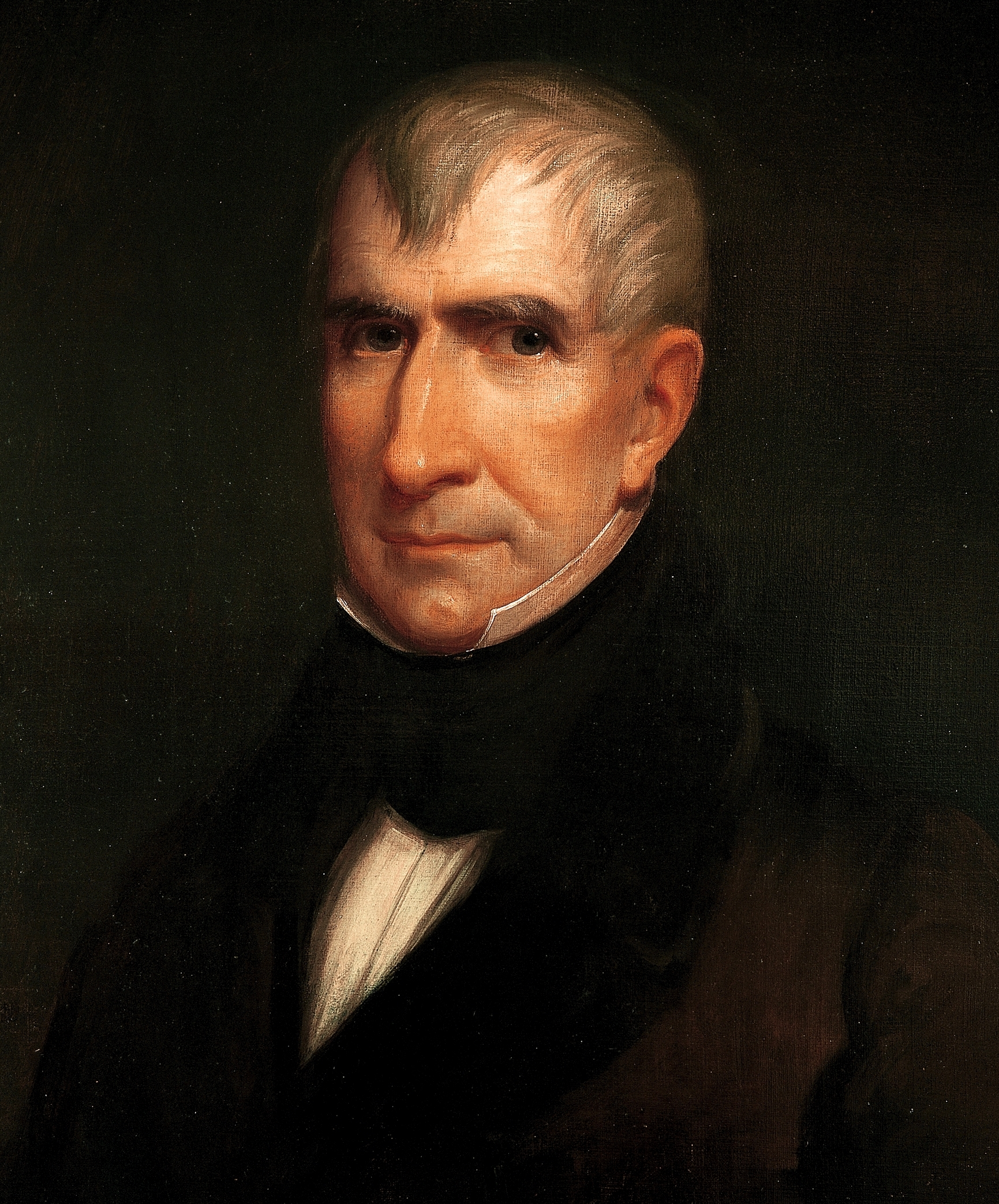
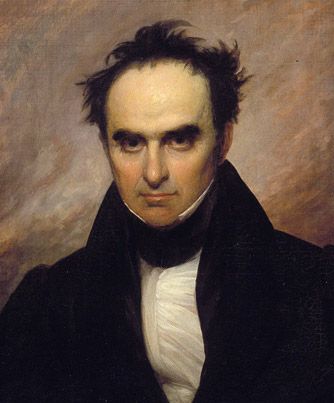
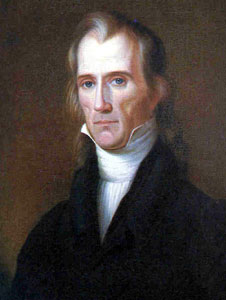
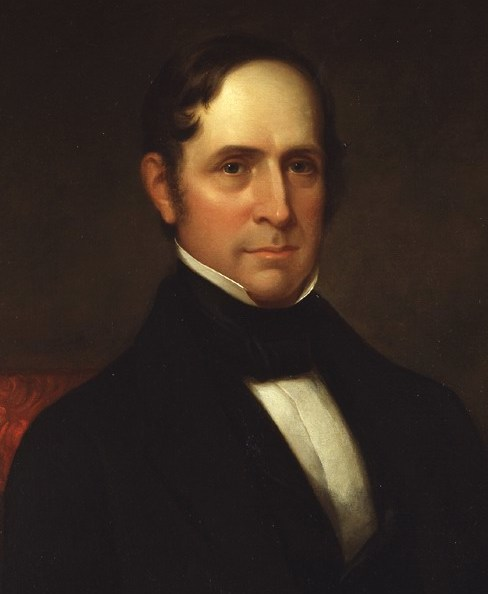
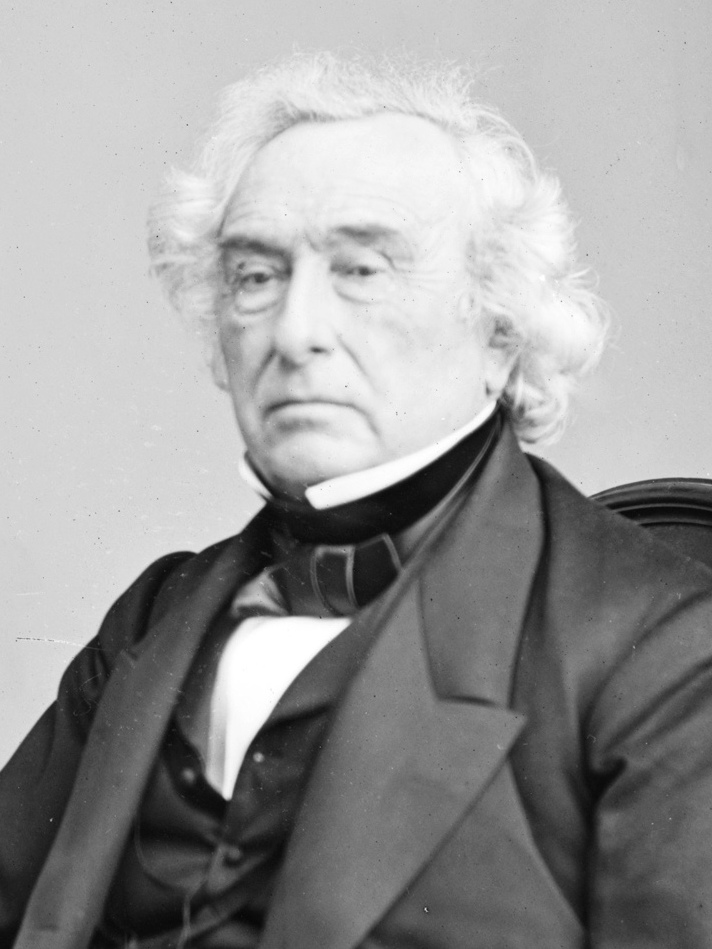
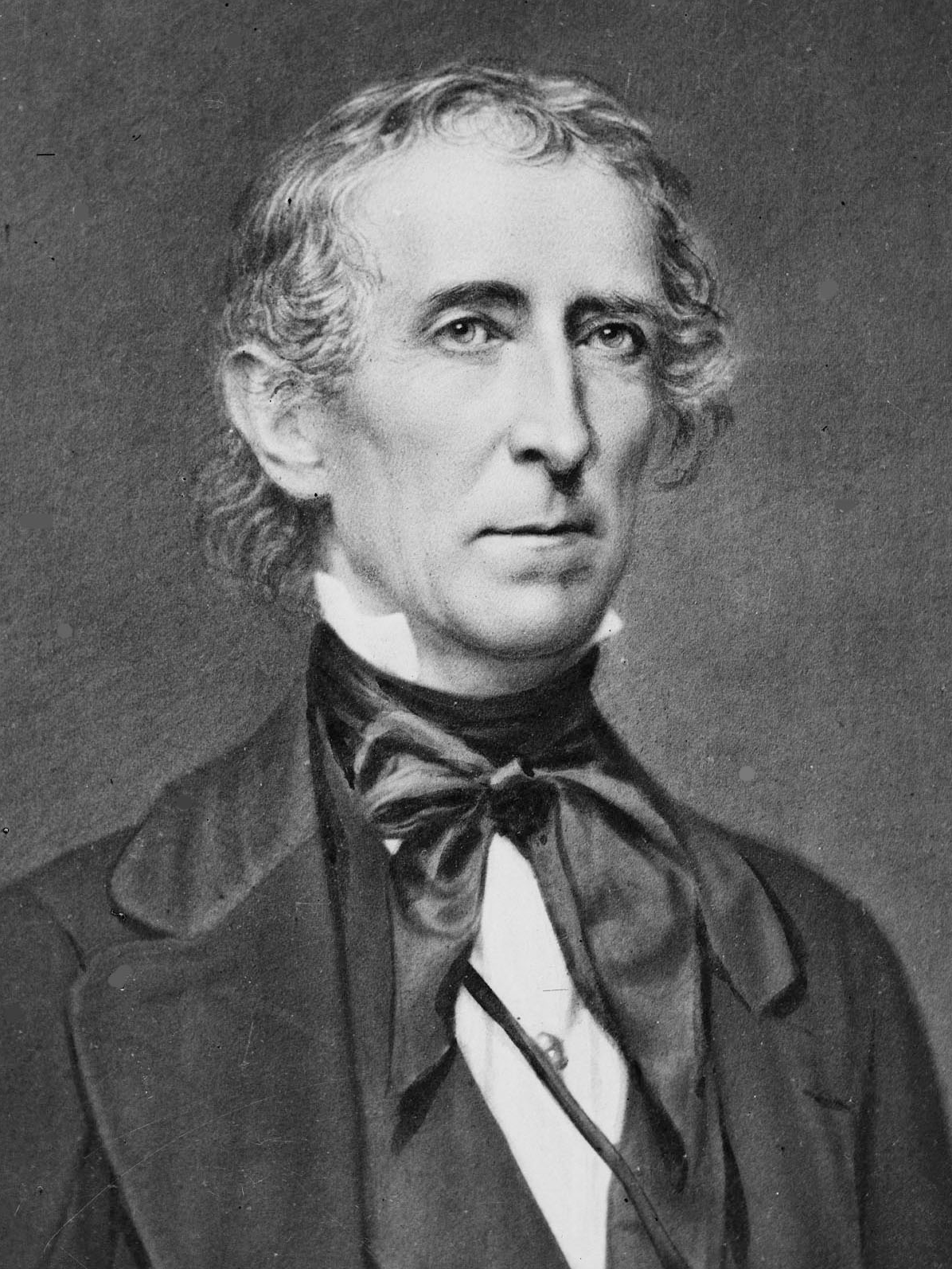
Whig presidential candidates
William Henry Harrison; Former United States Minister to Gran Colombia
Daniel Webster; U.S. Senator from Massachusetts
Hugh Lawson White; U.S. Senator from Tennessee
Willie Person Mangum; U.S. Senator from North Carolina
Whig vice-presidential candidates
Francis Granger; U.S. Representative from New York
John Tyler; U.S. Senator from Virginia

The Whig Party emerged during the 1834 mid-term elections as the chief opposition to the Democratic Party. The party was formed from members of the National Republican Party, the Anti-Masonic Party, disaffected Jacksonians, and small remnants of the Federalist Party (people whose last political activity was with them a decade before). Some Southerners who were angered by Jackson's opposition to states' rights, including Sen. John C. Calhoun and the Nullifiers, also temporarily joined the Whig coalition.

Unlike the Democrats, the Whigs did not hold a national convention. Instead, state legislatures and state conventions nominated candidates, being the reason why so many candidates from the Whig party ran in the general election. Southern Nullifiers placed Tennessee Senator Hugh Lawson White into contention for the presidency in 1834 soon after his break with Jackson. White was a moderate on the states' rights issue, which made him acceptable in the South, but not in the North. The state legislatures of Alabama and Tennessee officially nominated White. The South Carolina state legislature nominated Senator Willie Person Mangum of North Carolina. By early 1835, Massachusetts Senator Daniel Webster was building support among Northern Whigs. Both Webster and White used Senate debates to establish their positions on the issues of the day, as newspapers carried the text of their speeches nationwide. The Pennsylvania legislature nominated popular former general William Henry Harrison, who had led American forces at the Battle of Tippecanoe. The Whigs hoped that Harrison's reputation as a military hero could win voter support. Harrison soon displaced Webster as the preferred candidate of Northern Whigs. State legislatures, particularly in larger states, also nominated various vice presidential candidates.

Despite multiple candidates, there was only one Whig ticket in each state. The Whigs ended up with two main tickets: William Henry Harrison for president and Francis Granger for vice president in the North and Kentucky, and Hugh Lawson White for president and John Tyler for vice president in the middle and lower South. In Massachusetts, the ticket was Daniel Webster for president and Granger for vice president. In South Carolina, the ticket was Mangum for president and Tyler for vice president. In Maryland, it was Harrison and Tyler. Of the four Whig presidential candidates, only Harrison was on the ballot in enough states for it to be mathematically possible for him to win a majority in the Electoral College, and even then, it would have required him to win Van Buren's home state of New York.

=== Anti-Masonic Party nomination ===
After the negative views of Freemasonry among a large segment of the public began to wane in the mid-1830s, the Anti-Masonic Party began to disintegrate. Some of its members began moving to the Whig Party, which had a broader issue base than the Anti-Masons. The Whigs were also regarded as a better alternative to the Democrats.

A state convention for the Anti-Masonic Party was held in Harrisburg, Pennsylvania, from December 14 to 17, 1835, to choose presidential electors for the 1836 election. The convention unanimously nominated William Henry Harrison for president and Francis Granger for vice president. The Vermont state Anti-Masonic convention followed suit on February 24, 1836. Anti-Masonic leaders were unable to obtain assurance from Harrison that he was not a Mason, so they called a national convention. The second national Anti-Masonic nominating convention was held in Philadelphia on May 4, 1836. The meeting was divisive, but a majority of the delegates officially stated that the party was not sponsoring a national ticket for the presidential election of 1836 and proposed a meeting in 1837 to discuss the future of the party.

=== Nullifier Party nomination ===
The Nullifier Party had also begun to decline sharply since the previous election, after it became clear that the doctrine of nullification lacked sufficient support outside of the party's political base of South Carolina to ever make the Nullifiers more than a fringe party nationwide. Many party members began to drift towards the Democratic Party, but there was no question of the party endorsing Van Buren's bid for the presidency, as he and Calhoun were sworn enemies. Seeing little point in running their own ticket, Calhoun pushed the party into backing the White/Tyler ticket, as White had previously sided against Jackson during the Nullification Crisis.

== General election ==
=== Campaign ===
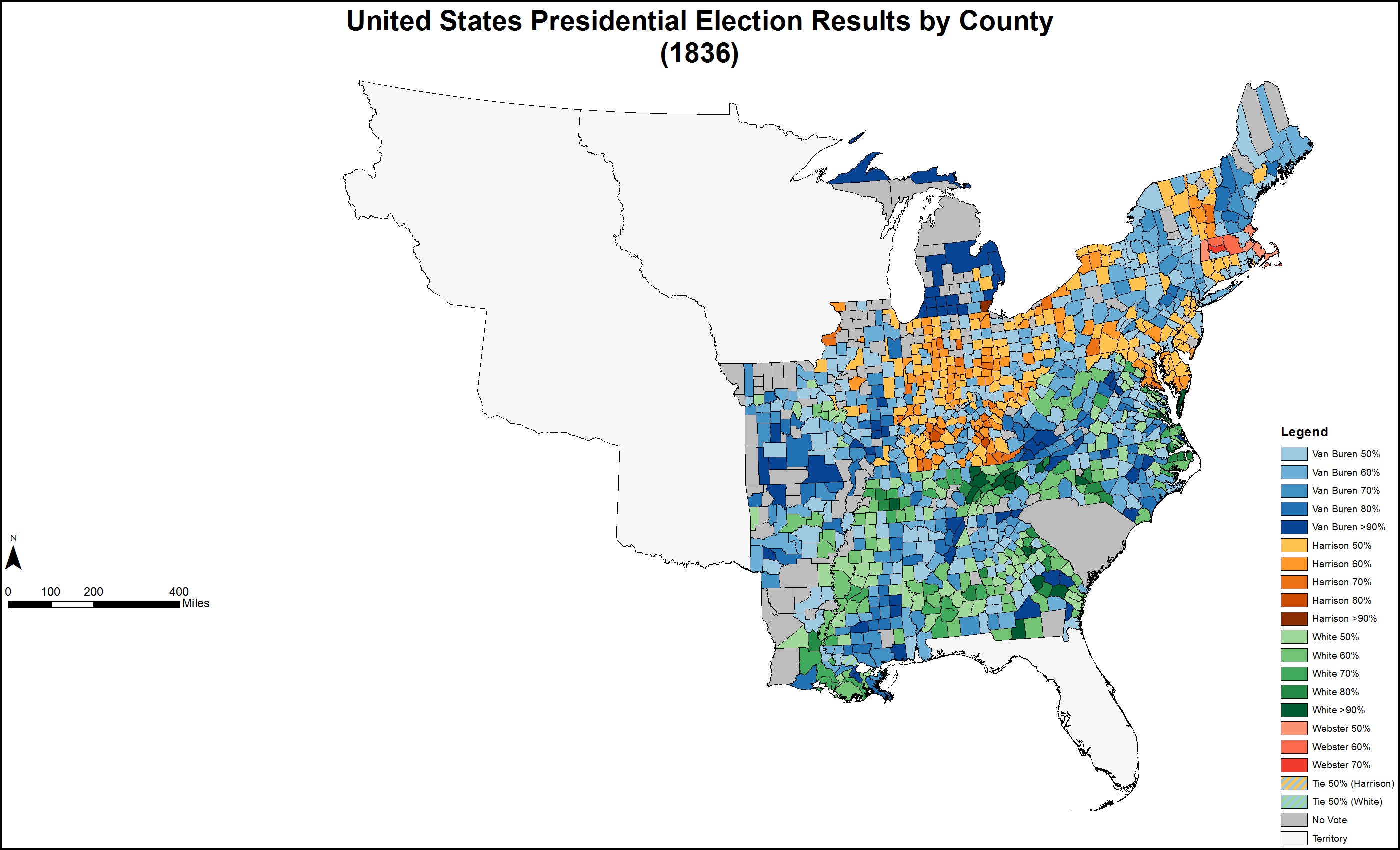
Results by county explicitly indicating the percentage of the winning candidate in each county. Shades of blue are for Van Buren (Democratic), shades of orange are for Harrison (Whig), shades of green are for White (Whig), and shades of red are for Webster (Whig).

Satire on the presidential campaign of 1836, portraying the contest as a boxing match between Democratic candidate Martin Van Buren and Whig candidate William Henry Harrison. The artist clearly favors Harrison.

In the aftermath of the Nat Turner's Rebellion and other events, slavery emerged as an increasingly prominent political issue. Calhoun attacked Van Buren, saying that he could not be trusted to protect Southern interests and accusing the sitting Vice President of affiliating with abolitionists. Van Buren defeated Harrison by a margin of 51.4% to 48.6% in the North, and he defeated White by a similar margin of 50.7% to 49.3% in the South.

=== Disputes ===
A dispute similar to that of Indiana in 1817 and Missouri in 1821 arose during the counting of the electoral votes. Michigan only became a state on January 26, 1837, and had cast its electoral votes for president before that date. Anticipating a challenge to the results, Congress resolved on February 4, 1837, that during the counting four days later the final tally would be read twice, once with Michigan and once without Michigan. The counting proceeded in accordance with the resolution. The dispute had no bearing on the final result: either way, Van Buren was elected, and either way no candidate had a majority for vice-president.

== Results ==
22.4% of the voting age population and 56.5% of eligible voters participated in the election.

The Whigs' strategy narrowly failed to prevent Van Buren's victory in the Electoral College, though he earned a somewhat lower share of the popular vote and fewer electoral votes than Andrew Jackson had in either of the previous two elections. The key state in this election was ultimately Pennsylvania, which Van Buren won from Harrison with a narrow majority of just 4,222 votes or 2.4%. Had Harrison won the state, Van Buren would have been left eight votes short of an Electoral College majority – despite receiving a majority (50.48%) in the popular vote – and the Whig goal to force the election into the House of Representatives (per the Twelfth Amendment to the United States Constitution) would have succeeded. Thus, the 11.8% difference between the margin in the tipping-point state of Pennsylvania and the margin in the national popular vote is the largest gap in American history. Van Buren won Arkansas, Connecticut, Louisiana, Mississippi, and Rhode Island by only 2,569 votes total; had the leading Whig won each of those states, Van Buren would have been short of the necessary 148 electoral votes.

In a contingent election, the House would have been required to choose between Van Buren, Harrison, and White as the three candidates with the most electoral votes. Jacksonians controlled enough state delegations (14 out of 26) and enough Senate seats (31 out of 52) to win both the presidency and the vice presidency in a contingent election.

This was the last election in which the Democrats won Connecticut, Rhode Island, and North Carolina until 1852. This was also the only election where South Carolina voted for the Whigs, and the last time it voted against the Democrats until 1868. It was also the last time that a Democrat was elected to the U.S. presidency succeeding a Democrat who had served two terms as U.S. president.

Presidential candidate	Party	Home state	Popular vote^{(a)}		Electoral vote
Presidential candidate	Party	Home state	Count	Percentage	Electoral vote
Martin Van Buren	Democratic	New York	764,176	50.83%	170
William Henry Harrison	Whig	Ohio	550,816	36.63%	73
Hugh Lawson White	Whig	Tennessee	146,107	9.72%	26
Daniel Webster	Whig	Massachusetts	41,201	2.74%	14
Willie Person Mangum	Whig	North Carolina	—^{(b)}	—	11
Other			1,234	0.08%	0
Total			1,503,534	100.0%	294
Needed to win					148

Source (Popular Vote): Leip, David. "1836 Presidential Election Results". Dave Leip's Atlas of U.S. Presidential Elections. Source (Electoral Vote): "Electoral College Box Scores 1789–1996". National Archives and Records Administration.

^{(a)} The popular vote figures exclude South Carolina where the electors were chosen by the state legislature rather than by popular vote.
^{(b)} Mangum received his electoral votes from South Carolina where the electors were chosen by the state legislatures rather than by popular vote.

Popular vote
Van Buren	50.83%
Harrison	36.63%
White	9.72%
Webster	2.74%
Others	0.08%

Electoral vote (president)
Van Buren	57.82%
Harrison	24.83%
White	8.84%
Webster	4.76%
Mangum	3.74%

Electoral vote (vice president)
Johnson	50.00%
Granger	26.19%
Tyler	15.99%
Smith	7.82%

Vice presidential candidate	Party	State	Electoral vote
Richard Mentor Johnson	Democratic	Kentucky	147
Francis Granger	Whig	New York	77
John Tyler	Whig	Virginia	47
William Smith	Democratic	South Carolina	23
Total			294
Needed to win			148

Source: "Electoral College Box Scores 1789–1996". National Archives and Records Administration.

=== Geography of results ===
==== Cartographic gallery ====
Electoral College map (president)

Electoral College map (vice president)

Map of presidential election results by county, shaded according to winning candidate's percentage of the vote

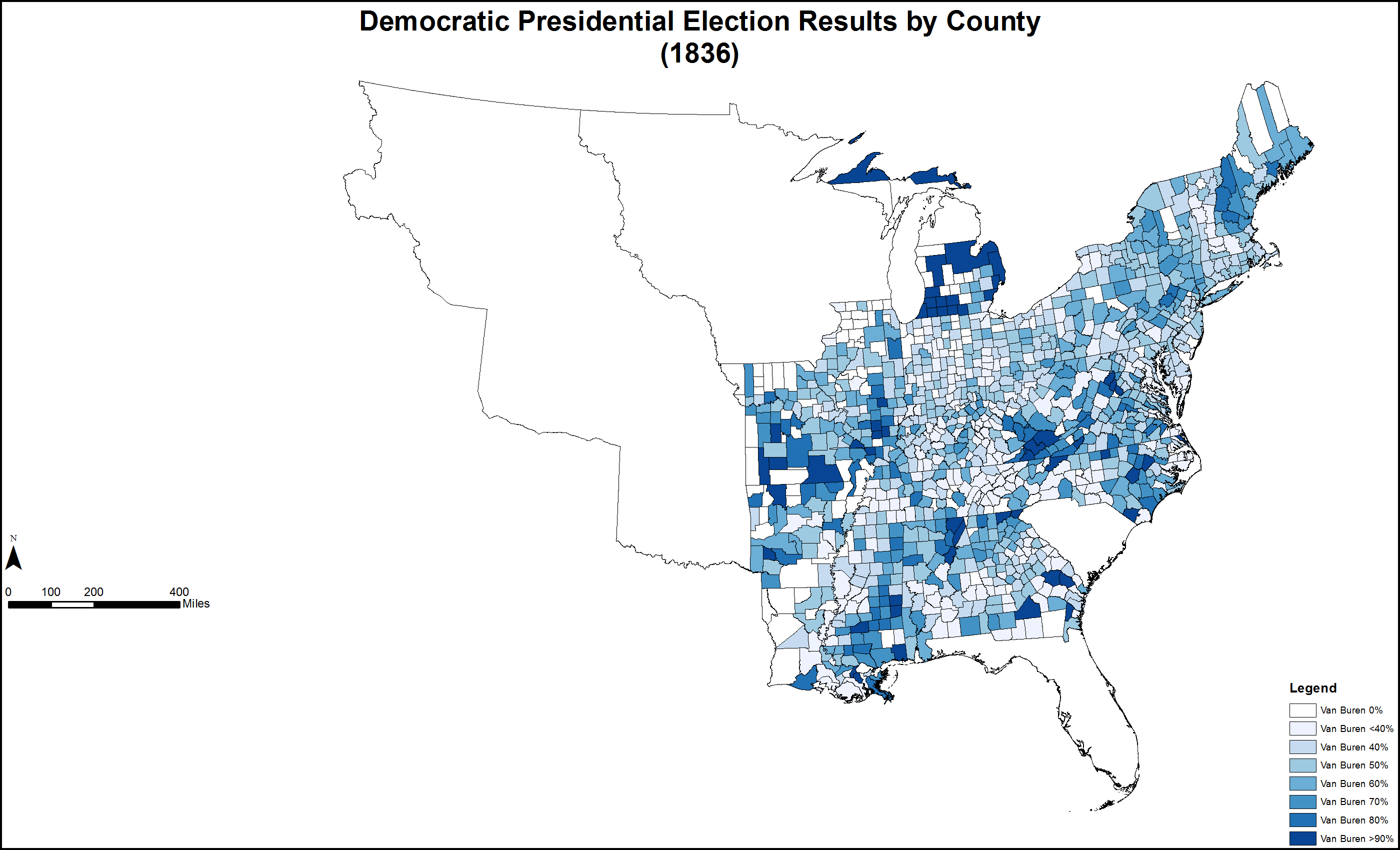
Map of Democratic presidential election results by county

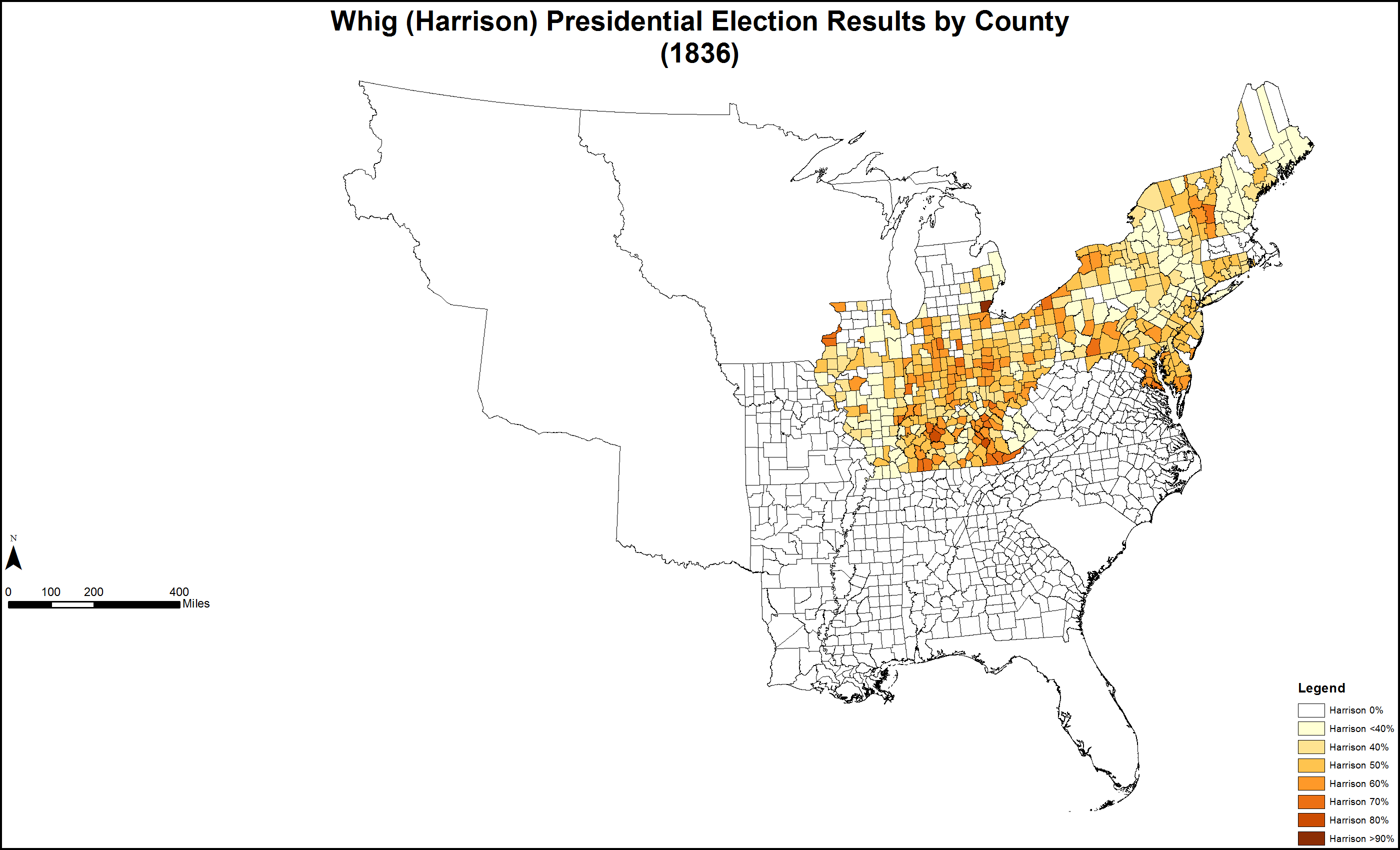
Map of Harrison Whig presidential election results by county

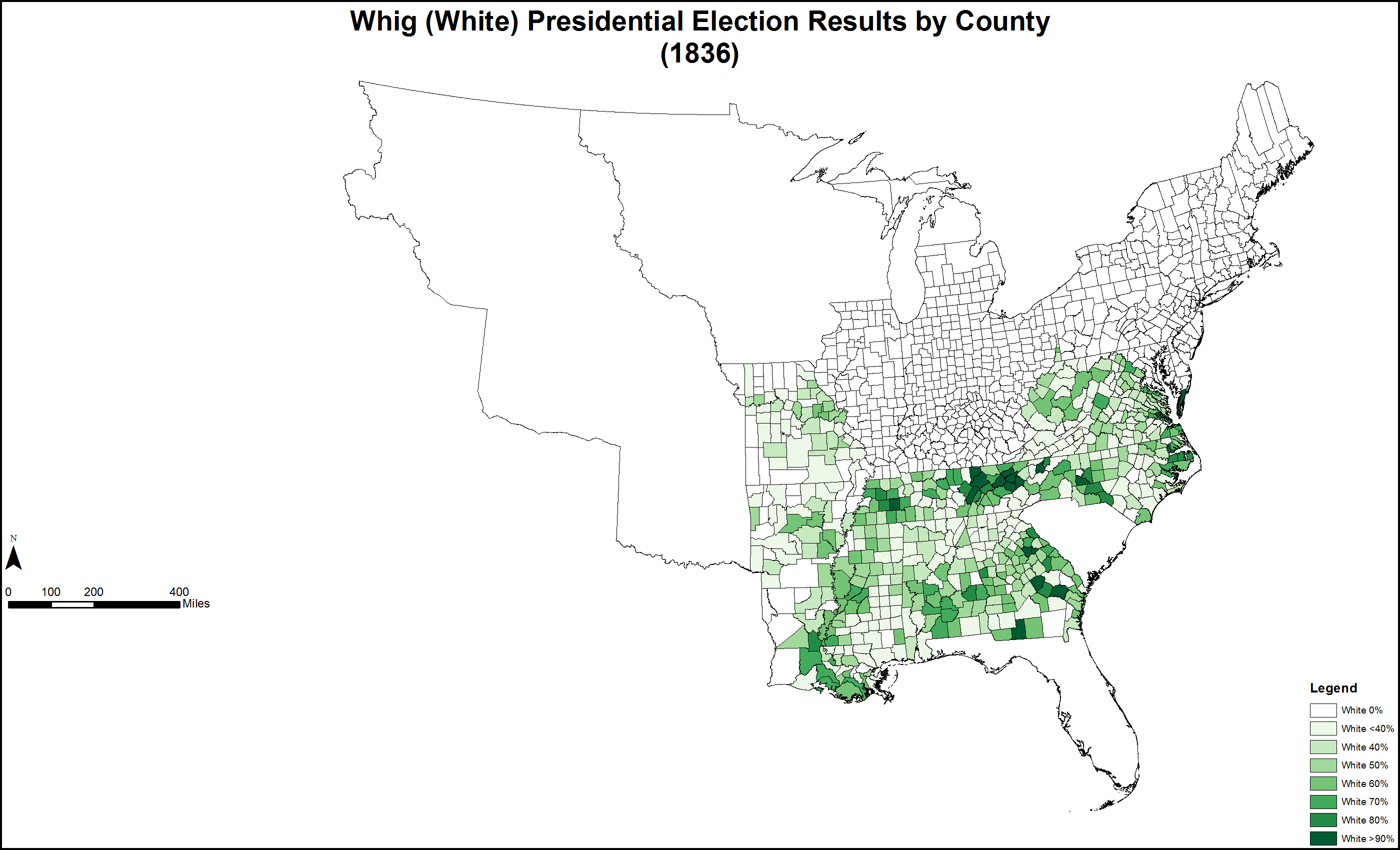
Map of White Whig presidential election results by county

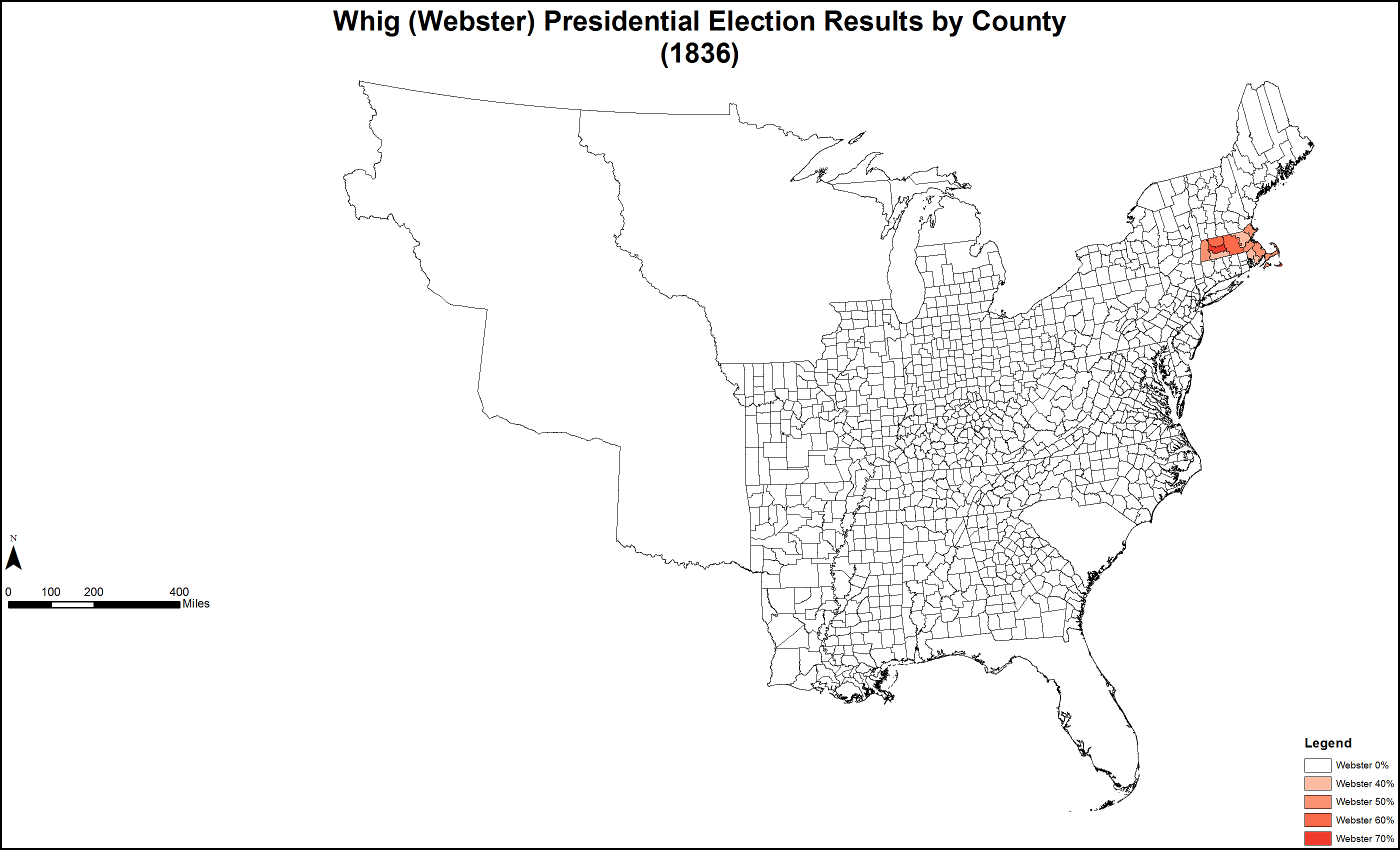
Map of Webster Whig presidential election results by county

== Results by state ==
Source: Data from Walter Dean Burnham, Presidential ballots, 1836-1892 (Johns Hopkins University Press, 1955) pp 247–57.

States/districts won by Van Buren/Johnson
States/districts won by a Whig candidate

		Martin Van Buren Democratic			William H. Harrison Whig			Hugh L. White Whig			Daniel Webster Whig			Willie Person Mangum Whig	Margin		Total	
State	electoral votes	Votes cast	%	electoral votes	Votes cast	%	electoral votes	Votes cast	%	electoral votes	Votes cast	%	electoral votes	electoral votes	#	%	#	
Alabama	7	20,638	55.34	7	no ballots			16,658	44.66	0	no ballots			no ballots	3,980	10.68	37,296	AL
Arkansas	3	2,380	64.08	3	no ballots			1,334	35.92	0	no ballots			no ballots	1,046	28.16	3,714	AR
Connecticut	8	19,294	50.65	8	18,799	49.35	0	no ballots			no ballots			no ballots	495	1.30	38,093	CT
Delaware	3	4,154	46.70	0	4,736	53.24	3	no ballots			no ballots			no ballots	-582	-6.54	8,895	DE
Georgia	11	22,778	48.20	0	no ballots			24,481	51.80	11	no ballots			no ballots	-1,703	-3.60	47,259	GA
Illinois	5	18,369	54.69	5	15,220	45.31	0	no ballots			no ballots			no ballots	3,149	9.38	33,589	IL
Indiana	9	32,478	44.03	0	41,281	55.97	9	no ballots			no ballots			no ballots	-8,803	-11.94	73,759	IN
Kentucky	15	33,229	47.41	0	36,861	52.59	15	no ballots			no ballots			no ballots	-3,632	-5.18	70,090	KY
Louisiana	5	3,842	51.74	5	no ballots			3,583	48.26	0	no ballots			no ballots	259	3.48	7,425	LA
Maine	10	22,825	58.92	10	14,803	38.21	0	no ballots			no ballots			no ballots	8,022	20.71	38,740	ME
Maryland	10	22,267	46.27	0	25,852	53.73	10	no ballots			no ballots			no ballots	-3,585	-7.46	48,119	MD
Massachusetts	14	33,486	44.81	0	no ballots			no ballots			41,201	55.13	14	no ballots	-7,715	-10.32	74,687	MA
Michigan	3	7,122	56.22	3	5,545	43.78	0	no ballots			no ballots			no ballots	1,577	12.44	12,667	MI
Mississippi	4	10,297	51.28	4	no ballots			9,782	48.72	0	no ballots			no ballots	515	2.56	20,079	MS
Missouri	4	10,995	59.98	4	no ballots			7,337	40.02	0	no ballots			no ballots	3,658	19.96	18,332	MO
New Hampshire	7	18,697	75.01	7	6,228	24.99	0	no ballots			no ballots			no ballots	12,469	50.02	24,925	NH
New Jersey	8	25,592	49.47	0	26,137	50.53	8	no ballots			no ballots			no ballots	-545	-1.06	51,729	NJ
New York	42	166,795	54.63	42	138,548	45.37	0	no ballots			no ballots			no ballots	28,247	9.26	305,343	NY
North Carolina	15	26,631	53.10	15	no ballots			23,521	46.90	0	no ballots			no ballots	3,110	6.20	50,153	NC
Ohio	21	96,238	47.56	0	104,958	51.87	21	no ballots			no ballots			no ballots	-8,720	-4.31	202,333	OH
Pennsylvania	30	91,457	51.18	30	87,235	48.82	0	no ballots			no ballots			no ballots	4,222	2.36	178,692	PA
Rhode Island	4	2,964	52.24	4	2,710	47.76	0	no ballots			no ballots			no ballots	254	4.48	5,674	RI
South Carolina	11	no popular vote			no popular vote			no popular vote			no popular vote			11	-	-	0	SC
Tennessee	15	26,170	42.08	0	no ballots			36,027	57.92	15	no ballots			no ballots	-9,857	-15.84	62,197	TN
Vermont	7	14,037	40.07	0	20,994	59.93	7	no ballots			no ballots			no ballots	-6,957	-19.86	35,031	VT
Virginia	23	30,556	56.64	23	no ballots			23,384	43.35	0	no ballots			no ballots	7,172	13.29	53,945	VA
TOTALS:	294	763,291	50.79	170	549,907	36.59	73	146,107	9.72	26	41,201	2.74	14	11	213,384	14.20	1,502,811	US
TO WIN:	148																	

=== States that flipped from National Republican to Whig ===
- Delaware
- Kentucky
- Maryland
- Massachusetts

=== States that flipped from National Republican to Democratic ===
- Connecticut
- Rhode Island

=== States that flipped from Anti-Masonic to Whig ===
- Vermont

=== States that flipped from Democratic to Whig ===
- Georgia
- Indiana
- New Jersey
- Ohio
- Tennessee

=== States that flipped from Nullifer to Whig ===
- South Carolina

=== Close states ===
States where the margin of victory was under 5%:

1. New Jersey 1.06% (545 votes)
2. Connecticut 1.3% (495 votes)
3. Pennsylvania 2.36% (4,222 votes) (tipping point state for a Van Buren victory)
4. Mississippi 2.56% (515 votes)
5. Louisiana 3.48% (259 votes)
6. Georgia 3.6% (1,703 votes)
7. Ohio 4.31% (8,720 votes)
8. Rhode Island 4.48% (254 votes)

States where the margin of victory was under 10%:

1. Kentucky 5.18% (3,632 votes)
2. North Carolina 6.2% (3,110 votes)
3. Delaware 6.54% (582 votes)
4. Maryland 7.46% (3,585 votes)
5. New York 9.26% (28,247 votes) (tipping point state for a Harrison victory)
6. Illinois 9.38% (3,149 votes)

=== Breakdown by ticket ===
Candidate	Total	Martin Van Buren Democratic	William H. Harrison Whig	Hugh L. White Whig	Daniel Webster Whig	Willie P. Mangum Whig
Electoral Votes for President	294	170	73	26	14	11
For Vice President, Richard Mentor Johnson	147	147				
For Vice President, Francis Granger	77		63		14	
For Vice President, John Tyler	47		10	26		11
For Vice President, William Smith	23	23				

=== 1837 contingent election for vice president ===
Virginia's 23 electors, who were all pledged to Van Buren and his running mate Richard Mentor Johnson, became faithless electors due to dissension related to Johnson's interracial relationship with a slave and refused to vote for Johnson, instead casting their vice-presidential votes for former South Carolina senator William Smith.

This left Johnson one electoral vote short of an Electoral College majority. Since no vice presidential candidate received a majority of electoral votes, for the only time in American history, the Senate decided the vice presidential race in a contingent election.

On February 8, 1837, Johnson was elected on the first ballot by a vote of 33 to 16; the vote proceeded largely along party lines, albeit with three Whigs voting for Johnson, one Democrat voting for Granger, and three abstentions (Hugh L. White declined to vote out of respect for his own running-mate, John Tyler, while the two Nullifier Party senators refused to back either candidate).

1837 Contingent United States vice presidential election
February 8, 1837
Party	Candidate	Votes	%
Democratic	Richard M. Johnson	33	63.46%
Whig	Francis Granger	16	30.77%
—	Not voting	3	5.77%
Total membership		52	100
Votes necessary		27	>50
Members voting for: Johnson / Granger; ■ Thomas H. Benton of Missouri ■ John Black of Mississippi ■ Bedford Brown of North Carolina ■ James Buchanan of Pennsylvania ■ Alfred Cuthbert of Georgia ■ Judah Dana of Maine ■ William Lee D. Ewing of Illinois ■ William S. Fulton of Arkansas ■ Felix Grundy of Tennessee ■ William Hendricks of Indiana ■ Henry Hubbard of New Hampshire ■ William R. King of Alabama ■ John P. King of Georgia ■ Lewis F. Linn of Missouri ■ Lucius Lyon of Michigan ■ Samuel McKean of Pennsylvania ■ Gabriel Moore of Alabama ■ Thomas Morris of Ohio ■ Alexandre Mouton of Louisiana ■ Robert C. Nicholas of Louisiana ■ John M. Niles of Connecticut ■ John Norvell of Michigan ■ John Page of New Hampshire ■ Richard E. Parker of Virginia ■ William C. Rives of Virginia ■ John M. Robinson of Illinois ■ John Ruggles of Maine ■ Ambrose H. Sevier of Arkansas ■ Robert Strange of North Carolina ■ Nathaniel P. Tallmadge of New York ■ John Tipton of Indiana ■ Robert J. Walker of Mississippi ■ Silas Wright of New York / ■ Richard H. Bayard of Delaware ■ Henry Clay of Kentucky ■ Thomas Clayton of Delaware ■ John J. Crittenden of Kentucky ■ John Davis of Massachusetts ■ Thomas Ewing of Ohio ■ Joseph Kent of Maryland ■ Nehemiah R. Knight of Rhode Island ■ Samuel Prentiss of Vermont ■ Asher Robbins of Rhode Island ■ Samuel L. Southard of New Jersey ■ John Selby Spence of Maryland ■ Benjamin Swift of Vermont ■ Gideon Tomlinson of Connecticut ■ Garret D. Wall of New Jersey ■ Daniel Webster of Massachusetts; Members not voting: ■ John C. Calhoun of South Carolina ■ William C. Preston of South Carolina ■ Hugh L. White of Tennessee Sources:

=== Electoral college selection ===
Method of choosing electors	State(s)
Each Elector appointed by state legislature	South Carolina
Each Elector chosen by voters statewide	(all other States)

== See also ==
- Inauguration of Martin Van Buren
- History of the United States (1789–1849)
- 1836–37 United States House of Representatives elections
- 1836–37 United States Senate elections

== Works cited ==
- Abramson, Paul; Aldrich, John; Rohde, David (1995). Change and Continuity in the 1992 Elections. CQ Press. ISBN 0871878399.
