= 1835 Democratic National Convention =

U.S. political event held in Baltimore, Maryland

- 1836 presidential election
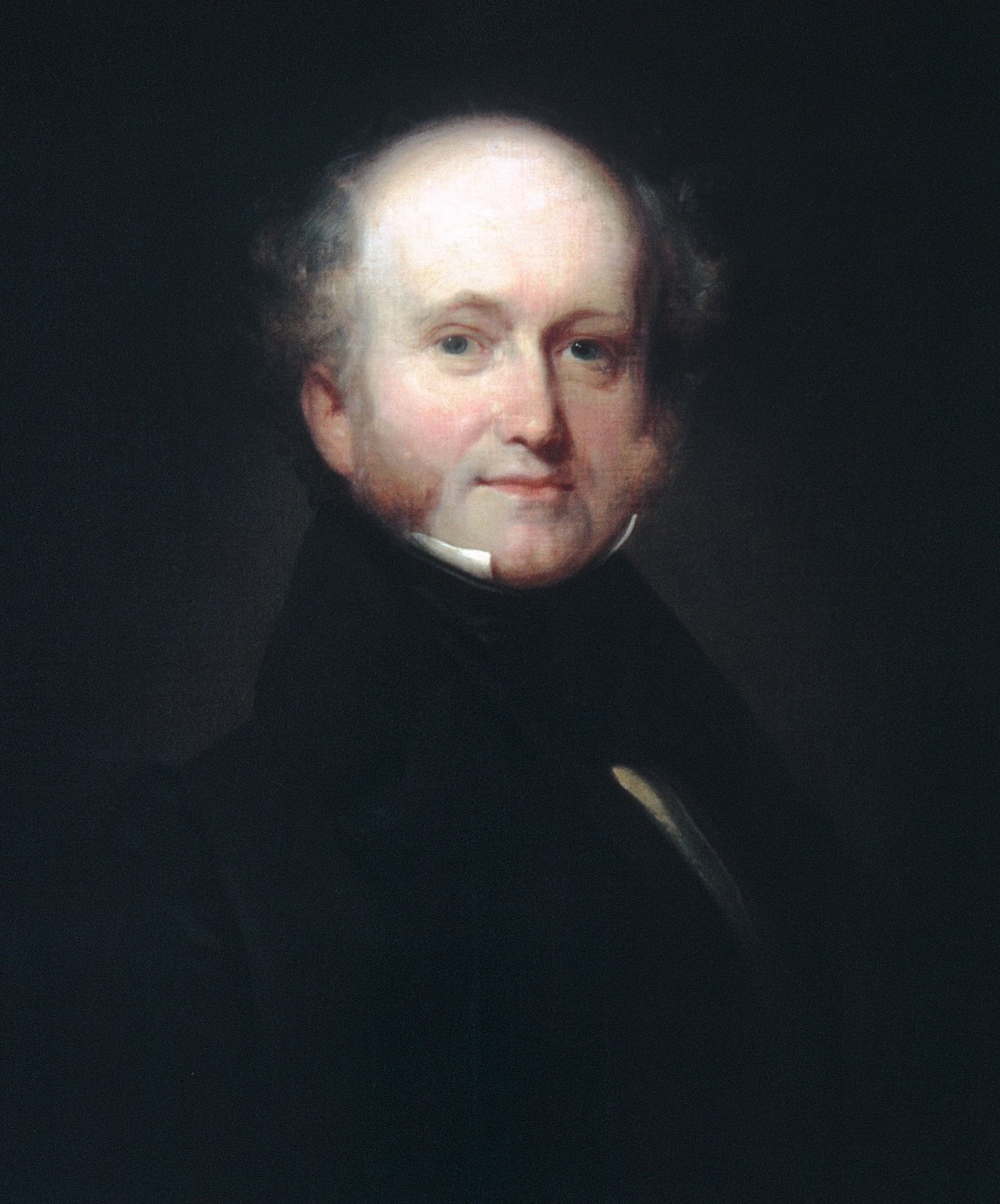
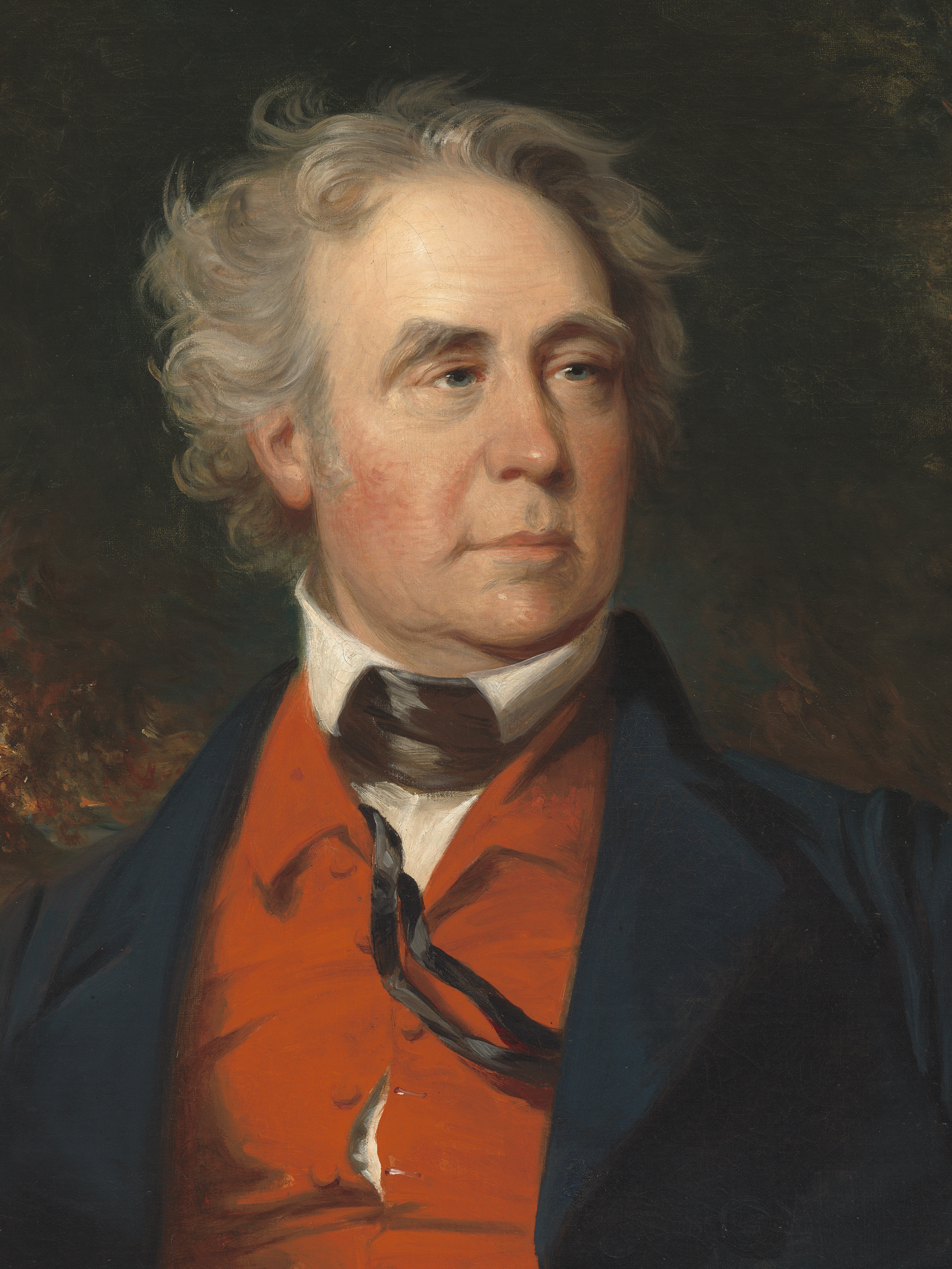
- Nominees; Van Buren and Johnson

Convention
- Date(s): May 20–22, 1835
- City: Baltimore, Maryland
- Venue: Fourth Presbyterian Church

Candidates
- Presidential nominee: Martin Van Buren of New York
- Vice-presidential nominee: Richard M. Johnson of Kentucky

The 1835 Democratic National Convention was held from May 20 to May 22, 1835, in Baltimore, Maryland. The convention nominated incumbent Vice President Martin Van Buren for president and Representative Richard Mentor Johnson of Kentucky for vice president.

Former Speaker of the House Andrew Stevenson served as the convention chairman. With the support of President Andrew Jackson, Van Buren won the presidential nomination unanimously. Johnson narrowly won the two-thirds majority necessary for the vice presidential nomination, overcoming a challenge from William Cabell Rives of Virginia. The Democratic ticket of Van Buren and Johnson went on to win the 1836 presidential election.

== Background ==
On February 23, 1835, President Andrew Jackson wrote to James Gwin of Tennessee and claimed a preference for someone who would "most likely to be the choice of the great body of republicans" in regard to his successor. He expressed the desire to hold another national convention to nominate candidates for the presidency and vice presidency. He instructed Gwin to show the letter to the editor of the Nashville Republican. The newspaper later reprinted the letter.

== Proceedings ==
Andrew Stevenson was selected as temporary and then permanent chair of the convention. Six vice presidents and four secretaries were selected as well.

A dispute existed over which group would represent Pennsylvania at the convention. The convention decided to have the two groups combine and divide the state's votes between themselves.

Alabama, Illinois, South Carolina, and Tennessee did not send any delegates to the convention. Tennessee was represented by one person who was in Baltimore on business and they were given the voting power of fifteen people. The other three states had no representatives at the convention.

Delegates
State	Total delegates	Voting power
Arkansas Territory	1	0
Connecticut	6	8
Delaware	14	3
Georgia	3	11
Indiana	11	9
Kentucky	13	15
Louisiana	3	5
Maine	16	10
Maryland	188	10
Massachusetts	18	14
Michigan Territory	2	0
Mississippi	2	4
Missouri	2	4
New Hampshire	20	7
New Jersey	63	8
New York	42	42
North Carolina	15	15
Ohio	18	21
Pennsylvania	60	30
Rhode Island	8	4
Tennessee	1	15
Vermont	7	7
Virginia	100	23

== Presidential nomination ==
=== Presidential candidates ===
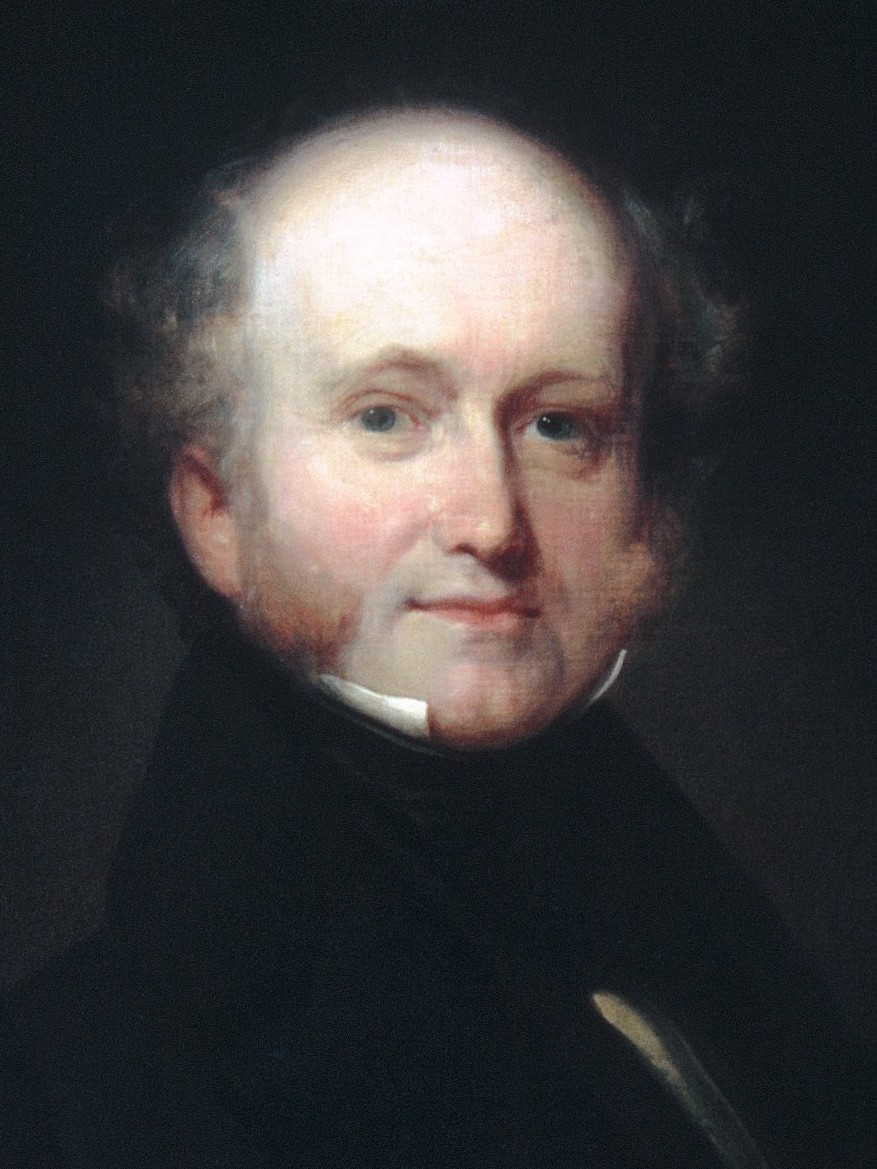
Vice President
Martin Van Buren
of New York

President Jackson had long planned for Vice President Martin Van Buren to succeed him, and Van Buren was the unanimous choice of the delegates for the presidency.

Presidential Balloting
Candidate	1st
Van Buren	265
Not Represented	23

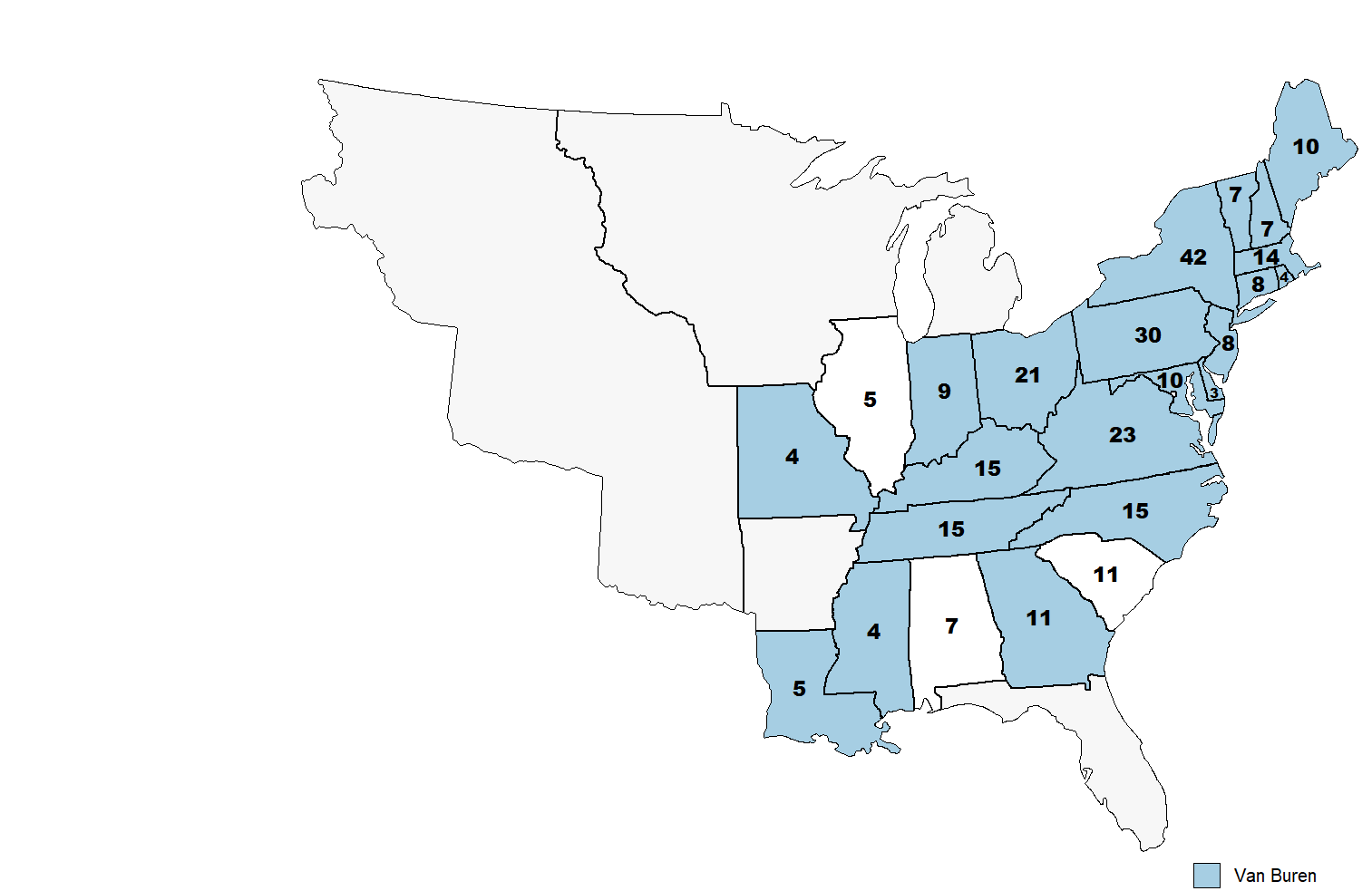
1st Presidential Ballot

== Vice Presidential nomination ==
=== Vice Presidential candidates ===
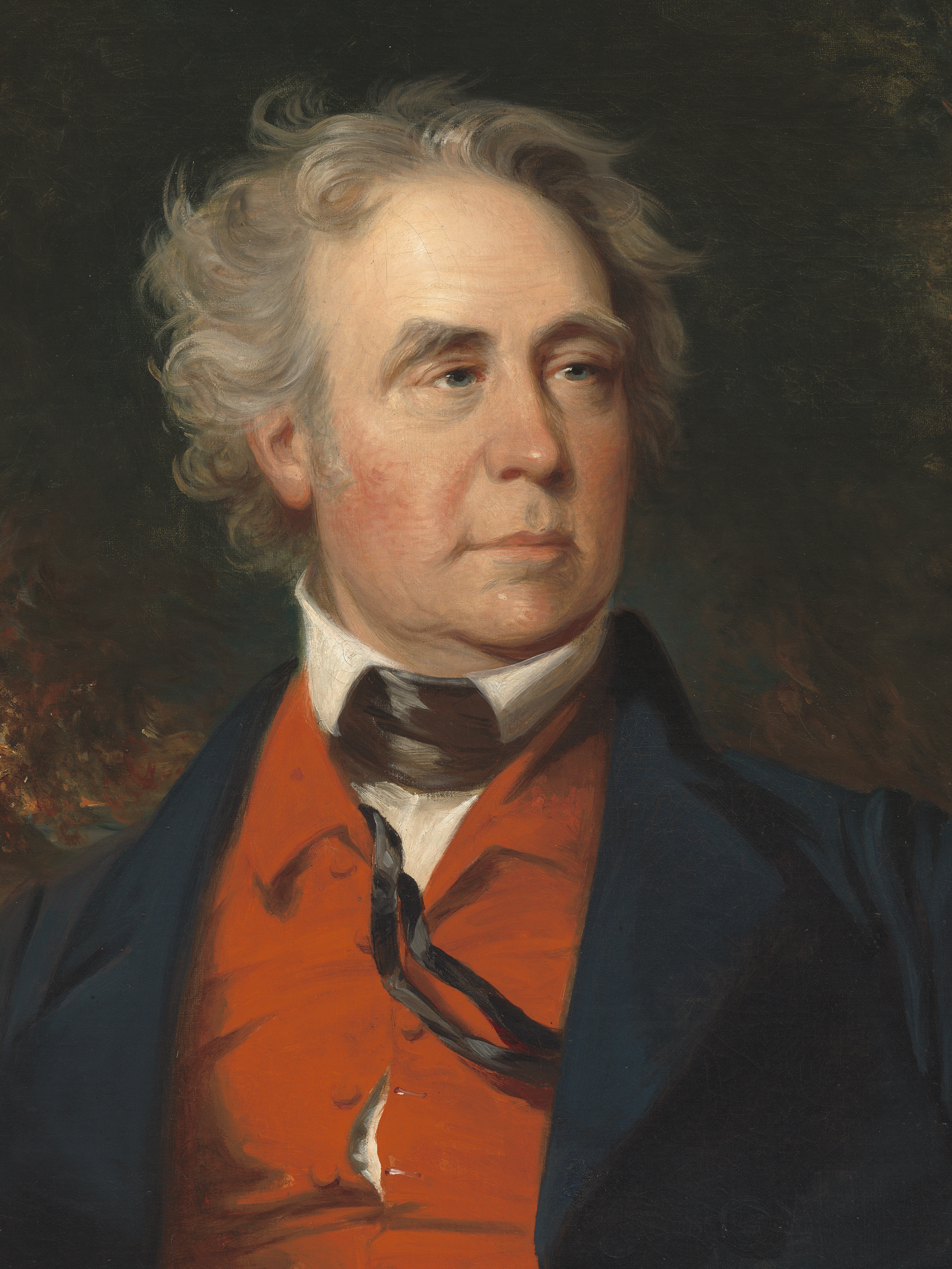
Representative
Richard M. Johnson
of Kentucky

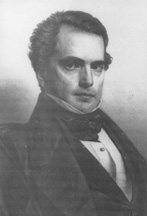
Former Senator
William C. Rives
of Virginia

Jackson and other major Democrats had settled on Richard Mentor Johnson, a Kentucky representative who had fought in the War of 1812, as Van Buren's running mate, but many Virginia Democrats backed William Cabell Rives, the former Ambassador to France.

A man from Tennessee, Edward Rucker, who was present at the convention but was not sent as a delegate, cast all 15 votes Tennessee was entitled to for Van Buren, and for Johnson for the vice presidential nomination. Johnson was nominated for vice president after winning one vote more than the two-thirds majority required.

The delegation of Virginia declared that it had no confidence in Johnson's character and principles, and would not support him.

Vice Presidential Balloting
Candidate	1st	Percentage
Johnson	178	67.17%
Rives	87	32.83%
Not Represented	23	7.99%

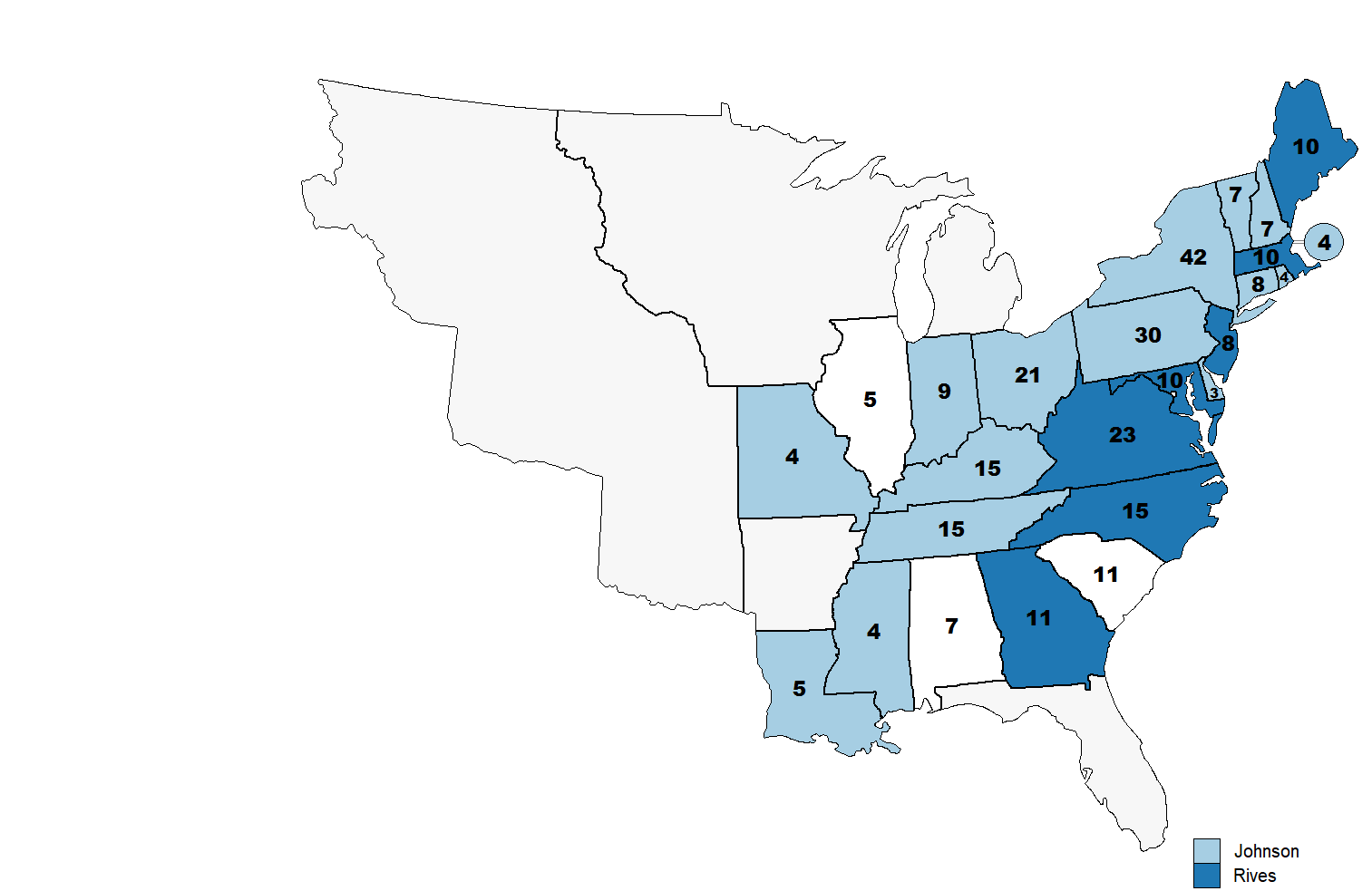
1st Vice Presidential Ballot

Letters went out on May 23 from the convention president and vice presidents asking for the acceptance of the nominations by the nominees. Van Buren replied and accepted the nomination on May 29; Johnson, likewise on June 9.

== General election ==
The Whigs did not put forward a national ticket nominated by national convention. Van Buren defeated his many competitors for the presidency in the general election. While the electors of Virginia supported Van Buren for the presidency, they cast their vice presidential votes for William Smith. Consequently, Johnson received a plurality, but not a majority, of the electoral votes for the vice presidency. In the subsequent contingent election in the Senate, Johnson was elected vice president.

== See also ==
- History of the United States Democratic Party
- List of Democratic National Conventions
- U.S. presidential nomination convention
- 1836 United States presidential election

== Works cited ==
- Bain, Richard; Parris, Judith (1973). Convention Decisions and Voting Records. Brookings Institution. ISBN 0815707681.

Preceded by 1832; Baltimore, Maryland	Democratic National Conventions	Succeeded by 1840; Baltimore, Maryland
