= Robert Wood (American politician) =

American politician

Robert Beede Wood (September 18, 1885 – July 15, 1964) was an American politician who was a member of the Wisconsin State Assembly.

== Early life ==
Wood was born on September 18, 1885, in what is now Lake Preston, South Dakota. At the time it was located in the Dakota Territory. He held a number of jobs before eventually becoming a bank president.

== Political career ==
He was a member of the Assembly during the 1925 and 1927 sessions. Other positions he held included village president (similar to mayor) and school board member. He was a Republican.

== Personal life and death ==
Wood died on July 15, 1964, at the age of 78.
