= Ora McMurry =

United States Army Air Service officer

Ora McMurry was an American officer in the United States Army Air Service during World War I. He was twice awarded with the Distinguished Service Cross.

His first award citation reads:

The President of the United States of America, authorized by Act of Congress, July 9, 1918, takes pleasure in presenting the Distinguished Service Cross to First Lieutenant (Air Service) Ora R. McMurry, United States Army Air Service, for extraordinary heroism in action while serving with 49th Aero Squadron, 2d Pursuit Group, U.S. Army Air Service, A.E.F., near Romagne, France, 4 October 1918. Lieutenant McMurry was a member of a patrol of seven machines which attacked 17 enemy Fokkers. After shooting down one of the enemy, this officer returned to the fight and shot down another.

His second award citation reads:

The President of the United States of America, authorized by Act of Congress, July 9, 1918, takes pleasure in presenting a Bronze Oak Leaf Cluster in lieu of a Second Award of the Distinguished Service Cross to First Lieutenant (Air Service) Ora R. McMurry, United States Army Air Service, for extraordinary heroism in action while serving with 49th Aero Squadron, 2d Pursuit Group, U.S. Army Air Service, A.E.F., near Tages and La Croix aux Bois, France, 30 October 1918. After becoming separated from his patrol because of motor trouble, this officer encountered and attacked five enemy planes (Fokker), and succeeded in shooting down one of them.

McMurry was born in Lake Preston, South Dakota, his official residence was listed as Evansville, Wisconsin.
