= Lake Preston (South Dakota) =

Lake in the state of South Dakota, United States

- Location within South Dakota Location within the United States
- Location: Kingsbury County, South Dakota
- Coordinates: 44°22′49″N 97°19′29″W
- Basin countries: United States
- Settlements: City of Lake Preston

Lake Preston is a lake located adjacent to and northeast of the city of Lake Preston, South Dakota. The lake is near and directly north of Lake Whitewood.

The lake has the name of William C. Preston, a United States Senator from South Carolina.

== See also ==
- List of South Dakota lakes
