= William C. Preston =

American politician (1794–1860)

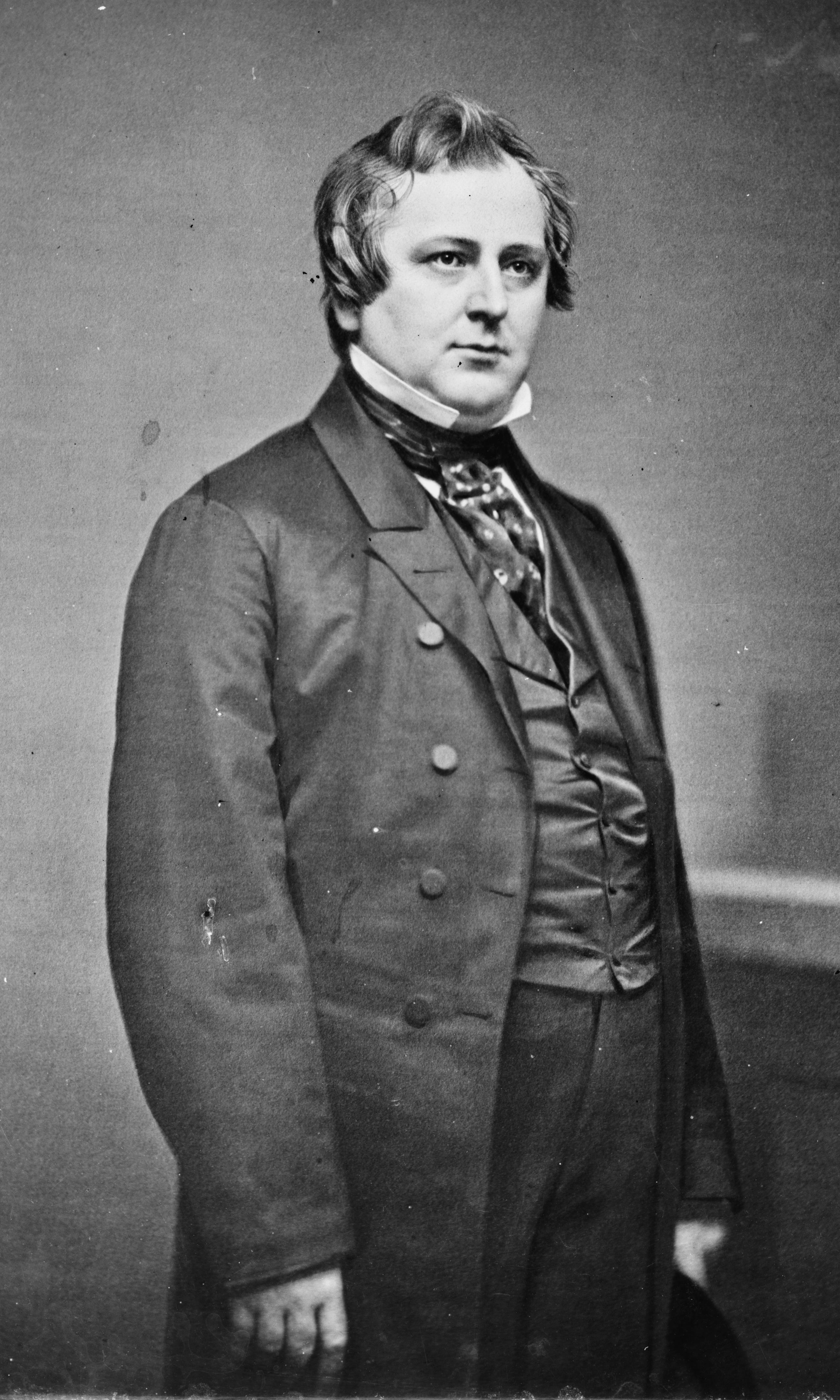
- Preston, 1855–1860

United States Senator from South Carolina
- In office November 26, 1833 – November 29, 1842
- Preceded by: Stephen D. Miller
- Succeeded by: George McDuffie

Member of the South Carolina House of Representatives from Richland District
- In office November 21, 1828 – November 26, 1833

Personal details
- Born: William Campbell Preston; December 27, 1794 Philadelphia, Pennsylvania, US
- Died: May 22, 1860 (aged 65) Columbia, South Carolina, US
- Party: Nullifier, Whig
- Education: Washington University; South Carolina College; University of Edinburgh
- Profession: Politician, lawyer
- Committees: Committee on the Library of the Whig Party (1837-November 29, 1842), Committee on Military Affairs of the Whig Party (1837- November 29, 1842)

William Campbell Preston (December 27, 1794 – May 22, 1860) was a senator from the United States and a member of the Nullifier, and later Whig Parties. He was also the cousin of William Ballard Preston, William Preston and Angelica Singleton Van Buren. He first married Maria Eliza Coalter in 1819, then Louisa Penelope Davis after Maria's death. Preston was a slaveowner and vocal opponent of abolitionism.

== Early life ==
Born in Philadelphia, Pennsylvania, he was the son of Francis Preston, a well-to-do businessman, and Sarah Buchanan Campbell, daughter of Gen. William Campbell. During his childhood he was educated by private tutors, then enrolled in Washington University (later known as Washington and Lee University) in Lexington, Virginia. He then transferred to and graduated from South Carolina College (later known as the University of South Carolina) in Columbia in 1812, where he was a member of the Euphradian Society.

== Career ==
After traveling and studying around Europe, Preston studied law at the University of Edinburgh in Scotland. He sailed back to the States in 1819 and was admitted to the bar of Virginia in 1820. He practiced law there for two years. He then moved to Columbia, South Carolina in 1822 and ran unsuccessfully for election to the Twenty-Second Congress. He was, however, elected to the South Carolina House of Representatives and served from 1828 to 1834. He was then elected in 1833 as a Nullifier to the United States Senate to fill the vacancy after the resignation of Stephen D. Miller. During his first year in the Senate, his oratorical gifts led the Whig leadership to give him a prominent role in the effort to censure Andrew Jackson, elevating Preston "far in advance of most of his colleagues, and side by side with Clay, Webster, Calhoun, and Clayton." Preston was then reelected as a Whig in 1837 and served until his resignation on November 29, 1842. During that time he served as the chairman for the Committee on the Library and the Committee on Military Affairs. Preston was the only Whig to serve as a senator from South Carolina. After his resignation, Preston returned to practicing law and served as president of South Carolina College from 1845 until 1851, when he resigned due to poor health. He died in Columbia, South Carolina. He was buried in the Trinity Episcopal Churchyard.

He is the namesake of Lake Preston, in South Dakota. Preston College at the University of South Carolina is named in his honor; in July 2021, the university's Presidential Commission on University History recommended renaming the college.

== Notes ==
U.S. Senate
Preceded by Stephen D. Miller	U.S. senator (Class 3) from South Carolina; 1833–1842; Served alongside: John C. Calhoun	Succeeded by George McDuffie
Academic offices
Preceded by Robert Henry	President of University of South Carolina; 1845–1851	Succeeded by Francis Lieber as President pro tem
