= Preston Lake (Renville County, Minnesota) =

Lake in the state of Minnesota, United States

- Location within Minnesota
- Location: Renville County, Minnesota
- Coordinates: 44°46′58″N 94°32′18″W
- Type: lake

Preston Lake is a lake in Renville County, in the U.S. state of Minnesota.

Preston Lake bears the name of a pioneer settler.

== See also ==
- List of lakes in Minnesota
