= Lake Preston, South Dakota =

- City
- Location in Kingsbury County and the state of South Dakota
- Coordinates: 44°21′41″N 97°22′33″W
- Country: United States
- State: South Dakota
- County: Kingsbury
- Incorporated: 1906

Area
  - Total: 0.76 sq mi (1.97 km^{2})
  - Land: 0.76 sq mi (1.97 km^{2})
  - Water: 0 sq mi (0.00 km^{2})
- Elevation: 1,719 ft (524 m)

Population (2020)
  - Total: 589
  - Density: 775.8/sq mi (299.55/km^{2})
- Time zone: UTC-6 (Central (CST))
  - Summer (DST): UTC-5 (CDT)
- ZIP codes: 57233, 57249
- Area code: 605
- FIPS code: 46-35500
- GNIS feature ID: 1267452
- Website: lakeprestonsd.com

Lake Preston is a city in Kingsbury County, South Dakota, United States. As of the 2020 census, Lake Preston had a population of 589.

== History ==
A post office called Preston was established in 1879, and the name was changed to Lake Preston in 1882. The town site was platted in 1881. It was located in the Dakota Territory at the time. The city took its name from nearby Lake Preston.

== Geography ==
According to the United States Census Bureau, the city has a total area of 0.76 square miles (1.97 km^{2}), all land.

== Demographics ==
Historical population
Census	Pop.	Note	%±
1890	337		—
1900	706		109.5%
1910	1,007		42.6%
1920	1,008		0.1%
1930	944		−6.3%
1940	886		−6.1%
1950	957		8.0%
1960	955		−0.2%
1970	812		−15.0%
1980	789		−2.8%
1990	663		−16.0%
2000	737		11.2%
2010	599		−18.7%
2020	589		−1.7%
U.S. Decennial Census

=== 2020 census ===
As of the 2020 census, Lake Preston had a population of 589. The median age was 47.9 years. 21.2% of residents were under the age of 18 and 25.3% of residents were 65 years of age or older. For every 100 females there were 120.6 males, and for every 100 females age 18 and over there were 109.0 males.

0.0% of residents lived in urban areas, while 100.0% lived in rural areas.

There were 278 households in Lake Preston, of which 19.4% had children under the age of 18 living in them. Of all households, 42.4% were married-couple households, 30.2% were households with a male householder and no spouse or partner present, and 23.7% were households with a female householder and no spouse or partner present. About 44.9% of all households were made up of individuals and 19.5% had someone living alone who was 65 years of age or older.

There were 322 housing units, of which 13.7% were vacant. The homeowner vacancy rate was 0.5% and the rental vacancy rate was 6.9%.

Racial composition as of the 2020 census
Race	Number	Percent
White	551	93.5%
Black or African American	1	0.2%
American Indian and Alaska Native	2	0.3%
Asian	0	0.0%
Native Hawaiian and Other Pacific Islander	4	0.7%
Some other race	13	2.2%
Two or more races	18	3.1%
Hispanic or Latino (of any race)	19	3.2%

=== 2010 census ===
As of the census of 2010, there were 599 people, 295 households, and 162 families residing in the city. The population density was 788.2 inhabitants per square mile (304.3/km^{2}). There were 346 housing units at an average density of 455.3 per square mile (175.8/km^{2}). The racial makeup of the city was 98.3% White, 0.3% Native American, 0.2% Asian, 0.5% from other races, and 0.7% from two or more races. Hispanic or Latino of any race were 1.2% of the population.

There were 295 households, of which 20.0% had children under the age of 18 living with them, 46.8% were married couples living together, 5.8% had a female householder with no husband present, 2.4% had a male householder with no wife present, and 45.1% were non-families. 40.7% of all households were made up of individuals, and 19.7% had someone living alone who was 65 years of age or older. The average household size was 2.03 and the average family size was 2.77.

The median age in the city was 47.6 years. 20.2% of residents were under the age of 18; 5.5% were between the ages of 18 and 24; 17.8% were from 25 to 44; 34.5% were from 45 to 64; and 21.9% were 65 years of age or older. The gender makeup of the city was 50.9% male and 49.1% female.

=== 2000 census ===
As of the census of 2000, there were 737 people, 317 households, and 183 families residing in the city. The population density was 999.0 inhabitants per square mile (385.7/km^{2}). There were 355 housing units at an average density of 481.2 per square mile (185.8/km^{2}). The racial makeup of the city was 98.91% White, 0.81% Native American, and 0.27% from two or more races. Hispanic or Latino of any race were 0.95% of the population.

There were 317 households, out of which 26.5% had children under the age of 18 living with them, 50.2% were married couples living together, 5.4% had a female householder with no husband present, and 42.0% were non-families. 38.8% of all households were made up of individuals, and 23.3% had someone living alone who was 65 years of age or older. The average household size was 2.15 and the average family size was 2.88.

In the city, the population was spread out, with 22.7% under the age of 18, 5.6% from 18 to 24, 23.5% from 25 to 44, 19.0% from 45 to 64, and 29.3% who were 65 years of age or older. The median age was 43 years. For every 100 females, there were 94.5 males. For every 100 females age 18 and over, there were 89.4 males.

The median income for a household in the city was $29,125, and the median income for a family was $42,143. Males had a median income of $29,750 versus $18,750 for females. The per capita income for the city was $16,426. About 6.5% of families and 8.1% of the population were below the poverty line, including 6.6% of those under age 18 and 15.0% of those age 65 or over.

== In the media ==
Lake Preston is mentioned in the historical novel The Long Winter by American novelist Laura Ingalls Wilder. In the very severe winter of 1880–1881, a neighbor of Ingalls, David Gilbert, volunteered to make the very risky run from De Smet, South Dakota to Lake Preston (called, at that time, simply "Preston, Dakota Territory") to take outgoing mail and bring back the incoming mail. Though the distance was only about 12 miles, the trip was dangerous because of blizzards coming up very quickly throughout that winter, and a person caught on the prairie during a blizzard had almost no chance of survival.

== Notable people ==
Ora McMurry: Distinguished Service Cross, World War I

Robert Wood: Wisconsin State Assembly

== See also ==
- Lake Preston (South Dakota)
