= Talking Pictures TV =

British heritage television channel

Talking Pictures TV; (TPTV)
- Official logo for branding and merchandise
- Broadcast area: United Kingdom, Ireland
- Headquarters: Watford, Hertfordshire, England

Programming
- Language: British English
- Picture format: 576i (SDTV) 4:3 – main programming; 576i (SDTV) 16:9 – commercials, interstitial content

Ownership
- Owner: Talking Pictures TV Ltd

History
- Launched: 26 May 2015; 11 years ago

Links
- Website: TalkingPicturesTV.co.uk

Availability

Terrestrial
- Freeview UK: Channel 82
- Freesat: Channel 306
- Sky UK: Channel 324

Streaming media
- Freely: Channel 36

Talking Pictures TV (TPTV) is a British free-to-air vintage film and nostalgia television channel. It was launched on 26 May 2015; 11 years ago, on the Sky digital satellite television service in the United Kingdom. (Note: Sky relocated the channel to 328 in April 2018) Later it also became available on Freeview, Freesat, and Virgin Media.

Listed on some electronic programme guides (EPG) as TalkingPictures TV, it is on air 24 hours a day, and features primarily older British films, both classics and B-films. The schedule also includes some American films, classic television series, straight-to-video programmes, cinema shorts, extended interviews with veteran actors, and period home movies of British locations.

In July 2018, Talking Pictures TV had an audience share of 0.50%. As of 2019, it had reached an audience share of 0.63%.

== Foundation ==
Talking Pictures TV Ltd (TPTV Ltd) is a family business, founded by producer/editor Noel Cronin, and run by his daughter Sarah Cronin-Stanley with her husband Neill Stanley. Films in many genres (horror, comedy, drama, and thriller) are included in the schedule. In-house productions are also shown, as are items from the Cronins' own back catalogue, including Noel's Dandelion Distribution, as well as series from the archive of Southern Television, a former ITV contractor, and early American television shows. Films are usually copied directly from film reels; damaged reels from the catalogue are often replaced by donations, either from online, viewers or available libraries.

One of the aims of the founders was to maintain the history of British cinema; it was said to have been in the making since 2007. Older films, including those made in black and white, which were once regularly shown on terrestrial channels, such as BBC and Channel 4, but such programming had declined by the 2000s, with only the best known classic films occasionally being aired.

Cronin-Stanley explained to the Watford Observer in 2016 that "People were interested in the big titles, but he [her father Noel] wanted to save the smaller, more obscure titles, from getting lost". However, television networks rejected their pitches, unconvinced that it would be of high demand, so they decided to set up the channel independently. Cronin-Stanley later explained that the channel specialises in "the things people have forgotten".

== Availability ==
Talking Pictures TV was initially only available via digital satellite (DVB-S) on the Sky TV platform in the United Kingdom and Ireland. Since 15 September 2015, the channel has also been available on digital terrestrial (DVB-T) platform Freeview. It became available on Freesat channel 306 in February 2016, and on Virgin Media digital cable (DVB-C) platform on 1 June 2017. On Freeview, it was initially broadcast only in standard definition (SDTV) on a HD multiplex, and could be received only by Freeview HD equipment.

From 30 November 2017, the channel became available, to those within coverage (90 percent of UK households), on any TV capable of receiving Freeview. In 2018, the channel reportedly had a weekly audience of about 2 million, but BBC News reported that it possibly rose to as high as 6 million in mid-2020 (during the COVID-19 pandemic).

== Broadcast output ==
=== Films ===
A list of selected films shown on Talking Pictures TV:

film title	orig. year	genre	director	star cast
A Taste of Honey	1961	Drama	Tony Richardson	Dora Bryan, Rita Tushingham
An Alligator Named Daisy	1955	Comedy	J. Lee Thompson	Donald Sinden, Jeannie Carson
Au Pair Girls	1972	Comedy	Val Guest	Gabrielle Drake, Astrid Frank
Bad Blood	1981	Thriller	Mike Newell	Jack Thompson, Carol Burns
Ball of Fire	1941	Comedy	Howard Hawks	Gary Cooper, Barbara Stanwyck
Be My Guest	1965	Musical	Lance Comfort	David Hemmings, Steve Marriott
The Beach Girls	1982	Comedy	Pat Townsend	Jeana Tomasino, Debra Blee
Beat Girl	1960	Drama	Edmond T. Gréville	David Farrar, Noëlle Adam
Bedazzled	1967	Comedy	Stanley Donen	Peter Cook, Dudley Moore
The Black Book	1949	Thriller	Anthony Mann	Robert Cummings, Richard Basehart
Blood Mania	1970	Horror	Robert Vincent O'Neil	Peter Carpenter, Maria De Aragon
Blood of the Vampire	1958	Horror	Henry Cass	Donald Wolfit, Vincent Ball
Blue Money	1972	Drama	Alain Patrick	Alain Patrick, Barbara Mills
Brannigan	1975	Thriller	Douglas Hickox	John Wayne, Richard Attenborough
Can You Keep It Up for a Week?	1974	Comedy	Jim Atkinson	Jeremy Bulloch, Sue Longhurst
Carry On Admiral	1957	Comedy	Val Guest	David Tomlinson, Peggy Cummins
Children Shouldn't Play with Dead Things	1972	Comedy/horror	Bob Clark	Alan Ormsby, Valerie Mamches
Child's Play	1972	Drama	Sidney Lumet	James Mason, Robert Preston
Commuter Husbands	1972	Comedy	Derek Ford	Gabrielle Drake, Robin Bailey
Crucible of Horror	1971	Horror	Viktors Ritelis	Michael Gough, Yvonne Mitchell
Cry of the Banshee	1970	Horror	Gordon Hessler	Vincent Price, Hilary Dwyer
Cry, the Beloved Country	1951	Drama	Kellner Zoltán	Canada Lee, Sidney Poitier
Curse of the Fly	1965	Horror	Don Sharp	Brian Donlevy, George Baker
Curtain Up	1952	Comedy	Ralph Smart	Robert Morley, Margaret Rutherford
Deathdream	1974	Horror	Bob Clark	John Marley, Lynn Carlin
The Demon	1981	Horror	Percival Rubens	Cameron Mitchell, Jennifer Holmes
Dentist in the Chair	1960	Comedy	Don Chaffey	Bob Monkhouse, Peggy Cummins
Down Among the Z Men	1952	Comedy	Maclean Rogers	Harry Secombe, Michael Bentine
Every Day's a Holiday	1965	Comedy	James Hill	John Leyton, Mike Sarne
Friends	1971	Romance	Lewis Gilbert	Sean Bury, Anicée Alvina
Fourteen Hours	1951	Drama	Henry Hathaway	Paul Douglas, Richard Basehart
The Flying Deuces	1939	Comedy	A. Edward Sutherland	Stan Laurel, Oliver Hardy
The Frightened City	1961	Crime drama	John Lemont	Herbert Lom, John Gregson
The Frightened Man	1952	Crime drama	John Gilling	Dermot Walsh, Barbara Murray
Go for Broke!	1951	War drama	Robert Pirosh	Van Johnson, Lane Nakano
Hell Drivers	1957	Crime drama	Cy Endfield	Stanley Baker, Herbert Lom
Henry V	1944	Drama	Laurence Olivier	Laurence Olivier; Renée Asherson
His Girl Friday	1940	Comedy	Howard Hawks	Cary Grant; Rosalind Russell
Hobson's Choice	1954	Comedy	David Lean	Charles Laughton; John Mills
Home Before Midnight	1979	Drama	Pete Walker	James Aubrey; Alison Elliot
Hush...Hush, Sweet Charlotte	1964	Thriller	Robert Aldrich	Bette Davis, Olivia De Havilland
I Remember Mama	1948	Drama	George Stevens	Irene Dunne, Barbara Bel Geddes
Incident in Shanghai	1938	Drama	John Paddy Carstairs	Margaret Vyner, Patrick Barr
I See a Dark Stranger	1946	Comedy drama	Frank Launder	Deborah Kerr, Trevor Howard
It's a Wonderful World	1956	Comedy	Val Guest	Terence Morgan, George Cole
The L-Shaped Room	1962	Drama	Bryan Forbes	Leslie Caron, Tom Bell
The Life and Death of Colonel Blimp	1943	Drama	Michael Powell, Emeric Pressburger	Roger Livesey, Deborah Kerr)
Look Back in Anger	1959	Drama	Tony Richardson	Richard Burton, Claire Bloom
The Loneliness of the Long Distance Runner	1962	Drama	Tony Richardson	Tom Courtenay; Michael Redgrave
Lost in the Desert	1969	Drama	Jamie Uys	Wynard Uys; Jamie Uys
Malibu High	1979	Crime thriller	Irvin Berwick	Jill Lansing, Stuart Taylor
The Man in the Mirror	1936	Comedy	Maurice Elvey	Edward Everett Horton, Genevieve Tobin
The Man Who Could Cheat Death	1959	Horror	Terence Fisher	Anton Diffring, Hazel Court
Marilyn	1953	Crime drama	Wolf Rilla	Sandra Dorne, Maxwell Reed
Mark of the Phoenix	1958	Drama	Maclean Rogers	Julia Arnall, Sheldon Lawrence
Melody	1971	Comedy	Waris Hussein	Mark Lester, Tracy Hyde
The Million Pound Note	1955	Comedy	Ronald Neame	Gregory Peck, Ronald Squire
The Mouse on the Moon	1963	Comedy	Richard Lester	Margaret Rutherford, Bernard Cribbins, Terry-Thomas, David Kossoff, Ron Moody
The New York Hat	1912	Silent film	D.W. Griffith	Mary Pickford, Charles Hill Mailes
Night Boat to Dublin	1946	Thriller	Lawrence Huntington	Robert Newton, Raymond Lovell
Night of the Big Heat	1967	Sci-fi	Terence Fisher	Christopher Lee, Patrick Allen
No Love for Johnnie	1961	Drama	Ralph Thomas	Peter Finch, Stanley Holloway
Notorious	1946	Thriller	Alfred Hitchcock	Cary Grant, Ingrid Bergman
Once a Jolly Swagman	1949	Drama	Jack Lee	Dirk Bogarde, Bonar Colleano
Once in a New Moon	1935	Sci-fi	Anthony Kimmins	Eliot Makeham, Rene Ray
Our Girl Friday	1953	Comedy	Noel Langley	Joan Collins, George Cole
The Plough and the Stars	1937	Drama	John Ford	Barbara Stanwyck, Preston Foster
The Pom Pom Girls	1976	Comedy	Joseph Ruben	Robert Carradine, Jennifer Ashley
The Prime of Miss Jean Brodie	1969	Drama	Ronald Neame	Maggie Smith, Robert Stephens
Pygmalion	1938	Drama	Anthony Asquith, Leslie Howard	Leslie Howard, Wendy Hiller
Radio Cab Murder	1954	Drama	Vernon Sewell	Jimmy Hanley, Lana Morris
Raffles	1939	Drama	Sam Wood	David Niven, Olivia De Havilland
Rasputin the Mad Monk	1966	Horror	Don Sharp	Christopher Lee, Barbara Shelley
The Resurrection of Zachary Wheeler	1971	Sci-fi	Bob Wynn	Leslie Nielsen, Bradford Dillman
Richard III	1955	Drama	Laurence Olivier	Laurence Olivier, Ralph Richardson
Rosie Dixon – Night Nurse	1978	Comedy	Justin Cartwright	Beryl Reid, John Le Mesurier
Sapphire	1959	Crime drama	Basil Dearden	Nigel Patrick, Yvonne Mitchell
Saturday Night and Sunday Morning	1980	Drama	Karel Reisz	Albert Finney, Shirley Anne Field
Say Hello to Yesterday	1970	Drama	Alvin Rakoff	Jean Simmons, Leonard Whiting
Séance on a Wet Afternoon	1964	Drama	Bryan Forbes	Kim Stanley, Richard Attenborough
Sextette	1978	Musical drama	Ken Hughes	Mae West, Timothy Dalton
The Skull	1965	Horror	Freddie Francis	Peter Cushing, Patrick Wymark
Sparrows Can't Sing	1963	Comedy	Joan Littlewood	James Booth, Barbara Windsor
Suburban Wives	1971	Comedy	Derek Ford	Eva Whishaw, Barry Linehan
Tarka the Otter	1979	Adventure	David Cobham	Edward Underdown, Peter Ustinov (narrator)
Tom Brown's Schooldays	1951	Drama	Gordon Parry	John Howard Davies, Robert Newton
The Trollenberg Terror	1958	Sci-fi horror	Quentin Lawrence	Forrest Tucker, Laurence Payne
Tomboy	1985	Comedy	Herb Freed	Betsy Russell, Gerard Christopher
To the Devil a Daughter	1976	Horror	Peter Sykes	Richard Widmark, Christopher Lee
The Van	1977	Comedy	Sam Grossman	Stuart Goetz, Deborah White
Virgin Witch	1972	Horror	Ray Austin	Ann Michelle, Vicki Michelle
What Ever Happened to Aunt Alice?	1969	Thriller	Lee H. Katzin	Geraldine Page, Ruth Gordon
Whistle Down the Wind	1961	Drama	Bryan Forbes	Hayley Mills, Bernard Lee
White Cargo	1973	Comedy	Ray Selfe	David Jason, Hugh Lloyd
Who Is Killing the Great Chefs of Europe?	1978	Black comedy	Ted Kotcheff	George Segal, Jacqueline Bisset, Robert Morley, Jean-Pierre Cassel, Philippe Noiret, Jean Rochefort, Gigi Proietti, Stefano Satta Flores, Madge Ryan, Frank Windsor, Peter Sallis, Jacques Balutin, Michael Chow
The Young Ones	1961	Musical comedy	Sidney J. Furie	Cliff Richard, Robert Morley

=== Television series ===
Talking Pictures TV features several classic British television series, mostly from Southern Television productions for the ITV network, along with series from American broadcasters ABC, CBS, and NBC. Many of the American television shows were produced by Four Star Television.

New television programmes for 2022 included The Heritage Chart Show with Mike Read, a pop music countdown of videos and live performances from veteran acts, presented on Sunday nights by the former Radio 1 disc jockey Mike Read and shared with the Local TV network of channels. Also, Read can be seen each week with Talking Pictures TV founder Noel Cronin on the channel's archive programme The Footage Detectives, a show which discusses forgotten films and lost TV shows such as The Barnstormers from 1964.

==== British programmes ====
- A Family at War (Granada for ITV 1970–72)
- The Adventures of Robin Hood (ITC 1955–1959)
- Armchair Theatre (Thames Television 1968–74)
- The Brothers (BBC 1972-76)
- Budgie (LWT 1971–2)
- Callan (Thames Television 1967–72)
- Catweazle (London Weekend Television (LWT) 1970–71)
- Colonel March of Scotland Yard (ITV 1956)
- Crown Court (Granada 1972–1984)
- Danger UXB (Euston Films for Thames 1979)
- Dick Barton - Special Agent (Southern 1979)
- The Edgar Wallace Mystery Theatre (1960–1965)
- The Flockton Flyer (Southern 1977–78)
- For the Love of Ada (Thames 1970–1971)
- Freewheelers (Southern 1971–1972)
- The Gentle Touch (LWT 1980–1984)
- Get Some In! (Thames Television 1975–1978)
- Gideon's Way (ITC Entertainment 1965–1966)
- Hannay (Thames 1988–1989)
- Hawkeye (ITC Entertainment, 1957)
- Hogg's Back (Southern 1975–1976)
- The Human Jungle (ABC 1963–1965)
- In Suspicious Circumstances (Granada 1991–1996)
- Lord Tramp (Southern 1977)
- Lytton's Diary (Thames 1985–86)
- The Mind of Mr. J.G. Reeder (Thames Television 1969–1971)
- Mystery and Imagination (ABC and Thames for ITV 1966–1970)
- No Hiding Place (selected surviving episodes) (Associated-Rediffusion c1960)
- Noah's Castle (ITV 1980)
- Now for Nookie (Southern 1981)
- The Onedin Line (BBC 1971–1980)
- Overseas Press Club - Exclusive! (ITV 1957)
- Park Ranger (ITV 1979)
- Public Eye (ABC and Thames Television for ITV 1965–1975)
- The Ravelled Thread (ITV 1979–1980)
- The Rivals of Sherlock Holmes (Thames Television 1971–1973)
- Robin's Nest (Thames Television 1977–1981)
- Rooms (Thames 1975–77)
- Rumpole of the Bailey (Thames Television 1978–1992)
- Runaround (Southern Television, 1975–1981)
- Scarf Jack (Southern 1981)
- Scotland Yard (ABC 1953–1961)
- Secret Army (BBC 1977–79)
- Shadows (Thames Television 1975–78)
- Shadows of Fear (Thames Television 1970–73)
- Spearhead (Southern 1978–1981)
- Special Branch (Thames Television 1969–74)
- Sunday Night at the London Palladium (ATV 1955-69)
- Take a Letter, Mr. Jones (Southern 1981)
- Take Two (Elstree Studios, 2016)
- Tell Me Another (Southern 1976–1979)
- Thunderbirds (ITV 1965–1966)
- Together (Southern 1980–1981)
- Upstairs, Downstairs (LWT 1971–1975)
- Van der Valk (Thames Television 1972–1992)
- Widows (Thames Television 1983–1985)

==== American programmes ====
- The Big Valley (ABC 1965–1969)
- Black Saddle (ABC 1959–1960)
- Burke's Law / Amos Burke: Secret Agent (ABC 1963–1966)
- The David Niven Show (NBC 1959)
- The Detectives (ABC / NBC 1959–1962)
- The Dick Powell Theatre (NBC 1961–1963)
- Honey West (ABC 1965–1966)
- Johnny Ringo (CBS 1959–1960)
- The June Allyson Show (CBS 1959–1961)
- The Law and Mr. Jones (ABC 1960–1961)
- Mrs. G. Goes to College (CBS 1961–1962)
- The Outer Limits (ABC 1963–1965)
- The Rogues (NBC 1964–1965)
- Stagecoach West (ABC 1960–1961)
- Target: The Corruptors! (ABC 1961–1962)
- The Tom Ewell Show (CBS 1960–1961)
- Turn of Fate (NBC 1957–1960)
- The Westerner (NBC 1960)

=== Other ===
Talking Pictures TV also features several films from the series featuring Old Mother Riley, and from the British Film Institute's (BFI) archives, including several significant documentaries, and a considerable number of Children's Film Foundation productions, named under a series segment Glimpses. Its intention is for both nostalgia and education, as well as reminding the audience of the past; some footage is donated by viewers. The series is the most popular original content on the channel and its compilation DVD is the most popular buy on Renown Film's website.

The Take Two series was presented by Elstree historian Morris Bright, and occasionally Robert Ross and/or the channel creators, who interview famous actors whose films and programming is airing on the channel, such as Nanette Newman, Angela Douglas, Rita Tushingham, Sylvia Syms, Michael Craig, Shirley Eaton, Sally Thomsett, Jack Smethurst, Jenny Hanley, Norman Eshley, Valerie Leon, Madeline Smith, Marc Sinden, and Janette Scott; a few of them recorded station idents for the channel. An interview with A Family at War creator John Finch was also aired, as well as Neil Sean Meets..., an interviewing series presented by Neil Sean, who has interviewed historians and celebrities of the mid-20th century, such as Tommy Steele, Roger Moore and Eden Kane.

Interviews from 2018 onwards have been filmed in the Cinema Museum in the wake of the museum's foreclosure announcement; the interviewees there include Mark Lester, George Layton, Anita Harris, Sid James's daughter Reina, Anneke Wills, and Peter Butterworth's son Tyler. Some interviews in the series were later released on a DVD collection named Talking Pictures with....

=== Themed days ===
The channel has featured themed days, such as "An Afternoon with Liz Fraser" (14 August 2016), "1960s Day", "Sophia Loren Evening" (20 September 2016), "Music Hall Monday" (18 January 2016), "Diana Dors Day" (14 May 2017), and "An Afternoon with Patricia Dainton" (12 April 2016), in which the actress came out of retirement to provide introductions to her films. "Laurel and Hardy Month" aired their short films and feature-length productions throughout September 2017 and their movies continue to be shown. "Ronald Colman Season" occurred throughout November and December 2016, airing movies such as The Devil to Pay!, Bulldog Drummond, and Raffles.

15 February 2018 was "Sam Kydd Day", with showings of a handful of his movies and television appearances, excerpts from his diaries and anecdotes of his life from his son Jonathan. 15 March 2019 was "John Gregson Day" which featured movies and television that starred/featured the actor, along with interviews with his family members and remaining cast members of his filmography. There have also been special guests that host their favourite vintage media that has appeared on the channel, such as Danny Baker and Vic Reeves.

name	date	topic	notes	ref(s)
Dial M For Monday	7 December 2015	B-movie crime films		
Music Hall Monday	18 January 2016	British Music hall films		
Vintage Valentines	14 February 2016	Romance films	Aired on Valentine's Day; Repeated the following year	
Monster Monday	4 March 2016	B-movie monster films		
An Afternoon with Patricia Dainton	12 April 2016	Celebrating the film career of Patricia Dainton	Aired on Dainton's 86th birthday; Included exclusive interviews with Dainton and cast members of her films	
Trip Down Memory Lane	28 April 2016	Films set on planes, boats, and trains		
Pop Goes to the Movies	27 May 2016	Films that starred/had cameo appearances from pop groups		
An Afternoon with Liz Fraser	14 August 2016	Celebrating the career of Liz Fraser	Aired on Fraser's 86th birthday	
1960s Day	16 September 2016	Musical films from the 1960s		
Sophia Loren Evening	20 September 2016	Celebrating the career of Sophia Loren	Aired on Loren's 82nd birthday	
Ronald Colman Season	2 November – 3 December 2016	Celebrating the career of Ronald Colman; aired sporadically		
Diana Dors Day	14 May 2017	Celebrating the career of Diana Dors		
Vic Reeves takes over Talking Pictures TV	23 July 2017	Schedule chosen and hosted by Vic Reeves		
Laurel and Hardy Month	September 2017	Laurel and Hardy comedy shorts aired sporadically throughout the month		
Danny Baker takes over Talking Pictures TV	7 October 2017	Schedule chosen and hosted by comedian Danny Baker	Co-hosted by historian Robert Ross	
Laurel and Hardy Season	– 3 March 2018	Laurel and Hardy comedy shorts aired sporadically throughout	Spiritual successor of September 2017's "Laurel and Hardy Month"	
Sam Kydd Day	15 February 2018	Celebrating the career of Sam Kydd	Aired on Kydd's birthday anniversary; Exclusive interviews with family; Son Jonathan reads excerpts from Kydd's diary	
Will Hay Thursdays	1 March – 26 April 2018	Celebrating the career of Will Hay by airing his films every Thursday		
John Gregson Day	15 March 2019	Celebrating the career of John Gregson	Aired on Gregson's 100th birthday anniversary; Exclusive interviews with Gregson's family	
A Celebration of British Transport Films	22–25 April 2019	100th anniversary of transport (e.g. railway) in the UK, through documentaries	Films created by British Transport Films	
Stanley Baker Day	28 June 2019	Celebrating the career of Stanley Baker	43rd anniversary of Baker's death; Exclusive interviews with Baker's family	
Kenneth More Day	12 July 2019	Celebrating the career of Kenneth More	37th anniversary of More's death	
Dora Bryan Day	15:30, 19 October 2019	Celebrating the career of Dora Bryan	Begins from 3:30pm until midnight; Hosted by Paul O'Grady, with Rita Tushingham	

=== Themed nights ===
In 2021, the channel introduced The Cellar Club with Caroline Munro, a Friday night block of crime, sci-fi and horror films, like 1974 Hammer production Captain Kronos The Vampire Hunter and Joseph Green's The Brain That Wouldn't Die from 1962.

=== Controversy, racial slurs ===
The regulator Ofcom has warned the channel about the use of racial slurs in its programming on a handful of occasions, including an episode of Granada Television's A Family at War, originally broadcast in the early 1970s, shown by TPTV in the hour just before the 9pm watershed, and an uncensored interview with Joan Turner during her appearance on the talk show Tell Me Another.

Cronin-Stanley told The Times in February 2018: "Ofcom say we need to advise people before they watch something that it may contain outdated racial stereotyping, but I would say that's babysitting our audience". However, since late 2018, warning notices have been displayed just before some programmes begin, stating, for example, that a programme "was made between 1978 and 1992" and that "Some viewers may be offended by the language and attitudes expressed by some characters ... which reflect the time it was made." (Note: Shown before episodes of Rumpole of the Bailey.) In addition, occurrences of such terms may be removed from the soundtrack and the subtitles. (Note: For example, a showing in November 2020 of the 1945 documentary Burma Victory deleted all references to Japanese forces as "Japs".)

== Related projects ==
=== Renown Pictures ===
For over 20 years, Cronin-Stanley and Cronin have been patrons of a DVD membership club, The Renown Film Club, for fans of B-film classics. Cronin had worked for The Rank Organisation and Central Office of Information, and bought the rights to several libraries that owned films that air on TPTV, such as much of the Southern Television library, and originally licensed them out to terrestrial channels. Many of the films aired on Talking Pictures TV are available to buy on DVD, often sold as compilations under different genres, through the distributing company, both online and through the Renown's telephone service. Each DVD set is full of films made between the 1930s and 1960s, and also include special features, such as interviews and history. Other merchandise is also sold on the website, such as mugs, clothing, biographies, and calendars (available to buy in December for the new year), often branded under Talking Pictures TV's name. In spring 2019, Renown released its first CD compilation album named Hits From the Flicks, three CDs of songs from musicals and movies with pop song theme tunes that had aired on the channel.

=== The Renown Film Festival ===
Since 2014, the channel's producers created the Renown Film Festival, which celebrates classic British film, featuring guest appearances by actors whose films have been aired, as well as historians, who give interviews; there are also screenings for films that were once considered lost, and memorabilia available to buy and be autographed by the actors. It occurs annually in February, and tickets are advertised on both TPTV's website and the channel. Actors who have appeared on the guest lists include Jess Conrad (who reunited with the remaining cast of The Boys in 2017), Rita Tushingham, Brian Murphy, Melvyn Hayes, and Derren Nesbitt.

The festival takes place in Hertfordshire, such as Watersmeet Theatre, Rickmansworth and St. Albans' The Alban Arena, but 2019 was the first year to have more than one festival in a year; October 2019 was the Renown Film's 6th Festival of Film at the Stockport Plaza, which also featured special guests, film screenings, and memorabilia. Although tickets sold out, St. Albans' 2020 Festival was postponed due to the coronavirus outbreak.

=== Podcast ===
A spin-off podcast named The Talking Pictures TV Podcast was announced in December 2018 by Adam Roche, the creator of the podcasts The Secret History of Hollywood and Attaboy Clarence, and began broadcasting on 3 February 2019. Each episode is uploaded monthly to coincide with TPTV's schedule releases and invites the audience to review movies and television programmes that will broadcast on the channel during that month. Its first episode became the most popular podcast in the UK iTunes chart within roughly five hours.

=== TPTV Encore ===
On 1 December 2021, TPTV Encore launched. It is Talking Pictures TV's official streaming service for viewers to catch up with the latest media recently aired on the channel, as well as hosting Renown Pictures' Southern TV archive.

== See also ==
- List of television stations in the United Kingdom
