= Vansploitation =

Term and film genre used to describe American independent films from the 1970s

Vansploitation is a term and film genre used to describe American independent films from the 1970s, in which a van or vans are the main key element to the plot, and feature comedic stories about young adults.

== History ==
The short-lived genre emerged in the United States during the early 1970s, exploiting the popularity of vans with young adults, and was very popular in the mid to late 1970s, but quickly fell off after the 1970s. Vansploitation films were originally made mostly for young audiences. Blue Summer (1973) is credited as the first film of the genre, which continued with films like The Van (1977) and Van Nuys Blvd. (1979), the latter having been called "the most technically competent Vansploitation film".

== Defining qualities of the genre ==
Coffman argues that the mere appearance of a van in a film does not make it a vansploitation film. The van has to serve a special purpose in the story, which is summed up in the trailer of Van Nuys Blvd.: "Freedom, fun and fine transportation". Often, vans were highly customized, up to the extent of having an entirely custom body in Supervan. Besides the van itself, van culture (wardrobe, magazines, meetings of van drivers) is also often featured prominently.

The van (or vans) must provide the engine that drives the plot forward and/or provide the stage in which the action of the plot actually takes place. ... The characters in Vansploitation films generally have goals oriented toward spending as much time in their van as possible, or in putting money into improving their van's performance and/or appearance via customization. ... In short, most van movies are about getting laid (in a van) and winning road games or other competitions (also in a van).

— Jason Coffman, article about the Vansploitation genre.

Most vansploitation movies were about harmlessly rebellious young people outwitting the stodgy authority figures bent on stopping them from having a good time.

— Scott Ashlin, review of the film Twister's Revenge!.

The Van was one of those typical American exploitation movies. Central to the theme was a young man who gets the notion to forget about college and buy an expensive Dodge van.

— George Barris / David Fetherston, book about Barris' work on the vans in the film.

The genre follows two earlier ones that also dealt with car-related topics popular in youth culture at their respective times: In the 1950s, films featuring Hot Rods became very popular, and they were followed by motorcycle films in the 1960s (for example, The Wild Angels and Easy Rider). As the popularity of vans in youth culture increased in the early 1970s, the first vansploitation films were created. Multiple factors are credited with creating the "customized van craze". For example, in 1975, the song "Chevy Van" by Sammy Johns sold about three million copies, and is credited for an increase in van sales the following year. The song (among others by Sammy Johns) was used prominently in the soundtrack of The Van (1977).

== Notable films ==
Coffman names six films as "essential texts" for the vansploitation genre:

- 1973: Blue Summer (aka Love Truck), directed by Chuck Vincent
- 1976: C.B. Hustlers, directed by Stu Segall
- 1977: The Van, directed by Sam Grossman
- 1977: Supervan, directed by Lamar Card
- 1978: Mag Wheels (aka Summer School), directed by Bethel Buckalew
- 1979: Van Nuys Blvd., directed by William Sachs
