= The Van (1977 film) =

1977 American low-budget independent teen comedy film by Sam Grossman

- Theatrical release poster
- Directed by: Sam Grossman
- Written by: Celia Susan Cotelo; Robert J. Rosenthal
- Produced by: Paul Lewis; Marilyn Jacobs Tenser (executive producer)
- Starring: Stuart Goetz; Deborah White; Harry Morgan Moses; Marcie Barkin; Bill Adler; Steve Oliver; Connie Hoffman; Danny DeVito
- Music by: Steve Eaton; Sammy Johns; Michael Lloyd
- Distributed by: Crown International Pictures
- Release date: April 7, 1977
- Running time: 92 minutes
- Country: United States
- Language: English
- Box office: $4.5 million or $5 million or $19 million

The Van is a 1977 American low-budget independent teen comedy film directed by Sam Grossman and starring Stuart Getz, Deborah White, Danny DeVito, Harry Moses, Marcie Barkin, Bill Adler, Stephen Oliver, and Connie Lisa Marie.

Primarily released to drive-in theaters in 1977, the film was released at the peak of the vansploitation genre. It was followed by the 1978 film Malibu Beach, in which Stephen Oliver reprised his role as bully Dugan Hicks.

== Plot ==
Bobby is a recent high school graduate who decides to spend his entire college savings on a highly customized Dodge Tradesman van, equipped with a waterbed, high-end stereo, and plush carpeting. His goal is to use the vehicle to improve his social life and success with women, reflecting the "custom van craze" of the late 1970s.

While his best friend Jack is more naturally successful with women, Bobby struggles with his confidence. He eventually falls for Tina, a shy girl who is initially unimpressed by the van's flashiness. The narrative follows Bobby's misadventures at van shows and drag races, culminating in a showdown with a local bully named Dugan. Through these experiences, Bobby learns that while the van provides him a platform, his own character is what ultimately earns Tina's respect.

== Cast ==
- Stuart Goetz as Bobby
- Deborah White as Tina
- Harry Morgan Moses as Jack
- Marcie Barkin as Sue
- Bill Adler as Steve
- Steve Oliver as Dugan
- Connie Hoffman as Sally
- Danny DeVito as Andy

== Production ==
Production on The Van began on November 8, 1976, with locations in Moorpark, Whittier, Stanton, and Malibu, California. Legendary car customizer George Barris was commissioned to build two Dodge B300 extended-length Tradesman vans, with one being the primary picture car, and a backup that was used for all stunt driving scenes. An additional van, the antagonist's "Van Killer", was built by Barris as well, while the vans in the "van show" sequence were all various local Southern California customs.

== Soundtrack ==
The film's soundtrack consists primarily of material recorded by Sammy Johns for the GRC Records label in Atlanta between 1973 and 1975. Under the "Musical Supervision" of Michael Lloyd, the studio utilized existing masters—including the 1975 remixes of "Chevy Van" and "Rag Doll"—to create a cohesive pop-rock backdrop for the film. This followed a production model established by Crown International Pictures with The Pom Pom Girls (1976), which similarly utilized a pre-existing album by Cotton, Lloyd & Christian.

== Critique ==
The film shows stereotypical teenage boys whose social lives revolve around getting high, drag racing, and pursuing girls. The film features music from Sammy Johns (most notably his 1973 song "Chevy Van"), and is representative of its time. It exemplifies the free sex of an era before herpes and AIDS awareness, and celebrates the cultural tropes of the time, such as the heavily accessorized van that provides the film's title and the van's 8-track player.

The film is an early example of a relatively new type of teen comedy, which featured sexual situations, nudity and substance abuse, very different from the Beach Party films of the early 1960s, with their no-nudity, drug-free plots. The Van was one of a set of four Crown International Pictures releases (the others being The Pom Pom Girls, Malibu Beach and Van Nuys Blvd.) that helped herald a form that would be exemplified by 1980 with The Hollywood Knights and later with the Porky's series.

The film is referenced in every single episode of the Grindbin Podcast, a podcast dedicated to the discussion of exploitation films. The Van was the subject of the very first episode (and subsequently covered a second time in a later episode commemorating the show's one-year anniversary) Host Mike Wood is such a fan of the film that he created a recurring segment where at the end of each episode, he asks each guest host to imagine absurd scenarios wherein Goetz and DeVito's characters cross over to the universe of whatever film they are discussing (i.e. "How do Bobby and DeVito fit into the world of Savage Streets?", etc.)

== Reception ==
In six days over the July 4 holiday, the film grossed $2.5 million from 360 theaters, a record for Crown at the time.

== Home media ==
The film was released on Blu-ray in 2017 by Scorpion Releasing, featuring a 2K restoration from the original 35mm elements. This release included an interview with star Stuart Goetz and a look at the custom van culture of the era.

== Copyright Status ==
The film is frequently cited in legal and film history discussions for its lack of a formal copyright notice in the original theatrical prints. Under the Copyright Act of 1909 and the subsequent transition to the 1976 Act, works published without a notice between 1964 and 1977 often failed to secure protection, potentially placing the film in the public domain upon its release.
