= Spooky House =

- Film poster
- Directed by: William Sachs
- Written by: Margaret Sachs & William Sachs
- Produced by: William Sachs
- Starring: Ben Kingsley; Mercedes Ruehl; Matt Weinberg
- Cinematography: Thomas Burstyn
- Edited by: Jeremy Presner
- Music by: Garry Schyman
- Production company: Spooky House Entertainment LLC
- Distributed by: Anderson Digital; ECG Worldwide Entertainment; Entertainment Highway; Phoenicia Pictures; R.S. Entertainment; Studio Works Entertainment
- Release date: April 19, 2002
- Running time: 106 minutes
- Country: United States
- Language: English
- Box office: $65,875

Spooky House is a 2002 American family comedy film directed, co-produced and co-written by William Sachs, and starring Ben Kingsley and Mercedes Ruehl. It was entered into the Chicago International Children's Film Festival, winning two awards, "Best Of Fest" and the "Children's Jury Award".

== Plot ==
Alexander York, known as The Great Zamboni, is a famous illusionist who works with his wife and assistant, Dawn Starr. During a recording session of one of his shows, something goes wrong during the act, and Dawn Starr disappears.

Eleven and a half years later, Zamboni lives alone in an old manor house, with his pet jaguar Shadow. He uses his character to scare off visitors and builds a reputation for himself as "the Spooky Man" in the "Spooky House". Also living in this town is a recently orphaned Max, as well as his friends Yuri, Beans, Prescott, and Zoe. While they are trying to enjoy themselves as much as they can before Max is sent to an orphanage after Halloween, the five kids also run afoul with three teenage kleptomaniac neighborhood bullies: high school students Mona, Mike the Mouth, and Dumb Dave. The trio all work for Madame Boss, who is training them to be real thieves.

The teens steal Zoe's pet goat Princess and stash her in a graveyard near the Spooky House, forcing the kids to go after her. Zamboni, seeing the children, uses various tricks and traps in his home to scare everyone away, but Max is not afraid, and becomes intrigued by Zamboni. He begins repeatedly visiting the reluctant illusionist, who begins begrudgingly interacting with him. One day, the teens steal back Princess, leading Max to suggest talking to Zamboni and asking for help. When he does not answer, Max peeks through the window to see Shadow with her tail stuck in one of Zamboni's traps and goes to rescue her. Zamboni arrives home and angrily tells the children to leave his house. While researching Zamboni, the children discover that the last thing he ever said to Dawn Starr before her disappearance was "I hate children", upsetting Max.

When the teenage bullies torment Max, steal a wand given to him by Zamboni, and destroy his bicycle, he returns to Zamboni and reports the incident, where the latter formulates a plan: the kids will steal back what was stolen, and lure the thieves to the Zamboni's house where they will foil their and Madame Boss' plans using elaborate traps. They then set the execution to Halloween night.

On Halloween night, the children break into Madame Boss' shop to steal and stumble upon her meeting with the teens. Zoe recognizes Princess' bleats and retrieves her while Max successfully steals the wand. The noise they make alerts the villains, but they manage to flee from their shop in time and lure them to the house. With all the children safe, the teenage bullies break into the house using the graveyard. Once inside, they attempt to locate the children, springing various traps. After scaring the teens with some tricks and help from Shadow, Madame Boss arrives. She holds Max hostage, but Zamboni manages to fight her off and subdue her while one of the children alerts the police.

The authorities arrive and arrest the culprits, after which the children enjoy the rest of Halloween with Zamboni. Soon after Max is taken by his adoptive parents but he is unhappy and returns back to the orphanage.

Some time later, Zamboni returns to the stage to host a show for the orphanage. After bringing Max onstage as a volunteer for a trick in which he and Shadow switch places, Zamboni announces to the audience that he has officially adopted Max. When Zamboni goes to retrieve Shadow, she has magically transformed back into Dawn Starr, who became a jaguar when she disappeared all those years ago. Zamboni and Starr embrace, and leave with Max as a happy family.

== Cast ==
- Ben Kingsley as Alexander "The Great Zamboni" York
- Mercedes Ruehl as Boss
- Katharine Isabelle as Mora
- Matt Weinberg as Max
- Jason Fuchs as Yuri
- Ronald Joshua Scott as Beans
- Simon Baker as Prescott
- Chaz Monet as Zoe

== Production ==
William Sachs co-wrote the screenplay together with his wife Margaret Sachs. The film was shot in Vancouver, and was released in 35 American theaters in 2002, becoming the top-grossing film during that time in some of them. The Great Zamboni was originally to be played by Christopher Lloyd who signed on in 1998.

== Reception ==
According to Nicole Dreiske, founder and executive director of the Chicago International Children's Film Festival, it was the first time in the festival's 17-year history that the children's jury unanimously picked a winner when Spooky House won.

== Quotes ==
The kids whooped, hollered, cheered, and applauded during the movie. They held hands like one unit, swung together and danced in the aisles. I haven't seen anything like it in the seventeen years of the festival. All the kids came out asking when they could see the picture again…The kids' jury score was the highest in the seventeen years of the festival. It was a unanimous vote... The darling of the festival, the favorite of the festival, the hit of the festival…It's the most commercial movie we've ever had in the festival! (...) Spooky House was a resounding success with children of all ages. Kids walked out of the screening asking where they can get copies of the videocassette to see over and over again. It's a tremendous crowd pleaser.

— Nicole Dreiske, about Spooky House screening at Chicago International Children's Film Festival

Spooky House is incredibly likable, a consistently delightful Halloween treat that'll make kids smile and maybe even get a few grins out of the grown-ups as well. It's sweet, magical fluff.

— David Cornelius, review on eFilmCritic.com

== See also ==
- List of American films of 2002
- List of films set around Halloween
