= Beach Girls =

Beach Girls may refer to:

- Beach Girls (American TV series), a 2005 American mini-series broadcast by Lifetime Television
- Beach Girls (Indian TV series), a Tamil-language reality show broadcast on Raj TV
- The Beach Girls, a 1982 sex comedy film starring Jeana Tomasina
- The Beach Girls (novel), a 1959 novel by John D. MacDonald
