= Sally Sallies Forth =

1928 film

Sally Sallies Forth is a 1928 silent British one-reeler black and white film, with a rare all female cast and crew. It was written and directed by Frances Lascot and filmed and edited by Ivy A. Low. It should not be confused with the 1933 British film of the same name.

Usually described as "amateur" as neither the director nor actors were paid (despite claiming an "all-star cast") and it was never on general release, it is nevertheless an important milestone in female film-making.

== Plot ==
Sally is sent out by her mother with a bag of laundry to deliver to a customer. En route a chauffeur-driven car enters the gateway of a large house and she looks in. They spot her and as it happens they need a maid for a day and ask her to help.

They are having a small garden party. The guests arrive one by one and are invited in by Sally and shown to the garden, which backs onto open countryside. The guests try to educate Sally in their specialties, including dancing, singing, posing for a drawing, and smoking a pipe. Sally fails comically at all of them and goes home exhausted by the experience.

== Cast ==
see

- Sally - Sadie Andrews
- Sally's Mum - Nan Kearns
- Chauffeuse - Frances Lascot
- Mrs Bond-Regent, the Lady of the House - Margaret Leslie
- Miss C H Elsea - Sylvia Cole
- Angela Scales - Iris Campbell
- Flossie Footlight, the actress - Nora Pfeil
- Claudia Woodby-Mannish, the tomboy - Hylde Rodgers
- Primrose Spring - Fancy Larkins

== Public Broadcast ==
The film began to be publicly broadcast by Talking Pictures TV on 4 August 2020.
