= Secrets of the Gods =

1977 film directed by William Sachs

- Directed by: William Sachs
- Written by: Donn Davison; William Sachs; Barbara Morris Davison
- Produced by: Donn Davison; Edward L. Montoro
- Narrated by: Rosko
- Cinematography: Ralf D. Bode
- Edited by: William Sachs
- Music by: Garry Schyman
- Release date: December 2, 1977
- Running time: 85 minutes
- Country: United States
- Language: English

Secrets of the Gods (re-released in theaters under the title The Force Beyond in 1977) is a 1976 American paranormal documentary film directed by William Sachs, hosted by exploitation film producer Donn Davison and narrated by William "Rosko" Mercer.

The film covers investigations of a wide variety of paranormal subjects and mysteries including UFOs and Bigfoot.

== Background ==
Director William Sachs made the film as a satire, saying "I thought it was a satire on what people thought the secrets of the gods were, how spacemen came and made it with Bigfoot and that's what became us."

Regarding UFOs, "I went to a UFO convention in Fort Smith, Arkansas, and I shot a lot of people in distorted lens while they were being interviewed, probably a 14mm or 20mm lens. It makes them look round, like through a fish-eye lens. There was a physicist that was sure the invasion was coming, Colman Von Koviczky-we called him Colman Vodka Whiskey."

== Synopsis ==
The film opens with a discussion of the War of the Worlds radio broadcast and its effects on the listening audience. Engineer Don Elkins and astrologer Michael C. Heleus discuss the 1965 Northeast blackout and how it was caused by aliens. A discussion of the scale of the galaxy follows, including heliocentricity, Giordano Bruno and commentary from George Wald. Producer Davison claims that proof of UFOs will appear on footage smuggled from “behind the Iron Curtain,” to be shown at the film’s conclusion. The following segments continue:

“Bigfoot Country.” A discussion of Bigfoot research, with commentary from Peter Byrne, Rene Dahinden and Count Pino Turrolla.

“The Psychic Search for Atlantis.” Exploring predictions of Edgar Cayce, the Bimini Wall and hypnotic regression. Discussions of mysterious disappearances include the riverboat Iron Mountain (1872), David Lang in Gallatin (1880), Welshman Oliver Thomas (1909), Chinese troops in Nanking (1939), troops during the Spanish Civil War (1711), 600 French troops in Indochina (1885) and the crew of the Navy blimp L-8 (1942).

“The Devil’s Triangle.” Discussing mysterious occurrences in the Bermuda Triangle, including the National Airlines 727 time jump, disappearance of USS Cyclops, Flight 19, and UFO sightings from Christopher Columbus and Thor Heyerdahl.

“U.F.O.’s Explained!” Curious artifacts include 2-foot-tall adult skeletons in Utah, a Colorado monolith face, the Nazca lines, the Tunguska explosion, the Washington DC UFO flap, moon dust storms in October 1975, Apollo 12 reports and moon megaliths reported by Luna 9. Interviews include Walt Andrus of MUFON, Jim and Carol Lorenzen of APRO, Charles Hickson, Leo Sprinkle, Ernest Jahn of NICAP, and Jim Rigberg and his UFO bookstore.

At the film’s conclusion, the "Iron Curtain" UFO footage is played during the end credits. It is stock footage of astronaut Ed White’s space walk during Gemini 4.
