= Dennis Bowen =

American character actor

- Born: Dennis Keith Bowen; September 9, 1950; Gainesville, Florida, U.S.
- Died: March 9, 2012 (aged 61); Los Angeles, California, U.S.
- Occupation: Actor
- Years active: 1975–2002
- Partner: Judy Holliday
- Children: 1

Dennis Keith Bowen (September 9, 1950 – March 9, 2012) was an American character actor. His filmography included numerous films, more than one hundred television shows, and over one thousand television commercials during his career.

== Early life ==
Bowen was born in Gainesville, Florida, on September 9, 1950.

== Career ==
Bowen served in the United States Navy before pursuing an acting career. Outside of acting, Bowen was a recipient of the Medal of Valor from the California State Fireman's Association. Bowen's film credits included Record City, Van Nuys Blvd., Gas Pump Girls, and Caddyshack II. His best-known television roles included the 1970s ABC television series, Welcome Back, Kotter, in which he had a recurring role as Todd Ludlow.

== Personal life ==
Bowen died on March 9, 2012, at the age of 61. He was survived by his partner, Judy Holliday, and his daughter. Bowen was a resident of the Toluca Lake neighborhood of Los Angeles.

== Filmography ==
=== Film ===
Year	Title	Role	Notes
1977	Record City	Danny	
1979	Van Nuys Blvd.	Greg	
1979	Gas Pump Girls	Roger	
1988	Caddyshack II	Construction Worker	
1989	Lisa	Alison's Boyfriend	
1989	Martians Go Home	Tape Dealer	
1995	Bye Bye Love	Father at Dad's Day Out	
1999	Restraining Order	Cop #2	

=== Television ===
Year	Title	Role	Notes
1975	The Hatfields and the McCoys	Randall McCoy Jr.	Television film
1975–1976	Welcome Back, Kotter	Todd Ludlow	5 episodes
1976	The Dark Side of Innocence	Michael Hancock	Television film
1976	ABC Afterschool Special	Bix	Episode: "Francesca, Baby"
1976	ABC Saturday Comedy Special	Archie Andrews	Episode: "Archie"
1977	Code R	Jerry	Episode: "High Adventure"
1977	Future Cop	Red	Episode: "The Mad Mad Bomber"
1979	How the West Was Won	Lt. Anderson	Episode: "L'Affaire Riel"
1980	The Incredible Hulk	Dale Jenks	Episode: "Deathmask"
1983	CHiPs	Renzlo T. Johnson II	Episode: "Fun House"
1985	Kids Don't Tell	Ted	Television film
1985	Hotel	Jack McAdoo	Episode: "Resolutions"
1985	Command 5	Larry Webster	Television film
1986	Hunter	Buzz Willens	Episode: "The Setup"
1989	Fear Stalk	Officer #2	Television film
1990	Love and Lies	Young Man at Bar	Television film
1991	Santa Barbara	Pilot	Episode #1.1712
1996	Death Benefit	D.A.'s Assistant	Television film
1996	Norma Jean & Marilyn	Tom Kelly	Television film
1997	Team Knight Rider	Scientist	Episode: "The 'A' List"
1997	Breast Men	Happy Doctor	Television film
1997–2001	JAG	Captain Crowley / Nick Keneally	2 episodes
1998	Martial Law	Andy	Episode: "Shanghai Express"
2000, 2001	Diagnosis: Murder	Pilot / Co-Pilot	2 episodes
2002	First Monday	Mr. Moran	Episode: "Crime and Punishment"
