= Gas Pump Girls =

- Directed by: Joel Bender
- Written by: Joel Bender
- Starring: Kirsten Baker; Dennis Bowen; Huntz Hall; Sandy Johnson; Rikki Marin; Ken Lerner
- Distributed by: Cannon Films
- Release date: 1979
- Running time: 86 minutes
- Country: United States
- Language: English
- Budget: $500,000

Gas Pump Girls is a 1979 American comedy film. Directed by Joel Bender, it stars Kirsten Baker as June. Following their high school graduation, June and her friends, while her uncle recovers from a heart attack, take over the operation of his gasoline station, which faces stiff competition from the newer, bigger, more modern station that has recently opened across the street.

== Plot ==
"Five shapely women save a man's failing service station"

June and her friends, who appear topless during their high school graduation, then appear topless in a locker room, agree to help out at the failing gas and service station run by June's uncle Joe.

However, right across the street is another station, run by Mr. Friendly, a devious businessman. His goal is to put his rival out of business.

It seems like fate might be working in the villain's favor. Uncle Joe has been struck by a heart attack and can no longer run the business. When Uncle Joe's doctor tells him he must sell the gasoline station that he has operated for more than 20 years, June decides to take it over and get her friends to work for her as gas-pump attendants. The girls wear uniforms consisting of halter tops and short shorts, labelled either "Regular" or "Super Duper" (for high-octane fuel). Michael and his male friends work as mechanics in the body shop. June also installs a public address (PA) system, over which she announces the station's services, using sexually suggestive phrases and double entendres. Business is soon booming, much to Mr. Friendly's chagrin.

The Vultures, a local motorcycle gang, vandalize the station, but June soon puts her feminine charms to work to recruit them to her cause, putting them to work as her tow truck-driving team.

Mr. Friendly hires two mobsters to murder June. However, when they threaten her, she flips the switch on the PA system, alerting the others. Having returned from towing a vehicle, the Vultures hatch a plan: while the girls pace back and forth, topless, to distract the mobsters, the Vultures, waiting just outside the doorway to the station's office, club the men over the head, knocking them unconscious.

Next, Mr. Friendly convinces the gasoline supplier not to deliver supplies to June's station. Without a product to sell, the station is out of business, until June finds a way to get more fuel to sell; they visit their competitor, asking to have the gas tank of Michael's car filled. As the vehicle is refueled, one of the boys, hidden beneath the car, siphons the gasoline into a storage tank, so that the car seems to hold much more fuel than it needs. By making two visits, using the same vehicle, the friends are able to obtain more regular and high-octane gasoline to sell at their own station. This scheme is successful, but only for the near term, and they are soon out of product again. They are all about to admit defeat until Mr. Friendly pays them an unfriendly visit to mock their attempt to compete against him, and June rallies them.

She intercepts the fuel deliveryman, who tells her to follow him if she wants to see where the president of the fuel company works, but warns her that he refuses to see anyone but oil sheiks.

June and her friends follow the deliveryman, but the security guard at the gate refuses to allow them to enter the company's property. June hits on a plan. The Vultures will don helmets, posing as a security force, and she and the other teens will dress as oil sheiks. This time, the guard permits them to enter, and they are ushered into the president's office. June removes her disguise, and, attracted to her in her brief uniform, the president listens to her story concerning how her friends and she have attempted to save her ailing uncle's family business, despite the unfair competition that Mr. Friendly has posed, which includes his having hired hit men to murder her.

Outraged at Mr. Friendly's conduct, the president discontinues his franchise, and June takes over the Pyramid gas station and garage. Her uncle recovers and returns to manage the business, and June and her friends enjoy their post-graduation freedom.

== Cast ==
- Kirsten Baker - June
- Dennis Bowen - Roger
- Huntz Hall - Uncle Joe
- Sandy Johnson - April
- Leslie King - Jane
- Linda Lawrence - Betty
- Rikki Marin - January
- Steve Bond - Butch
- Ken Lerner - PeeWee
- Dave Shelley - Mr. Friendly
- Joe E. Ross - Bruno
- Mike Mazurki - Moiv
- Jack Jozefson - Mr. Smin
- Cousin Brucie - narrator

== Production ==
Joel Bender met David A. Davies, a Rabbinical student and "a partial money-raiser", on Abduction, they became friends and partners, wrote a script in a few days and brought it to the Cannon Films, who bought the script. Production began at Raleigh Studios.

Art Director George Costello found the gas station with another gas station across the street, at 3201 Marysville Boulevard, Sacramento, California.

Cousin Brucie voices the narration during the opening credits.

"...we had some great looking young ladies in it, and some famous old comedians". - Joel Bender

Gas Pump Girls features a musical number, All of My Friends, with Kirsten Baker, inspired by Olivia Newton-John in Grease.

A couple of "Orthodox Jewish friends" of Joel Bender, including Isaac Blech, from a company called Blockbuster Records, wrote the songs and composed the music, for the soundtrack record.

== Home media ==
The film was released twice on DVD, March 11, 2008 and May 22, 2012. It was later released on Blu-ray on April 30, 2019.
