= Cycle Psycho =

Cycle Psychos
- Theatrical release poster
- Directed by: John Lawrence
- Written by: John Lawrence
- Produced by: John Lawrence
- Starring: Joe Turkel; Stephen Oliver; Sean Kenney; Kitty Vallacher; Tom Drake
- Cinematography: Bill Davies
- Music by: Jerry Styner
- Production company: Cinemation
- Distributed by: Troma Entertainment
- Release date: 1973
- Running time: 80 minutes
- Country: United States
- Language: English

Cycle Psycho (also known as The Bloody Slaying of Sarah Ridelander and Savage Abduction) is a 1973 action thriller exploitation film written and directed by John Lawrence and distributed by Troma Entertainment.

== Plot ==
A businessman hires a psychopath to murder his wife. After he accomplishes the deed, the psychopath blackmails the businessman into finding young girls for him to torture and kill. The man makes a deal with a motorcycle gang to kidnap two young girls for that purpose.

== Cast ==
- Joe Turkel as Harry
- Stephen Oliver as Chelsea Miller
- Sean Kenney as Romeo
- Kitty Vallacher as Faye
- Bill Barney as Irish
- Tom Drake as Dick Ridelander
- Tanis Gallik as Jenny Madison
- Stafford Repp
- Amy Thomson as Lorie
