= Chevy Van (song) =

Single by Sammy Johns

from the album Sammy Johns
- B-side: "Hang My Head and Moan"
- Released: 1973; re-release January 1975
- Genre: Folk rock, country rock
- Length: 2:59 (LP); 2:54 (single)
- Label: GRC
- Songwriter: Sammy Johns
- Producers: Jay Senter, Larry Knechtel

Sammy Johns singles chronology
"Early Morning Love" (1974)	"Chevy Van" (1973)	"Rag Doll" (1975)

"Chevy Van" is a song by American singer and songwriter Sammy Johns, written and sung by Johns. The song was originally released in 1973 by GRC Records on Johns' debut album, which was also released in 1973. The instrumental backing was played by Los Angeles-based session musicians from the Wrecking Crew.

In 1975, the song experienced success across the United States and Canada, reaching #5 on the US Billboard Hot 100 chart, eventually achieving one million sells. It was played primarily on Top 40 radio stations during the 1970s; later re-recordings were done in a country vein.

It was later re-released in 1975. The song details how an unnamed male driver picks up an unnamed female, who then eventually seduces him into a one-night stand in the back of his Chevrolet van. At the end he drops her off "in a town that was so small, you could throw a rock from end to end. A dirt road main street, she walked off in bare feet", and laments "It's a shame I won't be passing through again". The song struck a chord with listeners in the sexually liberated 1970s when Johns released it. The popularity of the song is also reflective of the vansploitation films of the period. The original 1973 version is featured in the 1977 film The Van. On May 5, 1975, the song was certified gold by the RIAA. The song is Johns' only hit.

== Legacy ==
In the years since Johns' version was released, country artists Eric Church, Waylon Jennings, and Sammy Kershaw and rock artists Joe Pernice and Fu Manchu have each released covers of the song. Unlike Johns' original chorus that opens "Cause like a princess she was laying there...", the aforementioned artists sing "Cause like a picture she was laying there..."

== Chart history ==
=== Weekly charts ===
Chart (1975)	Peak position
Australia (Kent Music Report)	74
Canada RPM Top Singles	7
New Zealand (RIANZ)	2
US Billboard Hot 100	5
US Cash Box Top 100	5

=== Year-end charts ===
Chart (1975)	Rank
Canada	79
New Zealand	10
US Billboard Hot 100	48
US Cash Box	72

== See also ==
- List of one-hit wonders in the United States
- Sleeper hit
