= Stephen Oliver (actor) =

American actor (1941–2008)

Stephen Oliver Welzig (November 29, 1941 – April 5, 2008), known as Stephen Oliver, was an American actor.

== Biography ==
Born in Philadelphia, Pennsylvania, Oliver portrayed the character of Lee Webber in the TV series Peyton Place from 1966 to 1968. He later portrayed the character Tom Hudson in early episodes of Bracken's World (1970). He made guest appearances in such other TV series as Starsky and Hutch, CHiPs, The Streets of San Francisco, and appeared in biker movies such as Motorpsycho (1965), Angels from Hell (1968), Werewolves on Wheels (1971) and Cycle Psycho (1973). In addition, Oliver co-starred in drive-in films such as The Van (1977), and Malibu Beach (1978).

== Personal life ==
Oliver was married three times:

1. Lana Wood (1966-1966; annulled)
2. Andrea Cyril (divorced)
3. Anna Geirstottir (divorced)

He has one daughter, four grandchildren, and two great grandchildren through first partner, which were confirmed through DNA testing.

== Death ==
He died on April 5, 2008, in Big Bear City, California at the age of 66 from stomach cancer.

== Filmography ==
=== Film ===
- 1965 - Motorpsycho! as Brahmin
- 1968 - Angels from Hell as Speed
- 1970 - The Naked Zoo as Terry Shaw
- 1971 - Werewolves on Wheels as Adam
- 1973 - Savage Abduction as Chelsea Miller
- 1975 - Fugitive Lovers as Blue Schuyler
- 1977 - The Great Gundown as Arden
- 1977 - The Van as Dugan Hicks
- 1978 - Malibu Beach as Dugan Hicks
- 1980 - Tom Horn as Gentleman Jim Corbett
- 1988 - Tiger Cage as Frank
- 1988 - Assignment: Survive as Survivalist Instructor
- 1988 - A Mission to Kill as Major Steven Henry Miller

=== Television ===
- 1966-1968 - Peyton Place as Lee Webber (143 episodes)
- 1969-1970 - Bracken's World as Tom Hudson (26 episodes)
- 1970 - The Immortal as Nat King
- 1972-1976 - The Streets of San Francisco as Shandy / Mark Dillon / Bret Wilson
- 1977 - Code R as Jacobson
- 1978 - CHiPs as Brad Holmes S2:E12
- 1979 - Starsky and Hutch as Buzzy Boone S4:E13
