= Fern Fitzgerald =

American actress

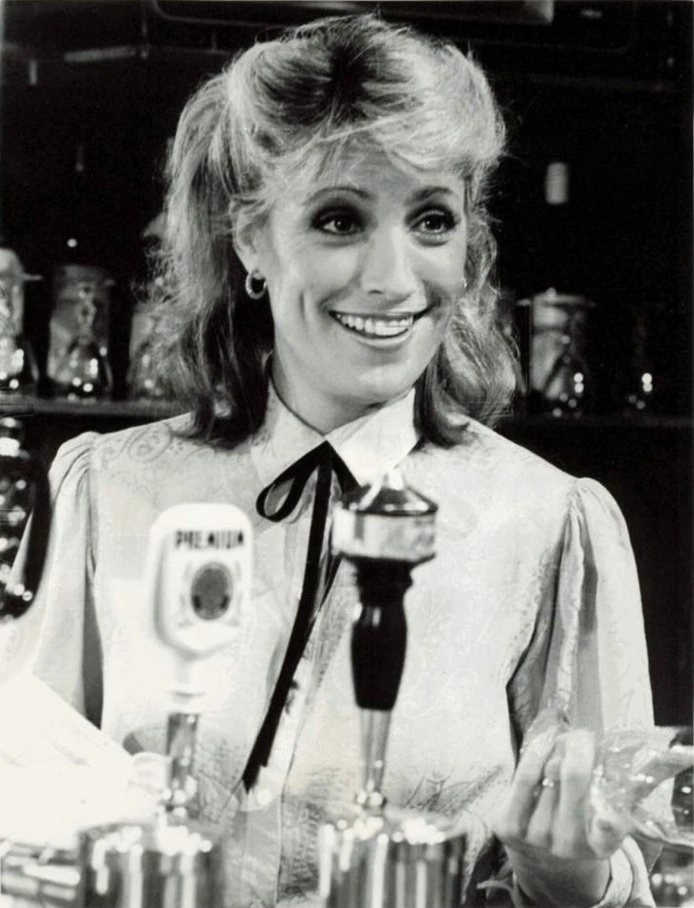
- Fitzgerald as Pat McBride in Archie Bunker's Place (1983)
- Born: January 7, 1947 (age 79); Valley Stream, New York, U.S.
- Occupation: Actress
- Years active: 1979–1996
- Known for: Dallas

Fern Fitzgerald (born January 7, 1947, in Valley Stream, New York) is an American actress, best known for her recurring role as oil cartel businesswoman Marilee Stone in the CBS primetime soap opera Dallas from 1979 to 1989. She guest-starred in a number of other television series, like Archie Bunker's Place, Hill Street Blues, Hotel, Who's the Boss?, Life Goes On, and Seinfeld. In film, Fitzgerald appeared in The Beach Girls (1982). She also appeared in the original productions of Chicago and A Chorus Line on Broadway.

== Filmography ==
- Dallas as Marilee Stone (73 episodes, 1979–1987, 1989)
- A Cry for Love as Barbara (1980)
- Too Close for Comfort as Masseuse (1 episode, 1980)
- Hart to Hart as Female Passenger (1 episode, 1981)
- The Beach Girls as Julie (1982)
- Madame's Place as Rhoda Royale (1 episode, 1982)
- Archie Bunker's Place as Pat McBride (3 episodes, 1983)
- Hill Street Blues (1 episode, 1983)
- Silver Spoons as Corinne Taylor (2 episodes, 1983—1984)
- Stingray as Marcia Finch (1985)
- Scarecrow and Mrs. King as Jill Halsman (1 episode, 1985)
- It's a Living as Louise (1 episode, 1986)
- Hotel as Myra Fields (1 episode, 1986)
- Who's the Boss? as Dr. Isabel Schaeffer (2 episodes, 1985—1986)
- Hunter as Shelly Kurtz (1 episode, 1987)
- The Oldest Rookie as Karen (1 episode, 1987)
- Who Gets the Friends? (1988)
- Nightingales (1988)
- Hooperman (1 episode, 1989)
- They Came from Outer Space as Ramona (1 episode, 1990)
- Shades of LA as Katherine (1 episode, 1991)
- Life Goes On as Robin Benchfield (3 episodes, 1990—1992)
- Vanishing Son (1 episode, 1995)
- Seinfeld as Ms. Wilkie (1 episode, 1996)
