= Werewolves on Wheels =

1971 film by Michel Levesque

- Theatrical release poster
- Directed by: Michel Levesque
- Written by: Michael Levesque; David M. Kaufman
- Produced by: Paul Lewis
- Starring: Stephen Oliver; Severn Darden
- Cinematography: Isidore Mankofsky
- Edited by: Peter Parasheles
- Music by: Don Gere
- Distributed by: Dark Sky Films (US DVD)
- Release date: November 19, 1971
- Running time: 85 minutes
- Country: United States
- Language: English

Werewolves on Wheels is a 1971 American biker horror exploitation film directed by Michel Levesque and starring Stephen Oliver, D.J. Anderson, and Deuce Barry.

== Plot ==
"As it is, the story takes up the tracks of a California biker gang, the Devil's Advocates, as they speed across a barren highway on a drug-infused journey of undisclosed intent. Losing their way, they stop for the night on the grounds of a 'church' tucked away in some hills off the beaten path. Much to their initial pleasure, they are fed by a kindly group of hooded priests before settling into a deep, inebriated stupor."

As a group of bikers moves across the desert, they come across an old church that a Satanic cult has taken over. The cultists give them drugged food and the bikers soon fall asleep. That night the cultists cast a curse on the biker leader's girlfriend that makes her turn into a werewolf after nightfall; she soon infects her boyfriend. The bikers leave the church and begin to be killed off whenever they stop for the night. Things come to a climax when the couple changes in front of the bikers, who quickly kill the beasts. The bikers return to the church to have their revenge, but stop when they see themselves in the cult-procession.

== Cast ==
- Stephen Oliver as Adam
- Donna Anders as Helen (as D.J. Anderson)
- Deuce Barry as Tarot
- William Gray as Pill
- Gray Johnson as Movie
- Barry McGuire as Scarf
- Owen Orr as Mouse
- Anna Lynn Brown as Shirley
- Severn Darden as One

== Production ==
In many scenes, footage was used of real bikers with no experience or training in acting going about their lives as normal. Thus, parts of this film could be regarded as an early experiment in reality as entertainment.
