= Kim Lankford =

American actress

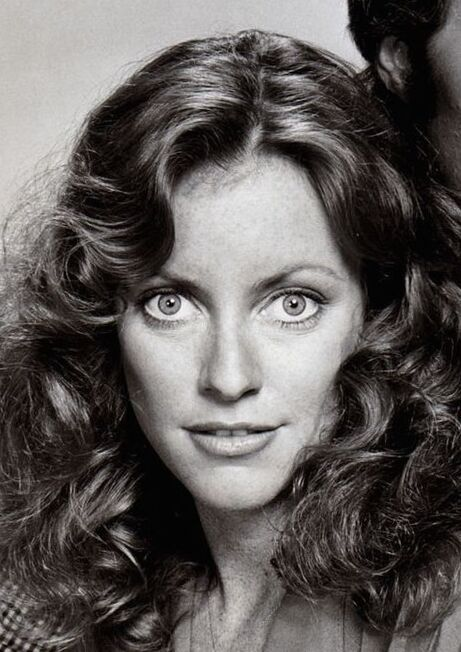
- Lankford in Knots Landing (1979)
- Born: June 14, 1954 (age 72); Montebello, California, U.S.
- Occupations: Businesswoman; actress
- Years active: 1976–2000; 2015

Kim Lankford (born June 14, 1954) is an American businesswoman and retired actress, best known for her role as Ginger Ward on Knots Landing from 1979 to 1983.

== Life and career ==
Lankford was born in Montebello, California. She made her screen debut in the 1976 movie Harry and Walter Go to New York, and later began her television career appearing in episodes of sitcoms such as Happy Days. In 1978, she was cast as the female lead opposite Joe Namath in the short-lived NBC sitcom The Waverly Wonders. Later that year, she played the leading role in the teen comedy film Malibu Beach.

In 1979, Lankford was cast as Ginger Ward, one of the original lead characters, in the CBS prime time soap opera Knots Landing. She starred on the show during the first four seasons, before leaving in 1983. In 1980, she also had a role opposite Chuck Norris in the action film The Octagon, and in the following years co-starred with Don Meredith in the thriller Terror Among Us. After leaving Knots Landing, she guest-starred on Fantasy Island, The Love Boat, and Cheers. In 1988, she had a supporting role in the horror film Cameron's Closet, and was a regular cast member in the ABC detective drama Murphy's Law.

Lankford spent the 1990s playing guest starring roles on television series such as In the Heat of the Night, Chicago Hope and Diagnosis: Murder, as well as appearing in the films Missing Pieces (1992) and Night of the Running Man (1995). In 1996, Lankford was a co-presenter on a cult public-access television cable TV series, "The Count Smokula Show". She reprised her Knots Landing character in Knots Landing: Back to the Cul-de-Sac in 1997. After retiring from acting in 2000, Lankford created her own horse business in Colorado called Kim Lankford's Living Horsemanship.

In the late 1970s and early 1980s, Lankford lived with, and was romantically involved with, Warren Zevon. Lankford was close friends with Susan Berman. Lankford dated Robert Durst, who allegedly murdered Berman in 2000. In 2015, Lankford appeared in the HBO documentary series The Jinx: The Life and Deaths of Robert Durst.

== Filmography ==
=== Film ===
Year	Title	Role	Notes
1976	Harry and Walter Go to New York	Young Girl	
1978	Convoy	Darlene	Cut in post-production
1978	Malibu Beach	Dina	
1980	The Octagon	Nancy	
1981	Terror Among Us	Vickie Stevens	
1988	Cameron's Closet	Dory Lansing	
1992	Missing Pieces	Sally	
1995	Night of the Running Man	Waitress	
1996	Street Corner Justice	Jenny Connor	
1996	For Goodness Sake II		Short film
1997	Get to the Heart: The Barbara Mandrell Story		Television film
1998	Mixed Blessings		
2015	Dead of Winter: The Donner Party	Tamsen Donner	Television film

=== Television ===
Year	Title	Role	Notes
1976	Police Woman	Kate	Episodes: "Task Force: Cop Killer: Part 1" and "Task Force: Cop Killer: Part 2"
1977	Happy Days	Sheena	Episode: "A Shot in the Dark"
1977	Busting Loose	Sharon	Episodes: "The Decision: Part 1" and "The Decision: Part 2"
1978	The Waverly Wonders	Connie Rafkin	Series regular, 9 episodes
1978	Man from Atlantis		Episode: "The Siren"
1978	The Hardy Boys/Nancy Drew Mysteries	Alice Smith	Episode: "Campus Terror"
1979–1983	Knots Landing	Ginger Ward	Series regular, 75 episodes
1982, 84	Fantasy Island	Fancy Summerfield / Sandy	Episodes: "Roller Derby Dolls/Thanks a Million" and "Lady's Choice/Skin Deep"
1984	Finder of Lost Loves	Jeanine Prescott	Episode: "White Lies"
1984	Cheers	Maxine	Episode: "Sam Turns the Other Cheek"
1978–1984	The Love Boat	Carol Kelsey / Deanna Ellis / Anne Parker	S8 E13/
1985	The Hitchhiker	Rae Bridgeman	Episode: "A Time for Rifles"
1987	Hunter	Charlene Lindquist	Episode: "The Cradle Will Rock"
1987	The Law & Harry McGraw	Karen Stillman	Episode: "Murder by Landslides"
1988	Jake and the Fatman	Cynthia Covington	Episode: "Rhapsody in Blue"
1988–1989	Murphy's Law	Marissa Danforth	Series regular, 12 episodes
1990	Dream On	Hannah Stone	Episode: "Premarital Ex"
1991	Paradise	Beckie	Episode: "A Bullet Through the Heart"
1991	In the Heat of the Night	Tamara Pollard	Episode: "Liar's Poker"
1991	Silk Stalkings	Muriel Hayes	Episode: "Hardcopy"
1992	Bodies of Evidence	Pam Charles	Episode: "The Cold Light of Day"
1996	Land's End	Jenny's Mother	Episode: "Jenny"
1997	Chicago Hope	Leslie Bowman	Episode: "Leggo My Ego"
1997	Knots Landing: Back to the Cul-de-Sac	Ginger Ward	Miniseries
1995, 1997	Diagnosis: Murder	Chelsea Drew / Lois Claire	Episodes: "Death in the Daytime" and "A Mime Is a Terrible Thing to Waste"
2000	Martial Law	Dr. Geller	Episodes: "Final Conflict: Part 1" and "Final Conflict: Part 2"
2015	The Jinx	Herself	Miniseries
