= There Is No 13 =

1974 film

- Directed by: William Sachs
- Written by: William Sachs
- Produced by: Robert Boggs; William Sachs
- Starring: Mark Damon
- Cinematography: Ralf D. Bode
- Edited by: George T. Norris
- Music by: Riz Ortolani
- Release date: June 1974
- Running time: 91 minutes
- Country: United States
- Language: English

There Is No 13 is a 1974 American surrealist drama film directed by William Sachs and starring Mark Damon. It was entered into the 24th Berlin International Film Festival.

== Premise ==
During the Vietnam War, a soldier remembers the 12 women he has been with. But, there is no 13.

== Cast ==
- Mark Damon as George Thomas
- Margaret Markov as Number Eleven
- Harvey Lembeck as Older George
- Jean Jennings as Number Twelve
- Lee Moore as Dr. Honneycutt
- Reuben Schafer as Mr. A.
- Bonnie Inch as Rosie

== Reception ==
When the film screened at Berlin International Film Festival, it polarized the audiences due to it being American, dealing with the Vietnam war. During the screening, there were protests, with some people shouting and someone turning the light in the auditorium on and off a few times. A judge told Sachs that the film should have won a Golden Bear award "because it was the only unusual film" at the festival, and that it didn't only because the jury was worried about the public reaction to the winning film being so controversial.

== Quotes ==
Remarkable fantasy film [that] gives indications of a new direction in film storytelling, is influenced in his structure by the synthesis of reality and imagination of Fellini, Resnais and Buñuel. Yet this style has been further developed. It is a deeply touching film, (...) surprisingly experienced as a striking and stirring film about the human condition. The distantiation of Brecht is applied in a masterful manner.

— Piet Ruivenkamp, member of Jury at Berlin Film Festival 1974

I was doing post production on my first film in Rome. There were three cutting rooms in a row. I was in the middle one. Antonioni was on one side and Fellini on the other. I thought if I could touch both walls at the same time I would be injected with genius. Too bad my arms were too short...

— William Sachs, about editing There Is No 13

Probably Sachs’ best film, certainly his most profound.

— Sam Weisberg, article about Sachs' films.

== See also ==
- List of American films of 1974
