= The Revengers (film) =

1972 film by Daniel Mann

- Theatrical release poster by Tom Jung
- Directed by: Daniel Mann
- Written by: Wendell Mayes; Story: Steven W. Carabatsos
- Produced by: Martin Rackin
- Starring: William Holden; Ernest Borgnine; Woody Strode; Roger Hanin; Susan Hayward
- Cinematography: Gabriel Torres
- Edited by: Walter Hannemann; Juan José Marino
- Music by: Pino Calvi
- Production companies: Cinema Center Films; Estudios Churubusco Azteca S.A.
- Distributed by: National General Pictures
- Release date: June 21, 1972
- Running time: 106 minutes
- Countries: United States; Mexico
- Language: English

The Revengers is a 1972 American Western film written by Wendell Mayes based upon a story by Steven W. Carabatsos. The film was directed by Daniel Mann and stars William Holden and Ernest Borgnine.

== Plot ==
The Civil War is over and Medal of Honor winner John Benedict is a Colorado rancher returning to his wife and four children with his ranch hand, Free. As they arrive they are greeted by some town representatives and Lieutenant Able, who is intent in recruiting John's son Morgan to West Point. John is prompted by Free to ask Morgan whether he would like to go to West Point and his son agrees to go.

The next day while John is out hunting the mountain lion that his son Morgan shot, some Comanche shoot his dog and steal his horse. John races back to the ranch but arrives just in time to see the Comanche riding away from the ranch. He finds his family have been murdered and Free mortally wounded. Just before Free dies, he tells John that the leader of the Comanches was a white man, indicating that all is not as it seems with the raid.

Vowing vengeance, John joins a posse hunting the Comancheros. He proceeds into Texas on his own, instructing Sheriff Whitcomb to sell his stock and wire him the money. John proceeds to a prison camp in Mexico and decides to recruit his own posse from the prisoners under the guise of finding workers for his mine. He selects six hardened criminals: Hoop, a former Comanchero; Job, an escaped slave; Chamaco, a young gunslinger; Cholo, a reformed bandit; Quiberon, a womaniser; and Zweig, a German known for his strength. John frees the gang and promises a reward if they join him. They agree but then double-cross John, except for Job, who agrees to join his mission. The others steal John's money and ride away, returning later that night after having spent all of the money and agree to remain with John. John questions Hoop who informs him that the Comanchero leader is called Tarp.

The group quickly discover Tarp and his band and attack the base. While they are successful in defeating the Indians, Tarp manages to escape. John rides off after Tarp and frees the men from their pledge, however they all decide to proceed with John. The hunt for Tarp takes years and John bonds with the men. After a few years roaming the west searching for Tarp, John encounters his former friend Sheriff Whitcomb who has become a US Marshal. Whitcomb is shocked to see how brutal John has become and declines a drink from his old friend telling John that his family would be ashamed of him. John rides away from the group to drink alone in a saloon. The men catch up with their leader and Chamaco queries John about his family. The young man has bonded with John and sees him as a father figure but when he broaches the topic that John could be his father, John angrily dismisses him. Chamaco responds by gunning down John and seemingly killing him. The group disbands with Job instructing Hoop not to try and steal from John's body. The barkeeper and his daughter realize John is still alive.

John is taken to Elizabeth Reilly, who nurses him back to full health, saying the bullet barely missed his heart and exited through his armpit. She falls in love with him and asks him to stay, but John departs intent on finally locating Tarp and killing him. En route he stops to re-shoe his horse but is captured by commandant of the prison camp that he liberated his gang from. Later Hoop encounters Chamaco running his own bar. Hoop discloses that he knows John has been captured, and Chamaco restores the gang to rescue John. They pull off the rescue, and John tells Chamaco "You missed my heart by one inch. Now any son of mine can learn to shoot better than that."

Hoop discloses to John that Tarp has been captured by the army and is due to be moved to a fort where he will be tried for his crimes. John sets out to intercept Tarp, and the men join him. En route they find a squad of dead soldiers who were ambushed and massacred by the Comanche. They visit the fort and find the Lieutenant badly wounded; the fort is surrounded by Comanche who want Tarp back. John threatens to shoot Tarp and send his body out, which could end the siege, but the Lieutenant refuses him. The gang join with the soldiers to fight off the Comanche attack. John lays dynamite that the Comanche must ride through and the soldiers prepare for the attack. The lieutenant is badly wounded and John rescues him just as Chamaco is mortally wounded saving John from the next wave of the attack. The gang eventually beat back the Comanche and Chamaco dies in John's arms. John angrily breaks into Tarp's cell and despite Hoop's urging to shoot Tarp, he relents and walks away. Cholo asks John why he didn't kill Tarp, but John indicates he no longer has revenge in his heart. John rides away and fires his gun in salute to the five remaining members of the gang, deciding to return to his ranch.

== Cast ==
- William Holden as John Benedict
- Ernest Borgnine as Hoop
- Woody Strode as Job
- Roger Hanin as Quiberon
- Susan Hayward as Elizabeth Reilly
- René Koldehoff as Zweig
- Jorge Martínez de Hoyos as "Cholo"
- Arthur Hunnicutt as "Free State"
- Warren Vanders as Tarp
- Larry Pennell as Arny
- John Kelly as Whitcomb
- James Daughton as Morgan
- Scott Holden as Lieutenant
- Lorraine Chanel as Mrs. Benedict
- Jorge Luke as Chamaco
- Raúl Pérez Prieto as The Prison Warden
- Carlos Arnez Rocha

== Background ==
Produced by Cinema Center Films, the film was distributed by National General Pictures and Estudios Churubusco Azteca with an original theatrical release in 1972. The film was commercially re-released in 1979 on NBC's Tuesday Night at the Movies. The film was shot in Mexico in 1971, and marked both the American film debut of German actor Reinhard Kolldehoff, and Susan Hayward's return from voluntary retirement.

== Reception ==
The film, which got mixed reviews, was a box office bomb. Judith Crist of New York magazine offered that the film was "another kind of high-class trash ... with William Holden as a proud rancher out to get the villains..." Dave Billington of the Montreal Gazette compared the film with other genre films, writing that while the film does not come near to Return of the Seven or The Dirty Dozen "in smoothness and clean direction, it does fill in a hot afternoon with some cool entertainment." He shares that Holden as the owner of a horse ranch is seen as "rather too coy" in the opening few minutes when his character's wife, sons, daughters, and ranch hands are all murdered before he finally loses his temper. Billington writes that of the six killers hired to help Holden seek revenge, "the two best are certainly Ernest Borgnine and Woody Strode"... noting further that this was "probably Borgnine's best performance since Marty".

Ernest Borgnine wrote in his autobiography, "This western was an attempt to return audiences to the dark territory of The Wild Bunch with a dash of The Dirty Dozen. We had Bill Holden again, and Daniel Mann—who'd directed Willard—tried real hard, but we didn't make it."
