= The Waverly Wonders =

Television series

- Genre: Sitcom
- Created by: William Bickley; Michael Warren
- Starring: Joe Namath; Kim Lankford; Charles Bloom; Tierre Turner; Ben Piazza
- Country of origin: United States
- Original language: English
- No. of seasons: 1
- No. of episodes: 4 (9 total, 5 unaired)

Production
- Running time: 30 minutes
- Production company: Lorimar Productions

Original release
- Network: NBC
- Release: September 7 – October 6, 1978

Joe Namath (top center) and The Waverly Wonders

The Waverly Wonders is an American sitcom starring Joe Namath that aired Fridays at 8:00 pm on NBC from September 7 to October 6, 1978.

== Premise ==
Conceived as a vehicle for Namath (who had retired from the Los Angeles Rams after the 1977 NFL season), the show focused on the misadventures of Joe Casey, a washed-up professional basketball player who now teaches history at Waverly High School (in Eastville, Wisconsin) and coached the school's basketball team, the Waverly Wonders.

Casey wasn't much of a teacher (he knew nothing about history) and his team wasn't much on the court (they hadn't won a game in three years); about the only decent player they had was a girl, Connie (Kim Lankford). Other "Wonders" included Tate (Charles Bloom), Faguzzi (Joshua Greenrock) and Parks (Tierre Turner). Ben Piazza co-starred as stodgy former coach George Benton, who served as a foil to Casey.

== Cast ==
- Joe Namath as Joe Casey
- Kim Lankford as Connie Rafkin
- Charles Bloom as John Tate
- Joshua Greenrock as Tony Faguzzi
- James Staley as Alan Kerner
- Tierre Turner as Hasty Parks
- Gwynne Gilford as Linda Harris
- Ben Piazza as George Benton

== Episode list ==
| No. | Title | Directed by | Written by | Original release date |
|---|---|---|---|---|
| 1 | "Pilot" | Bill Persky | William Bickley & Michael Warren | September 7, 1978 |
| 2 | "Pied Piper" | Dick Martin | Thad Mumford & Dan Wilcox | September 22, 1978 |
| 3 | "Tate vs. Tate" | Dick Martin | Thad Mumford & Dan Wilcox | September 29, 1978 |
| 4 | "Rafkin's Victory Dance" | Dick Martin | Story by : Roger Garrett & Sally Wade; Teleplay by : Deborah Zoe Dawson & Victoria Johns | October 6, 1978 |
| 5 | "Joe Checks Out the Librarian" | Dick Martin | Alvin Eisenstock & Larry Mintz | N/A |
| 6 | "The Kiss" | Dick Martin | Story by : Stephen Neigher; Teleplay by : Dennis Koenig, Thad Mumford, John Rappaport and Dan Wilcox | N/A |
| 7 | "Joe Goes to Press" | Dick Martin | Deborah Zoe Dawson & Victoria Johns | N/A |
| 8 | "The Revolution" | Dick Martin | Jim Rogers | N/A |
| 9 | "Mock Marriage" | Dick Martin | Story by : Brook Smith; Teleplay by : Brook Smith and Thad Mumford & Dan Wilcox | N/A |

== Ratings ==
Up against Donny and Marie on ABC and Wonder Woman on CBS, The Waverly Wonders drew poor ratings. A total of nine episodes were produced. However, only three were shown from September 22 through October 6, 1978. Less than two months after The Waverly Wonders failed, a new show with a similar premise -- The White Shadow—started its three-year run as a 60-minute comedy-drama on CBS. Meanwhile, at NBC, its time slot was replaced by a more successful TV series, Diff'rent Strokes, which in its first year, got to Number 27 of 114 prime time shows that year.

Namath never starred in another TV series, although he did do guest spots on such programs as The Love Boat and Fantasy Island.

Larry Hagman was originally offered the role of Joe Casey, but instead chose to play J.R. Ewing on Dallas.
