= Gwynne Gilford =

American actress (born 1946)

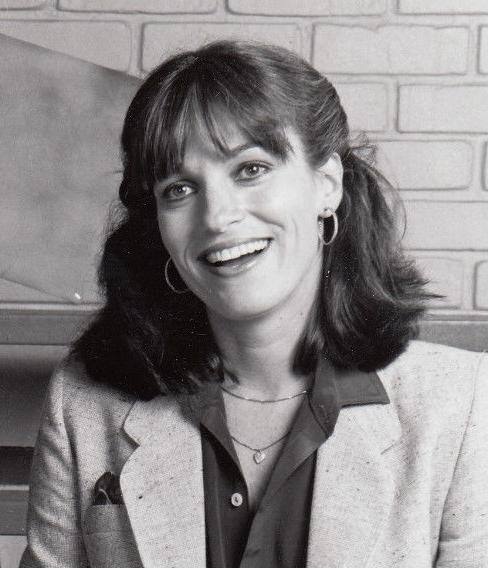
- Gilford on The Waverly Wonders in 1978
- Born: Gloria Gwynne Gilford; July 27, 1946 (age 80); Los Angeles, California, U.S.
- Occupations: Actress (former); Psychotherapist (current)
- Years active: 1969–1987 (as an actress)
- Spouse: Robert Pine (m. 1969)
- Children: 2, including Chris
- Mother: Anne Gwynne

Gloria Gwynne Gilford (born July 27, 1946) is an American psychotherapist and former actress. She appeared in several television series in the 1970s and 1980s, including A New Kind of Family, The Young Lawyers and The Waverly Wonders, and had roles in the films Beware! The Blob (1972), Satan's School for Girls (1973), Ruby and Oswald (1978), Fade to Black (1980), Kate's Secret (1986) and Masters of the Universe (1987).

Gilford is the daughter of actress Anne Gwynne (born Marguerite Gwynne Trice) and entertainment lawyer Max M. Gilford. According to Gilford, her mother would not allow her to act in film as a child.

Gilford studied at the University of California, Los Angeles (UCLA) and in New York. She played Abby Stone, a divorcée and head of the household, in the 1979 comedy A New Kind of Family.

She is married to actor Robert Pine. They are the parents of the actor Chris Pine and Katherine Pine. After retiring from acting, she and Katherine studied to become practicing psychotherapists.
