= Blind Date (1984 film) =

1984 film by Nico Mastorakis

- Directed by: Nico Mastorakis
- Written by: Nico Mastorakis; Fred C. Perry
- Produced by: Nico Mastorakis
- Starring: Kirstie Alley; Joseph Bottoms; James Daughton; Keir Dullea; Lana Clarkson
- Cinematography: Andreas Bellis (as Andrew Bellis)
- Edited by: George Rosenburg
- Music by: Stanley Myers
- Distributed by: New Line Cinema
- Release date: June 1984
- Running time: 103 minutes
- Countries: United States; Greece
- Language: English

Blind Date, also known as Deadly Seduction, is a 1984 independent erotic thriller film directed by B-film maker Nico Mastorakis. It stars Kirstie Alley, Joseph Bottoms, James Daughton, Marina Sirtis, Valeria Golino, and Lana Clarkson.

== Premise ==
When Jonathan Ratcliff (Joseph Bottoms) suddenly becomes blind, doctors fit him with an experimental electronic device designed to partially restore his sight. With his renewed vision, he witnesses a murder and must stop a serial killer.

== Cast ==
- Joseph Bottoms as Jonathan Ratcliff
- Kirstie Alley as Claire Simpson
- James Daughton as Dave
- Lana Clarkson as Rachel
- Keir Dullea as Dr. Steiger
- Charles Nicklin as Robert
- Michael Howe as Subway Gang Member
- Gerard Kelly as Subway Gang Member
- Gerry Sundquist as Subway Gang Member
- Marina Sirtis as Hooker
- Kathy Hill and Louis Sheldon as Murdered Couple
- Antigoni Amanitou as First Victim (credited as Antigone Amanitis)
- Noelle Simpson as Final Victim
- Danos Lygizos as Production Manager
- Ankie Grelson as Rachel's Friend
- Valeria Golino as Girl in Bikini
- Ali Spanoghe as Girl in Bikini
- Maria Marinelli as Girl in Bikini
- Yvette Jarvis as Girl in Bikini
- Laura Rozos as Girl in Bikini
