= C.B. Hustlers =

C. B. Hustlers
- Theatrical release poster
- Directed by: Stu Segall
- Written by: John Alderman; John F. Goff; Martin Gatsby
- Produced by: Stu Segall; Rochelle Weisberg
- Starring: Uschi Digard; John F. Goff; Richard Kennedy; John Alderman
- Cinematography: Ken Gibb
- Edited by: Warren Hamilton Jr.
- Release date: 1976
- Running time: 85 minutes
- Country: United States
- Language: English

C. B. Hustlers is a 1976 American action-adventure/comedy film directed by Stu Segall. Although the film has been referred to as a vansploitation film, vans play a smaller role than in other films of that genre.

== Plot ==
A couple known only by their aliases 'Dancer' and 'Scuzz' are a married pair of drifters who make a living by employing a trio of loose young women, known as "the C.B. Hustlers". They travel up and down the I-5 expressway in southern California in two separate vans where the young women pick up truck drivers and other travelers at rest stop areas and truck depots where they charge them $25 each for sexual favors, with Dancer and Scuzz receiving 40% of the Hustlers' profits. They communicate with each other and their clients on their C.B. short-wave radios by code talk to make appointments with their trucker clients. They stay one step ahead of the law by the truckers giving them radio advance warnings of "smokies" (police) in the area. In public, to avoid unwanted attention, Dancer and Scuzz go by their real names of "Mr. and Mrs. Turner" and always introduce the three young women as their daughters.

Small town sheriff Elrod P. Ramsey cannot catch the Hustlers in the act, so he employs two men, Boots Clayborn and Mountain Dean, who own and operate the local newspaper, to investigate and follow the Hustlers. While Mountain sees this as a potential story for his newspaper and to advance his career, Boots meets and soon becomes enamored of one of the Hustlers and tries to help them stay one step ahead of the law.

== Cast ==
- John F. Goff (credited as Jake Barnes) as Boots Clayborn
- Richard Kennedy (credited as Edward Roehm) as Mountain Dean
- John Alderman as 'Dancer'/Mr. Turner
- Jacqueline Giroux (credited as Valdesta) as 'Scuzz'/Mrs. Turner
- Uschi Digard (credited as Elke Vann) as Dee Dee; C.B. Hustler
- Janus Blythe (credited as Janice Jordan) as Silky; C.B. Hustler
- Catherine Barkley as the Blonde C.B. Hustler
- John Tull (credited as Lance Longworth) as Moonshine
- Douglas Gudbye as Hogbreath
- Bruce Kimball (credited as Michael Alden) as Sheriff Elrod P. Ramsey

== Reception ==
After its re-release on DVD in 2003, the film received mainly negative reviews that criticized mainly its cinematography and script.

== See also ==
- List of American films of 1976
