= Sammy Johns (album) =

Studio album by Sammy Johns
- Released: 1973
- Studio: Mastered at the Sound Pit (Atlanta, Georgia)
- Genre: Country rock, folk
- Length: 33:02
- Label: General Recording
- Producer: Jay Senter, Jefferson Lee, Larry Knechtel

Sammy Johns chronology
Sammy Johns (1973)	Golden Classics (1994)

Sammy Johns is the debut studio album by American singer and songwriter Sammy Johns. The album featured Johns' only successful single, "Chevy Van," which did not become a hit until two years after this album's release.

In 1996, Sammy Kershaw did a cover of "Chevy Van" on his album Politics, Religion and Her.

== Track listing ==
No.	Title	Length
1.	"Early Morning Love"	3:10
2.	"Chevy Van"	2:59
3.	"Jenny"	4:04
4.	"Rag Doll"	3:20
5.	"Hand My Head and Moan"	3:16
6.	"Friends of Mine"	3:38
7.	"America"	3:58
8.	"Holy Mother, Aging Father"	3:04
9.	"Let the Sun Shine"	2:41
10.	"Way Out Jesus"	2:52

== Personnel ==
- Lead Vocals, Acoustic Guitar: Sammy Johns
- Drums and Percussion: Jim Gordon
- Bass guitar, keyboards and guitar: Larry Knechtel
- Guitar: James Burton, Art Munson, Dean Parks
- Bass guitar: Chuck Rainey
- Pedal Steel Guitar: Buddy Emmons
- Keyboards: Mike Melvoin
- Background Vocals: Lamont Meredith, The Blackberries, Herb Pedersen
- Horns: Chuck Findley

== Charts ==
Year	Album	Chart positions
Year	Album	US
1973	Sammy Johns	148

=== Singles ===
Year	Single	Chart positions
Year	Single	US Pop
1975	"Chevy Van"	5
