= A Mission to Kill =

1988 film

A Mission to Kill is a low budget 1988 action film featuring Vietnam War sequences that was written and directed by Sean MacGregor with a story by William Smith. The film also has been released under the titles Nightmares of Nam and The Kill Machine. MacGregor and Smith had also collaborated on Gentle Savage.

A former officer assigned to the Provincial Reconnaissance Unit returns home where he is put in, then escapes from a mental hospital.

== Cast ==
Steve Oliver ... Major Steven Henry 'Hank' Miller
Chris Casamassa ... Young Hank Miller
Marcy Bond ... Samantha
Doug Shalin ... Dr. Blair
William Smith ... Boris Catuli
