= Sammy Johns =

American singer and songwriter (1946–2013)

- Born: Sammy Reginald Johns; February 7, 1946; Charlotte, North Carolina, U.S.
- Died: January 4, 2013 (aged 66) Gastonia, North Carolina, U.S.
- Genres: Folk rock, soft rock
- Occupations: Musician, songwriter
- Instruments: Vocals, guitar
- Years active: 1970–2013
- Labels: General Recording Corporation, Warner-Curb, New World, Elektra

Sammy Reginald Johns (February 7, 1946 – January 4, 2013) was an American singer-songwriter known for his 1975 hit song "Chevy Van", which was originally released in 1973. The song was certified gold by the RIAA on May 5, 1975.

== Career ==
Johns was born in Charlotte, North Carolina. His father gave him a guitar when he was nine. While attending Belmont High School in Belmont, North Carolina, Johns joined the Devilles in his teenage years. The group performed locally and made a few records for Dixie Records. Johns moved to Atlanta, where he signed with General Recording in 1973. His first solo recording was "Early Morning Love" (1973).

"Chevy Van" (1975) reached No. 5 on the US Billboard Hot 100 chart and remained on the chart for 17 weeks. The song had been recorded in 1973, but was initially shelved and only released after 18 months with the album. The song sold three million copies, and is credited for an increase in van sales the following year. In Canada, the song reached No. 7 on the RPM Magazine charts.

The song and an album led to a contract with Warner Curb Records to produce a soundtrack for the 1977 film The Van at the height of the Vansploitation genre. In an interview with WBT radio personality Keith Larson, Johns was paraphrased as saying "the song wasn't about a specific woman he met – but a compilation of events."

Johns switched to Elektra, where he issued singles such as "Common Man" and "Love Me off the Road". In his later career, he was mainly known as a composer rather than as a performer, as many covered versions of his songs became successful. John Conlee's cover version of "Common Man" reached number 1. Conlee made the song his theme song. Johns' songs have also been covered by Waylon Jennings, Sammy Kershaw, Conway Twitty (his final Billboard No. 1, "Desperado Love") and Fu Manchu. After Jennings sang Johns' song "America" at a celebration of the restoration of the Statue of Liberty in 1985, the single was nominated for country song of the year.

== Death ==
Johns died on January 4, 2013, at Gaston Memorial Hospital in Gastonia, North Carolina, at the age of 66.

== Discography ==
=== Albums ===
Year	Album	US	Label
1973	Sammy Johns (LP)	148	General Recording
1977	Sammy Johns Sings "The Van" / Original Motion Picture Sound Track (LP)	—	Warner Brothers
1994	Golden Classics (CD)	—	Collectables
2000	Honky Tonk Moon (CD)	—	Southern Tracks

=== Singles ===
Year	Single	Chart Positions					RIAA	Album
Year	Single	US	US AC	US Country	AUS	CAN	RIAA	Album
1974	"Early Morning Love"	68	19	79	56	79	—	Sammy Johns
1974	"Chevy Van"	5	—	—	74	7	Gold	Sammy Johns
1975	"Rag Doll"	52	34	—	—	—	—	Sammy Johns
1976	"Peas in a Pod"	— (Note: "Peas in a Pod" reached number 131 on the Record World singles chart.)	11	—	—	—	—	Sammy Johns Sings "The Van"
1980	"Falling for You"	103	—	—	—	—	—	—N/a
1981	"Common Man"	—	—	50	—	—	—	—N/a
1988	"Chevy Van" (re-release)	—	—	80	—	—	—	—N/a

== Quotes ==
That was the era of hippies, with free love and all that. I was sort of a hippie – a conservative hippie.

— Sammy Johns, interviewed by Keith Larson in May 2012 about recording Chevy Van.

Chevy Van, a song about a loose-loving man who picks up a woman while he's on the road, struck a loud chord with listeners in the sexually liberated '70s when Johns released it mid-decade.

— Linda Seida, Biography about Sammy Johns.

== See also ==
List of one-hit wonders in the United States
