= My Tutor =

1983 film by George Bowers

- Movie poster
- Directed by: George Bowers
- Written by: Joe Roberts
- Produced by: Michael D. Castle; Marilyn Jacobs Tenser
- Starring: Caren Kaye; Matt Lattanzi; Kevin McCarthy; Bruce Bauer; Clark Brandon; Arlene Golonka; Crispin Glover
- Cinematography: Mac Ahlberg
- Edited by: Sidney Wolinsky
- Music by: Webster Lewis
- Distributed by: Crown International Pictures
- Release date: March 4, 1983
- Running time: 97 minutes
- Country: United States
- Language: English
- Box office: $22,587,000

My Tutor is a 1983 American sex comedy film directed by George Bowers. The film focuses on high school graduates (including Matt Lattanzi and Crispin Glover) as they attempt to lose their virginity during the summer vacation before college, and one's eventual relationship with his French tutor (Caren Kaye).

== Plot ==
The movie opens with scenes of an aerobics class juxtaposed with a classroom of students taking an examination. The movie's two protagonists are featured in these scenes, with Terry Green (Kaye) participating in the aerobics and Bobby Chrystal (Lattanzi) taking, not very well, it turns out, his last high school final, in French.

At first, Bobby's main goal for the summer before college appears to be losing his virginity, if not with his unrequited high school crush, Bonnie (Amber Denyse Austin), who dates a college student, then with any takers. Soon, though, the poor results of the French final are in, and Bobby must take a make-up examination and score at least 85% to retain his acceptance at his wealthy lawyer father's alma mater, Yale University. Mr. Chrystal (Kevin McCarthy) hires Terry, a skilled French tutor, to live in the Chrystal home during the summer and work with Bobby on passing his exam. In addition to her regular compensation, Mr. Chrystal offers Terry a bonus payment of $10,000 should Bobby pass.

Terry and Bobby begin working together, but Bobby's lack of interest in French and Yale soon becomes apparent. His real goal is to attend UCLA and study astronomy. Terry is sympathetic, but reminds Bobby that wherever he goes to college, he must pass his French final. With Terry's help, Bobby begins to make some progress.

At night, after she thinks everyone in the Chrystal home is asleep, Terry uses the family's pool to skinny dip. However, Bobby sees her one night and begins watching her regularly (especially as his group of friends fail several attempts to lose their virginity). After one such evening, Bobby follows Terry back to her room, only to have her sneak up behind him and surprise him. Terry gently admonishes Bobby for spying on her, but they have a mutual attraction. After yet another evening out with his friends, Bobby returns home to find an upset Terry, who had earlier discovered her on-and-off-again boyfriend cheating on her. Terry later heads to the pool for her regular swim. She sees Bobby waiting for her, and she pulls him into the pool with her, and the two begin a love affair.

The summer's end approaches, and Bobby has to take his French examination. Despite Terry's attempts to keep their relationship casual, Bobby has developed strong feelings for Terry and resists her insistence that the affair end once he takes his exam. Matters worsen when Mr. Chrystal, who himself lusts for Terry, sees his son and Terry kissing one night. After Bobby successfully passes the test with a score of 91%, Mr. Chrystal reveals to Bobby his promise to pay Terry the $10,000 bonus, implying that Terry's affection for Bobby was driven by greed. Bobby angrily confronts his father about his overbearing ways and tells him he will attend UCLA to study astronomy. Now that he is an adult, he will no longer allow his father to dominate every aspect of his life. He proceeds to storm out to find Terry. He confronts her with the information, calling her a hooker and flees after Terry angrily denies the accusation.

Later, Bobby seeks out Bonnie, his old crush, and, using his newfound confidence with women, persuades her to begin dating him. Terry prepares to leave the Chrystal home, and Bobby approaches her to say goodbye. He apologizes for his rash accusations and then tells her he will never forget her. Terry tells him matter-of-factly that she will never forget him. The two share one last kiss, and Terry drives off. Bobby leaps into the air, looking forward to the future.

== Cast ==
- Caren Kaye as Terry Green
- Matt Lattanzi as Bobby Chrystal
- Kevin McCarthy as Mr. Chrystal
- Clark Brandon as Billy
- Bruce Bauer as Don Sylvester
- Arlene Golonka as Mrs. Chrystal
- Crispin Glover as Jack
- Amber Denyse Austin as Bonnie
- John Vargas as Manuel
- Maria Melendez as Maria
- Graem McGavin as Sylvia
- Jewel Shepard as Girl In Phone Booth
- Shelley Taylor Morgan as Louisa
- Kitten Natividad as Ana Maria

== Production ==
The pool and house used are on the grounds of Owlwood in Holmby Hills.

Caren Kaye admitted she had trepidations doing her first nude scene. "I had psyched myself up that this was just one other part of the movie, that's all. We were very close with the camera man, camera operator and the director the three men who were in the room. I would have preferred that they were all women, but I had no choice. It went smoothly, but it wasn't easy."

== Reception ==
The distributors spent more than $3 million on television advertising and the film earned rentals of $7 million. My Tutor has a 37% approval on Rotten Tomatoes.
