= Ralf D. Bode =

American cinematographer (1941–2001)

- Born: Ralf Detlef Bode; March 31, 1941; Berlin, Germany
- Died: February 27, 2001 (aged 59); Santa Monica, California, U.S.
- Education: University of Vermont; Yale School of Drama
- Occupation: Cinematographer
- Years active: 1972–2001

Ralf Detlef Bode, ASC (March 31, 1941 – February 27, 2001) was a German-born American cinematographer. He was nominated for the Academy Award for Best Cinematography for his work on Coal Miner's Daughter (1980). He was also a two-time Primetime Emmy Award nominee.

== Life and career ==
Born in Berlin, Germany, Bode moved with his family to Vermont in 1954, when he was 14 years old. A graduate of the University of Vermont, he initially started off as an actor and enrolled at Yale School of Drama. He also served as a photographer in the United States Army.

Bode did the cinematography for films Saturday Night Fever, Gorky Park, The Accused, Uncle Buck and Don Juan DeMarco. He was an uncredited second unit cinematographer for Rocky, notably shooting the scenes in which Sylvester Stallone runs up the steps of the Philadelphia Museum of Art.

He received an Academy Award nomination for his work on Coal Miner's Daughter, as well as two Emmy nominations, for Gypsy and for Annie.

Bode died of lung cancer on February 27, 2001, at age 59 at his home in Santa Monica, California.

== Filmography ==
=== Film ===
Year	Title	Director	Notes
1972	The Stoolie	John G. Avildsen; George Silano	with Avildsen and Charlie Clifton
1974	There Is No 13	William Sachs	
1976	Rocky	John G. Avildsen	2nd unit photography
1977	Secrets of the Gods	William Sachs	Documentary
1977	Saturday Night Fever	John Badham	
1978	Somebody Killed Her Husband	Lamont Johnson	with Andrew Laszlo
1978	Slow Dancing in the Big City	John G. Avildsen	
1979	Rich Kids	Robert M. Young	
1980	Coal Miner's Daughter	Michael Apted	
1980	Dressed to Kill	Brian De Palma	
1981	Raggedy Man	Jack Fisk	
1982	A Little Sex	Bruce Paltrow	
1983	Gorky Park	Michael Apted	
1984	Firstborn	Michael Apted	
1985	Bring On the Night	Michael Apted	Documentary
1986	Violets Are Blue	Jack Fisk	
1986	The Whoopee Boys	John Byrum	
1987	Critical Condition	Michael Apted	
1987	The Big Town	Ben Bolt	
1988	Distant Thunder	Rick Rosenthal	
1988	The Accused	Jonathan Kaplan	
1989	Cousins	Joel Schumacher	
1989	Uncle Buck	John Hughes	
1991	One Good Cop	Heywood Gould	
1992	Leaving Normal	Edward Zwick	
1992	Love Field	Jonathan Kaplan	
1993	Made in America	Richard Benjamin	
1993	The Nutcracker	Emile Ardolino	
1994	Bad Girls	Jonathan Kaplan	
1994	Don Juan DeMarco	Jeremy Leven	
1994	Safe Passage	Robert Allan Ackerman	
1995	The Big Green	Holly Goldberg Sloan	
1996	I'm Not Rappaport	Herb Gardner	Additional photography
1997	A Simple Wish	Michael Ritchie	
1997	Hacks	Gary Rosen	
1998	The Proposition	Lesli Linka Glatter	Additional photography
1999	The Secret Life of Girls	Holly Goldberg Sloan	
2000	Boys and Girls	Robert Iscove	
2001	Speaking of Sex	John McNaughton	Posthumous release

=== Television ===
Year	Title	Note
1993	Gypsy	TV film
1995	A Streetcar Named Desire	TV film
1995	The History of Rock 'n' Roll	Documentary; 4 episodes
1997	Cinderella	TV film
1999	The Hunt for the Unicorn Killer	TV film
1999	Annie	TV film
1999	Sarah, Plain and Tall: Winter's End	TV film

== Awards and nominations ==
	Year	Category	Work	Result
Academy Awards	1981	Best Cinematography	Coal Miner's Daughter	Nominated
Primetime Emmy Awards	1994	Outstanding Cinematography for a Limited or Anthology Series or Movie	Gypsy	Nominated
Primetime Emmy Awards	2004	Outstanding Cinematography for a Limited or Anthology Series or Movie	Annie	Nominated
