= Marilyn Jacobs Tenser =

American film producer (1931–2020)

- Born: Marilyn Jacobs; May 6, 1931; Los Angeles, California, U.S.
- Died: December 2020 (aged 89); California, U.S.
- Occupation: Film producer
- Spouse(s): Mark Tenser (1953–2018; his death)
- Parent: Newton P. Jacobs

Marilyn Jacobs Tenser (6 May 1931 – December 2020) was an American film producer known for her work on independent films from the 1970s through the early 2000s.

== Life and career ==
Jacobs Tenser was the daughter of Newton P. Jacobs, the founder of Crown International Pictures, and she continued to work for the company as of 2018. She was married to Mark Tenser until his death in 2018.

She died after a short illness in California in December 2020, at the age of 89.

== Selected filmography ==
- Malibu Spring Break (2003)
- Lena's Holiday (1991)
- My Mom's a Werewolf (1989)
- Hunk (1987)
- My Chauffeur (1986)
- Tomboy (1985)
- Weekend Pass (1984)
- My Tutor (1983)
- The Beach Girls (1982)
- Galaxina (1980)
- Van Nuys Blvd. (1979)
- Malibu Beach (1978)
- The Van (1977)
- The Pom Pom Girls (1976)
- Policewomen (1974)
- Superchick (1973)
- Point of Terror (1971)
