= Judgement (1992 film) =

- Directed by: William Sachs
- Written by: William Sachs
- Produced by: Marilyn Jacobs Tenser; Newton P. Jacobs; Michael D. Castle
- Starring: Elliott Gould; Emilia Crow; Karen Black; Cuba Gooding Jr.
- Cinematography: Kelly Johnson; Shelly Johnson
- Music by: Garry Schyman
- Release date: 1992
- Running time: 85 minutes
- Country: United States
- Language: English

Judgement (also known under the title Hitz) is a 1992 American drama film written and directed by William Sachs. Beside many known actors (including Cuba Gooding Jr. in his first feature film role), it also features appearances by actual gang members from Los Angeles. Due to its realism, Father Greg Boyle has used the film to show at-risk youths the dangers of gang life.

== Production ==
To research the film, William Sachs spent three months riding with the LAPD gang unit at night, and going to the juvenile court during the day. He originally intended the film to be a surrealistic satire on the justice system, but due to interference by the producers, the final film is partially a satire, partially a straight drama. Originally, for example, Sachs intended the film to start with a scene of the judge using a taser on himself, but the producers re-edited it for a more serious tone. Sachs himself therefore calls the final film "patchy and uneven". The film was shot in 1988, but, due to legal issues, released four years later, in 1992. Sachs cast actual gang members to appear in the film, some as thugs, some in other roles. He was impressed by their professional attitude on set, keeping gang rivalries out of the working environment.

== Cast ==
The cast includes:

- Elliott Gould as Judge Callow
- Emilia Crow as Judge Chelsea Walker
- Karen Black as Tiffany Powers
- Ed Lauter as Dallas Hale
- Sydney Lassick as Dr. Henry Silver
- Francesco Quinn as Jimmy Sollera
- Cuba Gooding Jr. as Officer Alvarez
