= A New Kind of Family =

Television series

- Genre: Sitcom
- Written by: Bob Illes; James R. Stein
- Directed by: James Burrows; Bob Claver; Herbert Kenwith; Jeremiah Morris; Alan Myerson
- Starring: Eileen Brennan; Rob Lowe; Telma Hopkins
- Composers: Dan Foliart; Howard Pearl
- Country of origin: United States
- Original language: English
- No. of seasons: 1
- No. of episodes: 10

Production
- Producers: Nick Arnold; Bob Illes
- Camera setup: Multi-camera
- Running time: 30 minutes
- Production company: Gordon-Eisner Productions

Original release
- Network: ABC
- Release: September 16, 1979 – January 5, 1980

A New Kind of Family is an American sitcom that aired on ABC from September 1979 to January 1980. The series stars Eileen Brennan, Rob Lowe and Telma Hopkins. It is not related to the ABC series Family.

== Synopsis ==
Eileen Brennan stars as Kit Flanagan, a widowed mother of three who shares a home with a divorced woman, Abby Stone (Gwynne Gilford), and her daughter Jill in an effort to save money.

Halfway during the series' first season, it was pulled from the schedule and re-tooled in an effort to boost ratings. The characters of Abby and Jill Stone were written out and new characters, Jess and Jojo Ashton (played by Telma Hopkins and Janet Jackson respectively), were added to the series. Despite the cast change, the show was cancelled in January 1980.

== Cast ==
- Eileen Brennan as Kit Flanagan
- Rob Lowe as Tony Flanagan
- Lauri Hendler as Hillary Flanagan
- David Hollander as Andy Flanagan
- Gwynne Gilford as Abby Stone (September–October 1979)
- Connie Ann Hearn as Jill Stone (September–October 1979)
- Telma Hopkins as Jess Ashton (December 1979 – January 1980)
- Janet Jackson as Jojo Ashton (December 1979)
- Chuck McCann as Harold Zimmerman

== Episodes ==
No.	Title	Directed by	Written by	Original release date
1	"I Do"	Unknown	Unknown	September 16, 1979
2	"Are You Sure Barnum and Bailey Started Like This?"	Unknown	Unknown	September 23, 1979
3	"The Hero"	Unknown	Unknown	September 30, 1979
4	"The Break-Up"	Unknown	Unknown	October 7, 1979
5	"Invasion of Privacy"	Unknown	Unknown	October 14, 1979
6	"Andy's New Dad"	Unknown	Unknown	October 21, 1979
7	"Thank You for a Lovely Evening"	Unknown	Unknown	December 15, 1979
8	"Is There a Gun in the House?"	Unknown	Unknown	December 22, 1979
9	"Fair Weather Friend"	Unknown	Unknown	December 29, 1979
10	"No Smoking, Please"	Unknown	Unknown	January 5, 1980

== Award nominations ==
Year	Award	Result	Category	Recipient
1980	Emmy Award	Outstanding Video Tape Editing for a Series	Nominated	Marco Zappia (editor) (For "I Do")
