= Terror Among Us =

- Genre: Action; Crime; Thriller
- Written by: Dallas Barnes; JoAnne Barnes
- Directed by: Paul Krasny
- Starring: Don Meredith; Sarah Purcell; Jennifer Salt
- Music by: Allyn Ferguson
- Country of origin: United States
- Original language: English

Production
- Executive producer: David Gerber
- Producer: James H. Brown
- Cinematography: Robert B. Hauser
- Editor: Richard Freeman
- Running time: 96 minutes
- Production companies: David Gerber Productions; Columbia Pictures Television

Original release
- Network: CBS
- Release: January 14, 1981

Terror Among Us is a 1981 made-for-television action crime film directed by Paul Krasny and starring Don Meredith, Sarah Purcell, and Jennifer Salt. It first aired January 14, 1981. The script was co-written by Dallas and JoAnne Barnes.

The film originally aired as a CBS 9:30pm "Wednesday Night Movie". It was released on DVD on August 16, 2010.

== Plot ==
A police sergeant and a parole officer endeavor to stop a rapist-on-parole before he can follow through his threats on five women who testified against him years earlier.

== Cast ==
- Don Meredith as Sergeant Tom Stockwell
- Sarah Purcell as Jennifer
- Jennifer Salt as Connie Paxton
- Kim Lankford as Vickie Stevens
- Sharon Spelman as Sara Kates
- Rod McCary as Gates
- Elta Blake as Beth
- Pat Klous as Cathy
- Jim Antonio as Doctor
- Virginia Paris as Mrs. Quinn
- Tracy Reed as Barbara
- Ted Shackelford as Delbert Ramsey
- Stephen Keep as Roger Shiel

== Reception ==
Sarah Purcell, who appears in the film, hoped Terror Among Us would help in teaching women how to protect themselves from attack, describing of her character: "I'm the one who does something, at the risk of my own life. I'm about a goner anyway and I really would be a goner if I just sat there and didn't do anything." In a scathing review for Fort Lauderdale News, Bill Kelley accused the film of "trivializing the volatile subject it covers" in favor of a B-movie approach, writing how the character Ted finds "not one, not two, but five comely flight attendants" in the apartment complex, "and, if not for Meredith and the CBS Standards and Practices censorship code, he'd make out like a fox in a henhouse." Kelley also dismissed Purcell's charge that the film was a relevant piece rather than exploitative. Similarly, Allen J. Hubbin of The Armchair Detective felt the film only purported to examine a relevant issue, writing: "Terror Among Us was supposedly about the evils of a 'revolving-door' probation system. Instead, it was about a rapist who terrorizes a roomful of bound and gagged stewardesses for half an hour." The climax of the film is popular with fans of damsel in distress scenarios, being found on websites that list female bondage scenes in mainstream media. In 1990, readers of Bondage Life voted it the best bondage scene in television history; the magazine said that "network TV has a long way to go to top this one." In 2001, Carl McGuire of Bondage Life, in his Bound for Hollywood column, named it the best group bondage scene in film and television history.
