= Record City =

1977 film

- Directed by: Dennis Steinmetz
- Written by: Ron Friedman
- Produced by: James T. Aubrey; Joe Byrne
- Starring: Ed Begley Jr. Sorrell Booke; Michael Callan; Jack Carter; Frank Gorshin; Ruth Buzzi; Dennis Bowen
- Cinematography: William M. Klages
- Edited by: Bill Breshears
- Music by: Freddie Perren
- Production company: The Aubrey Company
- Distributed by: American International Pictures
- Release date: November 1977
- Running time: 93 minutes
- Country: United States
- Language: English

Record City is a 1977 American comedy film starring Ed Begley Jr., Sorrell Booke, Michael Callan, Jack Carter, Frank Gorshin, Ruth Buzzi, Dennis Bowen, Larry Storch, and Alice Ghostley. It was made on location at Eagle Rock, California.

== Plot ==
The youth-oriented film chronicles the zany exploits of the employees at a record store, with Michael Callan as the girl-chasing manager and a host of popular TV comedians in supporting roles.

== Production ==
Record City was spearheaded by former CBS-TV executive James T. Aubrey, who produced this picture with what was then a visionary approach: it was recorded on much less expensive videotape instead of professional 35mm film. The edited tape was transferred to 35mm film for theaters and to 16mm film for television syndication and college showings. "Out of this may come a revolution," predicted Aubrey. "This picture would have cost one and a half [million] or twice as much if made on film by an independent company." Aubrey admitted that the production cost was "comfortably under $1 million" but would not disclose the actual figure. "The advantage of tape has always appealed to me. Now it is practical, since the tape-to-film transfer can be accomplished with no loss of quality to the normal viewer." This last statement wasn't strictly true, because film prints of Record City betrayed their videotape origins and resembled kinescopes of the 1960s—films photographed off of a television monitor.

But speed was producer Aubrey's main concern—he avoided a three-month period of film-laboratory post-production and prepared the videotape master and the film negative in a few weeks' time, so he could open the film in theaters as a lightweight summertime comedy.

Unfortunately for Aubrey, his distributor, American International, held back the release until the fall of 1977. Boxoffice magazine reported that "first showings" in Chicago were held on November 4, 1977.

== Reception ==
The Boxoffice reviewer liked the film's chances: "Screenplay is filled with risqué humor and dialogue loaded with double entendres. Director Dennis Steinmetz moves the story along at a spirited pace... The film belongs to the Car Wash genre and will appeal to those fans. The film provides enough bizarre situations to produce a few laughs and should do well in saturation bookings."

== Cast ==
(in alphabetical order)

- Jeff Altman as Engineer
- Leonard Barr as Sickly Man
- Ed Begley Jr. as Pokey
- Sorrell Booke as Coznowski
- Dennis Bowen as Danny
- Ruth Buzzi as Olga
- Michael Callan as Eddie
- Jack Carter as Manny
- Rick Dees as Gordon
- Kinky Friedman as himself
- Tony Giorgio as Mr. F
- Stuart Goetz as Rupert
- Alice Ghostley as Worried Wife
- Frank Gorshin as Chameleon
- Maria Grimm as Rita
- John Halsey as Priest In The Fetus Brother
- Joe Higgins as Doyle
- Ted Lange as The Wiz
- Alan Oppenheimer as Blind Man
- Isaac Ruiz as Macho
- Harold Sakata as Gucci
- Wendy Schaal as Lorraine
- Larry Storch as Deaf Man
- Elliott Street as Hitch
- Tim Thomerson as Marty
- Susan Tolsky as Goldie
