= James Daughton =

American actor (born 1950)

- Born: June 27, 1950 (age 75); Chula Vista, California, U.S.
- Occupation: Actor

James Daughton (born June 27, 1950) is an American film and television actor who is best known for his role as Greg Marmalard in National Lampoon's Animal House (1978). Daughton's portrayal of Marmalard has become iconic in American popular culture as the quintessential old money, preppy, WASP snob.

Raised in San Diego, California, Daughton had roles early in his career on Marcus Welby, MD, Room 222, Chopper One (as Phil Collins in the episode "Strain of Innocence"), Planet of the Apes (as Mikal in the episode "The Tyrant"), Happy Days (as the man who challenges Fonzie to water ski over the shark), and 1972 western The Revengers (as William Holden's son). He appeared in the television series Barnaby Jones, playing a character named Willie Grand in the March 1973 episode "The Murdering Class".

He also appeared in the 1982 film The Beach Girls, in which he was noted primarily for stripping naked and running into the sea. His other film appearances include Malibu Beach (1978), Swim Team (1979), Blind Date (1984), Spies Like Us (1985), Girlfriend from Hell (1989) and Sorority Boys (2002).

== Filmography ==
Year	Title	Role	Notes
1972	The Revengers	Morgan	
1978	Malibu Beach	Bobby	
1978	Animal House	Greg Marmalard	
1979	Swim Team	Danny	
1982	The Beach Girls	Scott Daniels	
1984	Blind Date	Dave	
1985	Spies Like Us	Bob Hodges	
1987	House of the Rising Sun	Frankie	
1988	Mortuary Academy	Yuppie At Car Lot	
1989	Girlfriend from Hell	Randolph Osbourne III	
1995	Hologram Man	Captain / Chairman	
2002	Sorority Boys	Dave's Dad	(final film role)
