= George Bowers (filmmaker) =

American film director and editor

- Born: April 20, 1944; Bronx, New York, U.S.
- Died: August 18, 2012 (aged 68); Los Angeles, California, U.S.
- Occupations: Film director, editor, producer
- Years active: 1968–2012
- Spouse: Irene Brun (1969–2012)

George Bowers (April 20, 1944 – August 18, 2012) was an American film director, editor, and producer. He had nearly thirty credits as a feature-film editor in a career spanning nearly forty years.

Bowers was born in the Bronx, New York. After graduating from high school, he began his editing career under the tutelage of Hugh Robertson, who is noted as one of the first African-Americans to gain membership in the Motion Picture Editors Guild. He started working as an assistant editor at ABC directly out of high school, and after military service he worked for Robertson's company Byro Productions. His first feature-film credit as editor was for the television movie ...And Beautiful II (1970).

As an editor, Bowers's feature-film credits span the years from 1970 to his last film in 2008. He worked extensively with directors Joseph Ruben and Penny Marshall, including A League of Their Own (Marshall–1992) and The Stepfather (Ruben–1987). Bowers mentored younger editors including Sam Pollard, who has edited several of director Spike Lee's films.

As a director, Bowers films include Private Resort (1985) with Johnny Depp and Rob Morrow, and My Tutor (1983) with Crispin Glover.

Bowers died from complications related to heart surgery on August 18, 2012, at Cedars-Sinai Medical Center in Los Angeles, California; he was 68 years old. Bowers had been selected as a member of the Academy of Motion Picture Arts & Sciences and of the American Cinema Editors.

== Filmography (as editor) ==
Filmography based on the listing at the Internet Movie Database.

- Welcome Home Roscoe Jenkins (with Paul Millspaugh—2008)
- Roll Bounce (with Paul Millspaugh-2005)
- Walking Tall (2004)
- The Country Bears (with Seth Flaum and Dean Holland-2002)
- From Hell (with Dan Lebental-2001)
- Deuce Bigalow: Male Gigolo (with Lawrence Jordan and Doron Shauly-1999)
- How Stella Got Her Groove Back (1998)
- The Preacher's Wife (with Stephen A. Rotter-1996)
- Money Train (with Bill Pankow-1995)
- Renaissance Man (1994)
- The Good Son (1993)
- A League of Their Own (1992)
- Sleeping with the Enemy (1991)
- Harlem Nights (1989)
- True Believer (1989)
- Shoot to Kill (1988)
- She's Having a Baby (additional editor-1988)
- The Stepfather (1987)
- The Adventures of Buckaroo Banzai Across the 8th Dimension (1984)
- The Beach Girls (1982)
- Galaxina (1980)
- Van Nuys Blvd. (1979)
- Cool Red (1976)
- The Pom Pom Girls (1976)
- The Sister-in-Law (1974)
- Save the Children (1973)
- Come Back Charleston Blue (with Gerald B. Greenberg-1972)
- A Fable (1971)
- ...And Beautiful II (1970)

== Filmography as director ==
- Private Resort (1985)
- My Tutor (1983)
- Body and Soul (1981)
- The Hearse (1980)
- Dukes of Hazzard (1979) – unknown episodes
- Vegetable Soup (1976) – unknown episodes
