= Nicole Dreiske =

American author

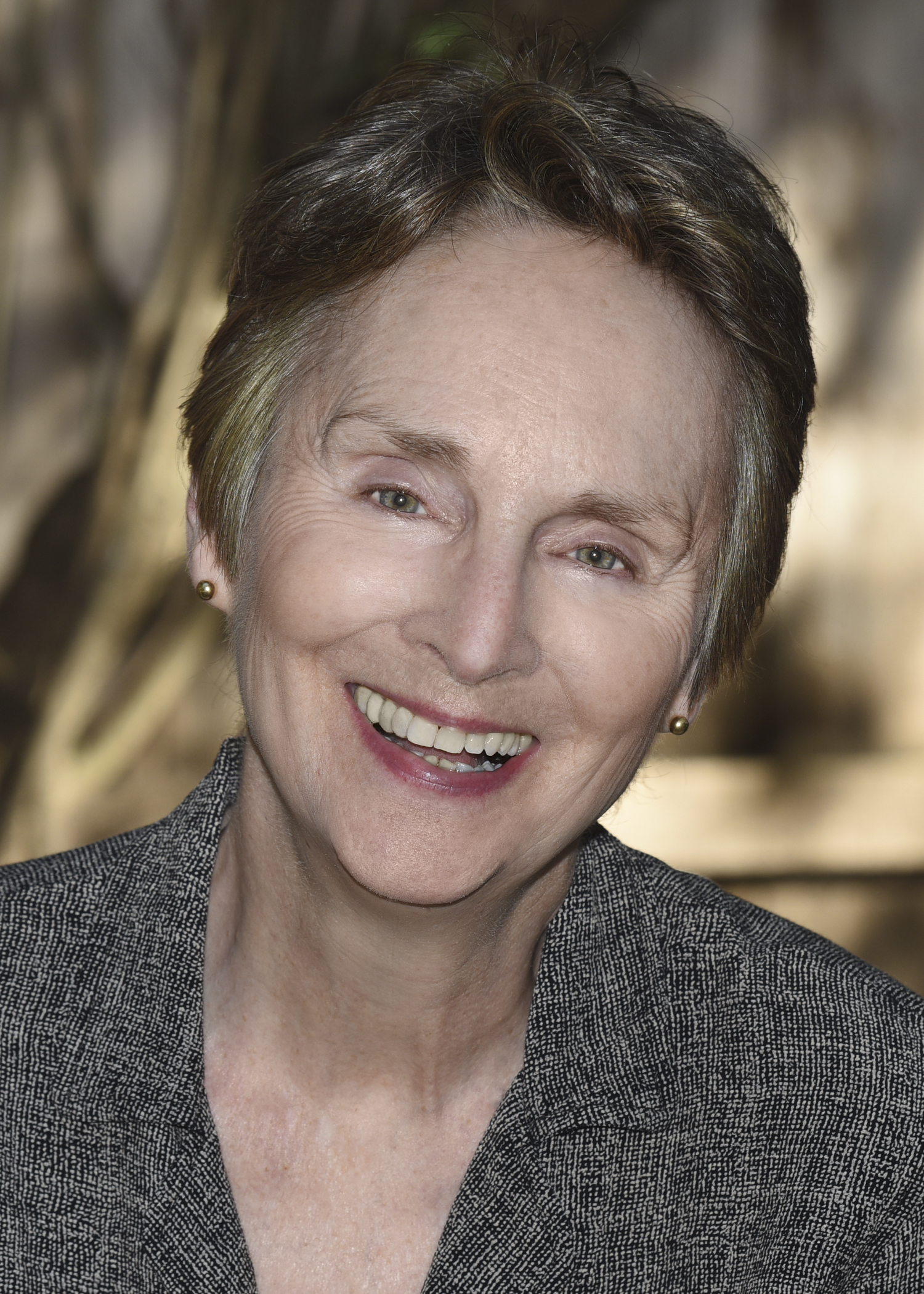
- Nicole Dreiske, October 2017
- Born: Nicole Elena Dreiske; August 14, 1952 (age 74); New York, United States
- Education: Oberlin College
- Occupation: Writer

Nicole Elena Dreiske (born August 14, 1952) is an American author, playwright, theater director, and media educator. Founder of the Chicago International Children's Film Festival, Facets Multi-Media, and the International Children's Media Center, she is considered an expert on how parents can help their children engage screens and media in healthy ways.

== Biography ==
Nicole was born in New York City, NY but her family relocated to Winnetka, Illinois in 1962. She attended New Trier East High School, working extensively in their theater program, and continued to immerse herself in the arts at Oberlin College. In 1975, she launched Facets Multi-Media with Milos Stehlik, and in 1983, she founded the Chicago International Children's Film Festival. In 2010, she founded the International Children's Media Center, which is a non-profit organization dedicated to transforming education by changing how children view and engage with technology. Nicole is best known for her non-fiction book, “The Upside of Digital Devices: How to Make Your Child More Screen Smart, Literate, and Emotionally Intelligent” which received the National Parenting Center's Seal of Approval in 2018.

== Personal life ==
Dreiske is a member of Phi Beta Kappa and lives in Chicago.
