= The Pom Pom Girls =

1976 American film by Joseph Ruben

- Movie Poster
- Directed by: Joseph Ruben
- Screenplay by: Joseph Ruben
- Story by: Joseph Ruben; Robert J. Rosenthal
- Produced by: Joseph Ruben; Marilyn Jacobs Tenser
- Starring: Robert Carradine; Jennifer Ashley
- Cinematography: Stephen M. Katz
- Edited by: George Bowers
- Music by: Michael Lloyd
- Distributed by: Crown International Pictures
- Release date: May 1976 (United States)
- Running time: 89 minutes
- Country: United States
- Language: English
- Box office: $26 million or $7.4 million

The Pom Pom Girls (also known as Palisades High) is a 1976 American film directed by Joseph Ruben. The screenplay was written by Ruben and based on a story by him and Robert J. Rosenthal. The movie was shot on location at Chaminade High School in Los Angeles. The Pom Pom Girls is a low budget sex comedy, which was often popular at drive-in theaters during the 1970s. The film features an early performance by Robert Carradine, who would later play Lewis Skolnik in the 1984 hit movie, Revenge of the Nerds. The film also features Susan Player Jarreau (as the car hop waitress), wife of Grammy-winning singer Al Jarreau.

== Plot ==
The Rosedale High School “pom pom girls,” Sue Ann, Sally, Roxanne, Laurie and Judy, are courted by the school's star football teammates Johnnie Chrystal and Jesse Davis, and Duane, a longtime rival of Johnnie's. Jesse and Roxanne make a connection, but Laurie, her closest friend, dislikes him, while Johnnie and Duane compete for Sally's attention.

The players and cheerleaders engage in prank escalation with their main rivals, Hardin High. The constant retaliations culminate in commandeering an antique fire engine from the Hardin Fire Department, driving it onto the field during football practice, and spraying the entire team and cheerleading squad with the fire hose. Coach Hartman and Principal Myers gather a large group of students, hoping to find the responsible parties, but the perpetrators are shielded by the group, all of whom admit guilt.

Jesse and Laurie ultimately do find chemistry, but also has a tryst with Sue Ann, which he regrets soon after. The tension between Duane and Johnnie grows violent at a home game. Jesse's erratic behavior with women leads his coach to caution him about his choices, and ultimately cut him from the team. After initially contemplating leaving town, after spending a night with Laurie, he decides to return to school, where he takes responsibility and quits the football team.

Meanwhile, Duane challenges Johnnie to a game of “Suicide Chicken,” wherein the two contestants drive each other's cars toward a cliff, and the winner is the one who stops last before going over. Johnnie accepts the challenge. The contestants exchange cars, and when Sally gives the signal, both drive toward the cliff. Duane stops short but Johnnie continues over the cliff, where Duane's car crashes and burns. As his friends initially believe him dead, Johnnie emerges alive, having jumped from the car before it reached the cliff.

== Production ==
The modest profits of the exploitation/teensploitation film The Cheerleaders (1975) inspired The Pom Pom Girls writers with cheerleader themes and scenes. Easy Rider had an influence on the film, the huge success of that film had filmmakers like the scriptwriters Robert Rosenthal and Joseph Ruben, who is the director, include the theme of the value of freedom. Many shots and automobiles were included, drive-in restaurant, "suicide chicken" race, many scenes of nostalgia that was incorporated from the present day. Even a tagline was borrowed from a "50s picture", the exploitation film Rebel Without a Cause (1955). The tagline "How can anyone ever forget the girls who really turned us on?", is a promotional line and used in the film's cover art, and is to express nostalgia.

Another teen sex comedy, 1978's Malibu Beach, borrowed some set design and music from The Pom Pom Girls, as Malibu Beach was directed by The Pom Pom Girls writer, Robert J Rosenthal.

== Cast ==
- Robert Carradine as Johnnie
- Jennifer Ashley as Laurie
- Michael Mullins as Jesse
- Lisa Reeves as Sally
- Bill Adler as Duane
- James Gammon as Coach
- Susan Player as Su Ann
- Cheryl Smith (Credited as Rainbeaux Smith) as Roxanne
- Diane Lee Hart as Judy
- Sondra Lowell as Miss Pritchett

== Reception ==
The film earned $4.3 million in rentals during its initial release.

=== Home Video ===
This film has been issued on Too Cool For School: 12 Movie Collection from Mill Creek Entertainment September 29, 2009 and on The Starlite Drive-In Theater: (The Pom Pom Girls / The Van) from BCI / Eclipse September 26, 2006. It received a Blu-ray edition from Scorpion Releasing in 2013.
