= Stuart Goetz =

American-born actor and music editor

Stuart Goetz is a Daytime Emmy Award winning film music editor best known for his music editing roles on The West Wing, The Vampire Diaries and Pretty Little Liars, among others.

Prior to his music editing career, Goetz was a stage actor, appearing on Broadway in the musicals Mame, Oliver!, and Ben Franklin in Paris throughout the mid to late-1960s. Making the transition to television in the early-1970s, Goetz is perhaps most known for his role as "Charlie" in the 1973 The Brady Bunch episode, "The Subject Was Noses" (the infamous "oh, my nose!" episode, in which Marcia is struck on the nose with a football). In 1976, Goetz recorded a single for Curb Records, "(I'm a Song) Sing Me," which was co-written by Neil Sedaka.

His best-known film role was in the drive-in movie, The Van, starring alongside Danny DeVito. Goetz played the lead role of Bobby, a teenager who buys a customized 1976 Dodge van with his college savings so he can use it to pick up women.

== Filmography (As Music Editor) ==
Year	Production	Role	Episodes
2019 - present	Roswell, New Mexico (TV series)	Music Editor	
2018 - present	Legacies (TV series)	Music Editor	
2018	God Friended Me	Music Editor	1
2018	American Woman (TV series)	Music Editor	3
2013 - 2018	The Originals (TV series)	Music Editor	35
2009 - 2017	The Vampire Diaries	Music Editor	27
2016	Containment (TV series)	Music Editor	2
2010 - 2015	Pretty Little Liars	Music Editor	34
2013 - 2014	The Following	Music Editor	28
2013 - 2014	Ravenswood (TV series)	Music Editor	10
2013	Browsers (TV movie)	Music Editor	
2011 - 2012	The Secret Circle (TV series)	Music Editor	10
2004 - 2012	One Tree Hill (TV series)	Music Editor	64
2011	That's What I Am	Music Editor	
2009	The Middle (TV series)	Music Editor	7
2009	Saving Grace B. Jones (Film)	Music Editor	
2008	Privileged (TV series)	Music Editor	1
2007 - 2008	Notes From the Underbelly	Music Editor	16
2007 - 2008	Moonlight (TV series)	Music Editor	10
2007	Traveler (TV series)	Music Editor	7
2007	Side Order of Life	Music Editor	5
2006	What About Brian	Music Editor	1
2003 - 2006	Everwood (TV series)	Music Editor	39
2004	Jack & Bobby	Music Editor	1
2004	The Days (TV series)	Music Editor	1
2003	Wuthering Heights (2003 film)	Music Editor	
2002 - 2003	The Twilight Zone (2002 TV series)	Music Editor	36
2002	Hidden Hills	Music Editor	1
1999 - 2002	The West Wing	Music Editor	66
2001	The Oblongs	Music Editor	9
2001	First Years	Music Editor	1
2000 - 2001	Two Guys and a Girl	Music Editor	3
2000 - 2001	Once and Again	Music Editor	6
1999	Walking Across Egypt (Film)	Music Editor	
1999	It's Like, You Know...	Music Editor	1
1998 - 1999	Jesse (TV series)	Music Editor	14
1997 - 1998	Family Matters	Music Editor	21
1997	Prefontaine (film)	Music Editor	
1997	Mimic (film)	Music Editor	36
1997	Ink (TV series)	Music Editor	
1996	The Legend of Sarmoti: Siegfried & Roy (TV series short)	Music Editor	4
1996	Sonic: Christmas Blast (TV short)	Music Editor	
1996	Spy Hard	Assistant Music Editor	
1995	Kirk (TV series)	Music Editor	3
1995	Jingle Bell Rock (TV short)	Music Editor	6
1995	Evolver (film)	Music Editor	
1993 - 1994	Double Dragon (TV series)	Music Editor	24
1994	Sonic the Hedgehog (TV series)	Music Editor	10
1994	Men of War (film)	Music Editor	
1993	All-New Dennis the Menace	Music Editor	13
1993	Adventures of Sonic the Hedgehog	Music Editor	13
1993	Hurricanes (TV series)	Music Editor	
1992	Ghost Ship	Music Editor	
1992	Thumbelina	Music Editor	
1992	Aladdin	Music Editor	
1992	Pinocchio	Music Editor	
1991 - 1992	Hammerman	Supervising Music Editor	11
1990 - 1992	Captain Planet and the Planeteers	Supervising Music Editor	52
1990 - 1992	G.I. Joe: A Real American Hero	Supervising Music Editor	39
1990 - 1991	Where's Waldo	Supervising Music Editor	13
1988 - 1991	The Real Ghostbusters	Supervising Music Editor	48
1991	Swamp Thing	Supervising Music Editor	5
1990	New Kids on the Block (TV series)	Supervising Music Editor	15
1990	Captain N: The Game Master	Supervising Music Editor	13
1990	The Adventures of Super Mario Bros. 3	Supervising Music Editor	26
1990	The Wizard of Oz (TV series)	Supervising Music Editor	13
1990	Camp Candy	Supervising Music Editor	6
1989	Ring Raiders	Music Editor	
1989	G.I Joe: Operation Dragonfire	Music Editor	5
1989	Hellgate (1989 film)	Music Editor	
1988 - 1989	COPS (animated TV series)	Music Supervisor	11
1988 - 1989	ALF (TV series)	Supervising Music Editor	13
1988	Madeline (short)	Supervising Music Editor	
1988	Beanie and Cecil	Supervising Music Editor	5
1988	The Stick	Music Editor	
1988	ALF Tales	Supervising Music Editor	
1987	The Stick	Music Editor	
1987	Meet Julie	Music Editor	
1987	Starcom: The U.S. Space Force	Music Editor	13
1987	Hello Kitty's Furry Tale Theater	Music Editor	
1987	Sylvanian Families (1987 TV series)	Assistant Music Editor	13
1983	Doctor Detroit	Assistant Music Editor	

== Selected Filmography (As Actor) ==
- The Van (1977)
- Record City (1978)

== Appearances on TV shows ==
- "Who's Afraid of Mother Goose?" on Off to See the Wizard
- The Brady Bunch
- The Paul Lynde Show
- The Partridge Family
- Flipper
- It's a Bird…It's a Plane…It's Superman (musical)
- Ring Raiders
