= William Sachs =

American film director

- Born: William Sachs; October 16, 1942; Montvale, New Jersey
- Died: April 7, 2024 (aged 81)
- Education: London Film School
- Occupations: Film director, film producer, film editor, writer
- Years active: 1970–2024

William Sachs was an American film director/producer and writer. Besides his work as a writer and director, since working on Joe, Sachs has been particularly noted for successfully doctoring others' films prior to release in order to conform them to the producers' wishes for broader commercial appeal. His films have screened and received more than 25 awards at various festivals.

== Life and career ==
Originally, Sachs studied business and accounting, but disliked it. After enlisting in the U.S. Air Force and serving in England during the Vietnam War, he went to college again, majoring in sociology. After talking a film course, he found his passion and decided to study film at London Film School where he directed three short films that won awards during his studies. In addition, he studied acting with Michael Gough in London, and with various teachers in the US. Following his studies, he started working in the US, first re-working films deemed problematic by producers, including Joe, for which Sachs declined a co-director credit and picked a credit as "Post Production Supervisor" because he felt it reflected his involvement in post production best.

Working in Italy in the early 1970s, he started planning his first feature-film as a writer and director: There Is No 13. This film, which is the first film in which Ralf D. Bode is credited as cinematographer, was screened at Berlin Film Festival 1974, where it received a lot of praise and attention. There, it polarized the audiences due to it being American, dealing with the Vietnam war. During the screening, there were protests, with some people shouting and someone turning the light in the auditorium on and off a few times. A judge told Sachs that the film should have won a golden bear as "it was the only unusual film" at the festival, and that it didn't only because the jury was worried about the public reaction to the winning film being so controversial.. The film has been called "probably Sachs' best film, certainly his most profound."

In the following decades, in addition to directing films that became cult classics (like The Incredible Melting Man, Galaxina, Van Nuys Blvd.), Sachs also reworked/doctored numerous films by other directors in post-production prior to release.

His most recent feature-film work as a writer/director, Spooky House (2002), starring Ben Kingsley, received numerous awards. Currently, Sachs has multiple films in development, including one about the assassination of Martin Luther King Jr.

Beside his work in feature-films, Sachs has also directed numerous commercials, music videos, public service announcements and a special effects video used by Pink Floyd during concerts. He has also been a guest lecturer at UCLA School of Theater, Film and Television, Cal State Northridge and the California Institute of the Arts.

== Death ==
Sachs died of pancreatic cancer on April 7, 2024, in California. He was 81.

== Film style ==
William Sachs himself mentions that his style is primarily influenced by surrealists like Federico Fellini, Luis Buñuel and others. In many of his films, there are surrealistic elements. There is No 13, written, directed and co-produced by Sachs, is a highly surrealistic comedy that showcases his style very well: The mood, music and style switches from scene to scene, and realistic elements are interwoven with absurdist, surrealistic ones.

In Sachs' later films that he again often wrote in addition to directing them, producers sometimes interfered with his style, although it still shines through in many points. The Incredible Melting Man, for example, was meant as a surrealistic comedy by Sachs, but many intentionally absurdist elements were removed by the producers from the final film to give it a more "serious" tone. Still, scenes like the ending (in which a janitor shovels the molten remains of the titular character into a bucket) give a hint of the surrealist tone that Sachs wanted for the film.

In Van Nuys Blvd., a number of comedic scenes of a police officer on a beach, being handcuffed to his car, show a gradually more and more surrealist tone as the film progresses. In the course of the film, he gets approached by a mysterious biker stealing his possessions, a dog and ultimately, towards the end of the film, his own mother who is worried about her boy while police searches for his location.

== Filmography ==
=== As director ===
- Dear Mrs. Smith (1968, short)
- This is Ford (1968, short)
- Breakfast (1968)
- There Is No 13 (1974)
- Secrets of the Gods (also known as The Force Beyond) (1976, documentary)
- The Incredible Melting Man (1977)
- Van Nuys Blvd. (1979)
- Galaxina (1980)
- Exterminator 2 (1984) (additional scenes directed by)
- Hot Chili (1985)
- The Last Hour (1991)
- Judgement (also known as Hitz) (1992)
- Spooky House (2002)

=== As "film doctor" (excerpt) ===
Beside Sachs' work as a director, he has "doctored" many American and foreign language films prior to their release. This includes re-editing, re-shooting and adding/changing elements in post-production, often changing tone and focus of the film considerably. He is sometimes uncredited, and often credited in various different ways for his work. In the process, he has so far "doctored" more than 20 films. A few notable examples:

- Joe (1970)
- South of Hell Mountain (1971, credited as co-director)
- Exterminator 2 (1984)
- Leprechaun (1993)

== Quotes ==
The film's director (...) initially pushed its title character (...) into the background, while Sachs, through post-production trickery, made the role of Joe pivotal.

— Sam Weisberg, about Joe

I was doing post production on my first film in Rome. There were three cutting rooms in a row. I was in the middle one. Antonioni was on one side and Fellini on the other. I thought if I could touch both walls at the same time I would be injected with genius. Too bad my arms were too short...

— William Sachs, about editing his film There is No 13
