= Van Nuys Blvd. (film) =

- Film poster
- Directed by: William Sachs
- Written by: William Sachs
- Produced by: Marilyn Jacobs Tenser; Newton P. Jacobs; Michael D. Castle
- Starring: Bill Adler; Cynthia Wood; Dennis Bowen; Melissa Prophet
- Cinematography: Joseph Mangine
- Edited by: George Bowers
- Music by: Ken Mansfield; Ron Wright
- Release date: 1979
- Running time: 93 minutes
- Country: United States
- Language: English
- Box office: $1,750,000

Van Nuys Blvd. is a 1979 comedy film written and directed by William Sachs and released by Crown International Pictures. It features 1974 Playboy Playmate of the Year Cynthia Wood. The film's tag line is: "The Greatest Cruisin' in the Land Takes Place on the Street -- Where it all Began ..."

== Plot ==
The film tells the story of a small-town boy, Bobby, who hears about the excitement of cruising Van Nuys Boulevard in California. He investigates and gets involved with drag racers, topless dancers and bikers.

After Greg and Camille's boyfriens vandalize each other's cars, Greg leaves with a female bikers. Chooch is arrested by police officer AI Zass, while bobby, Moon and Camille are later jailed afteran illegal drag race. The groups later goes to an amusement park. Chooch gets sick, but Bobby learns to dance and Greg and his dream girl Camille hit it off. Wanda, after hooking up with Bobby in his van, resists the attentions of police officer "Zass," and escapes by handcuffing him to his police car. After a visit to the doctor after Greg gets lockjaw, Chooch meets Wanda and they play air hockey. After everyone is paired off, Chooch admits his name is "Leon" and he and Wanda decide to leave and get married, and Greg and Camille are a couple, but Bobby stills needs to prove his manhood by beating Moon in a drag race in their respective vans. He wins, but Moon leaves him because he loves his van instead of her. To prove he loves her more, Bobby jumps clear as his van goes over a cliff. Moon, confused by his crazy behavior, drives off, but comes back and hugs Bobby as Greg, Camille, Leon, and Wanda circle them in cars.

Because director William Sachs' style is often rather absurdist, a number of comedic scenes in the B plot of police officer Zass on the beach, being handcuffed to his car, show a gradually more and more absurd tone as the film progresses. In the course of the film, he gets approached by a mysterious biker stealing his possessions, a dog and ultimately, towards the end of the film, his own mother who is worried about her boy while police searches for his location. The film ends with Zass buying Leon's car and getting harassed by another police officer himself for driving on Van Nuys Boulevard.

== Cast ==
The cast includes:

- Bill Adler as Bobby
- Cynthia Wood as Moon
- Dennis Bowen as Greg
- Melissa Prophet as Camille
- David Hayward as Leon Barnes "Chooch"
- Tara Strohmeier as Wanda
- The Kansas City Kings Glitter Girls

== Production ==
The time between the initial ideas for the film and its release was merely three months. It was filmed in eighteen days. For the scene in which two cars are smashed, the director originally wanted the cars to be wrecked completely, with doors flying off and other parts being destroyed. He jokingly recalls that while filming, they discovered that modern cars were better built than expected, so the damage done with hammers and other tools turned out to be not as severe as originally planned.

== Reception ==
Some reviewers have been complimentary and the film has acquired cult film status.

[A] good natured summer season comedy ... Writer-director William Sachs has taken a fast, light touch.

— Los Angeles Times, review of Van Nuys Blvd.

A film that Sachs intended to be something of a satire of "car movies," and easily the most technically competent Vansploitation film.

— Jason Coffman, article about Van Nuys Blvd.

Sachs has directed the proceedings with an affecting light touch.

— The Hollywood Reporter, review of Van Nuys Blvd.
