= Malibu Beach (film) =

- Directed by: Robert J. Rosenthal
- Screenplay by: Celia Susan Cotelo; Robert J. Rosenthal
- Produced by: Marilyn Jacobs Tenser
- Starring: Kim Lankford; James Daughton; Susan Player; Michael Luther; Steve Oliver; Flora Plumb
- Cinematography: Jamie Anderson
- Edited by: Robert Barrere
- Music by: Michael Lloyd
- Distributed by: Crown International Pictures
- Release date: 1978
- Running time: 96 minutes
- Country: United States
- Language: English

Malibu Beach is a 1978 American film directed by Robert J. Rosenthal.

== Premise ==
Young people have adventures over the summer.

== Cast ==
- Kim Lankford as Dina
- James Daughton as Bobby
- Susan Player as Sally
- Michael Luther as Paul
- Steve Oliver as Dugan
- Flora Plumb as Ms. Plickett
- Roger Lawrence Pierce as Claude
- Sherry Lee Marks as Margie
- Tara Strohmeier as Glorianna
- Rory Stevens as Charlie
- Parris Buckner as Rodney
- Bruce Kimball as Lyle
- Bill Adler as Vanner
- Walter Maslow as Harold

== Reception ==
The film made $2.25 million. Reviews were generally poor. However the Los Angeles Times called it "pleasant as a summer holiday" and "tinged with a poingnant sense of youth's fleetingness."
