= The Beach Girls =

1982 film by Bud Townsend

- Theatrical poster
- Directed by: Pat Townsend
- Written by: Patrick Sheane Duncan; Phil Groves
- Produced by: Marilyn Jacobs Tenser; Michael D. Castle
- Starring: Jeana Tomasino; Val Kline; Debra Blee; James Daughton; Adam Roarke
- Cinematography: Michael D. Murphy
- Edited by: George Bowers
- Music by: Michael Lloyd
- Distributed by: Crown International Pictures
- Release date: March 26, 1982
- Running time: 91 minutes
- Country: United States
- Language: English
- Box office: $2.7 million

The Beach Girls is a 1982 American sex comedy film directed by Pat Townsend. It stars Jeana Tomasino, Val Kline and Debra Blee.

== Plot ==
Two college girls, Ducky and Ginger, meet their naive friend, Sarah, at a Southern California beach house. The house belongs to Sarah's uncle and to their luck has allowed them to use his house for the summer while he is gone. Soon after Ducky and Ginger arrive, the two plan the first of many wild parties, but not without some resistance from Sarah. The two continue the plans for more partying including inviting assorted misfits, delivery persons, and people just passing by. Eventually, Sarah's resistance fades and she joins in on the wild parties.

== Main cast ==
- Jeana Tomasino as "Ducky"
- Debra Blee as Sarah
- Val Kline as Ginger
- James Daughton as Scott Daniels
- Adam Roarke as Carl Purdue
- Herb Braha as Captain Blye
- Bert Rosario as Gardener
- Dan Barrows as Mr. Brinker
- Mary Jo Catlett as Mrs. Brinker
- Fern Fitzgerald as Julie
- Tessa Richarde as Doreen
- Judson Vaughn as Lieutenant Gower

== Reception ==
Though most reviews took easy pot shots at this low-brow comedy fare, Linda Gross wrote in The Los Angeles Times that the film is a "cheery, unpretentious, youth exploitation midsummer's sex fantasy with excellent production values." Among other reviews, one stated, "frankly, the film's only saleable attractions are those of the leading actresses--and I would certainly hesitate to call them actresses. In summary, The Beach Girls attacks the senses like a beached whale that's been deteriorating in the sun for 24 hours." Another review noted that "for all the nudity, prancing bodies, and overtures to hedonism, there is surprisingly little outright sex in the film." The Kansas City Star said the movie "enjoys the dubious distinction of being a worse comedy than Porky's, a feat this reviewer considered virtual impossible."

The film had an eight-week production schedule. The Hollywood Reporter stated in July 1982 that the movie had grossed over $12 million.

== See also ==
- List of American films of 1982
