= Sam Grossman =

American film director

- Born: Sam Grossman; May 27, 1945; New York City
- Died: February 22, 1999 (aged 53); Los Angeles
- Education: New York University; American Film Institute
- Occupations: Film director, writer
- Years active: 1976–1999

Sam Grossman was an American film director and writer, mainly known for The Van, and for directing various music documentaries in the 1980s. Additionally, he wrote several stage plays and worked "extensively" in television. He died of cancer at his home in West Los Angeles on February 22, 1999.
