= Debra Neil-Fisher =

American film editor (born 1958)

Debra C. Neil-Fisher
- Born: May 12, 1958 (age 68); Los Angeles, California, U.S.
- Occupation: Film editor

Debra C. Neil-Fisher (born May 12, 1958) is an American film editor. She has worked on several major films, including the Hangover series of movies.

== Life and career ==
Neil-Fisher was born in Los Angeles. She grew up in the San Fernando Valley and studied at the girls' school Argyll Academy until 1976, where a film course was offered that aroused her early interest in film. After her graduation in 1980, at the age of 21, she went back to her father and helped him in his dental practice. And, although many of his patients worked in film business, no one could help her get there. It was only through a few of her acquaintances that she could make contact with a producer who offered her an assistant in an editing studio. After she accepted this, her first job was with a Rich Little spot for one of his Las Vegas shows. After one year, she left the company again.

== Filmography (selection) ==
Editor
Year	Film	Director	Notes
1991	V.I. Warshawski	Jeff Kanew	Third collaboration with Jeff Kanew
1991	Fried Green Tomatoes	Jon Avnet	First collaboration with Jon Avnet
1992	Dr. Giggles	Manny Coto	
1994	The War	Jon Avnet	Second collaboration with Jon Avnet
1996	Up Close & Personal	Jon Avnet	Third collaboration with Jon Avnet
1996	Dear God	Garry Marshall	
1997	Austin Powers: International Man of Mystery	Jay Roach	First collaboration with Jay Roach
1998	Black Dog	Kevin Hooks	
1999	Austin Powers: The Spy Who Shagged Me	Jay Roach	Second collaboration with Jay Roach
1999	Teaching Mrs. Tingle	Kevin Williamson	
2000	Beautiful	Sally Field	
2001	Saving Silverman	Dennis Dugan	First collaboration with Dennis Dugan
2003	National Security	Dennis Dugan	Second collaboration with Dennis Dugan
2003	How to Lose a Guy in 10 Days	Donald Petrie	First collaboration with Donald Petrie
2004	Welcome to Mooseport	Donald Petrie	Second collaboration with Donald Petrie
2004	Without a Paddle	Steven Brill	
2005	Son of the Mask	Lawrence Guterman	
2006	Just My Luck	Donald Petrie	Third collaboration with Donald Petrie
2006	You, Me and Dupree	Russo brothers	
2008	Semi-Pro	Kent Alterman	
2008	Baby Mama	Michael McCullers	
2009	The Hangover	Todd Phillips	First collaboration with Todd Phillips
2010	Due Date	Todd Phillips	Second collaboration with Todd Phillips
2011	The Hangover Part II	Todd Phillips	Third collaboration with Todd Phillips
2013	The Hangover Part III	Todd Phillips	Fourth collaboration with Todd Phillips
2015	Fifty Shades of Grey	Sam Taylor-Johnson	
2016	Grimsby	Louis Leterrier	
2016	Teenage Mutant Ninja Turtles: Out of the Shadows	Dave Green	
2017	Transformers: The Last Knight	Michael Bay	
2018	Fifty Shades Freed	James Foley	
2019	A Dog's Way Home	Charles Martin Smith	
2020	Sonic the Hedgehog	Jeff Fowler	
2021	Coming 2 America	Craig Brewer	
2026	Relationship Goals	Linda Mendoza	

Editorial department
Year	Film	Director	Role	Notes	Other notes	Ref.
1984	Children of the Corn	Fritz Kiersch	Assistant editor			
1984	Revenge of the Nerds	Jeff Kanew	Assistant editor	First collaboration with Jeff Kanew	Uncredited	
1985	Gotcha!	Jeff Kanew	Assistant editor	Second collaboration with Jeff Kanew		
1988	Dixie Lanes	Don Cato	Location editor: U.S.			
2008	Role Models	David Wain	Additional editor			
2010	Cats & Dogs: The Revenge of Kitty Galore	Brad Peyton	Additional editor			
2011	The Change-Up	David Dobkin	Additional editor			
2012	Ted	Seth MacFarlane	Additional editor	First collaboration with Seth MacFarlane		
2014	A Million Ways to Die in the West	Seth MacFarlane	Additional editor	Second collaboration with Seth MacFarlane		
2014	Dumb and Dumber To	Farrelly brothers	Additional editor			
2015	Ted 2	Seth MacFarlane	Additional editor	Third collaboration with Seth MacFarlane		
2022	The Bubble	Judd Apatow	Additional editor			
2023	Barbie	Greta Gerwig	Additional editor			
2025	Code 3	Christopher Leone	Additional editor			

Additional crew
Year	Film	Director	Role
2023	Old Dads	Bill Burr	Consultant

Director
Year	Film
2022	Unplugging

Producer
Year	Film	Director	Credit
2011	A Good Old Fashioned Orgy	Alex Gregory; Peter Huyck	Co-producer
2020	Borat Subsequent Moviefilm	Jason Woliner	Co-producer

Thanks
Year	Film	Director	Role
2013	The Spectacular Now	James Ponsoldt	The producers wish to thank
2020	Golden Arm	Maureen Bharoocha	Special thanks
2023	Barbie	Greta Gerwig	Special thanks

Direct-to-video films

Editor
Year	Film	Director
2006	I Am Omega	Griff Furst

Documentaries

Editorial department
Year	Film	Director	Role
2016	Holy Hell	Will Allen	Consulting editor

Shorts

Editor
Year	Film	Director
1987	Ray's Male Heterosexual Dance Hall	Bryan Gordon

Thanks
Year	Film	Director	Role
2008	Cheerbleeders	Peter Podgursky	Special thanks

TV movies

Editor
Year	Film	Director
1988	My First Love	Gilbert Cates
1989	The Case of the Hillside Stranglers	Steve Gethers
1989	Teach 109	Richard Kletter
1989	Breaking Point	Peter Markle
1990	The Girl Who Came Between Them	Mel Damski
1990	Heat Wave	Kevin Hooks
1992	Memphis	Yves Simoneau
1992	Desperate Choices: To Save My Child	Andy Tennant
1993	The Amy Fisher Story	Andy Tennant

TV series

Editor
Year	Title	Notes
2002	Boomtown	1 episode
2017	How to Beat Your Sister-in-Law (at everything)	9 episodes

Director
Year	Title	Notes
2017	How to Beat Your Sister-in-Law (at everything)	3 episodes

Producer
Year	Title	Credit	Notes
2018	Who Is America?	Co-producer	7 episodes

TV specials

Editor
Year	Title
2020	Covid Is No Joke
