= Eric Jungmann =

American actor (born 1981)

- Born: December 2, 1981 (age 44); Orlando, Florida, U.S.
- Education: International School of the Americas
- Occupation: Actor
- Years active: 1998–present

Eric Joseph Jungmann (born December 2, 1981) is an American film and television actor perhaps best known for his role as "the obsessed best friend," Ricky Lipman in Not Another Teen Movie. He is also known for his role of Jain McManus in Night Stalker and had a recurring role of Ivan, Larry Beale's yes-man in the Disney Channel original sitcom Even Stevens.

== Early life ==
Jungmann was born in Orlando, Florida, the son of restaurateurs Janet and Jim Jungmann. He attended both the North East School of the Arts and the International School of the Americas, both in San Antonio, Texas.

== Career ==
Jungmann studied acting and filmmaking in Texas and began his career with small roles in local films like Varsity Blues and The Faculty. He later moved to Los Angeles where he landed roles in TV and in films like Not Another Teen Movie and Winning London. He collaborated as an actor on shows like Criminal Minds, True Blood, Veronica Mars, Even Stevens and Night Stalker as well as multiple feature films that premiered at film festivals such as Sundance, Tribeca, SXSW and Sitges.

Jungmann has appeared in TV commercials for worldwide brands including Apple, Nintendo, Subaru, Wendy's, Burger King and Canon.

== Filmography ==
=== Film ===
Year	Title	Role	Notes
1998	The Faculty	Freshman #1	
1999	Varsity Blues	Elliot	
1999	The Boy with the X-Ray Eyes	Sam	
2000	Star Patrol	Stevie Omega	TV pilot
2000	Drive In	Wayne	
2001	Winning London	Dylan	Video
2001	Not Another Teen Movie	Ricky Lipman	
2002	Outside	Patrick	Short film
2003	Monster Man	Adam	
2004	Sweden, Ohio	Actor	TV pilot
2005	Happy Endings	Charley Peppitone at 16 / Tom Kunitz	
2005	The Chumscrubber	Student #2	
2006	Military Intelligence and You!	Corp. Skip Andrews	
2008	Killer Pad	Craig	
2008	Red Velvet	Roy	
2009	TiMER	Manager Larry	
2013	Shotgun Wedding	Steven Doering	
2015	Urban Foraging	Damien	Short film
2015	Parallels	Harold	
2015	Of Fortune and Gold	Ryder	
2016	Sam, Again	Sam	
2016	Countdown	Malcolm	Short film
2017	Deep Like	Living room guy	Music video
2019	Santa Won't Leave	Guy	
2021	Body of the Mined	Victor	Short film; also director, writer and producer
2025	Code 3	Male Nurse	

=== Television ===
Year	Title	Role	Notes
1999	Walker, Texas Ranger	Johnny	1 episode
1999	3rd Rock from the Sun	Jerry	1 episode
1999	Roswell	Lester	1 episode
1998–2000	Sabrina, the Teenage Witch	Teenage Salem Boy	2 episodes
2000	Judging Amy	Victor Laughlin	1 episode
2000	Opposite Sex	Military student	1 episode
2000	Touched by an Angel	Jamie	1 episode
2000	As Told by Ginger	Chairlift operator (voice)	1 episode
2000	Boston Public	George Howe	1 episode
2000–2001	That's Life	Student	2 episodes
2000–2001	Even Stevens	Ivan	4 episodes
2002	Grounded for Life	Ticket clerk	1 episode
2002	The Guardian	Ignatius J. Reilly	1 episode
2004	8 Simple Rules	Max	1 episode
2005–2006	Night Stalker	Jain McManus	Main
2006	CSI: Crime Scene Investigation	Reese Bingham	1 episode
2006	Cold Case	Timmy 'Bones' Hamlin (1958)	1 episode
2007	Veronica Mars	Gil Thomas Pardy	1 episode
2007	Bones	Eddie	1 episode
2008	NCIS	Andy Pringle	1 episode
2009	CSI: Miami	Zack Finley	1 episode
2010	True Blood	Chip	1 episode
2011	Memphis Beat	Joey Ekler	1 episode
2011	Criminal Minds	Robert "Bob" Adams	1 episode
2012	NCIS: Los Angeles	Adam Malnick	1 episode
2013	Castle	Bram Stoker	1 episode
2013	King & Maxwell	Arnold	1 episode
2017	Major Crimes	Jeffrey Day	1 episode
