= Dianne Hull =

American actress (born 1949)

- Born: November 24, 1949 (age 76)
- Occupations: Actress, acting coach
- Years active: 1969–1991

Dianne Hull (born November 24, 1949) is an American former actress whose film career spanned from 1969 to the early 1990s. The films she has acted in include The Magic Garden of Stanley Sweetheart, Aloha, Bobby and Rose, The Arrangement, Christmas Evil, The Onion Field and The Fifth Floor.

== Biography ==
Hull is the daughter of model and actress Lorrie Hull and her first husband. Along with her mother, she has had an interest in cryonics and has attended the local cryonics group meetings and gatherings. Hull became a method acting teacher. Her mother Lorrie was cryopreserved by the Alcor Life Extension Foundation in January 2022.

== Career ==
Hull studied acting in California with Lee Strasberg, where she was discovered by Elia Kazan, who cast her in his 1969 film The Arrangement. In this, her film debut, she played the role of "Ellen Anderson," daughter of the main character "Eddie Anderson" played by Kirk Douglas.

In 1970 she starred as Cathy, the campus girlfriend of Don Johnson in The Magic Garden of Stanley Sweetheart. In 1975, she co-starred with Paul Le Mat in the Floyd Mutrux-directed Aloha, Bobby and Rose, a drama about a motor mechanic and a divorced single mother who accidentally cause the death of a store clerk during a fake robbery prank. Made on a budget of $600,000, Aloha, Bobby and Rose grossed $35 million in the United States during its theatrical run.

In 1978, Hull appeared in The Fifth Floor, playing the part of a disco dancer who collapses on a dance floor, is misdiagnosed and sent to a psychiatric ward, where she attracts the attention of an unbalanced orderly played by Bo Hopkins.

In 1980, she appeared in You Better Watch Out (also known as Christmas Evil), a low-budget, cult, horror film directed by Lewis Jackson, involving a twisted toymaker who dresses up as Santa Claus and goes on a murderous rampage. One of her last roles was in 1991, when she appeared in the made-for-television film Murder 101 that starred Pierce Brosnan.

== Filmography (selective) ==
=== Film ===
- 1969 The Arrangement as Ellen Anderson
- 1970 The Magic Garden of Stanley Sweetheart as Cathy
- 1972 Hot Summer Week as Karen
- 1974 Man on a Swing as Maggie Dawson
- 1975 Aloha, Bobby and Rose as Rose
- 1978 The Fifth Floor as Kelly McIntyre
- 1979 The Onion Field as Helen Hettinger
- 1980 Christmas Evil aka You Better Watch Out as Jackie Stadling
- 1980 Haywire as Bridget Hayward
- 1988 The New Adventures of Pippi Longstocking as Mrs. Settigren
- 1991 Murder 101 as Ellen Dowling

=== Television ===
- 1971 Hawaii Five-O - Season 4, Episode 5, "Two Doves and Mr. Heron," Broadcast October 12, 1971 as Cleo Michaels
- 1972 Cannon - Season 1, Episode 20, "A Deadly Quiet Town," Broadcast February 15, 1972 as Susan Glen
- 1972 All in the Family - Season 03 Episode 05, "Lionel Steps Out," Broadcast October 14, 1972 as Linda Bunker
- 1973 Police Story - Season 1, Episode 1 (premier), "Slow Boy" as Patti

== Coaching ==
As of 2009, Hull was working as an acting coach, giving lessons to working stage and film actors. She was also teaching classes. Her mother Lorrie Hull who Dianne has worked alongside, spent 12 years on the faculty of the Lee Strasberg Institute, and is the author of Strasberg's Method As Taught by Lorrie Hull.
