= William A. Fraker =

American film director, producer and cinematographer

- Born: William Ashman Fraker; September 29, 1923; Los Angeles, California, U.S.
- Died: May 31, 2010 (aged 86); Los Angeles, California, U.S.
- Education: USC School of Cinematic Arts
- Occupations: Cinematographer, film director
- Years active: 1956–2002
- Spouse: Denise

President of the American Society of Cinematographers
- In office 1979, 1984, 1991 – 1980, 1984, 1992

William Ashman Fraker, ASC, BSC (September 29, 1923 – May 31, 2010) was an American cinematographer and director.

Described as "one of America's most respected cinematographers," he was nominated for the Academy Award for Best Cinematography five times, and was a six-term President of the American Society of Cinematographers.

== Background ==
Fraker was born in Los Angeles, California, the son of a Hollywood studio photographer. His mother was a native of Mexico who had fled the Mexican Revolution with her family. Fraker's parents died during his childhood and he was subsequently raised by his Mexican grandmother, who instructed him in photography like she had with his father before him.

He served four years in either the U.S. Navy or the U.S. Coast Guard during World War II, seeing action in the Pacific. Fraker then attended USC under the G.I. Bill, graduating with a degree in Cinema.

He was admitted into the camera union in 1954 and subsequently spent years working in television before breaking into the film industry.

== Career ==
Fraker was nominated for the Academy Award for Best Cinematography five times - Looking For Mr. Goodbar (1977), Heaven Can Wait (1978), 1941 (1979), WarGames (1983), and Murphy's Romance (1985). He was also nominated for Best Visual Effects for 1941.

In addition to cinematography, Fraker also served as director on three theatrical films, Monte Walsh (1970), A Reflection of Fear (1971) and The Legend of the Lone Ranger (1981); as well as episodes of several television series.

Fraker was a six-term President of the American Society of Cinematographers (1979, 1980, 1984, 1991, 1992).

== Death and legacy ==
Aged 86, Fraker died on May 31, 2010, at Cedars-Sinai Medical Center in Los Angeles after a battle with cancer. He was survived by his wife Denise. He was predeceased in 1992 by son, William A. Fraker Jr., an assistant cameraman.

A room at the American Society of Cinematographers' clubhouse is named in honor of Fraker.

== Filmography ==
=== Cinematographer ===
==== Film ====
| Year | Title | Director | Notes |
|---|---|---|---|
| 1961 | Forbid Them Not | Robert L. Kimble | Also producer |
| 1967 | Games | Curtis Harrington | |
| 1967 | The Fox | Mark Rydell | |
| 1967 | The President's Analyst | Theodore J. Flicker | |
| 1968 | Rosemary's Baby | Roman Polanski | |
| 1968 | Bullitt | Peter Yates | |
| 1969 | Paint Your Wagon | Joshua Logan | |
| 1971 | Dusty and Sweets McGee | Floyd Mutrux | Also cast as "The Cellist" |
| 1973 | The Day of the Dolphin | Mike Nichols | |
| 1975 | Coonskin | Ralph Bakshi | |
| 1975 | Rancho Deluxe | Frank Perry | |
| 1975 | Aloha, Bobby and Rose | Floyd Mutrux | |
| 1976 | Gator | Burt Reynolds | |
| 1976 | The Killer Inside Me | Burt Kennedy | |
| 1977 | Exorcist II: The Heretic | John Boorman | |
| 1977 | Looking for Mr. Goodbar | Richard Brooks | |
| 1978 | American Hot Wax | Floyd Mutrux | |
| 1978 | Heaven Can Wait | Warren Beatty; Buck Henry | |
| 1979 | Old Boyfriends | Joan Tewkesbury | |
| 1979 | 1941 | Steven Spielberg | |
| 1980 | The Hollywood Knights | Floyd Mutrux | |
| 1981 | Sharky's Machine | Burt Reynolds | |
| 1982 | The Best Little Whorehouse in Texas | Colin Higgins | |
| 1982 | Hey Good Lookin' | Ralph Bakshi | Uncredited |
| 1983 | WarGames | John Badham | |
| 1984 | Irreconcilable Differences | Charles Shyer | Also cast as "Gabrielle Cinematographer" |
| 1984 | Protocol | Herbert Ross | |
| 1985 | Fever Pitch | Richard Brooks | |
| 1985 | Murphy's Romance | Martin Ritt | |
| 1986 | SpaceCamp | Harry Winer | |
| 1987 | Burglar | Hugh Wilson | |
| 1987 | Baby Boom | Charles Shyer | |
| 1989 | Chances Are | Emile Ardolino | |
| 1989 | An Innocent Man | Peter Yates | |
| 1990 | The Freshman | Andrew Bergman | |
| 1992 | Memoirs of an Invisible Man | John Carpenter | |
| 1992 | Honeymoon in Vegas | Andrew Bergman | |
| 1993 | Tombstone | George P. Cosmatos | Also associate producer |
| 1994 | There Goes My Baby | Floyd Mutrux | |
| 1994 | Street Fighter | Steven E. de Souza | |
| 1995 | Father of the Bride Part II | Charles Shyer | With Elliot Davis |
| 1996 | The Island of Dr. Moreau | John Frankenheimer | |
| 1997 | Vegas Vacation | Stephen Kessler | |
| 1997 | Broadway Brawler | Dennis Dugan; Lee Grant | Unfinished |
| 2000 | Rules of Engagement | William Friedkin | With Nicola Pecorini |
| 2001 | Town & Country | Peter Chelsom | Also 2nd unit director (South Carolina) |
| 2002 | Waking Up in Reno | Jordan Brady | |

Documentary film

| Year | Title | Director | Notes |
|---|---|---|---|
| 1975 | Fritz Lang Interviewed by William Friedkin | William Friedkin | |
| 1980 | Divine Madness | Michael Ritchie | Concert film |

==== Television ====
| Year | Title | Director | Notes |
|---|---|---|---|
| 1966-69 | Daktari | | |
| 1973 | Ozzie's Girls | Ozzie Nelson | Episode "Pilot" |
| 1987 | Frank's Place | Hugh Wilson | Episode "Pilot" |

TV movies

| Year | Title | Director |
|---|---|---|
| 1973 | Fade In | Jud Taylor (Note: Credited as Alan Smithee) |
| 1995 | Death in Small Doses | Sondra Locke |

=== Director ===
Film

| Year | Title | Notes |
|---|---|---|
| 1970 | Monte Walsh | |
| 1972 | A Reflection of Fear | |
| 1981 | The Legend of the Lone Ranger | |

Television

| Year | Title | Episode(s) |
|---|---|---|
| 1988 | Houston Knights | "Cajun Spice" |
| 1988 | J.J. Starbuck | "Rag Doll" |
| 1989 | Unsub | "Silent Stalker" |
| 1989 | B.L. Stryker | "The Dancer’s Touch" |
| 1989 | Wiseguy | "Fascination for the Flame" |
| 1989 | Wiseguy | "The Merchant of Death" |
| 1989 | Wiseguy | "How Will They Remember Me?" |
| 1989 | Wiseguy | "The Reunion" |
| 1989 | Wiseguy | "Day Seven" |
| 1989 | Wiseguy | "Sanctuary" |
| 1991 | The Flash | "Tina, Is That You?" |
| 1993 | Walker, Texas Ranger | "Night of the Gladiator" |

== Awards and nominations ==
| Year | Award | Category | Title | Result |
|---|---|---|---|---|
| 1977 | Academy Awards | Best Cinematography | Looking for Mr. Goodbar | Nominated |
| 1978 | Academy Awards | Best Cinematography | Heaven Can Wait | Nominated |
| 1979 | Academy Awards | Best Cinematography | 1941 | Nominated |
| 1979 | Academy Awards | Best Visual Effects | 1941 | Nominated |
| 1983 | Academy Awards | Best Cinematography | WarGames | Nominated |
| 1985 | Academy Awards | Best Cinematography | Murphy's Romance | Nominated |
| 1968 | BAFTA Awards | Best Cinematography | Bullitt | Nominated |
| 1983 | BAFTA Awards | Best Special Visual Effects | WarGames | Nominated |
| 1968 | National Society of Film Critics | Best Cinematography | Bullitt | Nominated |
| 2000 | American Society of Cinematographers | Lifetime Achievement Award | | Won |
| 2003 | Camerimage | Lifetime Achievement Award | | Won |
