= Dusty and Sweets McGee =

- Theatrical release poster
- Directed by: Floyd Mutrux
- Written by: Floyd Mutrux
- Produced by: Michael Laughlin; Floyd Mutrux
- Starring: Clifton Tip Fredell; Kit Ryder; Billy Gray; Bob Graham; Nancy Wheeler; Russ Knight
- Cinematography: William A. Fraker
- Edited by: Richard A. Harris
- Music by: Jake Holmes; Van Morrison; Ricky Nelson
- Production company: Warner Bros.
- Distributed by: Warner Bros.
- Release date: July 14, 1971
- Running time: 92 minutes
- Country: United States
- Language: English
- Budget: $350,000

Dusty and Sweets McGee is a 1971 American drama film written and directed by Floyd Mutrux. The film stars Clifton Tip Fredell, Kit Ryder, Billy Gray, Bob Graham, Nancy Wheeler and Russ Knight. The film was released by Warner Bros. on July 14, 1971.

== Plot ==
Dusty and Sweets McGee follows the two young addicts of the title as they idly spend their days in early 1970s Los Angeles. The camera rolls as the addicts roam the streets of LA from downtown to the beach. Car radios play the hits of the day as they aimlessly go about their drug-addicted lives. Eating hot dogs at Pink's, committing petty crime, scoring drugs and cruising the sunset strip are lovingly documented by Mutrux.

There is no plot, but what evolves is a portrait of lost, young souls adrift in a failed consumer society. Affluent America is all around them, shiny and sun-drenched like a beautiful California orange, but there is something rotten at the core of this fruit. Vietnam rages on, the Watts riots were still smoldering in people's minds to the South as the big, shiny convertibles rolled majestically down the endless freeways. Many neo-realist films, including this one, indict society for failing to provide for its citizens economically; Dusty and Sweets McGee seems to point a finger at spiritual deficit.

== Cast ==
- Clifton Tip Fredell as Tip
- Kit Ryder as Male Hustler
- Billy Gray as City Life
- Bob Graham as Little Boy
- Nancy Wheeler as Nancy
- Russ Knight as Weird Beard
- William A. Fraker as The Cellist

== Production ==
In the alternative Hollywood of the 1970s, director Floyd Mutrux got the green light to produce a film about young drug addicts. Eager to tap into the youth market, and without a clue of how to do it, studio heads signed off on the film despite it having no viable script. It was instead based on some interviews with actual drug addicts.

== Reception ==
Filmmaker Thom Andersen praised the film for its "lyricism, sense of wonder and humor".

=== Controversy ===
In 1998, film critic Leonard Maltin settled a libel suit brought by cast member Billy Gray, whom Maltin had identified in his review of the film as a real-life drug addict and dealer. The statement had appeared in print for nearly 25 years in Maltin's annual movie guide before Maltin publicly apologized for the error.

== See also ==
- List of American films of 1971
- Aloha Bobby and Rose
- New Hollywood
