= Red Velvet (film) =

- Directed by: Bruce Dickson
- Written by: Anthony Burns; Joe Moe
- Produced by: Jim McConville; Sean Fernald; Ari Citak; Joe Moe
- Starring: Henry Thomas; Kelli Garner; Natalia Baron; Eric Jungmann; Forrest J Ackerman
- Cinematography: Jim Dickson
- Edited by: Jonathan Alvord
- Production company: Ulalume Films
- Distributed by: Amazon Exclusive
- Release dates: March 8, 2008 (Texas Fear Fest); August 28, 2009 (United States – DVD)
- Running time: 87 minutes
- Country: United States
- Language: English

Red Velvet is a 2008 American independent horror film directed by Bruce Dickson and written by Anthony Burns and Joe Moe. The film stars Henry Thomas and Kelli Garner and is the final film of Forrest J Ackerman.

== Premise ==
A man meets a young woman, leading to a tale wherein a man in a white suit kills everyone at a birthday party.

== Cast ==
- Henry Thomas as Aaron
- Kelli Garner as Linda
- Forrest J Ackerman as himself
- Natalia Baron as Amy
- Eric Jungmann as Roy
- S.A. Griffin as father
- Carol Ann Susi as mother
- Carlie Westerman as sister
- Austin Whitlock as brother
- Kevin Wheatley as Jon
- Lateef Crowder as maniac
- Earl Roesel as maniac
- Lewis Tan as maniac
- Cristen Coppen as Pat
- Bret Roberts as Frank
- Ryan Doom as Ken
- Jordan Hagan as Kyle
- Michele Nordin as Jenny

== Reception ==
Thomas M. Sipos of Hollywood Investigator wrote that it is a slasher film but not quite a horror film. And of the film's protagonist, wrote "He's psychotic, but he's also vulnerable, literate, and identifiable. He has more common with the suspense psychos of Psycho and Frenzy than with the superhuman psychos of Halloween and its progeny." Dread Central wrote that "Henry Thomas yet again proves to be one of those hidden gems", and that "Red Velvet is deranged and inspired in equal measures, sometimes both at the same time."
