= Martine Bartlett =

American actress (1925–2006)

- Born: April 24, 1925; St. Louis, Missouri, U.S.
- Died: April 5, 2006 (aged 80); Tempe, Arizona, U.S.
- Education: Washington University in St. Louis (BA); Yale University (MFA)
- Occupation: Actress
- Years active: 1951–1983

Martine Bartlett (April 24, 1925 – April 5, 2006) was an American actress. A life member of The Actors Studio, Bartlett is best-remembered, albeit not by name, for her chilling performance as Hattie Dorsett, the seriously disturbed, abusive mother of Sally Field's title character in Sybil.

== Career ==
She was active onstage with the former St. Louis Community Playhouse, Rooftop Players and the old Empress Theater. She received her master's degree at the Graduate Drama School at Yale. Her debut on Broadway was as a townsperson in The Devil's Disciple (1950). She was part of the ensemble cast in Saint Joan (1951), starring Uta Hagen.

Her first television appearance was in an episode of Robert Montgomery Presents titled "The Man Who Vanished" (1956). Her other appearances include episodes on The Twilight Zone, The Fugitive, Dr. Kildare, The Virginian, Kojak, Cannon, Mission: Impossible, and Quincy, M.E. She was nominated for an Emmy Award for Outstanding Performance in a Supporting Role by an Actress for her performance in an episode of the series Arrest and Trial ("Journey Into Darkness", 1963).

She returned to Broadway in 1957 and played the role as Loreena Lovejoy in Carson McCullers' The Square Root of Wonderful (starring Anne Baxter). Bartlett appeared as the kindly Aunt Nonnie in the original Broadway production of Tennessee Williams' Sweet Bird of Youth (1959).

Her motion picture debut was as the English teacher Miss Metcalf in Splendor in the Grass (1961), starring Natalie Wood and Warren Beatty. Other films in which she appeared include The Prize (1963) and Lord Love a Duck (1966). She played Alma Mulloy, the first victim of Rod Steiger's serial killer in No Way to Treat a Lady (1968). She played the delusional prostitute Sadie in Fuzz (1972); played Raquel Welch's mother (and Jodie Foster's grandmother) in Kansas City Bomber (1972); and appeared in Aloha, Bobby and Rose (1975).

Bartlett portrayed the "Secret Wife", a self-abusing mental patient, in I Never Promised You a Rose Garden (1977). In the NBC miniseries Sybil (1976), Bartlett played Hattie Dorsett, Sybil's psychotic mother who appears in flashbacks abusing and tormenting a very young Sybil (played by Natasha Ryan), garnering acclaim for her performance. She made her last known appearance in an episode of the television series Remington Steele (1983).

== Death ==
Bartlett died on April 5, 2006, in Tempe, Arizona, aged 80. She is buried in Calvary Cemetery in St. Louis, Missouri. She was survived by a brother and sister.

== Filmography ==
=== Film ===
| Year | Title | Role | Notes |
|---|---|---|---|
| 1961 | Splendor in the Grass | Miss Metcalf | |
| 1963 | The Prize | Saralee Garrett | |
| 1966 | Lord Love a Duck | Inez | |
| 1968 | No Way to Treat a Lady | Alma Mulloy | |
| 1972 | Fuzz | Sadie | |
| 1972 | Kansas City Bomber | Mrs. Carr | |
| 1975 | Aloha, Bobby and Rose | Rose's mother | |
| 1977 | I Never Promised You a Rose Garden | Secret Wife | |

=== Television ===
| Year | Title | Role | Notes |
|---|---|---|---|
| 1954 | Kraft Television Theatre | Mrs. Elton | "Emma" |
| 1958 | The United States Steel Hour | Miss Fraser | "One Red Rose for Christmas" |
| 1961 | Naked City | Receptionist | "A Memory of Crying" |
| 1963 | Ben Jerrod | Lil Morrison | TV series |
| 1963 | Dr. Kildare | Mrs. Goodwin | "The Sleeping Princess" |
| 1963 | The Alfred Hitchcock Hour | Flossie | Season 1 Episode 24: "The Star Juror" |
| 1963 | The Alfred Hitchcock Hour | Mrs. Bergen | Season 2 Episode 6: "Nothing Ever Happens in Linville" |
| 1963 | Breaking Point | Miss Newly | "And James Was a Very Small Snail" |
| 1963 | Arrest and Trial | Miranda Ledoux Porter | "Journey Into Darkness" |
| 1964 | The Twilight Zone | Miss Finch | "Night Call" |
| 1964 | The Lieutenant | Stella Bonney | "In the Highest Tradition" |
| 1964 | The Fugitive | Streetwalker | "The End Game" |
| 1964 | The Eleventh Hour | Ina Danholt | "The Color of Sunset" |
| 1965 | Profiles in Courage | Caroline | "Daniel Webster" |
| 1965 | The Big Valley | Cinda Bentell | "The Guilt of Matt Bentell" |
| 1966 | The Virginian | Margaret McKinley | "One Spring Like Long Ago" |
| 1966 | Mission: Impossible | Ariana Domi | "Zubrovnik's Ghost" |
| 1967 | CBS Playhouse | Margaret | "Do Not Go Gentle Into That Good Night" |
| 1967 | Judd, for the Defense | Grace Garrison | "Death from a Flower Girl" |
| 1968 | The Felony Squad | Leona Corbett | "The Love Victim" |
| 1969 | Then Came Bronson | Nora Halvorsen | "The Old Motorcycle Fiasco" |
| 1970 | The Mod Squad | Mrs. Farrell | "Sweet Child of Terror" |
| 1970 | Medical Center | Stella Hibbs | "Fright and Flight" |
| 1970 | The Immortal | Mrs. Adkins | "The Return" |
| 1971 | Big Fish, Little Fish | Edith Maitland | TV film |
| 1972 | The Sixth Sense | Carrie | "Dear Joan: We're Going to Scare You to Death" |
| 1973 | Cannon | Hanna Freel | "He Who Digs a Grave" |
| 1973 | Owen Marshall: Counselor at Law | Mary Gregson | "Sometimes Tough Is Good" |
| 1974 | The Manhunter | Mady Gordon | "The Lodester Ambush" |
| 1975 | Attack on Terror: The FBI vs. the Ku Klux Klan | Bea Sutton | TV film |
| 1975 | Lincoln | Kitty Cavan | "Prairie Lawyer" |
| 1975 | Kojak | Margaret McCune | "A House of Prayer, a Den of Thieves" |
| 1975 | Cannon | Maybelle Tweedy | "The Conspirators" |
| 1976 | Cannon | Madge Cleary | "The House of Cards" |
| 1976 | Sybil | Hattie Dorsett | TV miniseries |
| 1981 | Sizzle | Freda | TV film |
| 1982 | Quincy, M.E. | Sobriety Group Member | "Dying for a Drink" |
| 1983 | Remington Steele | Millicent | "Steele Flying High" (final appearance) |
