= The Fifth Floor =

1978 American thriller film

- Directed by: Howard Avedis
- Written by: Meyer Dolinsky
- Produced by: Howard Avedis
- Starring: Bo Hopkins; Dianne Hull; Patti D'Arbanville; Sharon Farrell; Robert Englund; Anthony James; Julie Adams; Mel Ferrer; John David Carson; Earl Boen; Betty Kean; Alice Nunn; Cathey Paine; Udana Power; Maggie Appel
- Cinematography: Daniel Pearl
- Edited by: Stanford C. Allen
- Music by: Alan Silvestri
- Distributed by: Film Ventures International
- Release date: November 15, 1978
- Running time: 90 minutes
- Country: United States
- Language: English
- Box office: $3,775,000

The Fifth Floor is a 1978 American thriller film about a sane woman who gets sent to an asylum. It stars Dianne Hull, Bo Hopkins and Mel Ferrer.

== Plot ==
The film focuses on Kelly McIntyre, a disco dancer played by Dianne Hull who through no fault of her own accidentally overdoses on drugs and collapses at a disco. She is misdiagnosed as suicidal and sent to a psychiatric ward which is on the fifth floor of Cedar Springs Hospital. There she finds herself alone with no help, not even from her boyfriend who refuses to get her out of there. She becomes the subject of interest by an unbalanced orderly played by Bo Hopkins.

== Cast ==
- Bo Hopkins as Carl
- Dianne Hull as Kelly McIntyre
- Patti D'Arbanville as Cathy
- Sharon Farrell as Melanie
- Robert Englund as Benny
- Anthony James as Derrick
- Julie Adams as Nurse Hannelord
- Mel Ferrer as Dr. Sidney Coleman
- John David Carson as Ronnie Denton
- Earl Boen as Phil
- Betty Kean as Sophy
- Alice Nunn as Emma
- Cathey Paine as Lois
- Udana Power as Nurse Whelan
- Maggie Appel as Mental Patient
- Howard Avedis as Occupational Therapist
- Gregory J. Barnett as Deputy Sheriff
- Michael Berryman as Mental Patient
- Chuck Boyd as Douglas Crawford
- Pattie Brooks as Disco Singer
- Bob Herron as Sheriff
- Peter Horak as The Driver
- M.G. Kelly as Hal
- Barbara Ellen Lyle as Francine
- Milt Kogan as Dr. Shaw
- Marie Marq as Jinny
- Suzanne Niles as Doreen
- Mary Ellen O'Neill as Mental Patient
- Grant Owens as Jerry
- Alan Sands as Mental Patient
- Marlene Schmidt as Night Nurse
- Lee Stein as Lou
- Bruce Stidham as Dr. Morgan
- Duane Tucker as Psych Tech
- Tracey Walter as Mental Patient
- Chance Boyer as Kid At Zoo
