= Yorgo Constantine =

American actor

- Notable work: Murder 101, Beverly Hills, 90210, Phone Booth, Resurrection Blvd., Live Free or Die Hard, Fast Five, Parallels

Yorgo Constantine Yfantopoulos is an American-Greek actor who began his career in 1991 with the television movie Murder 101. Following that he had several roles in both film and television, such as in Beverly Hills, 90210 (1998), Phone Booth (2002), Resurrection Blvd. (2002), Live Free or Die Hard (2007), Fast Five (2011), and Parallels (2015).

== Biography ==
Yorgo Constantine grew up in Lower Manhattan, New York City. He lived part of his early life in the Greenwich Village neighborhood, and later moved to the Tribeca neighborhood. Though he identifies as an American, his father is from the Pangrati area of Athens, Greece.

Though Constantine originally aspired to work a career playing professional tennis, he grew interested instead in acting while attending New York University, where he decided to pursue acting professionally. At nineteen or twenty years old, Constantine was brought to Los Angeles, a move he credits for allowing him to go on to act in big Hollywood movies; otherwise, he "probably would have stayed in New York City."

== Filmography ==
Highlights of his productions include:

=== Film ===
Year	Title	Role	Notes
1995	Return to Two Moon Junction	Robert Lee	
1996	Hostile Intentions	Kris	
1998	Why Do Fools Fall in Love	The Announcer	
2000	Cement	Danny	
2002	Phone Booth	ESU Commander	
2002	Fits and Starts	Serge	
2004	Target	Yevon Bodnar	
2004	The Last Shot	First AD	
2005	Shopgirl	Manager	Uncredited
2006	Catch and Release	Employee	
2007	Fracture	Russian lawyer	
2007	Live Free or Die Hard	Russo	
2007	Death Sentence	Michael Barring	
2011	Dead Space: Aftermath	Commander Sergenko	Voice
2011	Fast Five	Chato	
2011	Alyce Kills	Warner	
2012	Stand Up Guys	Paul	
2015	Parallels	Alex Carver	
2016	You Only Live Once	Alex	

=== Television ===
Year	Title	Role	Notes
1991	Murder 101	Jon Steinmetz	TV movie
1991	A Mother's Justice	Danny Pryne	TV movie
1993	A Perry Mason Mystery: The Case of the Wicked Wives		TV movie
1993	Columbo	Station Manager	Episode: "Butterfly in Shades of Grey"
1994	Diagnosis Murder	Andy	Episode: "Flashdance with Death"
1995	Renegade	Timothy Powers	Episode: "Family Ties"
1996	Arli$$	Jerry Riviera	Episode: "Colors of the Rainbow"
1998	Beverly Hills, 90210	Frank Saunders	2 episodes
1998	Silk Stalkings	Mr. Nelson	Episode: "Genius"
2000	The Huntress	Clarence Battle	Episode: "Springing Tiny"
2001	Gideon's Crossing	Dr. Jeff	Episode: "Filaments and Ligatures "
2001	18 Wheels of Justice	Bill Longtree	Episode: "The Game"
2001	Gone to Maui	A Dealer	TV movie
2001-2002	Roswell	Agent Burns	2 episodes
2002	Resurrection Blvd.	Washburn	5 episodes
2005	Joan of Arcadia	Vladamir Karpovic	Episode: "Game Theory"
2005	Las Vegas	Jerry Garret	Episode: "To Protect and Serve Manicotti"
2005	Entourage	Bouncer	Episode: "Aquamansion"
2006	24	Mikhail	3 episodes
2006	Faceless		TV movie
2007	ER	Trekkie	Episode: "Lights Out"
2007	Close to Home	Phil Deshayes	2 episodes
2008	In Plain Sight	Richie Mastro	Episode: "Pilot"
2008	Depth Charge	Andreyev	TV movie
2008	The Shield	Khalulian	Episode: "Money Shot"
2008	Knight Rider	Jackson	Episode: "A Knight in Shining Armor"
2009	Without a Trace	Grisha	Episode: "Heartbeats"
2009	The Unit	Armen Kochenko	Episode: "Unknown Soldier"
2013	Shameless	Dr. Markman	Episode: "Survival of the Fittest"
2013	Mob City	Ace	2 episodes
2014	Intelligence	Marius Cottier	Episode: "Red X"
2014–2015	Madam Secretary	Russian Foreign Minister Anton Gorev	5 episodes
2016	MacGyver	Sevchenko	Episode: "Wire Cutter"
2016	Rounds	Zoran	Episode: "Pilot"
2018	Deception	Kostya Veradin	Episode: "Transposition"

=== Video games ===
Year	Title	Role	Notes
2008	The Bourne Conspiracy		voice
2015	Devil's Third	Ivan	voice
2020	Call of Duty: Black Ops Cold War		voice
