= Alyce Kills =

- Directed by: Jay Lee
- Written by: Jay Lee
- Produced by: Zak Kilberg; Linda L. Miller
- Starring: Jade Dornfeld; Tamara Feldman; James Duval; Eddie Rouse; Larry Cedar; Yorgo Constantine; Megan Gallagher; Rena Owen; Tracey Walter; Bret Roberts
- Cinematography: Jay Lee
- Edited by: Jay Lee
- Music by: Billy White Acre
- Production companies: Social Construct; Scream HQ
- Distributed by: Bloody Disgusting
- Release dates: 24 September 2011 (Calgary International Film Festival); 21 May 2013 (VOD)
- Running time: 87 minutes
- Country: United States
- Language: English

Alyce Kills, originally titled Alyce, is a 2011 American horror thriller film directed by Jay Lee, starring Jade Dornfeld, Tamara Feldman, James Duval, Eddie Rouse, Larry Cedar, Yorgo Constantine, Megan Gallagher, Rena Owen, Tracey Walter and Bret Roberts.

== Cast ==
- Jade Dornfeld as Alyce
- Tamara Feldman as Carroll
- James Duval as Vince
- Eddie Rouse as Rex
- Larry Cedar as Harold
- Yorgo Constantine as Lt. Warner
- Megan Gallagher as Ginny
- Rena Owen as Danielle
- Tracey Walter as Landlord
- Bret Roberts as Mike
- Max Williams as Kurt

== Release ==
The film was released on VOD on 21 May 2013. It was released in select theatres on 24 May. The film was released as a DVD on 20 August.

== Reception ==
Bill Gibron of DVD Talk wrote a favourable review of the film, recommending it for its approach and its aftermath. Kalebson of Dread Central rated the film a 3.5 out of 5, writing, "Aside from a few characters lacking depth and experience, a slightly slow pace to kick things off and a few plot holes here and there, we have a great story and a good film in the grand scheme of things." Doc Rotten of HorrorNews.net rated the film 3.5 stars out of 5, writing, "It takes a bit to get going and to find its feet; but, once Alyce delves into madness, the film errupts as it inches closer and closer into her deteriorating mind". Mark L. Miller of Ain't It Cool News wrote a positive review of the film, calling it "a fantastic horror film in that it takes you to unexpected places and makes you wriggle and twist while on that dark journey."

Chuck Bowen of Slant Magazine rated the film 2.5 stars out of 4, criticising the first hour of the film, while calling the third act "a small triumph, as the requisite violence is a peculiar blend of the cartoonish and the legitimately grisly." Brad McHargue of Dread Central was more critical in his review of the film, rating it a 2 out of 5, and calling it "a film that tries just too damned hard to be more than it really is."
