= Unplugging =

2022 film by Debra Neil-Fisher

- Theatrical release poster
- Directed by: Debra Neil-Fisher
- Written by: Brad Morris; Matt Walsh
- Produced by: William Santor; John Griffith; Doug Murray; Brad Morris; Matt Walsh; Debbie Liebling; Carissa Buffel; Kevin Matusow
- Starring: Eva Longoria; Matt Walsh; Nicole Byer; Al Madrigal; Lea Thompson; Keith David
- Cinematography: Federico Cantini
- Edited by: David Clark
- Music by: Leo Birenberg
- Production companies: Traveling Picture Show Company; Productivity Media; Inner Child Productions; Roxwell Films
- Distributed by: Vertical Entertainment
- Release date: April 22, 2022
- Country: United States
- Language: English
- Box office: $20,500

Unplugging is a 2022 American comedy film directed by Debra Neil-Fisher, in her directorial debut, from a screenplay by Brad Morris and Matt Walsh. It stars Walsh, Eva Longoria, Lea Thompson, Keith David, Nicole Byer, and Al Madrigal. It was released on April 22, 2022, by Vertical Entertainment.

== Premise ==
A couple goes on a no-tech road trip to a remote mountain town.

== Cast ==
- Eva Longoria as Jeanine Dewerson
- Matt Walsh as Dan Dewerson
- Nicole Byer as Officer Dunn
- Al Madrigal as Juan
- Lea Thompson as Brenda Perkins
- Keith David as T-Bone
- Joel Kim Booster as Phil
- Johnny Pemberton as Tim
- Hala Finley as Elizabeth "Blizzard" Dewerson
- Morgan Walsh as Florence
- Emmett Walsh as Carlito
- Pat Walsh as Frank

== Production ==
In May 2019, it was announced Matt Walsh and Isla Fisher had joined the cast of the film, with Debra Neil-Fisher making her directorial debut, from a screenplay by Walsh and Brad Morris, with Walsh and Morris set to produce the film. In October 2020, Eva Longoria, Lea Thompson, Keith David, Nicole Byer, and Al Madrigal joined the cast of the film, with Longoria replacing Fisher.

Principal photography began in October 2020. The film was shot in various locations in Oklahoma in the US, including Tulsa.

== Release ==
Unplugging was released on April 22, 2022, by Vertical Entertainment.

== Reception ==
In the United States and Canada, the film earned an estimated $20,500 from 101 theaters in its opening weekend.

On the review aggregator website Rotten Tomatoes, 14% of 14 reviews are positive, with an average rating of 3.8/10.
