= Murder 101 (1991 film) =

- DVD cover
- Genre: Mystery; Thriller
- Written by: Bill Condon; Roy Johansen
- Directed by: Bill Condon
- Starring: Pierce Brosnan; Dey Young; Antoni Corone
- Music by: Philip Giffin
- Country of origin: United States
- Original language: English

Production
- Executive producer: Alan Barnette
- Producer: Oscar L. Costo
- Cinematography: Stephen M. Katz
- Editor: Stephen Lovejoy
- Running time: 100 minutes
- Production companies: Alan Barnette Productions; MCA Television Entertainment
- Budget: $2.5 million

Original release
- Network: USA Network
- Release: March 20, 1991

Murder 101 is a 1991 American mystery thriller television film directed by Bill Condon, who co-wrote it with Roy Johansen. The film stars Pierce Brosnan, Dey Young, Antoni Corone, Todd Merrill and Dianne Hull. It also stars Raphael Sbarge and Kathe Mazur. It aired on the USA Network on March 20, 1991.

== Plot ==
Charles Lattimore, an English professor played by Brosnan, gives his class an assignment to plot a murder, but after a student and someone else dies, he becomes the prime suspect in a murder investigation. Realizing that the theoretical murder plot has been used to set him up, he is faced with finding a way to foil the plan he helped create.

== Cast ==
- Pierce Brosnan as Charles Lattimore
- Dey Young as Laura Lattimore
- Kim Thomson as Francesca Lavin
- Antoni Corone as Mike Dowling
- Raphael Sbarge as Robert Miner
- J. Kenneth Campbell as Tim Ryder
- Yorgo Constantine as Jon Steinmetz
- Judy Prescott as Gail Gogerty
- Dianne Hull as Ellen Dowling
- Terry Markwell as Anne Ryder
- Bob Sweeney as Tilden Crane
- Mark L. Taylor as Henry Potter
- Barbara Allyne Bennet as Judge
- Jack Thibeau as Roadblock Officer
- Kathe Mazur as Linda Jo, Poet
- Todd Merrill as John Defazio
- Mary Lou Piccard as TV Reporter
- Janet Rotblatt as Millie
- Suzanne Stone as Defense Attorney
- Yavone Evans as Mary
- Tim Neeley as Deputy Sheriff

== Release ==
=== VHS ===
- Universal City, CA : MCA Universal Home Video (1992)

=== DVD ===
- Timeless Media Group (circa 2007)
- Goodtimes Home Video (© 2000)
