= Grimcutty =

2022 film by John Ross

- Poster
- Directed by: John Ross
- Written by: John Ross
- Produced by: David Brooks; Jenna Cavelle; Dawn Fanning Moore; David D. Moore; Arbi Pedrossian
- Starring: Sara Wolfkind; Shannyn Sossamon; Usman Ally; Callan Farris; Brenda Schmid; Joel Ezra Hebner; Kayden Alexander Koshelev; Tate Moore
- Cinematography: Bridger Nielson
- Edited by: Chester Howie
- Music by: Sara Barone
- Production companies: 20th Digital Studio; Capture
- Distributed by: Hulu (United States); Star+ (Latin America); Disney+ (International)
- Release date: October 10, 2022
- Country: United States
- Language: English

Grimcutty is a 2022 monster horror film written and directed by John Ross. The film stars Sara Wolfkind, Shannyn Sossamon, Usman Ally, and Callan Farris. It was produced by 20th Digital Studio and Capture. Grimcutty was released on Hulu in United States, on Star+ in Latin America, and on Disney+ internationally. The film generally received negative reviews from critics.

== Premise ==
A young teen works with her little brother to stop an internet meme that has come to life. The story was inspired by the Momo Challenge hoax, an internet moral panic that reached its peak in 2019.

== Cast ==
- Sara Wolfkind as Asha Chaudhry, Amir and Leah's daughter and Kamran's older sister. She is also the second victim of the Grimcutty.
- Shannyn Sossamon as Leah Chaudhry, Amir's wife and the mother of Asha and Kamran.
- Usman Ally as Amir Chaudhry, Leah's husband and the father of Asha and Kamran.
- Alona Tal as Melinda Jaynes, Brandon Jaynes' mother and the one who started the Grimcutty post.
- Tate Moore as Cassidy Johnston, the first and only commenter of Asha's latest video and the fourth victim of the Grimcutty. She knew about the Grimcutty before Asha and Kayla.
- Callan Farris as Kamran Chaudhry, Amir and Leah's son and Asha's little brother. He is also the third victim of the Grimcutty.
- Brenda Schmid as Tracy Johnston, Cassidy's mother.
- Scott Roberts as George Johnston, Cassidy's father.
- Kritian Flores as Jackson Martinez.
- Joel Hebner as Grimcutty.
- Kayden Alexander Koshelev as Brandon Jaynes, Melinda Jaynes' son and the first victim of the Grimcutty.
- John Ross Bowie (special appearance).
- Nanrisa Lee as Sarah Litman, Emily's mother.
- Jeff Meacha as David Litman, Emily's father.
- Kory Mann as Student 1 in the auditorium.
- Terry Dexter as Laura.
- Shelli Boone as Principal.
- Ryan P. Shrime as Dave Bagilardi.
- Justin Jarzombek as Oliver.
- Mia Pollini as one of the partygoers at Oliver's house.
- Chrisaane Eastwood as Fran.
- Clinton Lowe as Male Nurse.
- Tamara Whatley as Receptionist
- Olabisi Kovabel as Kayla "Kai".
- Malaya Valenzuela as Emily Litman, Sarah and David's daughter and Asha's best friend.

== Production ==
Production company Capture produced and 20th Digital Studio developed the film. Writer director John Ross got the idea for the film while watching a news story about the Momo Challenge hoax and took particular notice of the disconnect between the hysterical behavior of the parents interviewed versus the children who'd react to the interviewer with confusion having been unaware of "Momo". Ross had wanted to do an Invasion of the Body Snatchers-style horror film centered around technology and used the Momo hoax a foundation for the story.

== Release ==
The film released in United States on Hulu, on Star+ in Latin America, and on Disney+ as part of the Star content hub in other international territories, on October 10, 2022.

== Reception ==
On the review aggregator website Rotten Tomatoes, 22% of 9 critics' reviews are positive, with an average rating of 3.7/10.

Yael Tygiel of Collider included Grimcutty in their "Best Movies on Hulu Right Now" list, and described it as a "grizzly and terrifying movie." Mike Mack of Laughing Place called the film a "fine watch if you’re looking for something new," complimenting the story and the performances of the actors. Sean Shuman of MovieWeb asserted, "Grimcutty may not be a perfect movie, but it's an interesting encapsulation of just how quickly misinformation can wreak havoc, even if it's spread with good intentions." Johnny Loftus of Decider said, "It’s too long, and a character checking a phone or their email will never be as compelling to watch as Hollywood wants it to be. But Grimcutty has a strong cast in its favor, and derives some scary-adjacent chills from setting its main baddie loose to grimly grab at teens in trouble."

Matt Donato of Paste gave Grimcutty a grade of 5.5 out of 10, and said the film "works itself backward into a forgettable cyber-folktale fate." Shrija Ganguly of Sportskeeda stated that Grimcutty has "some good horror content," and complimented the performance of Usman Ally, but stated that the film has too many loopholes. Lindsay Traves of Pajiba asserted that the film is "born of an interesting idea," but said that the execution was "unfortunately boring." Kyle McWilliams of Mashable said that the "scares are overshadowed by over-explanation," writing, "If the movie trusted its audience more in collecting the thematic goods, there could be space to discover even deeper horrors within the depths of online culture. Instead, the spoon-feeding approach kills the thrills and the fun."

Joe Lipsett of Bloody Disgusting gave the film a grade of 2 out of 5 and complimented the performance of Sara Wolfkind, but called it a "messy film, complete with substantial logic gaps, more than one scenery-chewing performance, and a run time that isn’t earned by its relatively thin, repetitive script." Brian Costello of Common Sense Media gave Grimcutty a grade of 2 out of 5, said the presence of positive messages is almost non-existent, and noted the absence of positive role models across the characters. Loric C. of Ready Steady Cut gave Grimcutty a grade of 1.5 out of 5 and found the movie to be a "weak offering to the horror genre."
