= Clock (film) =

2023 film by Alexis Jacknow

- Official release poster
- Directed by: Alexis Jacknow
- Written by: Alexis Jacknow
- Produced by: Leal Naim
- Starring: Dianna Agron; Jay Ali; Melora Hardin; Saul Rubinek
- Cinematography: Martim Vian
- Edited by: Alexandra Amick
- Music by: Stephen Lukach
- Production company: 20th Digital Studio
- Distributed by: Hulu (United States); Disney+ (international)
- Release dates: March 31, 2023 (Overlook Film Festival); April 28, 2023 (United States)
- Running time: 91 minutes
- Country: United States
- Language: English

Clock is a 2023 American science fiction horror film written and directed by Alexis Jacknow in her feature-length debut, based on her 2020 short film of the same name. The film stars Dianna Agron. It was released on Hulu in the United States on April 28, 2023, and on Disney+ internationally.

== Plot ==
Ella Patel is 37 and uninterested in having kids despite pressure from friends and family. Her father, the grandchild of Holocaust survivors, urges her to reconsider. Her husband, Aiden, suggests that she visit a doctor, Dr. Webber, for breast cancer screening. At the doctor's, Ella explains her trepidations about childbirth and her wish that her biological clock would kick in. Dr. Webber says Ella's clock might be broken, then suggests an experimental treatment. Ella leaves to enroll in the study under the guise of working on an important work project, which she backs out of over the phone. She meets Dr. Elizabeth Simmons, who claims that she can fix Ella's clock with an implant and hormones. Ella begins taking the prescribed pills.

During a Rorschach test, Ella hallucinates a very tall woman, a family of dead bugs, and a grandfather clock. Dr. Simmons suggests that the clock represents Ella's fear of ending her family line and that she's ready for the next step in the treatment. In a sensory deprivation chamber designed to make her face her fears, Ella sees herself with a baby swinging from between her legs like a pendulum, as well as terrifying scenes of childbirth. She screams to be let out. When the chamber opens, she sees the tall woman standing at her tank, runs, but slips and hits her head. She passes out. When Ella awakes, Dr. Simmons tells her that a strong reaction to the treatment is a good sign. Ella watches the surveillance footage and sees that the person standing outside the tank was the attendant. Ella agrees to the last procedure, the insertion of the implant, and returns home.

Ella and Aiden attend a party at her pregnant friend Shauna's house. Ella hallucinates a spider again and attempts to smash Shauna's belly with a heavy book, but Aiden stops her. Shauna is unsettled, though still wants her to design her nursery. The side effects continue; Ella loses her colour vision, hears the ticking of a grandfather clock, and sees normal people as the tall woman. She keeps this from Dr. Simmons to avoid being pulled from the study. As she has an episode in Shauna's nursery, Shauna walks in and discovers that Ella has been "decorating" the room with horrors, painting the tall woman and other objects of her hallucinations and nailing jagged pieces of wood on the wall. The friends argue, and Shauna's water breaks. Ella smears the amniotic fluid on her own face and is thrown out of the house by Shauna's wife.

Ella is summoned to her dad's, as he has fallen and broken his arm. As he speaks, the ticking of the grandfather clock behind him grows louder. Ella grabs tools from the cupboards and attacks the clock amidst her father's protests. She tears it apart piece by piece, reveling in its destruction. Aiden finds Ella sitting at home in shock, with cuts on her hands. She explains what happened, and he consoles her. As he cleans her wounds, she tells him she's ready for a baby. They have sex and are immediately interrupted when the implant cuts Aiden's genitals. He asks her to grab gauze from his bag. Ella sees the treatment facility logo on the bag and confronts him. Aiden admits he met Dr. Simmons at a trade show and plotted to have Dr. Webber suggest the study to Ella. In a rage, Ella aggravates his injury and leaves.

Ella drives to the facility and confronts Dr. Simmons before other participants. They argue, and Ella asks for the implant to be removed. Dr. Simmons refuses. Ella begins to remove it with pliers and is stopped by the tall woman. When Ella knocks her down, the tall woman turns into Dr. Simmons. Ella rips the implant out of herself and is able to see colors again. Several police cars arrive; Ella flees by car. Stopped near the edge of a cliff, Ella answers a call from Aiden. He tells her that he called the cops after seeing what she did to her father. Ella is bewildered, then realises the clock she tore apart was actually her father. She leaves the car in despair and is handcuffed by the cops. She runs and jumps off the edge of the cliff. Ella is then shown lying by the edge of the water at the bottom of the cliff, with no visible injuries. She watches a strange fish-like creature crawl out of the water towards her.

== Cast ==
- Dianna Agron as Ella
- Melora Hardin as Dr. Elizabeth Simmons
- Jay Ali as Aidan
- Grace Porter as Shauna
- Saul Rubinek as Joseph
- Stefan Sims as Harvey

== Production ==
The film originated with a short film by Jacknow of the same name, with the feature length version commissioned in 2020 by 20th Digital Studio. The film has Leal Naim as producer with Alex Hansen co-producing. David Worthen Brooks, Arbi Pedrossian, and Jenna Cavelle are executive producers. According to Jacknow, the horror genre allowed her to get the film made: “It's just a really great genre for getting out message-based material. I got to talk about female body autonomy in a movie that's going to be on Hulu because it's a horror film." Dianna Agron was cast in the lead role.

== Release ==
Clock had its world premiere at the Overlook Film Festival in New Orleans on March 31, 2023. The film was released on April 28, 2023 on Hulu in the United States, and on Disney+ internationally.

== Reception ==
On the review aggregator website Rotten Tomatoes, 79% of 39 critics' reviews are positive, with an average rating of 6.2/10. The website's consensus reads: "While Clock may strain some viewers' suspension of disbelief, it's a mostly effective attempt to view reproductive pressures through a chilling horror lens." Metacritic, which uses a weighted average, assigned the film a score of 59 out of 100, based on seven critics, indicating "mixed or average" reviews.

James Croot of Stuff called Clock one of the most "disturbing, thought-provoking horrors conceived in a long time," complimented the film's approach on human nature, and praised the performance of Dianna Agron. Haleigh Foutch of Collider included Clock in their "Best Horror Movies on Hulu Right Now" list, describing it as a "meditation on the pressures women face around reproduction," saying, "The film has a lot to say about its themes and perfectly uses the thriller medium to manifest and physicalize the internal struggles that aging women deal with on a daily basis." Mary Beth McAndrews of Dread Central gave the film a grade of 3 out of 5 stars, writing, "Despite some third-act stumbles, Clock is a shocking experience supported by stunning performances from Dianna Agron and Melora Hardin."
