= Night Stalker (TV series) =

American TV series (2005–2006)

- Based on: Characters by Jeff Rice
- Developed by: Frank Spotnitz
- Starring: Stuart Townsend; Gabrielle Union; Eric Jungmann; Cotter Smith
- Theme music composer: Philip Glass
- Country of origin: United States
- Original language: English
- No. of seasons: 1
- No. of episodes: 10

Production
- Running time: 42 minutes
- Production companies: Big Light Productions; ABC Signature

Original release
- Network: ABC iTunes (episodes 6–12)
- Release: September 29, 2005 – March 17, 2006

Related
- Kolchak: The Night Stalker

Night Stalker is a television series that ran for six weeks in 2005 on ABC in the United States. The series starred Stuart Townsend as Carl Kolchak, an investigative reporter whose wife was murdered. Kolchak spends his time investigating other strange murders, believing they are linked in some way to his wife Irene's murder. He is helped along the way by a fellow crime reporter Perri Reed (Gabrielle Union), photographer Jain McManus (Eric Jungmann) and editor Anthony Vincenzo (Cotter Smith).

Night Stalker was a reboot of the 1974 series Kolchak: The Night Stalker, reimagining Carl Kolchak as a younger man obsessed with a personal tragedy. ABC owned the rights to the original television movies, but not the Universal television series, and was limited to using only characters that had appeared in those movies.

== Characters ==
=== Main ===
- Carl Kolchak (Stuart Townsend): The believer. Reporter for the L.A. Beacon newspaper; continuously searches for his wife Irene's murderer and supernatural happenings in Los Angeles.
- Perri Reed (Gabrielle Union): The skeptic. Head crime reporter for the L.A. Beacon, but she trails after Kolchak like a rookie. She helps Kolchak investigate his cases of the paranormal, although she looks for a normal explanation of the cases.
- Jain McManus (Eric Jungmann): Kolchak's open-minded friend. He is a photographer for the L.A. Beacon.
- Anthony Vincenzo (Cotter Smith): Editor of the L.A. Beacon. A friend of Kolchak's who hired him as a favor after they worked together in Las Vegas.

=== Recurring ===
- Agent Bernie Fain (John Pyper-Ferguson): Kolchak's former friend in Las Vegas but now a nemesis, an FBI agent who believed Kolchak murdered Irene and made up a bizarre story to cover up his involvement. The character is loosely reworked from Agent Bernie Jenks (Ralph Meeker), Kolchak's Vegas contact in the original Night Stalker TV movie.
- "Edhead" (Loreni Delgado): Technology specialist for the L.A. Beacon. Friend of Jain's.
- Alex Nyby (Eugene Byrd): Coroner's assistant at the Los Angeles Morgue. A contact of Kolchak's who drools over Perri.

=== Guest ===
- Damon Caylor (Tony Curran): A disfigured, blind Charles Manson-esque cult leader who uses supernatural powers to force the people who convicted him to kill their families.

== Episodes ==
No.	Title	Original release date	US viewers (millions)
1	"Pilot"	September 29, 2005	7.10
Carl Kolchak suspects a series of coyote-like attacks may be connected to his wife Irene's murder.
2	"The Five People You Meet in Hell"	October 6, 2005	5.90
Damon Caylor, an imprisoned cult leader forces the people who got him convicted to kill their families. Kolchak investigates, and discovers Perri Reed testified at his trial, and is going to be his next victim. Guest stars: Tony Curran, Art LaFleur, Alex Carter.
3	"Three"	October 13, 2005	5.10
A university club's secret initiation ritual may be the cause behind deaths which are somehow caused by fear.
4	"Burning Man"	October 20, 2005	4.50
A copycat killer of a deceased serial killer known as "The Burning Man" emerges, but Kolchak suspects that the copycat and the original killer are one and the same. Guest star: William Lucking.
5	"Malum"	October 27, 2005	5.00
Bizarre deaths are occurring around a school attended by Justin Seaver, a possibly abused child who may have a connection to the deaths. Guest stars: Tony Todd, Fredric Lehne, Paul Dillon.
6	"The Source"	November 10, 2005	3.90
Kolchak is being forced by the FBI to give up his unknown informant
7	"The Sea"	Unknown (on iTunes)	TBD
8	"Into Night"	February 7, 2006 (on iTunes)	N/A
9	"Timeless"	February 7, 2006 (on iTunes)	N/A
A woman named Jennifer Owen's death may be connected to old cases occurring every 35 years. Guest stars: Mira Furlan, Stephen Tobolowsky, Michael Fairman, Kevin Rahm.
10	"What's the Frequency, Kolchak"	February 7, 2006 (on iTunes)	N/A
Kolchak is kidnapped by Paul Krieger, a disturbed man who believes Kolchak has been communicating with him through his articles and that a mysterious entity is responsible for his actions. However, Krieger may hold the key to Irene's murder. Guest stars: Pat Healy, Reggie Lee.

== Broadcast ==
Night Stalker was developed by Frank Spotnitz, one of the main writers on The X-Files. His previous work included co-writing "Travelers", one of two episodes of The X-Files which guest-starred Darren McGavin, who played Carl Kolchak in the original Kolchak: The Night Stalker. The first episode of Night Stalker was broadcast on Thursday, September 29, at 9 p.m. against CSI: Crime Scene Investigation on CBS, The Apprentice on NBC and the 2005 MLB playoffs on Fox.

On November 13, 2005, Frank Spotnitz announced on his blog that Night Stalker had been canceled. ABC announced the official cancellation of the series that following Monday. Though ten episodes were produced, Night Stalker was canceled after only six episodes had aired.

The last episode to be broadcast was the first of a multi-part episode, so viewers never saw the end of the sixth story. However, some time after the cancellation, the seventh episode appeared on Apple's iTunes Music Store for download. On February 7, 2006, the final three episodes were released on iTunes. All ten filmed episodes were aired on the Sci-Fi Channel in the summer of 2006. In 2007, the show continued in rotation on the network's weekday series marathons.

Night Stalker has been re-run on the Chiller channel, beginning on November 3, 2007. In the UK the series aired in December 2007 and January 2008 on Bravo.

In Australia, the Seven Network free-to-air station and Prime in regional areas screened the series between early June and September 2007.

== Home media ==
Night Stalker: The Complete Series was released by Buena Vista Home Entertainment on May 30, 2006.

The set includes all ten episodes; commentary on the episodes "Pilot" and "The Source, Part Two"; deleted scenes; a featurette entitled "A Conversation with Frank Spotnitz"; and unproduced scripts in the DVD-ROM format.
