= Not Another Teen Movie =

2001 film by Joel Gallen

- Theatrical release poster
- Directed by: Joel Gallen
- Written by: Michael G. Bender; Adam Jay Epstein; Andrew Jacobson; Phil Beauman; Buddy Johnson
- Produced by: Neal H. Moritz
- Starring: Jaime Pressly; Mia Kirshner; Randy Quaid
- Cinematography: Reynaldo Villalobos
- Edited by: Steven Welch
- Music by: Theodore Shapiro
- Production companies: Columbia Pictures; Original Film
- Distributed by: Sony Pictures Releasing
- Release date: December 14, 2001
- Running time: 89 minutes
- Country: United States
- Language: English
- Budget: $15 million
- Box office: $66.5 million

Not Another Teen Movie is a 2001 American teen parody film directed by Joel Gallen and written by Mike Bender, Adam Jay Epstein, Andrew Jacobson, Phil Beauman, and Buddy Johnson. It features Chyler Leigh, Chris Evans, Jaime Pressly, Eric Christian Olsen, Eric Jungmann, Mia Kirshner, Deon Richmond, Cody McMains, Sam Huntington, Samm Levine, Cerina Vincent, Ron Lester, Randy Quaid, Lacey Chabert, Riley Smith and Samaire Armstrong.

Released on December 14, 2001, by Sony Pictures Releasing under its Columbia Pictures label, the film is a parody of teen films released during the 1980s and 90s. The general plot is primarily derived from She's All That, as well as 10 Things I Hate About You, Can't Hardly Wait, Pretty in Pink, and Varsity Blues. It is also filled with allusions to other films featuring teen and college-aged characters, such as American Beauty, American Pie, Bring It On, Can't Buy Me Love, Cruel Intentions, Dazed and Confused, Fast Times at Ridgemont High, Ferris Bueller's Day Off, Grease, Jawbreaker, Lucas, Never Been Kissed, Risky Business, Road Trip, Rudy, and Sixteen Candles, while Paul Gleason reprises his role as Vice Principal Vernon from The Breakfast Club.

Not Another Teen Movie received generally negative reviews from critics and grossed $66.5 million on a $15 million budget.

== Plot ==
In the stereotypical high school community of John Hughes High in Southern California, Priscilla, head cheerleader, separates from her football star/slacker boyfriend, Jake Wyler. Discovering she is now dating timid and weird Les to spite him, one of Jake's friends, Austin, makes a bet with him to turn nerdy Janey Briggs into the prom queen. Janey is not insecure enough to feel any need to change herself, nor does she feel anything for him at first, but that does not stop him from trying.

As Jake attempts to court Janey, he faces adversity from his own sister, Catherine, who is sexually attracted to him; Janey's unnoticed admirer and best friend, Ricky Lipman; and memories from his past football career. Catherine assists him by "drastically" altering Janey's appearance (removing her glasses and ponytail), instantly making her drop-dead gorgeous.

Meanwhile, Janey's younger brother, Mitch, and his friends Ox and Bruce, make a pact to lose their virginity by graduation. Mitch tries to impress his longtime crush, Amanda Becker, with a love letter.

As the prom draws near, Jake becomes known for failing to lead the football team to victory at last year's state championship game. Austin then tricks Jake into telling Janey about his bet to spite Priscilla, pretending to whisper the secret bet in Janey's ear, causing her to leave upset. On prom night, Austin and Janey go together; a jealous Jake and Catherine have a dance-off with Austin and Janey, with Catherine dancing sexually. Janey runs off crying.

Meanwhile, Mitch and his friends are having a lousy time until Amanda arrives and Mitch gives her the letter (to which she responds she does not have sex with every loser who does such, but gives them handjobs), Bruce hooks up with naked foreign exchange student Areola, and Ox hooks up with Catherine.

Jake is awarded prom king, and the votes for prom queen are tied. Everyone thinks that it is between Janey and Priscilla, but they are shocked when conjoined twins Kara and Sara Fratelli win prom queen. During the prom king and queen dance, Janey supposedly left with Austin to go to a hotel.

Jake goes to the hotel room where he finds Austin having sex with a girl but is shocked to find that it is Priscilla and not Janey, while Les videotapes them with his pants down. Austin tells Jake that Janey "ran home to her daddy." Jake punches Austin and Priscilla, knocking them unconscious for humiliating Janey. He then punches Les for "being really weird"; afterwards, he runs to Janey's, only to be told she is on her way to art school in Paris.

Jake confronts her before she boards the plane, but uses a plethora of clichéd lines from other films to convince her not to go. His final (and only original) speech suggests they would be better off separated, but Janey mistakenly believes he is quoting The Karate Kid, and she decides to stay with him.

In a mid-credits scene, Janey's father Mr. Briggs drunkenly assaults himself with pies in his kitchen. In a post-credits scene, a previously seen albino folk singer, an afroed student with a guitar, reveals that she has become blind and calls out for assistance upon completing her song, while an audience member calls for another to assist in stealing her guitar.

== Cast ==
Cast of Not Another Teen Movie
Actor	Character	Stereotype	Based on
Chyler Leigh	Janey Briggs	"The Pretty Ugly Girl"	Laney Boggs (Rachael Leigh Cook) from She's All That; Katerina Stratford (Julia Stiles) from 10 Things I Hate About You; Andie Walsh (Molly Ringwald) from Pretty in Pink
Chris Evans	Jake Wyler	"The Popular Jock"	Zack Siler (Freddie Prinze Jr.) from She's All That; Jake Ryan (Michael Schoeffling) from Sixteen Candles; Jonathan Moxon (James Van Der Beek) from Varsity Blues; Cappie Roew (Charlie Sheen) from Lucas; Patrick Verona (Heath Ledger) from 10 Things I Hate About You
Jaime Pressly	Priscilla	"The Nasty Cheerleader"	Taylor Vaughan (Jodi Lyn O'Keefe) from She's All That; Big Red (Lindsay Sloane) and Torrance (Kirsten Dunst) from Bring It On; Angela Hayes (Mena Suvari) from American Beauty
Eric Christian Olsen	Austin	"The Cocky Blond Guy"	Dean Sampson Jr. (Paul Walker) from She's All That; Steff McKee (James Spader) from Pretty in Pink
Mia Kirshner	Catherine Wyler	"The Cruelest Girl"	Kathryn Merteuil (Sarah Michelle Gellar) from Cruel Intentions; Mackenzie Siler (Anna Paquin) from She's All That
Deon Richmond	Malik Token	"The Token Black Guy"	Preston (Dulé Hill) from She's All That
Eric Jungmann	Ricky Lipman	"The Obsessed Best Friend"	Duckie Dale (Jon Cryer) from Pretty in Pink; Jesse Jackson (Elden Henson) from She's All That
Ron Lester	Reggie Ray	"The Stupid Fat Guy"	Billy Bob (Lester) from Varsity Blues
Cody McMains	Mitch Briggs	"The Desperate Virgin"	Kevin Myers (Thomas Ian Nicholas) from American Pie; Preston Meyers (Ethan Embry) from Can't Hardly Wait; Simon Boggs (Kieran Culkin) from She's All That; Brian Johnson (Anthony Michael Hall) and John Bender (Judd Nelson) from The Breakfast Club
Sam Huntington	Ox	"The Sensitive Guy"	Oz (Chris Klein) from American Pie; Andrew Clark (Emilio Estevez) from The Breakfast Club
Samm Levine	Bruce	"The Wannabe"	Daniel LaRusso (Ralph Macchio) from The Karate Kid; Jim Levenstein (Jason Biggs) from American Pie; Kenny Fisher (Seth Green) from Can't Hardly Wait
Lacey Chabert	Amanda Becker	"The Perfect Girl"	Amanda Beckett (Jennifer Love Hewitt) from Can't Hardly Wait
Heather Brown Dodge	Dainty Girl	"Peeping Tom Scene Gone Bad"	Beulah Balbricker (Nancy Parsons) from Porky's
Cerina Vincent	Areola	"The Foreign Exchange Student" and "Nudist"	Nadia (Shannon Elizabeth) from American Pie
Riley Smith	Les	"The Beautiful Weirdo"	Ricky Fitts (Wes Bentley) from American Beauty
Ean Mering	Marty	"The Wimpy Football Player"	Lucas Blye (Corey Haim) from Lucas; Rudy Ruettiger (Sean Astin) from Rudy
Julie Welch	Beverly Wyler	N/A	N/A
Samaire Armstrong	Kara Fratelli	N/A	N/A
Nectar Rose	Sara Fratelli	N/A	N/A
Ed Lauter	The Coach	"Win-at-all-cost Jerk Coach"	Coach Bud Kilmer (Jon Voight) from Varsity Blues; Coach Willis (Robert Patrick) from The Faculty
Randy Quaid	Mr. Briggs	"Dead Beat Alcoholic Father"	Russel Casse (Quaid) from Independence Day; Wayne Boggs (Kevin Pollak) from She's All That; Jack Walsh (Harry Dean Stanton) from Pretty in Pink
Joanna Garcia	Sandy Sue	"The New Girl in School"	Sandy Olsson (Olivia Newton-John) from Grease
Beverly Polcyn	Sadie Agatha Johnson	"The Undercover Journalist"	Josie Geller (Drew Barrymore) from Never Been Kissed; Cameron Crowe's undercover journalism working on Fast Times at Ridgemont High
Rob Benedict	Preston Wasserstein	N/A	Ferris Bueller (Matthew Broderick) from Ferris Bueller's Day Off; Joel Goodson (Tom Cruise) from Risky Business
Patrick St. Esprit	Austin's father	N/A	N/A
Josh Radnor	Tour Guide	N/A	Michael Eckman (David Krumholtz) from 10 Things I Hate About You; Barry Manilow (Tom Green) from Road Trip
Paul Goebel	"The Chef Who Ejaculated Into Mitch's French Toast"	N/A	French Toast Guy (Horatio Sanz) from Road Trip
George Wyner	Principal Cornish	"The Principal"	N/A
Jon Benjamin	Trainer	N/A	N/A

Many stars of teen films, as well as those from the 1980s, make credited and uncredited appearances. These include:

- Molly Ringwald as "The Rude, Hot Flight Attendant"; Ringwald starred in many '80s teen films, most significantly Pretty in Pink, Sixteen Candles and The Breakfast Club.
- Mr. T as "The Wise Janitor", a parody of Charles S. Dutton's character from Rudy; The A-Team's opening sequence music is playing at the end of his speech.
- Kyle Cease as "The Slow Clap Guy"; Cease himself played Bogey Lowenstein in 10 Things I Hate About You.
- Melissa Joan Hart (uncredited) as "Slow Clapper's Instructor"; Hart can also be seen in Can't Hardly Wait and Drive Me Crazy. The commentator at the football game praises Hart and Sabrina the Teenage Witch.
- Lyman Ward as Mr. Wyler, representing the "Out-of-touch Father" best represented by Noah Levenstein (Eugene Levy) in American Pie; Ward played Ferris Bueller's father in Ferris Bueller's Day Off.
- Paul Gleason as Richard "Dick" Vernon; Gleason reprises his role as Vernon from The Breakfast Club.
- Sean Patrick Thomas as "The Other Token Black Guy"; Thomas appeared in Can't Hardly Wait, Cruel Intentions and Save the Last Dance.
- Good Charlotte as the band playing at the prom.

== Parodies ==
- Grease (1978)
- Airplane! (1980)
- My Bodyguard (1980)
- Fast Times at Ridgemont High (1982)
- Porky's (1981)
- Risky Business (1983)
- The Karate Kid (1984)
- Repo Man (1984)
- Sixteen Candles (1984)
- Better Off Dead (1985)
- The Breakfast Club (1985)
- Just One of the Guys (1985)
- Vision Quest (1985)
- Ferris Bueller's Day Off (1986)
- Lucas (1986)
- Pretty in Pink (1986)
- Can't Buy Me Love (1987)
- Three O'Clock High (1987)
- License to Drive (1988)
- Heathers (1988)
- The Naked Gun: From the Files of Police Squad! (1988)
- Dazed and Confused (1993)
- Rudy (1993)
- Clueless (1995)
- Independence Day (1996)
- Can't Hardly Wait (1998)
- The Faculty (1998)
- Pleasantville (1998)
- 10 Things I Hate About You (1999)
- American Beauty (1999)
- American Pie (1999)
- Cruel Intentions (1999)
- Detroit Rock City (1999)
- Deuce Bigalow: Male Gigolo (1999)
- Drop Dead Gorgeous (1999)
- Election (1999)
- Jawbreaker (1999)
- Never Been Kissed (1999)
- She's All That (1999)
- Superstar (1999)
- Varsity Blues (1999)
- Almost Famous (2000)
- Bring It On (2000)
- Dude, Where's My Car? (2000)
- Road Trip (2000)
- Unbreakable (2000)
- Save the Last Dance (2001)
- Summer Catch (2001)

== Music ==
The film's score is composed by Theodore Shapiro and consists largely of contemporary covers of 1980s pop and new wave hits. The musical number, "Prom Tonight", written by Ben Folds, Michael G. Bender, Adam Jay Epstein and Andrew Jacobson, is a parody of Grease. The song was never released commercially.

A soundtrack was released by Maverick Records on December 4, 2001. A cover of a-ha's "Take On Me" by the band Lifer was recorded but went unreleased.

A karaoke version of the ending to "Can't Fight this Feeling" by REO Speedwagon is used each time Amanda Becker enters a scene.

Not Another Teen Movie: Music from the Motion Picture

Soundtrack album by Various artists
- Released: December 4, 2001
- Genres: Rock, punk rock, heavy metal
- Length: 41:59
- Label: Maverick
- Producer: Various

Singles from Not Another Teen Movie: Music from the Motion Picture
- 1. "Tainted Love" Released: November 2001

No.	Title	Writer(s)	Artist	Length
1.	"Tainted Love" (originally by Gloria Jones)	Ed Cobb	Marilyn Manson	3:21
2.	"Never Let Me Down Again" (originally by Depeche Mode)	Martin Gore	The Smashing Pumpkins	4:00
3.	"Blue Monday" (originally by New Order)	Gillian Gilbert, Peter Hook, Stephen Morris, Bernard Sumner	Orgy	4:26
4.	"The Metro" (originally by Berlin)	John Crawford	System of a Down	2:59
5.	"But Not Tonight" (originally by Depeche Mode)	Martin Gore	Scott Weiland	4:50
6.	"Message of Love" (originally by The Pretenders)	Chrissie Hynde	Saliva	3:48
7.	"Bizarre Love Triangle" (originally by New Order)	Gillian Gilbert, Peter Hook, Stephen Morris, Bernard Sumner	Stabbing Westward	3:43
8.	"99 Red Balloons" (originally by Nena)	Jörn-Uwe Fahrenkrog-Petersen, Kevin McAlea	Goldfinger	3:50
9.	"I Melt with You" (originally by Modern English)	Robbie Grey, Gary McDowell, Richard Brown, Michael Conroy, Stephen Walker	Mest	3:19
10.	"If You Leave" (originally by Orchestral Manoeuvres in the Dark)	Andy McCluskey, Paul Humphreys, Martin Cooper	Good Charlotte	2:45
11.	"Please, Please, Please, Let Me Get What I Want" (originally by The Smiths)	Steven Morrissey, Johnny Marr	Muse	1:58
12.	"Somebody's Baby" (originally by Jackson Browne)	Jackson Browne, Danny Kortchmar	Phantom Planet	2:52

Songs not included on the soundtrack include "Line Up" by Elastica, "In Between Days" and "Turning Japanese" by Face to Face, "Lucy", "Don't You Forget About Me", "Everybody Knows Everything" and "Friends" by Sprung Monkey, "Yoo Hoo" by Imperial Teen, "Double Dare Ya" by Bikini Kill, "Rock Star" by Everclear, "Oh Yeah" by Yello, "Kiss Me" by Sixpence None the Richer, "Let's Go" by the Cars, "Pacific Coast Party" by Smash Mouth, "Let's Begin (Shoot the Shit)" by Bad Ronald, "True" and "King of Yesterday" by Jude, "900 Number" by The 45 King, "My Hero" by Foo Fighters, "I Want Candy", "Put Your Head on My Shoulder" and "Footloose" by Good Charlotte, "Space Age Love Song" by No Motiv, and "If You Were Here" by Thompson Twins.

== Release ==
Not Another Teen Movie opened theatrically on December 14, 2001. It was released on region 1 DVD on April 30, 2002, with an "unrated extended version" on July 26, 2005. This cut runs ten minutes longer than the original, and adds a number of deleted, alternate and extended scenes.

It was released on Blu-ray on November 1, 2016.

=== Box office ===
The film opened at third place at the US box office taking $12.6 million in its opening weekend. It grossed $38.3 million domestically and $28.2 million internationally, for a worldwide total of $66.5 million.

=== Critical response ===
The film received generally negative reviews from critics. Based on 102 reviews, it holds an approval rating of 32% on review aggregator Rotten Tomatoes, with an average rating of 4/10. The site's critics consensus states: "NATM has some funny moments, but the movie requires the audience to have familiarity with the movies being spoofed and a tolerance for toilet and sexual humor to be truly effective." Metacritic gave the film a weighted average score of 32 out of 100 based on 22 critics, indicating "generally unfavorable reviews". Audiences polled by CinemaScore gave the film an average grade of "C+" on an A+ to F scale.

Roger Ebert of the Chicago Sun-Times gave the film two stars out of a possible four, and admitted to laughing a few times but not as much as he did for American Pie or Scary Movie. Ebert also criticized the scatological humor. He urged audiences to not waste their time on the film, when in the month of December 2001 there were "21 other promising films" to choose from.

Robin Rauzi of the Los Angeles Times called it "a 90-minute exercise in redefining the word 'gratuitous'" and suggested it is most likely to appeal to fourteen-year-olds – "who of course [are] not supposed to be seeing this R-rated movie". Dennis Harvey of Variety criticized the film for its "overall tendency to mistake mere bad taste for outrageousness, and plain referentiality for satire" but praised Evans, Pressly, and Olsen for giving performances better than the material. He noted that the film follows the model of Scary Movie but lacked the comic finesse of Anna Faris.

Mick LaSalle of the San Francisco Chronicle called the film "a crass act" and pointed out the futility of trying to parody films that are already absurd. LaSalle complained that the film too closely copies She's All That, calling it "pathetic" that Not Another Teen Movie is just another formulaic teen movie.

== See also ==
- Spoof film
