= Mark Hapka =

American film and television actor (born 1982)

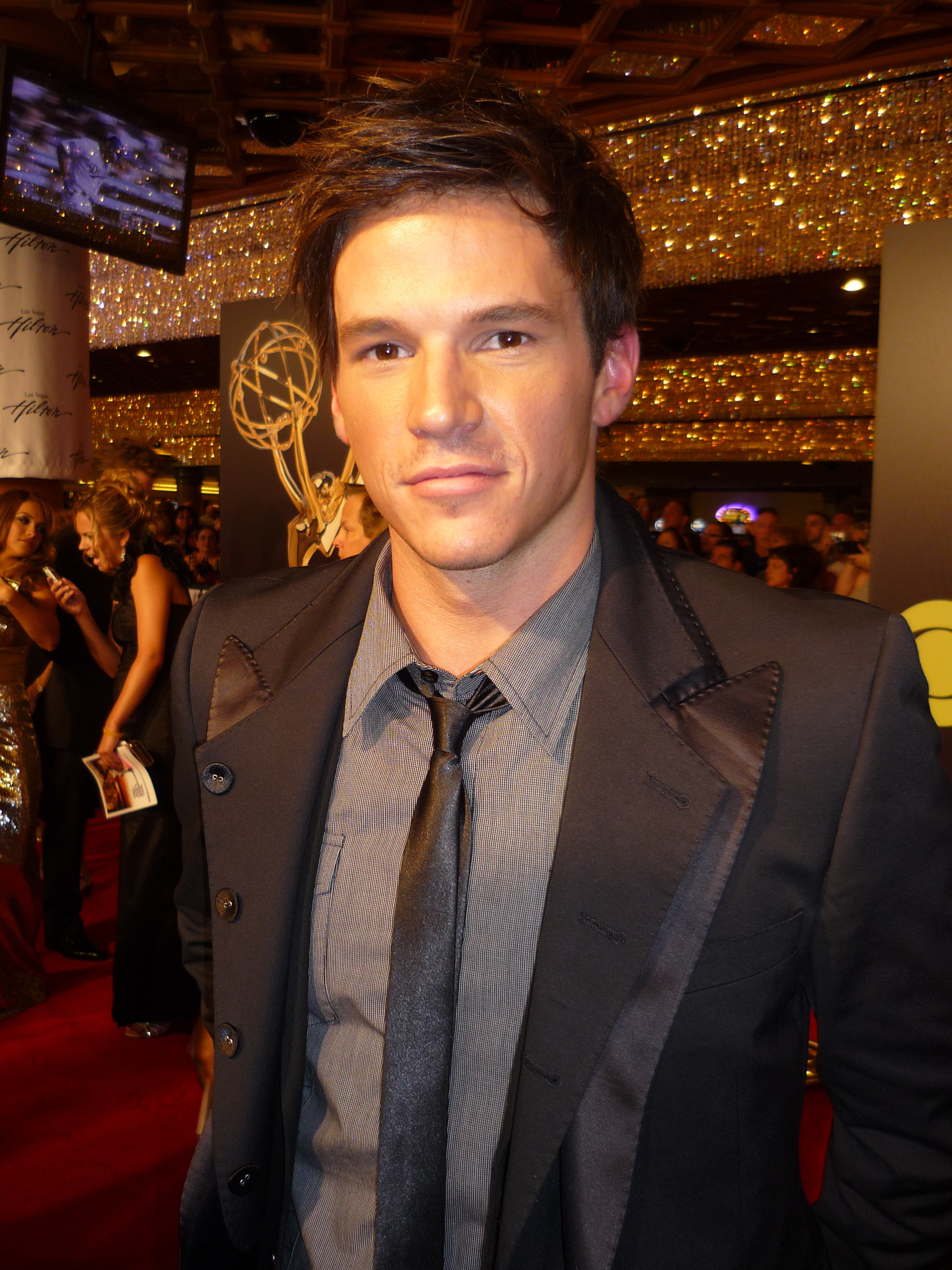
- Born: May 29, 1982 (age 44); Buffalo, New York, U.S.
- Other name: Marc Hapka
- Occupation: Actor
- Years active: 2007–present

Mark Hapka (born May 29, 1982) is an American film and television actor who first gained attention for portraying the lead role of the spirit 'Zach' on the Ghost Whisperer spin-off Ghost Whisperer: The Other Side. Hapka is most notable for his previous role as Nathan Horton on the NBC soap opera Days of Our Lives.

== Background ==
Mark Hapka was born on May 29, 1982, in Buffalo, New York, to Robert and Debbie Hapka. (His parents have since divorced and both are remarried.) When Hapka was about 11 years old, his family moved to Rome, New York. He is a 2000 graduate of Rome Free Academy, and then went on to study music education and voice at Onondaga Community College in Syracuse, New York. In 2005, Hapka left Syracuse and moved to Los Angeles, California. He enrolled in acting classes at Playhouse West and worked in student films, before appearing in a 2006 showcase that won him representation.

His surname is of Czech origin.

== Career ==
Hapka had his first credited role in James Franco's 2007 feature film Good Time Max, but is best known for his starring role as the spirit 'Zach' in 2007 and 2008 in the television series Ghost Whisperer: The Other Side and Ghost Whisperer. He won the role when producers Kim Moses and Ian Sander chose him as a 'fresh face' with an 'It Guy' quality. Following this, he appeared in the television series Greek and had a minor role on Days of Our Lives as an older Johnny DiMera. In 2009, he appeared in the films Second Sight and Midgets Vs. Mascots. Also in 2009, he had a recurring role in the television series Hannah Montana and also appeared on Cold Case. In June 2009, Hapka returned to Days of Our Lives when he was cast in the contract role of Nathan Horton. Soap Opera Digest reported on January 7, 2011, that he was let go from the show. Hapka has starring roles in the upcoming films The Danny McKay Project, where he portrays the title character Danny McKay, and Beyond the Mat.

== Filmography ==
- Good Time Max (2007)
- Current TV (2007)
- Ghost Whisperer (2007–2008), 2 episodes: "The Gathering", "Deadbeat Dads"
- Ghost Whisperer: The Other Side (16 episodes, 2007–2008)
- Days of Our Lives (2 episodes, 2007–2008) as Johnny DiMera
- Real Fiction (2008)
- Private High Musical (2008)
- Greek (2008), Episode: "A Tale of Two Parties"
- The Danny McKay Project (2009)
- Midgets Vs. Mascots (2009)
- Cold Case (2009), Episode: "Jackals"
- Hannah Montana (1 episode, 2009)
- Second Sight (2009)
- Days of Our Lives (2009–2011) as Nathan Horton
- Beyond the Mat - The Movie (2011)
- 23 Blast (2013)
- Altergeist (2014)
- Deadly Revenge (2014)
- Parallels (2015)
- Hot Take: The Depp/Heard Trial (2022) as Johnny Depp
