= Christopher Leone =

American filmmaker

- Occupations: Filmmaker; screenwriter; visual effects artist
- Years active: 1999–present
- Spouse: Pamela Wimberly (m. 2004)
- Website: www.christopherleone.com

Christopher Leone is an American filmmaker based in France with a background in visual effects and animation.

== Biography ==
Leone directed and co-wrote the film Code 3, starting Rainn Wilson and Lil Rel Howery, which hit theaters to strong reviews in September 2025 and released on Hulu in January 2026. Code 3 is a comedic, suspenseful, and heartbreaking look at a paramedic’s last day on the job. Leone developed and wrote the script with Patrick Pianezza, a real paramedic.

Leone wrote and directed the science-fiction digital pilot Parallels released by Fox Digital Studio on the Netflix streaming service in March 2015. Before that Leone directed two seasons of the digital series Suit Up and one season of Wolfpack of Reseda, also for Fox Digital.

Leone co-wrote and co-executive produced The Lost Room, a mini-series for Syfy produced by Lionsgate Television, starring Peter Krause, Julianna Margulies, and Kevin Pollak. The Lost Room was created by Leone, Laura Harkcom, and Paul Workman and first aired in December 2006. Leone, Harkcom, and Workman were nominated for a Writers Guild Award in 2008.

In 2006, Leone's short film K-7 screened at over 60 film festivals, including the Tribeca Film Festival and SXSW, and won 12 awards including Best Live Action Short at HBO's U.S. Comedy Arts Festival in Aspen, Best Short at CineVegas, and a Jury Mention at the Clermont-Ferrand International Short Film Festival.

In July 2009, Red 5 Comics published We Kill Monsters, written by Leone.

== Filmography ==
=== Film ===
Title	Year	Credited as				Notes	Ref(s)
Title	Year	Director	Writer	Producer	Other	Notes	Ref(s)
To Build a Better Mousetrap	1999	Yes	Yes	No	Yes	Editor; Short film	
Re: Stinky Boss	2002	Yes	Yes	No	Yes	Editor; Short film	
K-7	2006	Yes	Yes	Yes	Yes	Editor; Short film	
Parallels	2015	Yes	Yes	No	Yes	Executive producer	
The Replacement	2017	Yes	No	No	No	Short film	
Scaring Grandma	2018	Yes	No	No	No	Short film	
Code 3	2025	Yes	Yes	No	No		

=== Television ===
Title	Year(s)	Role	Channel	Notes	Ref(s)
The Lost Room	2006	—	Sci Fi Channel	Television miniseries (executive producer and writer)	
Bar Karma	2011	—	Current TV	"Hack Job" (director and writer); "Man Walks Out of a Bar" (director)	
Wolfpack of Reseda	2012	—	Fox Digital Studio	8 episodes (director)	
Suit Up	2012-2013	—	Fox Digital Studio	16 episodes (director)	
Gone: A Wayward Pines Story	2015	—	Fox Digital Studio	10 episodes (director and writer)	
