= Gregory J. Barnett =

American film director

Gregory J. Barnett is a stuntman, actor, second unit director and assistant director.

== Stuntman ==
His stunt work includes, The Fifth Floor Grease, The Guardian As stunt coordinator he worked on Lime Street in 1986, Designing Women in 1990, The Butcher's Wife in 1991 and the television series Castle that starred Nathan Fillion as Richard Castle, a mystery-thriller writer who assists the NYPD in investigating murders.

1986. the television serves Airwolf gained a Stuntman Association of Motion Picture Award for his work on the Annie Oakley. The award was for "Most spectacular sequence.

For his work as stunt coordinator for the series 24, the show received a Primetime Emmy Awards for Outstanding Stunt Coordination.

== Actor ==
He played the part of Sergeant Williger in The Ultimate Impostor, a 1979 science fiction / espionage film directed by Paul Stanley that starred Keith Andes, Macon McCalman, Erin Gray and Rosalind Chao. In 1984, he played the part of Andre in the series Hawaiian Heat that starred Robert Ginty and Jeff McCracken.

In recurring acting roles he has had an ongoing role in the television series Baywatch playing the part of Jim Barnett and in that role he appeared in more than thirty episodes. Another recurring role he had was that of Jesper Isberg on the TV series 24.

== Filmography (selective) ==
=== Actor ===
- The Guardian (2006)
- Midnight Ride (1992) ... Ca Highway Police
- Switch (1991) ... Thug At Duke'S
- They Live (1988) ... 1st Security Guard
- The Ultimate Imposter (1979) ... Sergeant Williger
- Samurai (1979) ... Colfax
- The Fifth Floor (1978) ... Deputy Sheriff
- The Bionic Woman Episode: Deadly Music (1978) ... Steve
- Exoman (1977)

=== Second Unit Director or Assistant Director ===
- Baywatch Hawaiian Wedding (2003)
- Assault on Devil's Island (1997)
- Protect and Surf a.k.a. Monstor Manor (1989)

=== Stunts ===
- Captain America: The Winter Soldier (2014)
- The Lone Ranger (2013)
- What to Expect When You're Expecting (2012)
- American Reunion (2012)
- Seven Psychopaths (2012)
- Soul Surfer (2011)
- Due Date (2010)
- The Stepfather (2009)
- The Invasion (2007)
- 1408 (2007)
- Live Free or Die Hard (2007)
- Flags of Our Fathers (2006)
- The Guardian (2006)
- Predator (1987)
