= The Lost Room =

2006 American science fiction television miniseries

- The Lost Room's DVD cover
- Genre: Supernatural; Drama; Mystery
- Created by: Christopher Leone; Laura Harkcom
- Starring: Peter Krause; Julianna Margulies; Peter Jacobson; Dennis Christopher; April Grace; Chris Bauer; Elle Fanning; Roger Bart; Kevin Pollak
- Country of origin: United States
- Original language: English
- No. of episodes: 3

Production
- Producers: Richard Hatem; Christopher Leone; Laura Harkcom; Paul Workman; Peter Chomsky; Bill Hill; Paul Kurta
- Running time: 90 minutes

Original release
- Network: Syfy Channel
- Release: December 11 – December 13, 2006

The Lost Room is a 2006 supernatural television miniseries created by Christopher Leone and Laura Harkcom that aired on the Syfy Channel in the United States. The series revolves around the titular room and some of the everyday items from that room which possess unusual powers. The show's protagonist, Joe Miller, is searching for these objects to rescue his daughter, Anna, who has disappeared inside the Room. Once a typical room at a 1960s motel along U.S. Route 66, the Lost Room has existed outside normal time and space since 4 May 1961, when what is referred to only as "the Event" took place.

== Cast and characters ==
- Peter Krause as Detective Joe Miller – A Pittsburgh detective who stumbles upon the existence of the Room. When his daughter becomes lost inside the Room, Joe sets out to get her back by using the Key to track down other Objects.
- Elle Fanning as Anna Miller – Joe's 8-year-old daughter. Her disappearance is seen by others as a probable family abduction by Joe in an ongoing child custody battle with his (unseen) ex-wife, Vanessa.
- Chris Bauer as Detective Lou Destefano – Joe's partner, whose murder in the story is blamed on Joe.
- April Grace as Detective Lee Bridgewater – Joe's friend at the police department. She is trying to clear Joe's name, and in so doing slowly discovers the powers held by the Room and its Objects.
- Dennis Christopher as Dr. Martin Ruber – A forensic scientist who works with Joe and who becomes obsessed with the Objects, going as far as killing in an attempt to get the Key. Through his obsession, he learns of and joins the Order of the Reunification, a cabal that believes the Objects are pieces of God and will allow direct communication with God if reunited as they were at the time of the Event. By the end of the series, Ruber believes he has become the Prophet of the Objects after having a vision while staring at the Polaroid Object.
- Julianna Margulies as Jennifer Bloom – A member of the Legion, another cabal dedicated to finding all of the Objects and hiding them for the protection of humanity. Jennifer tries to warn Joe of the inherent danger of the Room and the Objects therein. Her brother, Drew, became obsessed with the Objects, and Jennifer believes that something in Room 9 of the Motel "destroyed" him.
- Kevin Pollak as Karl Kreutzfeld – A former member of the Legion and collector of Objects. He owns a chain of dry-cleaning stores and several pawnshops that he uses to acquire Objects. Kreutzfeld claims to be searching for the Glass Eye to cure his son Isaac's leukemia. Alternately an ally and an enemy to Joe.
- Peter Jacobson as Wally Jabrowski – A man who has the Bus Ticket and is effectively a drifter. He has extensive knowledge about the Objects and their history.
- Ewen Bremner as Harold Stritzke – A voyeur who inherited the Comb from his aunt Barbara, a member of the Collectors. He has become very paranoid after being pursued by the Order and others who want his Object for themselves.
- Roger Bart as Howard "The Weasel" Montague – A former philosophy professor turned small-time criminal. He's an obsessed collector of Objects who charts the Objects' relations to one another and introduces the idea of the Prime Object.
- Chris McCarty as Milton Vrang – A former member of a Cabal and only living burn victim of the Pen. He provides valuable and secret information to Dr. Martin Ruber on the mysterious and dangerous world of Objects and Object Seekers.
- Margaret Cho as Suzie Kang – A tough, chain-smoking, independent operator who works as an Object tracker, selling information about the locations of the Room's Objects. She never touches them, as she recognizes the dangers that the Objects carry. Suzie runs her Object-tracking business out of the back of her mother's dry-cleaning business. She charges a fortune for the information.
- Jason Antoon as The Sood – A seedy, Las Vegas-based dealer of Object "Science" – pictures, videos, and artifacts relating to Objects – but never Objects themselves.
- Jason Douglas as Anthony – The intimidating bodyguard, hitman, and head of Kreutzfeld's personal Secret Service-style security team.
- Hugo Perez as Pumeet – The Sood's ubiquitous manservant and bodyguard.
- Tim Guinee as The Occupant, formerly Eddie McCleister – The Occupant was removed from time and space during The Event that made the Lost Room, leaving only his personal belongings as "Objects". Eddie no longer exists in time and there is no memory of his ever doing so, as even his wife has no recollection of him. He resides in a sanitarium under the name "John Doe" until found by Joe. Like the objects, he does not age, and cannot be damaged (hurt) in any way, so he himself is essentially one of the objects.
- Jorge Pallo as Ignacio "Iggy" Loca – Survivor of the pawn shop murders, temporarily holder of the Key, hands it to Detective Miller when dying.
- Lois Geary as Mabel Smith McCleister – the Occupant's wife, who 45 years later has no recollection of ever being married (even though she appears in the Wedding Photo, on the back of which, in Mabel's writing, are the words Summer 1959)

== Plot ==
=== The Room ===
The Room is the now nonexistent Room 10 at the abandoned Sunshine Motel outside Gallup, New Mexico. At 1:20:44 p.m. on May 4, 1961, something happened at the site of the Room that erased it and all its contents. This is referred to as "the Event" or "the Incident", and is thought to be the reason for the unusual properties of the Room and the Objects from within it. At the time of the Event, the motel was in serviceable condition, but after the event nobody remembers that a tenth room ever existed. One of the Objects, the undeveloped Polaroid picture, allows a person to view the tenth room as it was at the time of the Event by standing at its now vacant location at the Sunshine Motel ruins.

The Room can be accessed only by the person who has the Key. The Key will open any hinged door with a pin tumbler lock anywhere in the world, turning that door into a portal accessing the Room regardless of where it would normally open into. As Joe Miller sees on the surveillance tape, when a door is opened using the key, it appears closed if viewed from the other side of that door. When exiting the Room, its door opens not necessarily to the original place of entry, but to any room the holder of the Key has in mind, or to a random room if the user does not focus. To reach a specific room the user must have a clear picture of the room's door and the area around it. The "Lost" Room thus serves as a means of instant travel between similar doors anywhere on Earth. Hinged doors with types of locks other than a tumbler lock or with no lock at all, sliding doors and rotating doors cannot be used to access the Room. The door used does not have to be installed in a wall and can be a smaller prop door or a freestanding doorway; the only important elements are the lock and that it be a hinged door.

Any time the door is closed with the key outside the room, the Room "resets": everything that is not an Object disappears, including people. Multiple people can enter the room at once, but they must exit the room when the Key does. When the Room resets, any Objects in the Room will return to their original position at the time of the Event. A benefit of this is that an Object enclosed within something else, such as a safe, may be retrieved by leaving it inside and resetting the room. This can also be used to distinguish real Objects from fakes, since fakes will disappear.

Objects, when outside the Room, possess special powers and are indestructible. When inside the Room, Objects lose their special properties and can be destroyed. According to the Occupant, a new Object will take the destroyed Object's place, a phenomenon he refers to as the Law of Conservation of Objects. The Occupant states that there are many Rooms, and so any non-Object left in the Room is not erased, but exists in a different instance of the Room. The reset, in turn, represents a confluence of these Rooms, allowing the Occupant (the only Object with consciousness) to retrieve things lost during a reset, provided he has a clear idea of what he wishes to retrieve.

=== The Event ===
The Event is a shorthand term given to the moment in time that the Lost Room was created. It occurred at 1:20:44 p.m. on May 4, 1961, and erased the room and all of its contents from history. The reason behind this and the ultimate purpose of the Objects is unknown, though two primary hypotheses have been postulated. Even the man occupying the room at the time of the event doesn't seem to know what happened, so the truth remains a mystery. Both hypotheses essentially lead to the same conclusion, but attribute the event to different causes.

One faction, the Order of the Reunification, operates under the belief that the Objects are pieces of God's mind or body, and that reuniting them will allow them to communicate with God. More extreme versions of this view hold that reuniting the Objects will turn one into God or at least give that person God-like powers. Martin Ruber purports that the Occupant confirmed this particular theory for him in a vision, making him the self-proclaimed "Prophet of the Objects", but his near-death state from dehydration and heat exhaustion at the time casts doubt on his claims. Additionally, the Occupant himself shows no knowledge of the circumstances behind the event. The Deck of Cards, which gives one who is exposed to it a vision of the events during the Collectors' failed attempt to use the objects on Room 9 of the hotel, may be the source of their beliefs, as it is used in their rituals.

Another (though not necessarily contradictory) view of the phenomenon suggests that reality was somehow shattered at the location of the Room, thus separating it and everything in it from time and giving its contents metaphysical abilities. Should the items be collected and returned to the room by an individual, that person would then have complete control over reality. This theory works under the assumption that the one gathering the objects has the knowledge to utilize them properly. Since the Objects are just considered tools, they would do no good if the user were unaware of their paranormal functions.

=== The Objects ===
The Objects are powerful artifacts and consist of roughly 100 everyday items one would expect to find in an occupied motel room in the 1960s, including toiletries, items of clothing, personal effects, papers, amongst others. They are indestructible (except when inside the Room) and possess various other-worldly powers when taken outside the Lost Room, but do not work within the Room itself. According to Eddie McCleister (the Occupant – the human Object), if someone destroys an Object within the room, a similar Object takes its place, specifically asking Joe Miller to kill him (and free him from his never-ending life) and become the replacement Occupant. Whether the new object takes the former's properties partially or totally is unknown.

Various characters repeatedly put forth the opinion that, over time, Objects lead to something akin to bad karma or bad luck for their owners. All of the items (including the Occupant) attract one another, wanting to come together. The Occupant / McCleister states that the Objects are aware of each other, constantly sending out pings to each other and that for a living mind this is torture; the Occupant was eventually found when a search of the recorded history of other Objects revealed a small circular area where the Objects had never been detected, representing the area where the Occupant had resided for years.

Powers of Active Objects:

- Key — opens any hinged door that has a lock and turns that door into a portal to the Lost Room
- Pen — microwaves living things and short-circuits electronics
- Nail File — induces a brief but deep sleep when light reflects off its surface into someone's eyes
- Bus Ticket — transports any person who touches it to the middle of the road of Route 66, near the Sunshine Motel
- Pencil — creates pennies; can drive wealth-seekers insane; each penny is dated 1961, the same year that the Event occurred
- Umbrella — causes others to perceive the user as someone familiar
- Wristwatch — hard-boils an egg; the hands are frozen at 1:20 (the time of the Event)
- Radio — makes the user three inches taller if tuned to the right station
- Comb — stops time in the world for ten seconds, for everyone except the user
- Glasses — inhibits some types of combustion within a 20-foot radius, extinguishes fires, and prevents guns from firing
- Deck of Cards — induces violent visions relating to the Sunshine Motel, the Event, or the Conroy Experiment; can be used to temporarily incapacitate people
- Polaroid — when viewed in the proper orientation at the Sunshine Motel, allows the user to see the Lost Room as it was before the Event. Joe sees the Occupant; Ruber has a vision (or hallucination) of the Room, which he has never seen in person
- Watch Box — prevents things from decaying by dampening entropy for 10 meters
- Scissors — rotate a target, including a person, in three dimensions
- Flask — can suffocate a targeted person by unscrewing the cap
- Clock — sublimates brass, turning it directly from a solid to a gas
- Cufflink — lowers blood pressure of wearer
- Quarter — temporarily brings the holder's desired memories of a person to life and gives them solid form
- Glass Eye — heals or destroys living things
- The Occupant — Eddie McCleister, the Prime Object – though he denies being Prime, saying that he is simply the only sentient Object

————

- Knife + Watch = create "a kind of telepathy," Wally says
- Key + Comb + Watch Box = Access to an alternative version of Room 9; Joe uses them to euthanize Arlene Conroy after her torment in Room 9
- Nail Clippers + Pack of Cigarettes + Ashtray + Clock + Key + Toothbrush + Watch Box = "Something Very Bad" These were the Objects used in the 1966 Conroy Experiment, inadvertently opening a "tear in reality" and killing some Collectors. Kreutzfeld puts them together to try to recreate the experiment, "setting into motion a chain of events that could cataclysmically end the world as we know it."

=== The Cabals ===
Many Object-seekers have organized themselves into groups, known as "cabals." Wars between cabals are mentioned in the series, such as Collector John Clark being killed in 1971 during the First Cabal War. (Note: As stated by the Sood (Jason Antoon), to Karl Kreutzfeld (Kevin Pollak), in "The Eye and the Prime Object" (episode 3, 13 December 2006))

There are at least three cabals:

The Collectors
The original group of Object-seekers formed within a few years of the 1961 Event. Led by Arlene Conroy, the manager of the Sunshine Motel, most of the Collectors were killed or driven insane after the disaster in Room 9 in 1966. The survivors hid their most important Objects in a place called "The Collectors' Vault", buried in a fallout shelter beneath an abandoned prison.
The Legion
A cabal dedicated to collecting the Objects and stopping them from causing more harm. They claim to follow an established set of rules, including that they never kill in order to acquire the Objects, although this rule is sometimes put to the test.
The Order of the Reunification
Also referred to as "The Order" or "The New Religion." They believe that the Objects are pieces of God and must be reunited. Once so restored, members of the Order would be able to communicate with God for the first time in human history. Unlike the Legion, members of The Order have no qualms about killing.

== Production ==
=== Background ===
The website Television Heaven explains the genesis:

[T]he series came about from a combination of two ideas that Leone had been sitting on for years. One was a joke pitch involving weirdly specific superpowers, [with] which he and his colleague Paul Workman had played around. The most intriguing of their spitballed superpowers was the ability to teleport in and out of a hotel room. "Paul's idea was that if he had the power to teleport into a hotel room, that would be life-changing," said Leone in a 2016 interview... This became combined with Leone's mothballed movie pitch, about someone who gets a glass eye with magical powers, and becomes drawn into an underground war over it. He and Harkcom, while searching for a concept to spin into a series for the Sci-Fi Channel (latterly SyFy), took these ideas and mixed them together. The specific superpowers became, instead, attached to individual objects, allowing people to trade, buy or steal them, thus creating the underground war that had previously hinged on the glass eye (which, indeed, became one of the Objects in the series). The hotel room remained central to the story.

== Episodes ==
No.	Title	Directed by	Written by	Original release date
1	"The Key and the Clock"	Craig R. Baxley	Story by : Christopher Leone & Paul Workman; Teleplay by : Christopher Leone & Laura Harkcom	December 11, 2006
When investigating a murder, Detective Joe Miller learns about the Key and the other Objects, and becomes caught up in the Quest for the mythical 'Prime Object' when his daughter is lost in the Room. Objects which appear or are mentioned: Key, Pen, Nail File, Bus Ticket; Pencil; Umbrella; Wristwatch; Radio; Toothbrush.
2	"The Comb and the Box"	Michael W. Watkins	Christopher Leone & Laura Harkcom	December 12, 2006
Seeking the Prime Object, Joe joins forces with Karl Kreutzfeld and Jennifer Bloom to try and track down the Objects, while his former colleague, Doctor Martin Ruber, becomes increasingly obsessed with the Objects. Objects which appear or are mentioned: Comb; Glasses; Matchbook; Camera; Deck of Cards; Postcard; Razor; Shoehorn; Shot Glass; Slide Rule; Suitcase; Watch Box
3	"The Eye and the Prime Object"	Craig R. Baxley	Christopher Leone & Laura Harkcom	December 13, 2006
Having learned of the Occupant of the Room, Joe searches for him in the hopes of learning more about the Event, believing that the Occupant may be the Prime Object. Objects which appear or are mentioned: Scissors, Flask, Cufflinks; Quarter; Glass Eye; Ashtray; Pack of Cigarettes; Nail Clippers; other Objects stored in the Collectors' Vault; Wedding Photo

== DVD release ==
Release dates	Region 1	Region 2	Region 4
Release dates	April 3, 2007	August 27, 2007	March 11, 2009

The miniseries is presented as six "one-hour" (44 minute) episodes, rather than as three "two-hour" episodes as originally broadcast. The titles of the original three episodes are broken out, in the same order, across the six episode set: "The Key", "The Clock", "The Comb", "The Box", "The Eye" and "The Occupant", the last being an adjustment of "The Prime Object", the interchangeable names for Eddie McCleister – the living Object. The DVD includes an 18-minute-long making-of featurette, "Inside The Lost Room", with comments from the writers and actors. Part of the featurette shows "how sections of the motel were created and then deliberately aged so they looked like they were nearly 50 years old."

== Reception ==
The Lost Room received mostly positive reviews. At Rotten Tomatoes, the miniseries holds a critical rating of 77% based on 13 reviews, with an audience rating of 86%. The site's critical consensus reads, "The Lost Room dazzles with its bold supernatural vision, even when its mythology becomes overwhelmingly convoluted." It scored 58 out of 100 on review aggregator website Metacritic by critics, who called it "intriguing" but also confusing, while earning an audience approval rating of 8.3. Craig Ceramist wrote in 2012, "The show (as with most good sci-fi series) amassed a huge cult following [...] Today fans are still trying to track down copies of 'the objects' that appear in the programmes." Mike Duffy of the Detroit Free Press called it "a terrific, six-hour miniseries, beautifully written and sharply directed." David Hinckley of the New York Daily News called it "a very complex metaphysical mystery, the enjoyment of which comes, in no small part, from the surprises that spill out as it slowly unfurls." A negative review from Matt Roush of TV Guide called it "an especially silly descent into incoherence."

Entertainment Weekly's Gillian Flynn writes, "The Lost Room is stark noir, pulpy fiction, spiritual thriller, hero's-quest fantasy, and brainy videogame all at once. It's one of the most creative ideas to hit TV in a while. It falls to pieces at the end — but it's so much fun along the way you almost won't care... A large part of the fun is watching Miller learn to maneuver through his new, weird world, gathering clues that will bring back his daughter — it's like Riven meets Lord of the Rings." Alex Doyle enthuses, "The Lost Room was, hands down, the best thing ever produced by the Sci-Fi channel... The few loose ends left could have set up another round of storytelling in the world."

The Sci Fi Freak Site calls it "not just such an original idea, but so original as to be astonishing," "fiercely original, irresistibly clever," and so "otherworldly, that you can't help but get drawn into it." The website Interesting Engineering (which gives meticulous descriptions of the Objects and considers scientific aspects of the miniseries), calls it "brilliant" and "a mind-bending excursion." Rob Buckley of website The Medium is Not Enough writes, "It alternates between dramatic, comedic, and intellectually exciting within minutes and keeps you engrossed the whole way through, avoiding most of the possible clichés that could have arisen." Den of Geek, awarding it 5 stars out of 5, praises it as being full of twists with "a complexed, careful and utterly believable mythos."

The acting has also been praised. Josie Kafka of Doux Reviews (who finds the miniseries "enchanting" and compares it with Primer) writes, "Krause brings a necessary deadpan incredulity to the proceedings," and declares Pollak and Jacobson to be standouts. The website Television Heaven lauds the acting skills of Pollak and Bremner, the "excellent" performance of Dennis Christopher, and the "charismatic central performance by Krause." Moria, a website for fantastic-genre reviewing, in a 4-out-of-4-star review calls in several actors and actresses for attention, especially the "good comic support from Peter Jacobson as a homeless man with the bus ticket, while Ewen Bremner gives an exceedingly eccentric and strange, albeit by the end of the episode, also endearingly likeable performance as the man with the comb."

=== Awards ===
The Lost Room received two Emmy Award nominations, for Outstanding Main Title Design — the title credits show the Objects, with the leading actors appearing in black-and-white or sepia snapshots à la the Wedding Photo — and Outstanding Sound Mixing for a Miniseries or a Movie. The miniseries was nominated for Best Presentation on Television at the 33rd Saturn Awards. Writers Laura Harkcom, Christopher Leone, and Paul Workman were nominated for a 2008 Writers Guild of America Award.

=== Legacy and influence ===
Reviewer David Yates writes in a 2023 retrospective, "Though it's only three 90-minute episodes long, The Lost Room packs more backstory and plot developments into that runtime than lesser shows manage in entire seasons. The effects and interactions of the objects and rules that govern them are well thought-out and consistent, making most of the twists gratifying rather than arbitrary. The premise remains fresh even nearly twenty years later – this is a story about supernatural events that doesn't lean on religion, witchcraft, aliens, folklore, or any other common tropes, choosing instead to make its own distinctly modern mythology."

Yates is interested in works of creepypasta that appeared shortly after The Lost Room: "The series aired in December 2006, and in early 2007, both SCP-173 and The Holder of the End appeared on 4chan. Both of these pieces spawned long-running collaborative internet horror fiction projects built around numbered lists of objects with strange properties – namely, SCP and The Holders. The latter, with its exhortation that the objects 'must never come together' and a collector named Legion is especially synchronistic."

== Canceled comic book continuation ==
In July 2010, the series' creators announced at the 2010 San Diego Comic-Con that Red 5 Comics would publish a sequel, in comic book form, to The Lost Room. Publication was expected in late summer or early autumn 2011. The January 2012 update from Red 5 stated that although production of the comic had "slowed" due to the creators being pulled into other projects, Red 5 Comics was still "100% committed to completing this comic". As of April 2013, the project was put on hold indefinitely.

== See also ==
- Locke & Key – a 2008 American graphic novel series from IDW Publishing, written by Joe Hill and illustrated by Gabriel Rodriguez with a similar main concept to The Lost Room, featuring a set of magical objects with different properties including a key that opens any door to anywhere
- Locke & Key – an American fantasy drama television series (2020-2022) based on the comic books
- SCP Foundation
- Warehouse 13
- Friday the 13th: The Series
- Control – a 2019 video game dealing with mundane objects gaining metaphysical powers, as well as a mysterious hotel serving as a link between some objects
