= Aloha, Bobby and Rose =

1975 film

- Theatrical release poster
- Directed by: Floyd Mutrux
- Written by: Floyd Mutrux
- Produced by: Fouad Said
- Starring: Paul Le Mat; Dianne Hull
- Cinematography: William A. Fraker
- Edited by: Danford B. Greene
- Music by: Jaime Mendoza-Nava
- Production company: Cine Artists International
- Distributed by: Columbia Pictures
- Release date: April 29, 1975 (United States)
- Running time: 88 minutes
- Country: United States
- Language: English
- Budget: $600,000
- Box office: $35 million

Aloha, Bobby and Rose is a 1975 American road drama film written and directed by Floyd Mutrux, and starring Paul Le Mat, Dianne Hull, Martine Bartlett, Tim McIntire, Leigh French, Robert Carradine, and Noble Willingham. The plot concerns a young working-class couple who accidentally cause the death of a store clerk during their first date and go on the run from the law.

== Plot ==
In 1970s Hollywood, Bobby works as an auto mechanic by day and shoots pool and races his red 1968 Chevrolet Camaro by night. His friend Moxey is excited to be accepted to transmission school and build his skills for a better-paying job. The less responsible Bobby seems to have no such direction in life and is still relying on his uncle Charlie, a used-car salesman, to help him out of jams, such as by lending him money to pay off his poolhall bets to some menacing Chicanos.

Rose is the young single mother of a five-year-old son. Rose and her son live with her mother, who minds the boy while Rose works at a car wash. Bobby meets Rose when he returns her Volkswagen Beetle Cabriolet after it had been serviced at his garage. Bobby tries to charm Rose into driving him back to the garage, but she refuses and tells him to take the bus. Later, she sees him unsuccessfully trying to hitchhike in the rain and picks him up. When Rose stops at her house to change, Bobby discovers that she has a young son, but he is not bothered by it and spends time talking to the boy.

Bobby and Rose go on a date, including ice skating, window shopping, a stop at Pink's Hot Dogs, parking under the Hollywood Sign and cruising the Sunset Strip. They daydream about moving to Hawaii. During a stop at a convenience store for wine, Bobby pulls a prank on the teenage store clerk by pretending he is a robber with a fake gun. But the joke backfires when the shop owner emerges from the back room with a shotgun pointed at Bobby. To save Bobby, Rose hits the owner over the head with a bottle, and as he falls, the gun fires, accidentally killing the young clerk.

Bobby and Rose flee, first in Rose's VW, which they crash, and then in Bobby's red Camaro, heading for Mexico. Rose misses her son and at one point boards a bus to return home, but she cannot leave Bobby and exits the bus. In San Diego, the pair meet flamboyant Texans Buford and Donna Sue, who invite Bobby and Rose to go to Mexico with them. The two couples travel to Tijuana where Buford and Bobby bond in the party atmosphere, but Rose still misses her son, so Bobby and Rose leave Mexico and return to Los Angeles to retrieve him.

After painting Bobby's car black and picking up Rose's son, Bobby and Rose stop at an ice-cream parlor on the way out of town, where Rose leaves her son alone in the car for a few minutes while going inside. A police officer sees the boy alone in the car. Upon seeing police surrounding their car, Bobby and Rose abandon the car, leaving her son to be taken by the police, and hurry to a nearby cheap motel to hide out. Bobby calls his uncle Charlie to bring him a getaway car, but Rose separately contacts the police, who have her son, and tells them that she wants to talk about the recent "accident," offering the name of the motel where she and Bobby are staying. The police arrive that night in a rainstorm just as Charlie drives up with the getaway car. As Bobby runs toward the car, the police mistakenly think that he has a gun and, despite Rose's screams, shoot Bobby down. Rose cries over Bobby's body.

== Cast ==
- Paul Le Mat as Bobby
- Dianne Hull as Rose
- Tim McIntire as Buford
- Leigh French as Donna Sue
- Martine Bartlett as Rose's Mother
- Noble Willingham as Uncle Charlie
- Robert Carradine as Moxey
- Erick Hines as Erick
- Mario Gallo as Benny
- Tony Gardenas as Rafael
- Edward James Olmos as Chicano #1 (as Eddie Olmos)
- Tip Fredell as Chicano #2
- William Dooley as Sam Gold
- Cliff Emmich as Bird Brain
- David Bond as Grocer
- Dorothy Love as Motel Clerk

== Release ==
The film was distributed by Columbia Pictures. Although production began on October 22, 1973, the release date was April 29, 1975.

=== Box office ===
The film was produced on a low budget of $600,000, but it topped the American box office during its opening weekend (April 25–26), earning $5.3 million on 557,000 admissions from 365 screens. As of May 20, 1975, it had grossed ($35 million). The film was the seventh-highest-grossing American film of 1975. According to Variety, the film earned $6 million in theatrical rentals at the North American box office.

== Reception and legacy ==
Vincent Canby of The New York Times wrote a negative review, stating: "The only tragic thing in a film like this is the quality of stupidity the characters are forced to exhibit in order to keep the plot going." Joseph McBride of Variety wrote: "Youth-on-the-lam theme, the staple of so many pix in the last 10 years, is getting tired, and the fatigue shows clearly in 'Aloha, Bobby and Rose.'" Gene Siskel of the Chicago Tribune awarded the film two stars out of four and dismissed it as "one of those overwrought sob stories about a young couple who are always getting in trouble. The guy's got a slightly brutish outlook on the world; the girl knows how to twist her hair and cry a lot." Charles Champlin of the Los Angeles Times wrote that the film "plays like a rehash of several dozen movies that you've sat through before, restlessly. You wince to see the waste of two attractive performers and a fair amount of competent craftsmanship on material so lacking in originality, aptness of thought or simple interest." Gary Arnold of The Washington Post called it "an inarticulate film about inarticulate characters." In a retrospective review, Richard Brody of the New Yorker described it as a "tough, uncompromising, and inventive independent film that cleaned up at the box office."

A review in Time Out compared the film with the critically acclaimed 1973 film American Graffiti, which also starred Le Mat, but the review goes on to say: "[W]ith little characterisation or depth, the plot doesn't finally add up to much more than a coda to Graffiti."

== See also ==
- List of American films of 1975
- New Hollywood
