= 20th Digital Studio =

American web series and web films production and distribution company

- Formerly: Fox Digital Studio (2008–2014); Zero Day Fox (2014–2020)
- Type: Division
- Industry: Digital Media
- Genre: Web Films; Web series
- Founded: 2008; 18 years ago
- Defunct: April 26, 2023; 3 years ago
- Fate: Closed
- Successors: 20th Century Studios; 20th Television; Searchlight Pictures; WorthenBrooks
- Headquarters: Century City, California, United States
- Area served: Worldwide
- Number of employees: 450 (2017)
- Parent: 20th Century Studios
- Website: www.20thdigitalstudio.com (now redirects to 20th Century Studios website)

20th Digital Studio (also known as 20th Digital, formerly known as Fox Digital Studio and Zero Day Fox) was an American web series and web films production company of 20th Century Studios. Founded in 2008 as a digital media, it was a subsidiary of 20th Century Studios, a subsidiary of Disney Entertainment (under Walt Disney Studios), which is itself a division of The Walt Disney Company. Their focus evolved to funding and producing short-form genre content by new filmmakers from the digital and film festival worlds. 20th Digital Studios produced web series such as Vin Diesel's The Ropes, Wolfpack of Reseda, Let's Big Happy, Suit Up, Bad Samaritans, and Suit Up 2, as well as films like Shotgun Wedding. Suit Up, starring Marc Evan Jackson, is the first of the studio's shows to be picked up for a second season. It was produced in partnership with DirecTV.

20th Digital Studio is one of the 21st Century Fox studios that was acquired by Disney on March 20, 2019. The studio's current name was adopted on August 10, 2020, in order to avoid confusion with Fox Corporation. It was announced that the digital content division 20th Digital Studio was dissolved by Disney in April 2023 as part of a series of cutbacks and layoffs at the company and 20th Digital Studio's leading EVP David Worthen Brooks had been transitioned into a first-look deal with Hulu, 20th Digital's main distributor, as he became an independent producer and launched a new production company titled WorthenBrooks.

== Films ==
- Shotgun Wedding (2013)
- How to Be a Man (2013)
- E.T.X.R. (2014)
- Parallels (2015)
- Mono (2016)
- Grimcutty (2022)
- Matriarch (2022)
- Clock (2023)
- Jagged Mind (2023)
- Appendage (2023)
- The Mill (2023)

== Television films and series ==
- The Ropes (2011)
- Wolfpack of Reseda (2012)
- Let's Big Happy (2012)
- Suit Up (2012)
- Bad Samaritans (2013)
- Suit Up 2 (2014)
- Phenoms (2018)
- Small Shots (2018)
- Bite Size Halloween (2020)

== Shorts ==
- Carved (2018); co-production with Harding Films
- The Hug (2018)
- The Rizzle (2018); co-production with Perception Pictures

== Logo ==
The original Fox Digital Studio logo was created in 2007 by UK-based motion graphics and 3D artist Robert Holtby. As of 2013, Holtby updated the logo to reflect the new Fox Digital Studio rebranding, as "Zero Day Fox" and to move it more in line with the other 20th Century Fox logos created by Blue Sky Studios.

A print logo for 20th Digital Studio was made in line with 20th Television's logo, following Disney's removal of the "Fox" brand from the 21st Century Fox assets acquired in 2019 to avoid confusion with Fox Corporation.

On December 1, 2022, the finishing shot of 20th Digital Studio’s new logo was leaked from a promotional Instagram and Twitter post of Hulu’s Grimcutty. On April 11, 2023 (just 2 weeks before the closure), Holtby posted an official onscreen intro along with two alternate variations on his YouTube channel, all of which are now based on Picturemill's design and Blue Sky Studios' animation.
