= Texas Fear Fest =

- Status: Ended
- Genre: Horror/Media
- Locations: Dallas, Texas
- Country: United States
- Inaugurated: 2007
- Most recent: 2008 (2011 event canceled)
- Organizer: John Gray, Sean Clark, Rich Carlin
- Filing status: For Profit
- Website: http://www.txfearfest.com/

Texas Fear Fest was a horror-oriented for-profit media event held in the Dallas, Texas, area. Guests included actors, directors, and producers from classic and upcoming horror films. Texas Fear Fest was organized by John Gray and presented in conjunction with horror websites "Pit of Horror" and "Dread Central". Despite the apparent success of the first three events, the organization collapsed in 2011 due to internal issues which forced the cancellation of scheduled and future events.

== Past events ==
=== Texas Fear Fest - March 2007 ===
The first Texas Fear Fest was held March 23–25, 2007, at the Mesquite Convention Center in Mesquite, Texas, and presented by horror websites Pit of Horror and Dread Central. Guests included David Arquette, Gunnar Hansen, Bill Johnson, R.A. Mihailoff, Andrew Bryniarski, Joe Dante, Richard Tyson, and Kane Hodder.

The Fear Fest Icon Award was to be presented to The Texas Chain Saw Massacre director and guest of honor Tobe Hooper, but he canceled at the last minute due to an ear infection that prevented him from boarding the airplane.

=== Texas Fear Fest 2 - March 2008 ===
Texas Fear Fest 2 poster

The second Texas Fear Fest was held March 7–9, 2008, at the Omni Park West Hotel in Dallas, Texas. The Guest of Honor at this event was Freddy Krueger actor Robert Englund as part of an A Nightmare on Elm Street reunion featuring Heather Langenkamp, Amanda Wyss, Nick Corri, John Saxon, and Ronee Blakley.

Also held was a tribute to A Nightmare on Elm Street 3: Dream Warriors with the stars of the film Ken Sagoes, Rodney Eastman, Jennifer Rubin, and Penelope Sudrow. A Nightmare on Elm Street 4: The Dream Master also celebrated its 20th anniversary at Texas Fear Fest. Lisa Wilcox, Brooke Theiss, Andras Jones, and Kelly Jo Minter from A Nightmare on Elm Street 5: The Dream Child also appeared.

Friday Night Frights and Alamo Drafthouse screened the original A Nightmare on Elm Street (with the cast hosting), A Nightmare on Elm Street 4: The Dream Master (with director/cast hosting), and Fright Night with guest hosts Chris Sarandon, Stephen Geoffreys, Jonathan Stark, Amanda Bearse, William Ragsdale, and director Tom Holland. FNF also hosted a midnight screening of Troll 2 with stars Michael Stephenson, George Hardy, and Darren Ewing. The screening was held outside of the Park Westin Hotel at the Anderson Bonner Park, drive-in style. The show also featured panels, autograph signings, a tattoo artist, on-site body piercings, Q & A sessions, and on-site screenings. Other guests included Kane Hodder, CJ Graham, Ted White, Elise Avellan, Electra Avellan, PJ Soles, Brian Andrews, Lisa Wilcox, Andras Jones, Dick Warlock, Brad Loree, Nick Mennell, Daeg Faerch, Adam Weisman, Hanna Hall, Jenny Gregg Stewart, Joe Knetter, Michael Christopher (the Hare Krishna Zombie from Dawn of the Dead), Lezlie Deane, Paul Ehlers, Ethan Terra, Kim Myers, Giovanni Lombardo Radice, Ari Lehman, Linnea Quigley, Jewel Shepard, Beverly Randolph, director Neil Marshall, director Tim Sullivan, Diamond Dallas Page, E.T. star Henry Thomas, Christa Campbell, Amy Baniecki, Tryg Littlefield, and Lou Perryman.

Texas Fear Fest also held a Saturday night concert featuring former Misfits singer Michale Graves headlining, Ari Lehman and First Jason, The Razorblade Dolls, The Horrifics, and Viper Rash. At midnight on Saturday, Fear Fest screened the world premiere of Black Devil Doll, hosted by director Jonathan Lewis.

=== Texas Fear Fest 3 - November 2008 ===
Texas Fear Fest 3 poster

The third Texas Fear Fest was held November 7–9, 2008, at the Arlington Convention Center in Arlington, Texas, in conjunction with Wizard World Texas. The featured guests were Corey Feldman and Danny Trejo. Other guests included George P. Wilbur and Tom Morga as part of the 20th anniversary of Halloween 4: The Return of Michael Myers and a Friday the 13th: A New Beginning reunion featuring director Danny Steinmann, John Shepherd, Shavar Ross, Dick Wieand, Tom Morga, Debi Sue Voorhees, Miguel A. Núñez Jr., and Carol Locatell. Fear Fest 3 featured a The Monster Squad mini-reunion featuring Tom Noonan and Tom Woodruff, Jr. The event had originally been scheduled for October 3–5, 2008, the same weekend as FenCon V, a local literary science fiction convention.

== Cancelled events ==
=== Camp Blood: Friday the 30th ===
The fourth Fear Fest, titled "Camp Blood: Friday the 30th:", was scheduled for May 13–15, 2011, but was canceled in February 2011. The event was planned to host cast and crew from all 11 original Friday the 13th films, the 2009 remake, and the television series. This event was originally scheduled for August 13–15, 2010, but legal and logistical issues forced a postponement and relocation. Originally scheduled at a lakeside hotel in Lewisville, Texas, "Camp Blood" was last booked into the Crowne Plaza North Dallas in Addison, a venue used by several other local genre conventions.
