= Floyd Mutrux =

American dramatist

- Born: June 25, 1941 (age 84); United States
- Other names: Charles Floyd Mutrux
- Occupations: Writer, film director, stage director, producer, screenwriter

Floyd Mutrux (born June 25, 1941) is an American stage and film director, writer, producer, and screenwriter.

== Career ==
He began his work in Hollywood as an uncredited writer for Two-Lane Blacktop (1971). His career continued with The Christian Licorice Store (1971; writer/producer), Dusty and Sweets McGee (1971; writer, producer and director) and Freebie and the Bean (1974; story and executive producer). He wrote and directed Aloha, Bobby and Rose (1975) and The Hollywood Knights (1980). Mutrux also directed American Hot Wax (1978). His later work includes Dick Tracy (1990; executive producer), American Me (1992; writer/executive producer), Blood In Blood Out (1993; screenplay), There Goes My Baby (1994; writer/director) and Mulholland Falls (1996; story).

Mutrux co-wrote the musical theater productions Million Dollar Quartet (2010), Baby It's You! (2009). and Heartbreak Hotel, which opened at the Broadway Playhouse in Chicago on June 30, 2018, and closed on September 9, 2018. He and co-writer Colin Escott were nominated for a Tony Award for Million Dollar Quartet.

== Personal life ==
Mutrux studied in New York while working at Second City, Chicago, and later attended Columbia University.

Floyd Mutrux was previously married to Gail Mutrux and later to Penny Long. He has a son, Ashley, with Long. He later married choreographer Birgitte Mutrux.

== Litigation ==
In July 2012, Cleopatra Records sued Mutrux and Mutrux's company, Northern Lights, Inc. in Los Angeles to recover money that Cleopatra had invested in several of Mutrux's productions, including Million Dollar Quartet, "Heartbreak Hotel," Baby It's You!, and "The Boy from New York City." Cleopatra alleged that although Cleopatra had agreed to invest a certain amount in a joint venture with Mutrux in 2004, in the years following, Cleopatra's former CPA Joel Keyser (who was fired for embezzlement in 2012) had secretly funneled additional money to Mutrux over the years. Cleopatra sued Mutrux and his companies for various claims, including fraud, conversion, breach of contract, and rescission. Later in the litigation, it was established that the total amount paid to Mutrux amounted to approximately $830,000, and that Mutrux had used virtually all of the money for his personal expenses, unrelated to the musical productions. Trial was held in the Los Angeles Superior Court in December 2014, and on August 5, 2015, judgment was entered against Mutrux and his companies, on the rescission claim, in the amount of $965,851.47.

In March 2010, plaintiff Michael Drescher sued Mutrux and Mutrux's company, Northern Lights, Inc. for theft, conversion, and fraudulent misrepresentation with regard to $800,000 that Drescher had invested in 2007 and 2008 in the production of Baby It's You!. Drescher filed the case in federal court in Wisconsin, but the case was later transferred to federal court in Los Angeles. The First Amended Complaint in that action contains allegations that although Drescher believed that the funds were to be used for the production, Mutrux "in fact diverted all of plaintiff's money, using it to pay his own personal expenses," and that Mutrux had refused to allow Drescher to audit the production and refused to account to Drescher. The case later settled, although Drescher later claimed that the settlement was obtained through Mutrux's fraud, and appealed to the Ninth Circuit, which denied the appeal and refused to overturn the district court's enforcement of the settlement.
