= Code 3 (film) =

2025 American comedy drama film

- Theatrical release poster
- Directed by: Christopher Leone
- Written by: Patrick Pianezza; Christopher Leone
- Produced by: Matt Smith; Lawrence Mattis; Justin Baldoni; Andrew Calof; Paul "Pizza" Pianezza
- Starring: Rainn Wilson; Lil Rel Howery; Aimee Carrero; Page Kennedy; Rob Riggle; Yvette Nicole Brown
- Cinematography: Mark Williams
- Edited by: Jay Friedkin
- Music by: Maximilian Eberle
- Production companies: Wayfarer Studios; Circle of Confusion; Concourse Media
- Distributed by: Aura Entertainment
- Release date: September 12, 2025
- Running time: 100 minutes
- Country: United States
- Language: English

Code 3 is a 2025 American comedy drama film written by Christopher Leone and Patrick Pianezza, directed by Leone and starring Rainn Wilson, Lil Rel Howery and Aimee Carrero.

== Plot ==
Randy and his partner Mike are paramedics. Frequently feeling chastised, overworked, and overlooked by both healthcare professionals and fellow uniformed personnel, Randy attends a job interview at an insurance company, highlighting that he is burned out. Believing he did not get the position, he reports for his next shift feeling dejected and irritable. His mood worsens when his supervisor, Shanice, assigns him a student ride-along, Jessica. That night marks the beginning of Randy’s grueling 24-hour shift with Mike and Jessica.

Six hours into the shift, Randy receives a call offering him the insurance job. Elated, he shares the news, but Shanice instructs him to complete his shift before moving on to his new position. The remainder of the night is intense and emotionally taxing. The team treats a man with a stick lodged in his eye, tragically loses an 11-year-old boy after delivering him to the hospital, and restrains a mentally disturbed individual who believes he is the President of the United States—an encounter that nearly results in both the patient and Mike being shot by police officers on the scene. Initially, Jessica is highly critical of Randy’s decisions and his approach to emergency care. However, as the night progresses, she begins to understand why Paramedics do what they do—especially Randy, who has served in the field for 18 years.

Near the end of the shift, the crew responds to a severe car crash and becomes the first on the scene to successfully save a mother and her baby. Labeling them as Priority 1 patients, Randy decides to divert to the nearest hospital despite being instructed to transport them to the university hospital. Upon arrival, the team is reprimanded by Chief Dr. Serano, until Jessica intervenes and reveals herself to be the new ER resident.

At the end of the night, Randy is surprised with a heartfelt farewell from his colleagues and supervisor for his last shift. After beginning his new job at the insurance company, Randy struggles to adapt to the slow, calm pace of office work. Realizing he belongs in the field, he quits and returns to his role as a paramedic.

== Cast ==
- Rainn Wilson as Randy
- Lil Rel Howery as Mike
- Aimee Carrero as Jessica
- Page Kennedy as Officer Taggert
- Rob Riggle as Dr. Serano
- Yvette Nicole Brown as Shanice

== Production ==
In January 2023, it was announced that Wilson and Howery would star and executive produce the film. Later that month, it was announced that Carrero was cast opposite Wilson and Howery. In February 2023, it was announced that Brown, Kennedy and Fuller were cast in the film and that production was underway. Later that month, it was announced that Harris was cast. Filming occurred in Hawthorne, California, Inglewood, California, and Santa Clarita, California, in February and March 2023.

== Release ==
In May 2025, Aura Entertainment acquired the distribution rights, with the film being released in theaters on September 12, 2025. Code 3 was released on Amazon, Apple, and other rental services on September 30, 2025. It began streaming on Hulu on January 9, 2026.

== Reception ==
On the review aggregator website Rotten Tomatoes, 79% of 29 critics' reviews are positive, with an average rating of 7.4/10.

Ben Gibbons of Screen Rant rated the film a 9 out of 10. Shawn Van Horn of Collider rated the film a 7 out of 10. Julian Roman of MovieWeb rated the film a 3.5 out of 5. Clint Worthington of RogerEbert.com awarded the film three stars out of four.
