= Alec Jason =

English actor (1911–2000)

- Born: Alexander Jason; 13 July 1911; London, England, United Kingdom
- Died: 2 October 2000 (aged 89); Los Angeles, California, United States
- Occupation: Actor
- Spouse: Marie Goldblatt

Alec Jason (born Alexander Jason on 13 July 1911 in London - died 2 October 2000 in Los Angeles) was an English actor. He is the father of Harvey Jason and he was married to Marie Goldblatt until her death.

== Filmography ==
- Until the End of the World (1991) ... as Narcotics Agent
- Midnight Caller
  - episode The Language Barrier ... as Grady
  - episode Do You Believe in Miracles? ... as Uniform No.1
- Dr. Minx (1975) ... as Motel Owner
- The Specialist (1975) ... as Witness
- I Wonder Who's Killing Her Now? ... as Dr. DeHart
