= Crown International Pictures =

Defunct film studio

- Company type: Private
- Industry: Film
- Founded: 1959; 67 years ago
- Founder: Newton P. Jacobs
- Defunct: 1992; 34 years ago
- Fate: Closed
- Headquarters: Beverly Hills, California, US

Crown International Pictures (CIP) was an independent film studio and distribution company formed in 1959 by Newton P. Jacobs.

== History ==
Jacobs was a branch head of RKO Pictures until 1947, when he formed Favorite Films, an organization which released films acquired from the studios which had originally produced them, long after their first run release. CIP became one of the first franchise distributors for American International Pictures (AIP) product. Like AIP, Crown International is primarily known for low-budget genre films, including biker films, exploitation films, and B-movie drive-in fare.

Crown International began releasing both low-budget films as Bloodlust! and The Seventh Commandment, by American producers, as well as foreign films such as First Spaceship on Venus and Varan the Unbelievable (released as a double feature in 1962) which Crown was able to acquire inexpensively, due to the US dollar's strength. Crown began producing its own films, starting with Coleman Francis' The Skydivers, in 1963.

Beginning in 1961, Crown began by releasing six films, with the number rising to 12 a decade years later. Jacobs felt that Crown survived by having carefully planned growth and not overextending its product. He said that Crown did not want to be regarded as a mini major studio but as the top of the independents, to give the company more freedom in selecting and exploiting its film library. Well over 50% of exhibitors showing Crown's products were drive-in theatres, with the number decreasing to 30% in 1981.

Crown often re-titled its releases to make them sound more exciting or exploit current trends. Jacobs told the Los Angeles Times in November 1963, "A title is the handle . . . You can't lift a picture very high if the handle is weak"

Crown also acted as importer for Sonny Chiba's Street Fighter films to the United States.

In 1973, Mark Tenser, who had been vice-president, became president with Jacobs' ascension to become chairman of the board. Jacobs' daughter Marilyn Jacobs Tenser became vice president. The company handled its in-house production division, Marimark Productions, to produce a majority of the Crown's later output.

The director of Death Machines (1976) gave an account of how Crown picked up and shot new scenes for his film that included shooting a prologue that would make the martial arts film a science-fiction one to make it more in line with current box-office trends.

In 1983, Crown International Pictures launched a new international division Crown International Pictures Export Corporation, whereas it took over duties from previous firm distributor who had once got a contract from Crown, Manson International, in order to market sales of Crown's own pictures internationally. In 1987, Crown International Pictures, signed a three-title deal with RCA/Columbia Pictures Home Video, which resulted in RCA/Columbia picking up home video rights to Crown's in-house production Hunk, as well as acquisitions handled by Crown, which are Scorpion and Jocks, of which all three Crown films will be headed to home video this summer.

In July 1988, Jacobs died in a motorcycle accident, which resulted in his son, Louis, taking the helm of Crown International.

== Filmography ==
Year	Title	Notes	Ref
1961	The Beast of Yucca Flats		
1961	Bloodlust!		
1961	The Devil's Hand		
1961	The Seventh Commandment		
1962	Carnival of Crime		
1962	Secret File: Hollywood		
1962	Dangerous Charter		
1962	Stakeout		
1962	First Spaceship on Venus (金星ロケット発進す)	US English dubbed version	
1962	Varan the Unbelievable (大怪獣バラン)	US re-edited English dubbed adaptation	
1963	As Nature Intended	US re-edited version	
1963	Terrified		
1963	Madmen of Mandoras	Adapted to They Saved Hitler's Brain in 1968	
1963	The Skydivers		
1964	Iron Angel		
1964	Vengeance		
1964	The Creeping Terror		
1965	Angel's Flight		
1965	Indian Paint		
1965	Orgy of the Dead		
1966	To the Shores of Hell		
1966	The Hostage		
1967	Guilt (Tills. med Gunilla månd. kväll o. tisd.)	US English dubbed version	
1967	The Road to Nashville		
1967	Mondo Balordo	A Mondo film	
1967	The Hellcats		
1967	Catalina Caper		
1967	Hell on Wheels		
1967	The Wild Rebels		
1968	Single Room Furnished		
1968	I, a Lover (Jag - en älskare)	US English dubbed version	
1968	Terror in the Jungle		
1968	The Fountain of Love (Die Liebesquelle)	US English dubbed version	
1969	The Big Hunt	US release	
1969	African Safari (aka Rivers of Fire and Ice)		
1969	The Fantastic Plastic Machine		
1969	The Sidehackers		
1969	Nightmare in Wax		
1969	The Babysitter		
1969	Blood of Dracula's Castle		
1970	Cindy & Donna		
1970	Noon Sunday		
1970	Weekend with the Babysitter		
1970	Blood Mania		
1971	The Young Graduates		
1971	Wild Riders		
1971	Chain Gang Women		
1971	Point of Terror		
1971	The Pink Angels		
1972	The Stepmother		
1972	Blue Money		
1972	Stanley		
1973	The Naked Countess (Die nackte Gräfin)	US English dubbed version	
1973	Little Laura and Big John		
1973	Santee		
1973	Superchick		
1973	Horror High		
1973	Kung Fu Mama (山東老娘)	US English dubbed version	
1974	The Sister-in-Law		
1974	Policewomen		
1974	The Teacher		
1974	Where the Red Fern Grows		
1975	Trip with the Teacher		
1975	The Specialist		
1975	Best Friends		
1975	Las Vegas Lady		
1975	Pick-Up		
1975	Welcome Home Brother Charles (aka Soul Vengeance)		
1976	The Pom Pom Girls		
1976	Hustler Squad		
1976	Death Machines		
1976	Death Riders		
1976	Satan's Slave		
1977	The Van		
1977	Land of the Minotaur		
1977	The Crater Lake Monster		
1978	Sextette		
1978	Coach		
1978	Dracula's Dog (aka Zoltan...Hound of Dracula)		
1978	Malibu Beach		
1978	French Quarter		
1979	Van Nuys Blvd.		
1979	Burnout		
1979	Malibu High		
1979	Terror	US release	
1980	Don't Answer the Phone!		
1980	Galaxina		
1980	The Hearse		
1980	The Kidnapping of the President		
1981	McVicar	US release	
1981	The High Country		
1981	The Last Chase		
1981	Separate Ways		
1981	Improper Channels	US release	
1982	The Beach Girls		
1982	Budo: The Art of Killing		
1982	Liar's Moon		
1982	Double Exposure		
1983	My Tutor		
1983	Stacy's Knights		
1983	Americana	US theatrical release	
1983	Tender Cousins (Tendres Cousines)	US English dubbed release	
1984	Weekend Pass		
1984	Killpoint		
1984	Fleshburn		
1984	Yellow Hair and the Fortress of Gold		
1985	Tomboy		
1985	9 Deaths of the Ninja		
1985	Cavegirl		
1985	Hot Target		
1986	My Chauffeur		
1986	Low Blow		
1986	The Patriot		
1986	Scorpion		
1987	Jocks		
1987	Hunk		
1987	The Virgin Queen of St. Francis High		
1987	Deathrow Gameshow		
1988	Prime Evil		
1988	Lurkers		
1989	My Mom's a Werewolf		
1989	Night Club		
1990	Click: The Calendar Girl Killer		
1991	Top Cop		
1991	Lena's Holiday		
1991	Brain Twisters		
1992	The Silencer		
1993	Housewife From Hell		
1994	Almost Hollywood		
2003	Malibu Spring Break		

== Home media ==
In 1964, Crown packaged several of the features that it released or had acquired rights to become part of a package of the Westhampton Film Corp. American television production company Desilu entered film syndication in 1964 by acquiring the rights to show Crown International films as part of the "Westhampton Feature Package". In the 1970s Crown released films for syndication through Gold Key Entertainment, which was then a division of Vidtronics, Inc.

Many of Crown's releases have been released to DVD on BCI Home Entertainment's Welcome to the Grindhouse, Starlite Drive-In Theater and Drive-In Cult Classics series. Several Crown films have been shown on Mystery Science Theater 3000. Since Navarre Corporation's closing of its subsidiary BCI Home Entertainment, DVD distribution of Crown's library has transferred to Mill Creek Entertainment. Most of the television rights to Crown's library are today owned by Lionsgate via their 2005 acquisition of Modern Entertainment.
