= Blue Money (1972 film) =

1972 film

- Original release poster
- Directed by: Alain Patrick
- Written by: Alain Patrick
- Story by: Nick Boretz
- Produced by: Robert C. Chinn
- Starring: Alain Patrick; Barbara Caron; Inga Maria; Jeff Gall
- Narrated by: Bob Chinn
- Cinematography: Michael Stringer
- Edited by: Eugene Roth
- Music by: Jay Torrey
- Production company: Nessa Productions
- Distributed by: Crown International Pictures
- Release dates: March 11, 1972 (Japan); January 1975 (United States)
- Running time: 77 minutes 93 minutes (extended cut)
- Country: United States
- Language: English
- Box office: $8,188 (First Weekend)

Blue Money is a 1972 American soft core porn film written and directed by Alain Patrick as Alain-Patrick Chappuis and based upon a story by Nick Boretz. The film stars Alain Patrick, Barbara Caron, Inga Maria, and Jeff Gall. The film is distributed by Crown International Pictures.

== Plot ==
Yearning to create authentic films in early 1970s Hollywood, California, 25-year-old French-Canadian Jim DeSalle finds himself entangled in the adult film industry. His goal is to support his wife Lisa (Barbara Caron) and their baby, creating an illusion of the perfect life. However, unbeknownst to Jim, the local police Vice Squad has been surveilling them due to their involvement in the production and distribution of pornographic films.

Jim's seemingly idyllic life takes a dark turn. The police initiate a series of raids, his unscrupulous distributors refuse to pay him, he engages in a fling with an actress, and his wife leaves him, taking their child. To add to the chaos, creditors are aggressively pursuing him to seize his assets and evict him from his beach house. What once appeared as a life filled with promise now crumbles, leaving Jim with the imminent threat of losing everything.

As the turmoil escalates, Jim and Lisa come to the realization that their true desire is to escape from it all. It becomes clear that their only wish is to embark on a journey with Baby, sailing to the middle of the ocean, distancing themselves from the chaos that has consumed their lives. However, this revelation may come too late, as Jim discloses his longing for escape to the Vice Cop, adding a layer of uncertainty to their already tumultuous situation.

== Cast ==
- Alain Patrick as Jim
- Barbara Mills as Lisa
- Inga Maria as Ingrid
- Jeff Gall as Mike
- Oliver Auuey as The Fatman
- Steve Rourson as Freddie
- Maria Arnold, Susanne Fields, Eve Orlon, Sandy Dempsey, Susan Wescott, and Leslie Otis as Models
- Vanessa Chappuis as Baby
- John Parker as Benny
- Alex Elliot as Larry
- Bob Chinn as Narrator

(The uncredited role of the Vice Cop was done as a favor to director Alain Patrick by his friend Gary Kent).

== Production ==
The story is told in a "mockumentary" style, with a voice-over narration from the Vice Squad police officer (Bob Chinn) describing black-and-white stills and video footage (in the fictional film stated as coming from the police investigation surveillance films).

Some of those involved in the project also worked on a number of other films, such as the two leads, Alain Patrick, who worked on over 26 other film and television projects, such as Time Tunnel, Harry O, and Ironside; and, Barbara Caron (Barbara Mills), who performed in The Stewardesses and Executives' Wives, among her 38 other film projects.

As many of those who worked on the film have also worked in the industry the film portrays, the movie itself is a quasi-documentary.

=== Release ===
Although it was released in May 1972, it was not rated until 1973 and not registered for copyright until its release on VHS in 1989. It has since been released on home media and VOD with different edits and run times. It is also in a number of DVD collections of similarly themed low-budget films distributed by Crown International Pictures, such as Sextette, The Sister-in-Law and The Virgin Queen of St. Francis High, by Mill Creek Entertainment and others, as well as being shown on television.

=== Soundtrack ===
Song, "Walk in the Sun", lyrics by Clarence Morley, music and song by Jay Torrey

== Reception ==
An "insightful and well-made look behind the scenes of shooting low-budget erotica in the early 1970's", with people from the industry, such as producer Bob Chinn, cinematographer R. Michael Stringer, and performers Barbara Mills, Maria Arnold, Sandy Dempsey, Eve Orlon, and Suzanne Fields. In a "very well made film with a good story and some great performances" which "paints a fairly unhappy picture of the adult film industry", as a "small scale version of Boogie Nights", from some of those involved, at the time.

== See also ==
- List of American films of 1972
- List of American films of 1970
