= John Anderson (actor) =

American actor (1922–1992)

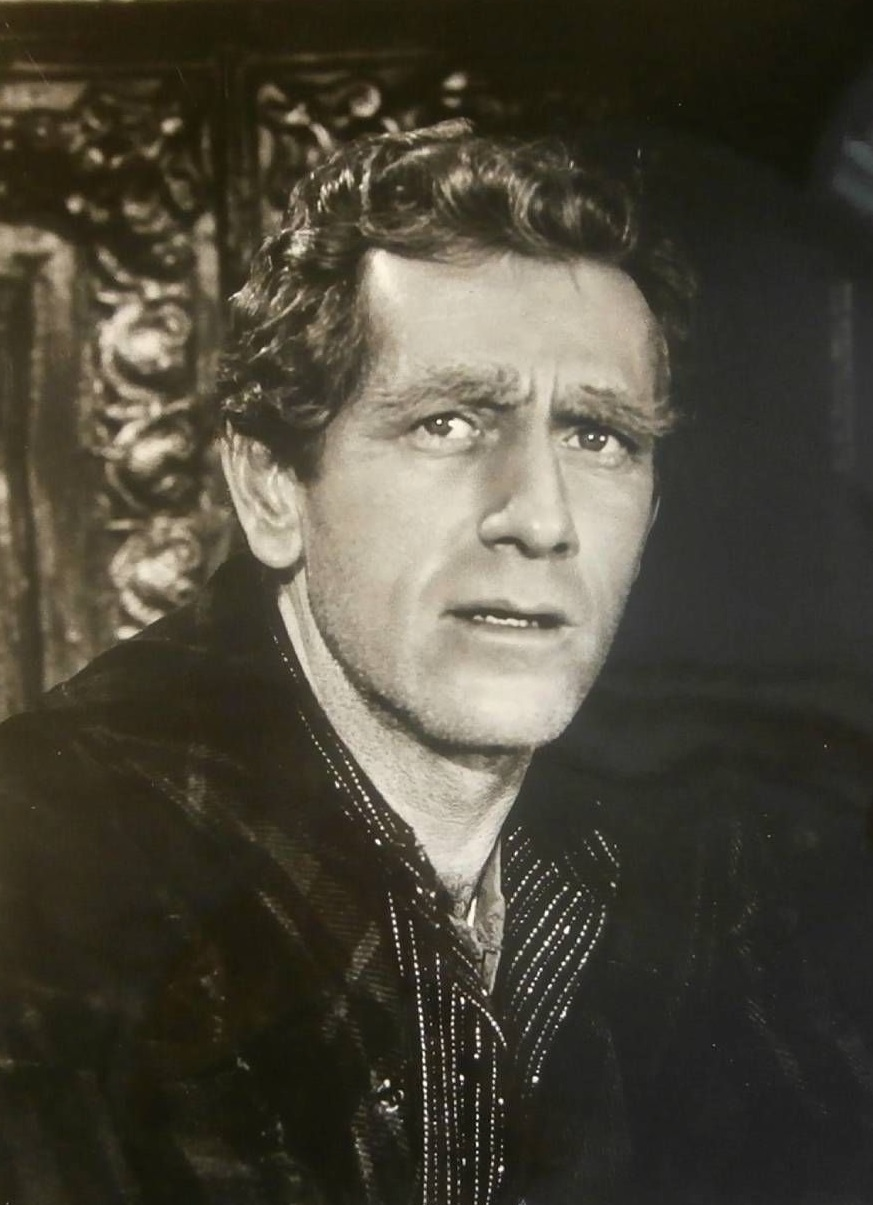
- Anderson in The Virginian, 1960s
- Born: John Robert Anderson; October 20, 1922; Clayton, Illinois, U.S.
- Died: August 7, 1992 (aged 69); Sherman Oaks, California, U.S.
- Occupation: Actor
- Years active: 1950–1992
- Spouse: Patricia A. Cason (m. 1946; died 1989)

John Robert Anderson (October 20, 1922 – August 7, 1992) was an American character actor. He was best known for his more than 500 television roles.

== Early life ==
Anderson was born in 1922 and raised in Clayton, Illinois. He studied theatre in Minnesota and Ohio and served in the United States Coast Guard during World War II before pursuing an acting career in New York City. He held a master's degree in drama from the University of Iowa. After relocating to Los Angeles, Anderson worked as a street mime, jester, and juggler.

== Career ==
Anderson appeared on Broadway, including the musical Paint Your Wagon in 1951. He was in Cat on a Hot Tin Roof from 1955 to 1956 at the Morosco Theatre. Standing 6 feet 2 inches (188 cm), Anderson bore a strong resemblance to Abraham Lincoln, whom he portrayed three times. He appeared in Alfred Hitchcock's Psycho (1960) as used car salesman "California Charlie", who sells a car to Marion Crane (Janet Leigh).

Anderson was cast on The Rat Patrol four times (three times as the same character). In 1966, he guested in a rare two-part Gunsmoke episode and had a recurring role in MacGyver as Harry Jackson, MacGyver's grandfather. The 1993 soundtrack album Music from the Television Series Quantum Leap was dedicated to his memory. He appeared in one episode shortly before his death.

== Personal life and death ==
On June 8, 1946, Anderson married Patricia A. Cason in the rectory of St. Boniface Catholic Church in Quincy, Illinois, and the couple moved to Iowa City, where Anderson studied in the liberal arts college at the University of Iowa and earned his master's degree in drama. Anderson was married to Cason until her death on February 18, 1989. Three years later, Anderson suffered a fatal heart attack at his home in Sherman Oaks, California, at the age of 69.

== Filmography ==
=== Film ===
Year	Title	Role	Director	Notes	ref
1953	The Eddie Cantor Story	Bobby (Note: Cameo appearance)	Alfred E. Green	Musical drama film	
1955	Target Zero	Guest	Harmon Jones	War drama film	
1958	The True Story of Lynn Stuart	Doc	Lewis Seiler	Biographical crime drama film	
1959	Last Train from Gun Hill	Salesman In Horseshoe	John Sturges	Western film	
1960	Psycho	California Charlie	Alfred Hitchcock	Horror film Based on the 1959 novel of the same name by Robert Bloch	
1960	The Wackiest Ship in the Army	Sailor	Richard Murphy	Comedy-drama War film Based on Big Fella Wash-Wash by Herbert Carlson	
1962	Walk on the Wild Side	Preacher	Edward Dmytryk	Drama film Based on A Walk on the Wild Side by Nelson Algren	
1962	Geronimo	Jeremiah Burns	Arnold Laven	Western film	
1962	Ride the High Country	Elder Hammond	Sam Peckinpah	Western film Released internationally as Guns in the Afternoon	
1965	The Satan Bug	Agent Reagan	John Sturges	Crime science fiction suspense film Based on the 1962 novel by Ian Stuart	
1965	The Hallelujah Trail	Sergeant Buell	John Sturges	Western epic mockumentary spoof Based on The Hallelujah Trail by Bill Gulick	
1966	Namu, the Killer Whale	Joe Clausen	László Benedek	Adventure film	
1966	The Fortune Cookie	Abraham Lincoln	Billy Wilder	Black comedy film Also known as Meet Whiplash Willie	
1967	A Covenant with Death	Dietrich	Lamont Johnson	Legal drama film Based on A Covenant with Death by Stephen Becker	
1967	Welcome to Hard Times	Ezra Maple / Isaac Maple	Burt Kennedy	Western film Based on Welcome to Hard Times by E. L. Doctorow	
1968	Day of the Evil Gun	Captain Jefferson Addis	Jerry Thorpe	Western film	
1968	A Man Called Gannon	Capper	James Goldstone	Western film Remake of Man Without a Star	
1968	5 Card Stud	Marshal Dana	Henry Hathaway	Western mystery film	
1968	Massacre Harbor	Major Indrus (Note: Released after the three-part story arc: "The Last Harbor Raid" on The Rat Patrol)	John Peyser	War action film	
1969	Heaven with a Gun	Asa Beck	Lee H. Katzin	Western film	
1969	The Great Bank Robbery	Mayor Kincaid	Hy Averback	Western comedy film Based on The Great Bank Robbery by Frank O'Rourke	
1969	Young Billy Young	Boone	Burt Kennedy	Western film Based on Who Rides with Wyatt by Will Henry	
1970	Cotton Comes to Harlem	Captain Bryce	Ossie Davis	Neo-noir film Based on Cotton Comes to Harlem by Chester Himes	
1970	Soldier Blue	Colonel Iverson	Ralph Nelson	Revisionist western film Based on Arrow in the Sun by T. V. Olsen	
1971	Man and Boy	Stretch	E.W. Swackhamer	Western film	
1972	The Stepmother	Inspector Darnezi	Howard L. Avedis	Comedy-drama film	
1972	Molly and Lawless John	Sheriff Marvin Parker	Gary Nelson	Western film	
1973	Counselor at Crime	Don Vito Albanese	Alberto de Martino	Italian-Spanish crime film Italian: Il consigliori Also known as The Counsellor	
1973	Executive Action	Halliday	David Miller	Political thriller film Fictionalized account of a conspiracy to assassinate United States President John F. Kennedy; Based on Executive Action by Donald Freed and Mark Lane	
1974	The Dove	Mike Turk	Charles Jarrott	Biographical film Based on Dove by Robin Lee Graham and Derek L.T. Gill; Produced by Gregory Peck	
1975	The Specialist	Pike Smith	Howard Avedis	Thriller film	
1977	The Lincoln Conspiracy	Abraham Lincoln	James L. Conway	Drama film Based on book of the same name by David W. Balsiger and Charles E. Sellier Jr.	
1979	Shadow of Fear	Abe Zook	Noel Nosseck	TV movie	
1979	In Search of Historic Jesus	Caiaphas	Henning Schellerup	Documentary film Based on Lee Roddy and Charles E. Sellier Jr.'s book of the same name	
1980	Out of the Blue	TV Interviewer	Dennis Hopper	Drama film Released in Canada as No Looking Back	
1980	Smokey and the Bandit II	Governor	Hal Needham	Action comedy film	
1981	Zoot Suit	Judge F.W. Charles	Luis Valdez	Drama musical film Based on Zoot Suit by Valdez	
1986	Never Too Young to Die	Arliss	Gil Bettman	Action film	
1986	Scorpion	Joel / Noel G. Koch	William Riead	Action film Also known as The Summons	
1988	Eight Men Out	Judge Kenesaw Mountain Landis	John Sayles	Sports drama film Based on Eight Men Out: The Black Sox and the 1919 World Series by Eliot Asinof	
1989	Deadly Innocents	Gus	John D. Patterson; Hugh Parks	Thriller film	

=== Television ===
Year	Title	Role	Notes	ref
1950	Fireside Theatre	Guest	Episode: "The Courting of Belle/Rendezvous"	
1952	Hallmark Hall of Fame	Guest	Episode: "Bread of Freedom"	
1952–54	Rocky King, Detective	Bartender; Theater manager	Episodes: "Murder, Ph. D."; "Return for Death"	
1954	Cavalcade of America	Guest	Episode: "Man of Glass: The Story of a Glassmaker""	
1954	Colonel Humphrey Flack	Guest	Episode: "The Wild West"	
1954	Janet Dean, Registered Nurse	Guest	Episode: "The Gomez Chase"	
1955	Gang Busters	Guest	Episode: "The Rocco Trapani Case"	
1955–56	The Phil Silvers Show	Zeke 'Ozark' Rutledge; Film Theater Orderly	Episodes: "The Reunion"; "Platoon in the Movies"	
1957–59	Trackdown	Sam Bass; McCall	Episodes: "End of an Outlaw"; "Toss Up"	
1957–60	Dick Powell's Zane Grey Theatre	Various	4 episodes	
1957	Panic!	Sheriff	Episode: "The Vigilantes"	
1957	The Court of Last Resort	Phil	Episode: "The Gordon Wallace Case"	
1958	Tombstone Territory	Allen Danbury	Episode: "The Return of the Outlaw"	
1958	Sea Hunt	Various	3 episodes	
1958	The Walter Winchell File	Burke	Episode "Exclusive Story: File #31"	
1958	Cimarron City	Sheriff Jim Martin	Episode: "I, the People"	
1958	The Californians	Various	3 episodes	
1958	Target	Guest	Episode: "So Deathly Quiet"	
1958–59	Have Gun - Will Travel	Various	3 episodes	
1958–62	Tales of Wells Fargo	Various	3 episodes	
1958–73	Gunsmoke	Various	12 episodes	
1959	U.S. Marshal	Roy Andrews	Episode: "Gold Is Wher You Find It"	
1959	Mike Hammer	Bill Thomas	Episode: "Aces and Eights"	
1959	Alcoa Theatre	Virgil Merryman	Episode: "Man of His House"	
1959	Steve Canyon	Sergeant Bulls	Episode: "The Bomb"	
1959	Peter Gunn	Sergeant Rainey	Episode: "Breakout"	
1959	Richard Diamond, Private Detective	Paul Russel	Episode: "Crown of Silla"	
1959	Yancy Derringer	Wayne Raven	Episode: "Outlaw at Liberty"	
1959	Man Without a Gun	Ab Carver	Episode: "Eye Witness"	
1959	The Rough Riders	John Healy; Matt Kane	Episodes: "End of Track"; "Ransom of Rita Renee"	
1959–60	Black Saddle	Clyde Wicker; Sam Glidden	Episodes: "Client Vardon"; "The Indian Tree"	
1959–63	The Rifleman	John Beaumont	11 episodes	
1959–63	Perry Mason	Various	3 episodes	
1959–66	Lassie	Various	3 episodes	
1960	Bronco	Andy Strudevant	Episode: "Legacy of Twisted Creek"	
1960	The Detectives	Various	3 episodes	
1960	Wanted: Dead or Alive	Deputy Sheriff Fix	Episode: "The Inheritance"	
1960	The Rebel	Ezra Taber	Episode: "Paint a House with Scarlet"	
1960	Johnny Ringo	Cartwright	Episode: "The Derelict"	
1960	The Man from Blackhawk	Walter Craig	Episode: "The Money Machine"	
1960	The Westerner	Leth Richie	Episode: "School Days"	
1960	Stagecoach West	Cole Dawson	Episode: The Land Beyond"	
1960	Dante	Harrigan	Episode: "My Pal, the Bullseye"	
1960	Harrigan and Son	Earl	Episode: "Non Compos Mentis"	
1960–61	The Life and Legend of Wyatt Earp	Virgil Earp	6 episodes	
1960–61	Lawman	Lloyd Malone; Hassayampa	Episodes: "Left Hand of the Law"; "Hassayampa Edwards"	
1960–63	Laramie	Various	6 episodes	
1960–63	The Untouchables	Various	3 episodes	
1960–63	The Twilight Zone	Various	4 episodes	
1960–64	Death Valley Days	Jim Reed; George Lynch	Episodes: "A Girl Named Virginia"; "Law of the Round Tent"	
1960–69	Bonanza	Various	3 episodes	
1961	Bat Masterson	Major Liam Mars	Episode: "The Court Martial of Major Mars	
1961	Adventures in Paradise	Benson	Episode: "Captain Butcher	
1961	87th Precinct	Biil Brewster	Episode: "The Modus Man"	
1961	King of Diamonds	Lt. Rogers; Sam Hall	Episodes: "The Wizard of Ice"; "The Uncivil Servant"	
1961	Frontier Circus	Carl	Episode: "The Hunter and the Hunted"	
1961	Cheyenne	Thackeray Smith	Episode: "Retaliation"	
1961	Alfred Hitchcock Presents	Joey 'Nick' Nicholson	Episode: "The Old Pro"	
1962–63	Alcoa Premiere	Heber Gresham; Hannibal Roth	Episodes: "Second Chance"; "Blow High, Blow Clear"	
1962–63	Stoney Burke	Bruce Austin; Foster Fowler	Episodes: "Spin a Golden Web"; "To Catch a Kaiser"	
1962–63	Dr. Kildare	Vernon Hackett; Sherwin Cullen	Episodes: "The Visitors"; "The Good Samaritan"	
1962–65	The Alfred Hitchcock Hour	Adam; Luke Hunter	Episodes: "Ride the Nightmare"; "The Second Wife"	
1962	The Tall Man	Major Judd Randolph	Episode: "Night of the Hawk"	
1962	Cain's Hundred	Kenneth Drake	Episode: "Cost of Living: Howard Judlow"	
1962	Thriller	Jacob Grant	Episode: "The Innocent Bystanders"	
1962	The Eleventh Hour	Agent Steme	Episode: "I Don't Belong in a White-Painted House"	
1962	Sam Benedict	James "Jim" Bradley	3 episodes	
1962–69	The Virginian	Various	6 episodes	
1963	The Dick Powell Theatre	Father Sheehan	Episode: "The Judge"	
1963	Route 66	General Scranton	Episode: "...Shall Forfeit His Dog and Ten Schillings to the King"	
1963	Kraft Mystery Theater	Sheriff Jim Seay	Episode: "Shadow of a Man"	
1963	Redigo	Lee Cresco	Episode: "Horns of Hate"	
1963	The Outer Limits	Ebonite Interrogator	Episode: "Nightmare"	
1963	My Favorite Martian	Captain Farrow	Episode: "Raffles No. 2"	
1963–64	The Great Adventure	Colonel Knowlton; General Andrew Jackson	Episodes: "The Story of Nathan Hale"; "The Pirate and the Patriot"	
1963–64	Ben Casey	Various	3 episodes	
1964	The Lieutenant	Joe Hammond	Episode: "Gone the Sun"	
1964	Walt Disney's Wonderful World of Color	Farmer Wills	Episode: "For the Love of Willadean"	
1964	The Adventures of Ozzie and Harriet	Café owner	Episode: "The Café Caper"	
1964–65	The Fugitive	Ed Strader; Justin Briggs	Episodes: "Come Watch Me Die"; "Scapegoat"	
1964–65	Rawhide	Captain James Rankin; Maj. Cantell	Episodes: "Incident at Hourglass"; "Retreat"	
1965	Voyage to the Bottom of the Sea	Dr. Janus	Episode: "Cradle of the Deep"	
1965	Kraft Suspense Theatre	Rankin	Episode: "Won't It Ever Be Morning"	
1965	A Man Called Shenandoah	Sheriff Haley	Episode: "Survival"	
1965	The Big Valley	Matt; Matt Bentell	Episodes: "Boots with My Father's Name"; "The Guilt of Matt Bentell"	
1966–72	The F.B.I.	Adam McDonald; Bolin	Episodes: "The Forests of the Night"; "The Loner"	
1966	The Wackiest Ship in the Army	Sergeant Mac	Episodes: "The Lamb Who Hunted Wolves, part 1"; "The Lamb Who Hunted Wolves, part 2"	
1966	Scalplock	Burton Standish	Made-for-TV movie directed James Goldstone (Note: Pilot for the series Iron Horse)	
1966	The Legend of Jesse James	Moss Canby	Episode: "The Hunted and the Hunters"	
1966	Sidekicks	Sheriff	Made-for-TV movie directed by Peter Tewksbury	
1966–68	The Rat Patrol	Major Indrus (Note: Made into 1968's Massacre Harbor directed by John Peyser); Gen. Owen Lansbury	Episodes: "The Last Harbor Raid, parts 1–3"; "The Pipeline to Disaster Raid"	
1967	The Felony Squad	Lt. Mike Reineck	Episode: "The Deadly Partner"	
1967	Tarzan	Dolan	Episode: "The Day the Earth Trembled"	
1967	The Road West	Major Perry	Episode: "Road to Glory"	
1967	Occasional Wife	Col. Thomdyke	Episode: "Oil, Be Seeing You"	
1967	Cimarron Strip	Arn Tinker	Episode: "Whitey"	
1967	Dundee and the Culhane	Kintpaush	Episode: "The Death of a Warrior Brief"	
1967	Mannix	George Blake	Episode: "Then the Drink Takes the Man"	
1968	Lancer	Sheriff	Episode: "Blood Rock"	
1969	Here Come the Brides	Silas; Gentleman Harry Smith	Episodes: "A Man's Errand"; "The Road to the Cradle"	
1970	The Andersonville Trial	Ambrose Spencer	Made-for-TV movie directed by George C. Scott	
1971	Hawaii Five-O	Brigadier General Earl Rigney	Episode: "To Kill or Be Killed"	
1971	Hitched	Jomer Cruett	Made-for-TV movie directed by Boris Sagal	
1971	Cade's County	Colonel Street	Episode: "Violent Echo"	
1971	The Animals	Sheriff Allan Pierce	Made-for-TV movie directed Ron Joy	
1971	McMillan & Wife	Sandy King	Episode: "Death Is a Seven Point Favorite"	
1971	Bearcats!	Judge Juan O'Brian	Episode: "Man in a Cage"	
1972	The Sixth Sense	The Sheriff	Episode: "Through a Flame Darkly"	
1972	Night Gallery	Sheriff	Episode "Through the Flame Darkly"	
1973–74	Hec Ramsey	Gabe Rawlins; Harry Munson	Episodes: "The Mystery of Chalk Hill"; "Dead Heat"	
1973–74	Kung Fu	Benjamin Dundee; Jack Youngblood	Episodes: "Blood Brother"; "Crossties"	
1973	Set This Town on Fire	Henry Kealey	Made-for-TV movie directed by David Lowell Rich	
1973	Call to Danger	Edward McClure	Made-for-TV movie directed by Tom Gries	
1973	Brock's Last Case	Joe Cuspis	Made-for-TV movie directed by David Lowell Rich	
1973	Cannon	Major Bliss	Episode: "Deadly Heritage"	
1973	Egan	J.R. King	Made-for-TV movie directed by Jud Taylor	
1974	Lincoln: Trial by Fire	President Lincoln	Made-for-TV movie directed by Ed Spiegel	
1974	Heatwave!	Toler	Made-for-TV movie directed by Jerry Jameson; Part of the ABC Movie of the Week	
1974	Smile Jenny, You're Dead	Col. John Lockport	Made-for-TV movie directed by Jerry Thorpe	
1974	Manhunter	Aaron Denver	Made-for-TV movie directed by Walter Grauman (Note: Pilot for the series The Manhunter)	
1974	Petrocelli	Joshua Forbes	Episode: "A Life for a Life"	
1974	The Bob Newhart Show	Mr. Charlie Colton	Episode: "The Gray Flannel Shrink"	
1975	Emergency!	Captain Bob Roberts	Episode: "Smoke Eater"	
1975	Barnaby Jones	John Albright	Episode: "Jeopardy for Two"	
1975	Dead Man on the Run	Jason Monroe	Made-for-TV movie directed by Bruce Bilson	
1975	Bicentennial Minutes	Self/Narrator	Episode: "#1.304"	
1975	Death Among Friends	Capt. Lewis	Made-for-TV movie directed by Paul Wendkos	
1975	Little House on the Prairie	Mr. Pike	Episode: "Haunted House"	
1975	The Family Holvak	McKesson	Episode: "The Devil's Chariot"	
1975	Bronk	Colonel Kecker	Episode: "Deception"	
1976	The Quest	Army Officer	Made-for-TV movie directed by Lee H. Katzin (Note: Pilot for the series The Quest)	
1976	The Dark Side of Innocence	Stephen Hancock	Made-for-TV movie directed by Jerry Thorpe	
1976	Bridger	President Andrew Jackson	Made-for-TV movie directed by David Lowell Rich	
1976	The Quest	Harper	Episode: "Shanklin"	
1976	The Rockford Files	Gerald A. O'Malley	Episode: "Coulter City Wildcat"	
1976	Rich Man, Poor Man Book II	John "Scotty" Scott	Miniseries; 7 episodes	
1976	Once an Eagle	George Varney	Miniseries	
1977–82	Quincy, M.E.	Various	3 episodes	
1977	Tail Gunner Joe	Gen. George C. Marshall	Made-for-TV movie directed by Jud Taylor	
1977	Quinn Martin's Tales of the Unexpected	Floyd Carrington	Episode: "Force of Evil" (Note: Television episode was shown March 13, 1977)	
1977	The Force of Evil	Sheriff Floyd Carrington	Made-for-TV movie directed by Richard Lang (Note: Television episode expanded into a film)	
1977	Peter Lundy and the Medicine Hat Stallion	Alexander Majors	Made-for-TV movie directed by Michael O'Herlihy; Based on San Domingo, The Medicine Hat Stallion by Marguerite Henry	
1977	The Last Hurrah	Amos Force	Made-for-TV movie political drama by Vincent Sherman; Based on the novel of the same name by Edwin O'Connor; Remake of 1958 film of the same title	
1977	Lou Grant	Russell Granger	Episode: "Takeover"	
1978	Donner Pass: The Road to Survival	Patrick Breen	Made-for-TV movie directed by James L. Conway	
1978	The Deerslayer	Hutter	Made-for-TV movie directed by Richard Friedenberg	
1979	The Incredible Hulk	Mike Callahan	Episode: "Wildfire"	
1979	Backstairs at the White House	President Franklin Delano Roosevelt	Miniseries	
1979	$weepstake$	Thomas Singer	Episode: "Pilot"	
1979	Project U.F.O.	Captain Bergstad	Episode: "Sighting 4026: The Atlantic Queen Incident"	
1980	The Misadventures of Sheriff Lobo	Col. Clayborn	Episode: "First to Finish, Last to Show"	
1980	Tenspeed and Brown Shoe	Vernon Laws	Episode: "This One's Gonna Kill Ya"	
1981	Sanford	Judge	Episode: "Here Comes the Bride: Part 2"	
1981	ABC Weekend Special	Curtis George	Episode: "Mayday! Mayday!"	
1981	The Jeffersons	Mr. Claymore	Episodes: "Florence's New Job: Part 1"; "Florence's New Job: Part 2"	
1981	Checking In	Mr. Claymore	Episode: "Block's Party"	
1981	The Greatest American Hero	General Gerald Stocker	Episode: "Operation Spoilsport"	
1981	Hart to Hart	Jim Blye	Episode: "Hart of Darkness"	
1982	Bret Maverick	General Frye	Episode: "The Vulture Also Rises"	
1982	Silver Spoons	Captain Stark	Episode: "The Great Computer Caper"	
1982	The First Time	Paul Cooper	Made-for-TV movie by Noel Nosseck	
1982	Voyagers!	Abraham Lincoln	Episode: "The Day the Rebs Took Lincoln"	
1982	Missing Children: A Mother's Story	Stanley Willard	Made-for-TV movie directed by Dick Lowry	
1982–83	Tom Cottle: Up Close	Self	Episodes: "#1.34"; "#1.84"	
1983	The Fall Guy	Al Barton	Episode: "Happy Trails"	
1983	M*A*S*H	General Addison Collins	Episode: "Say No More"	
1983	Insight	Fletcher	Episode: "The Hit Man"	
1983–1988	Dallas	Richard McIntyre (Note: Season 6, episodes 23 & 24); Dr. Herbert Styles (Note: Season 11, episodes 14, 17, 20 & 22)	6 episodes	
1984	Scarecrow and Mrs. King	Humbug-Waiter David Reilly	Episode: "The Mole"	
1984	Riptide	Walter Truman	Episode: "Diamonds Are Forever"	
1984	Sins of the Past	Rev. Donald Randolph	Made-for-TV movie directed by Peter H. Hunt	
1984	Jessie	Peckham	Episode: "The Psychic Connection"	
1984–85	Matt Houston	Judge David Myer; Capt. Conroy	Episodes: "The Monster"; "New Orleans Nightmare"	
1985	North and South	William Hazard	Miniseries; 1 episode (credited for 5 more)	
1985–90	MacGyver	"Grandpa" Harry Jackson	5 episodes	
1986	The Wonderful World of Disney	Holbrook	Episode: "I-Man"	
1986	Dream West	Brigadier General Brooke	Miniseries directed by Dick Lowry	
1986	Hardesty House	Maxwell Eaton II	Made-for-TV movie directed by Martin Davidson & R.W. Goodwin	
1986	Starman	Rayfield	Episode: "Best Buddies"	
1987	Heart of the City	Frank	Episode: "Out on a Limb"	
1987	American Harvest	Judge Meriweather	Made-for-TV movie directed by Dick Lowry	
1987	Mathnet	Roark	Episode: "The Problem of the Dirty Money"	
1987	Square One Television	Roark	Episode: "1:22"	
1987	Our House	Lt. Col. Roger Trask	Episode: "They Also Serve"	
1988	Annie McGuire	O'Reilly	Episode: "The Legend of the Bad Fish"	
1988	Hunter	Winston Taggert	Episode: "No Good Deed Goes Unpunished"	
1988	Baby Boom	Anakott	Episode: "The He-Man Woman's Hater Club"	
1989	Knightwatch	Morris	3 episodes	
1989	Full Exposure: The Sex Tapes Scandal	George Dutton	Made-for-TV movie directed by Noel Nosseck	
1989	Star Trek: The Next Generation	Kevin Uxbridge	Episode: "The Survivors"	
1990	Matlock	Sam Chandler	Episode: "The Informer: Part 1"	
1990	Follow Your Heart	Josh	Made-for-TV movie directed by Noel Nosseck	
1990	Shannon's Deal	Guest	Episode: "Sanctuary"	
1991	In Broad Daylight	Wes Westerman	Made-for-TV movie directed by James Steven Sadwith	
1991	Murder, She Wrote	Andrew Dixon	Episode: "Thursday's Child"	
1991	Babe Ruth	Judge Kenesaw Mountain Landis	Made-for-TV movie directed by Mark Tinker	
1991	Perfect Strangers	Grandpa Beaumont 'Buzz' Appleton	Episode: "Grandpa"	
1991	Daddy	George Watson	Made-for-TV movie directed by Michael Miller	
1992	Bed of Lies	Price Daniel Sr.	Made-for-TV movie directed by William A. Graham	
1992	Quantum Leap	Pat Knight	Episode: "The Last Gunfighter - November 28, 1957"	
1992	Jake and the Fatman	Ace Thompson	Episode: "All Through the Night"	
