= Pick-Up (1975 film) =

- Directed by: Bernard Hirschenson
- Screenplay by: John R. Winter
- Produced by: Bernard Hirschenson; John R. Winter
- Starring: Jill Senter; Alan Long; Gini Eastwood
- Cinematography: Bernard Hirschenson
- Production company: Winter-Gregoravich Productions
- Distributed by: Crown International Pictures
- Release date: 1975
- Running time: 80 minutes
- Country: United States
- Language: English

Pick-Up is a 1975 American film directed by Bernard Hirschenson, marketed as an exploitation film full of sexy hippies, but praised by some critics for deeper artistic qualities. The film was alternatively titled Pazuzu.

== Plot ==
Two young women, free spirit Carol (Jill Senter) and introverted Maureen (Gini Eastwood), are hitchhiking when they are picked up by hippie Chuck (Alan Long) in his mobile home. They get lost in the Florida Everglades where they have a variety of spiritual experiences.

== Production ==
It was the only feature film directed by Hirschenson, who was also an advertising man and documentary-maker. It was produced and distributed by Crown International Pictures.

== Critical reaction ==
From 1975, Film Review Digest gives it a mixed review: recognising its artistic pretensions, it says the filmmakers went "just about as far as they could dare in a commercial context".

On its DVD release in 2007, DVD Drive-In praised it as more than exploitation cinema: they called it a "stylish art movie", comparing it to Easy Rider and the symbolist films of Alejandro Jodorowsky. DVD Verdict also compared it to the work of Dennis Hopper, and compared it favorably to Michelangelo Antonioni's overblown Zabriskie Point. The Onion AV Club described a typical scene as "Two hippies make love on a stone slab in a swamp; behind them dance a baggy-pants clown and a politician sporting a ludicrously oversized campaign button." Buried.com scored it 5.9/10. DVD Talks Paul Mavis was less enthusiastic, complaining that it was dull without the influence of drugs, and the more trippy psychedelic bits were silly or unintentionally funny; however, he praised the transfer and audio as true to the source.

== Home media ==
It was released on DVD by BCI Eclipse in a 2-film pack with Howard Avedis's 1974 film The Teacher.
