= African Safari =

African Safari may refer to:

- Rivers of Fire and Ice, a 1969 film
- African Safari Airways
- Kyushu Natural Animal Park African Safari, Japan

== See also ==
- Safari
