= They're Playing with Fire =

1984 American horror-thriller movie

- Directed by: Howard Avedis
- Written by: Howard Avedis; Marlene Schmidt
- Produced by: Howard Avedis; Marlene Schmidt
- Starring: Sybil Danning; Eric Brown; Andrew Prine; Paul Clemens
- Cinematography: Gary Graver
- Edited by: Jack Tucker
- Music by: John Cacavas
- Production company: Hickmar Productions
- Distributed by: New World Pictures
- Release date: April 27, 1984
- Running time: 96 minutes
- Country: United States
- Language: English

They're Playing with Fire is a 1984 American erotic thriller film directed by Howard Avedis and starring Sybil Danning, Eric Brown, Andrew Prine, and Paul Clemens. The film reuses some elements from 1974's The Teacher also written and directed by Avedis.

== Plot ==
English literature professor, Dr. Diane Stevens, works at Ocean View College, where she hires student Jay Richard to varnish her yacht 'Lillian'. During a break, she seduces him, and they have sex. Later, while driving Jay to the gas station where he works, Diane asks him to do her a favor.

Diane and her husband, Prof. Michael, plan to use Jay in order to get a large inheritance from Lillian and Lettie Stevens, Michael's mother and grandmother. Michael prefers to wait for his relatives to die of old age, but Diane is bored of her ordinary life and threatens to leave Michael if she does not get the money soon. The two convince Jay to scare Michael's relatives out of the house so they can put them in a retirement home. Jay's attempt is thwarted when the family dog starts barking at him. Distressed, Lillian chases Jay away by shooting at him with a rifle. Shortly after, someone assassinates Lillian and Lettie. Jay runs to the boatyard, where Michael grows suspicious of him. He phones Lillian and Lettie and later discovers they were murdered. Michael accuses Jay, who in turn accuses Michael of wanting to frame him. Promising he will not go to the police, Jay vows to find out who committed the murder.

The next day, Michael starts harassing Jay. Jay tells Diane to get Michael off his case and declares he knows she was just using him. Later, Jay's girlfriend Cynthia, tries to blackmail him by threatening to show pictures of him and Diane on the yacht together to everyone on campus. Jay blows her off. When George the gardener asks about Lillian and Lettie, Michael lies about them going to Hawaii. Jay looks around the yacht and finds a fragment of television screen glass, blood on trainers, a gun and bills for a children's psychiatric hospital in Switzerland. Jay shows all of this to Diane, who tells him not to go to the police as he will be suspected instead of Michael. She also warns him that Michael is capable of violence. This convinces Jay, and the two make love.

Later, a drunk Michael confronts Diane and accuses her of having sex with Jay. Diane only reveals that Jay has found evidence against him and is spying on them. At Lillian and Lettie's house, Jay tries to get rid of his fingerprints but is chased away by the murderer. The next day, Diane informs Jay that George is Lillian's cousin. Cynthia visits Michael's house to show him the photos of Diane's affair but is killed by the murderer, now dressed as Santa Claus. On campus, Diane sees Michael paying off George. Michael then accuses her of being the killer and conspiring against him and Jay to get the inheritance. Michael also breaks up with her, knowing of Diane's infidelity. Diane later visits Jay and tells him what happened. Jay and Diane then start having sex.

However, Michael appears there. Diane and Jay escape to the yacht, where he confesses his love for her. Michael tracks them down and prepares to shoot Jay but relents. The killer then appears and murders Michael. Diane and Jay chase him to the mansion. There, George confronts the killer, who is called Martin and has Huntington's chorea for which he is terminal. He is George and Lillian's illegitimate child and thus is able to inherit the fortune. George convinced the family to fly Martin from Switzerland so he could inherit the fortune instead of Michael and Diane. An angry and disillusioned Martin kills George, believing he only cares about the money.

Martin, who also murdered Michael, now plans to kill Diane. Defending her with the rifle, Jay kills Martin, who turns out to be 'Bird', his school friend and roommate.

Later Diane visits Jay at work and gifts him her car as a form of gratitude, having gotten the inheritance. She then invites Jay to come with her to Hawaii, he accepts and they leave together.

== Cast ==
- Sybil Danning as Dr. Diane Stevens, a sexy English literature professor at Ocean View Campus, California
- Eric Brown as Jay Richard, a young, smart undergrad student
- Beth Scheffell as Cynthia, Jay's girlfriend
- Paul Clemens as Martin "Bird" Johnson, Jay & Cynthia's friend
- Andrew Prine as Professor Michael Stevens, Senior Professor of Psychology and husband of Dr. Diane
- K.T. Stevens as Lillian Stevens, mother of Prof. Michael
- Margaret Wheeler as Lettie Stevens, grandmother of Prof. Michael
- Gene Bicknell as George Johnson, the gardener and handyman of the Stevens family
- Violet Manes as Jenny, maid of the Stevens family
- Alvy Moore as Jim "Jimbo", a gas station owner who employs Jay part time
- Dominick Brascia as Glenn, Jay & Cynthia's friend
- Greg Kaye as Dale, Jay & Cynthia's friend
- Suzanne Kennedy as Janice, Jay & Cynthia's friend
- Bill Conklin as Preacher
- Curt Ayers as The Bartender
- Terese Hanses as Pub Singer
- Joe Portaro as Professor
- Marlene Schmidt as Gas Station Customer

== Release ==
They're Playing with Fire premiered in Los Angeles on April 27, 1984. On its release, several reviews, including the Los Angeles Times and The Hollywood Reporter advised that the print advertisement was misleading as it suggested a “sex romp” opposed to a “horror-thriller.”
