= Scorchy =

1976 film by Howard Avedis

- Theatrical release poster
- Directed by: Howard Avedis
- Screenplay by: Howard Avedis
- Produced by: Howard Avedis
- Starring: Connie Stevens; Cesare Danova; William Smith
- Cinematography: László Pal
- Edited by: Bob Biggart; Roland Rolla; Pat Somerset
- Music by: Kendall Schmidt
- Production company: Hickmar Productions
- Distributed by: American International Pictures
- Release date: October 8, 1976
- Running time: 99 minutes
- Country: United States
- Language: English

Scorchy is a 1976 American crime film written and directed by Howard Avedis, and starring Connie Stevens, Cesare Danova, William Smith, Norman Burton, John Davis Chandler and Joyce Jameson. It was released on October 8, 1976 by American International Pictures.

== Plot ==
Jackie Parker is a federal narcotics agent based in Seattle who goes undercover to investigate Philip Bianco, a drug dealer.

== Cast ==
- Connie Stevens as Jackie Parker
- Cesare Danova as Philip Bianco
- William Smith as Carl Henrich
- Norman Burton as Chief Frank O'Brien
- John Davis Chandler as Nicky
- Joyce Jameson as Mary Davis
- Greg Evigan as Alan
- Nick Dimitri as Steve
- Nate Long as Charlie
- Ingrid Cedergren as Suzi
- Ellen Thurston as Maria
- Ray Sebastian as Counterman
- Mike Esky as Dimitri
- Gene White as Big Boy
- Marlene Schmidt as Claudia Bianco

== Reception ==
The New York Times was dismissive: "'Scorchy' is a stupid, brutal, horribly acted melodrama that is set in Seattle and stars Connie Stevens, who is pretty, though she looks like last year's Debbie Reynolds retread, as a narcotics detective. It was written, directed, and produced by Hikmet Avedis, which if it is a pseudonym, is the only indication of good sense connected with the movie.
