= Randy Boone =

American actor and singer (1942–2025)

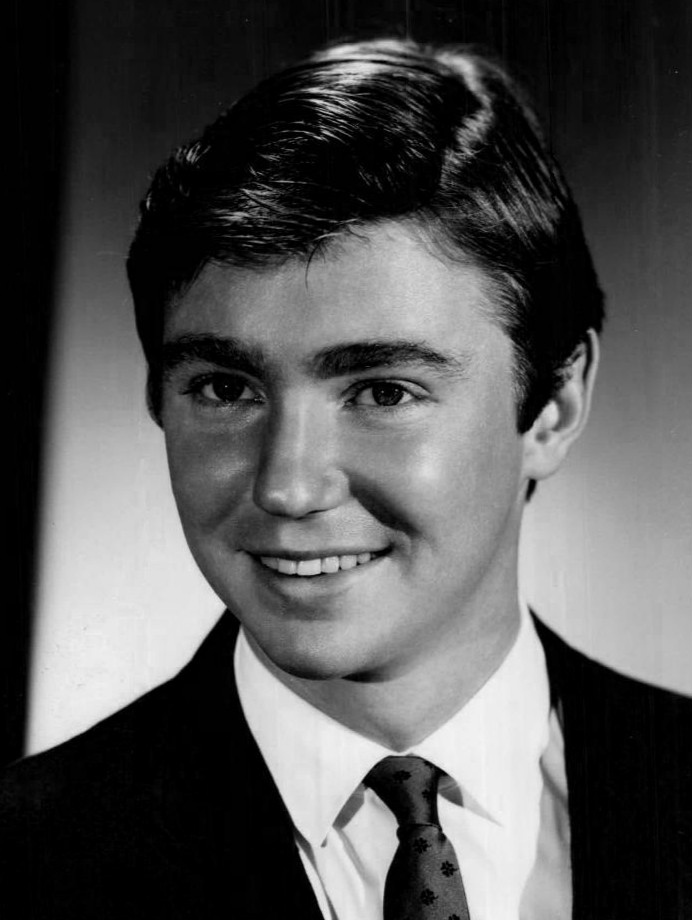
- Boone in 1967
- Born: Clyde Randy Boone; January 17, 1942; Fayetteville, North Carolina, U.S.
- Died: August 28, 2025 (aged 83); Massachusetts, U.S.
- Occupations: Actor; singer
- Years active: 1962–1987
- Spouse: Lana S. Redick

Clyde Randy Boone (January 17, 1942 – August 28, 2025) was an American actor and singer best known for his role in the series The Virginian as Randy Benton, a young ranch hand who played guitar and sang.

== Early life ==
Boone was born in Fayetteville, North Carolina on January 17, 1942. He enrolled at North Carolina State College as a mathematics major. He began performing as a folk singer at a bar and eventually dropped out of school to play guitar and sing. That decision led to 18 months of traveling around the United States, primarily by hitchhiking. He used his musical talents to barter, with his performances providing meals and sleeping quarters. He entered contests to win additional money.

== Career ==
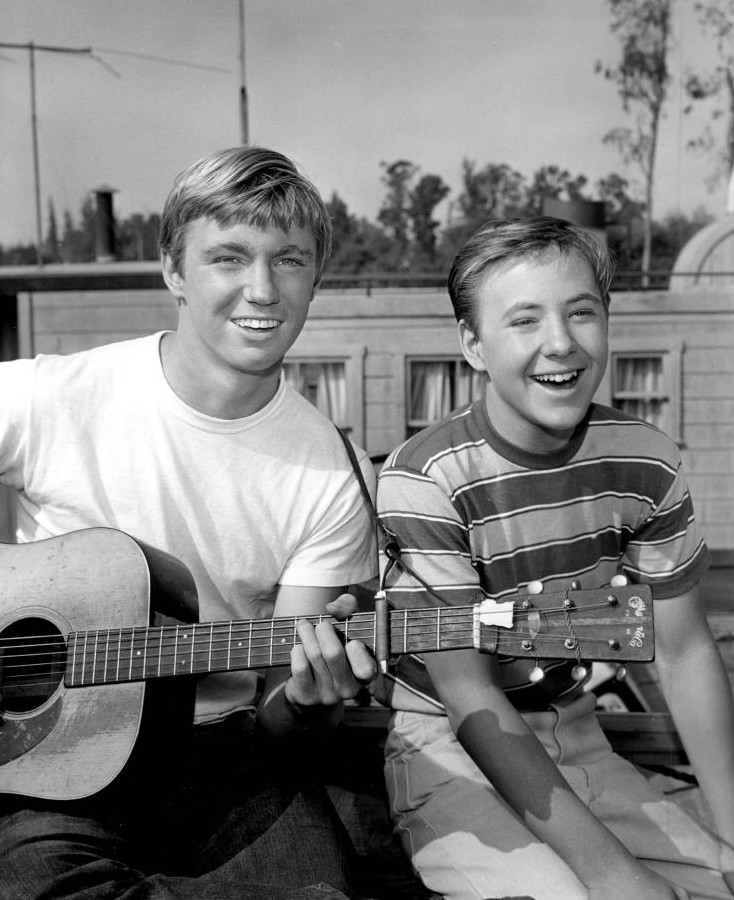
Boone and Michael Burns in "It's a Man's World"

Boone started his career in the 1962–1963 TV series It's a Man's World as Vern Hodges, a talented guitarist from Boone's native North Carolina.

Along with Fred Gerlach, The Sherwood Singers, Fred Thompson, The Willow Creek Ramblers, The Steeltown II, David & Michaela, LeSesne Hilton with John MacQuarrie, and The Calimbo Steel Band, Boone was booked to perform at Pasadena's 1st Annual Folk Festival which was held at 568 East Mount Curve Avenue, Altadena, Los Angeles County on 18 August 1963.

After playing guitar and singing in The Virginian and starring as a country singer in the 1966 film Country Boy, he played Francis Wilde in the Western series Cimarron Strip along with Stuart Whitman.

Boone had a role in the 1973 exploitation classic Terminal Island, a Stephanie Rothman directed film about people who are convicted of certain crimes get sent to an island penal colony that has no guards. The film also starred Don Marshall, Phyllis Davis, Ena Hartman, Tom Selleck and Roger E. Mosley.

== Death ==
Boone died on August 28, 2025 in Massachusetts, at the age of 83.

== Filmography (selection) ==
=== Film ===
- 1969: Backtrack!
- 1973: Terminal Island
- 1975: Dr. Minx
- 1987: The Wild Pair

=== Television ===
- 1962–1963: It's a Man's World
- 1963: The Alfred Hitchcock Hour (Season 1, episode 28: "Last Seen Wearing Blue Jeans") as Pete Tanner
- 1963: Amazing Stories
- 1963 Wagon Train, (2 episodes) Noah Bancroft, David Garner
- 1963 The Twilight Zone (Season 5, episode 10: "The 7th Is Made Up of Phantoms")
- 1964: The Fugitive
- 1964–1966: The Virginian
- 1966 Combat!
- 1966: Bonanza (Season 8, episode 10: "Ballad of the Ponderosa")
- 1967–1968: Cimarron Strip
- 1973: Emergency!
- 1974: Kolchak: The Night Stalker
- 1975: Kung Fu
- 1975: Gunsmoke
- 1985: Highway to Heaven
