= Prisoners (1982 film) =

- Directed by: Peter Werner
- Screenplay by: Meridith Baer; Hilary Henkin
- Story by: Meridith Baer
- Produced by: Antony I. Ginnane; John Barnett
- Starring: Tatum O'Neal; Colin Friels; Shirley Knight; David Hemmings; Bruno Lawrence; Ralph Cotterill
- Cinematography: James Glennon
- Edited by: Adrian Carr
- Music by: Peter Sullivan
- Production companies: FGH; Keith Barish Productions; Gupta Film Services
- Distributed by: 20th Century Fox
- Release date: 1982
- Running time: 95 minutes
- Countries: New Zealand; United States
- Language: English
- Budget: $NZD 4,288,719

Prisoners is a 1982 drama film directed by Peter Werner and starring Tatum O'Neal, Colin Friels and David Hemmings.

For unclear reasons, the film – a U.S.-New Zealand co-production – has never been released. The New Zealand Archive of Film, Television and Sound states that a financial dispute was allegedly the reason for the shelving of the completed film. According to New Zealand film historians Helen Martin and Sam Edwards, "One rumour has it that a relative of one of the actors bought the film to prevent its release."

== Plot ==
An American moves his family to New Zealand where he takes charge of a prison in Wellington. His young daughter begins to have a love affair with one of the prisoners in his charge.

== Cast ==
- Tatum O'Neal as Christie
- Colin Friels as Nick
- Shirley Knight as Virginia
- David Hemmings as Wilkens
- Bruno Lawrence as Peeky
- Ralph Cotterill as Holmby
- John Bach as Bodell
- Michael Hurst as Sciano
- Reg Ruka as Monkey
- Rob Jayne as Maslow
- Norman Fairley as Lewitt
- Peter Rowley as Hapstood
- Karl Bradley as Steel
- Richard Moss as Dunham
- Timothy Lee as Watts

== Production ==
The film was announced in March 1982. It was to be the first of four films made in New Zealand by 20th Century Fox. The deal for Prisoners was reportedly arranged by Fox executives Michael Nolin and John Davis, son of the new Fox owner, Marvin Davis.

The film was shot in Auckland from 29 June to 14 August 1982. Its budget was approximately $4.2 million.
