= The Sister-in-Law =

1974 film by Joseph Ruben

- Theatrical release poster
- Directed by: Joseph Ruben
- Written by: Joseph Ruben
- Produced by: Joseph Ruben; Jonathan Noah Krivine
- Starring: John Savage; Will McMillan; Anne Saxon
- Cinematography: Bruce G. Sparks
- Edited by: George Bowers
- Music by: John Savage
- Distributed by: Crown International Pictures
- Release date: 1974
- Running time: 85 minutes
- Country: United States
- Language: English

The Sister-in-Law is a 1974 soft core sexploitation drama film written and directed by Joseph Ruben. The plot centers around a hippie who is desired by his sister-in-law and mistaken for his underhanded brother after he returns to middle-class life. The film was his directorial debut starting his thirty year long career. The film was shot in JFK International Airport, Jamaica, Queens, New York City, USA.

The film received an R rating from the MPAA for soft nudity, soft sex scenes and some violence.

== Plot ==
Robert Strong, a singer-songwriter who has been traveling the country, makes a mistake when he goes to visit his brother, Edward, and gets involved with his bored sister-in-law, Joanna.

Robert and his brother's mistress, Deborah Holt, try to help his brother get away from working in drug smuggling.

It may or may not be a mistake, which turns out deadly.

== Principal cast ==
Actor	Role
John Savage	Robert Strong
Will McMillan	Edward Strong
Anne Saxon	Joanna Strong
Meridith Baer	Deborah Holt
Frank Scioscia	Benjo

Feature film debut of Anne Saxon, who plays the titular sister-in-law. This is also the only known film appearance by Ms. Saxon. There has been some speculation that she used an assumed name while making the film.

John Savage who starred as the principle lead in this film also provided much of the music. He wrote and performed three original songs for the film.

Michael Ruben: close family member of the film's director, writer, and producer Joseph Ruben appears as the young son of Edward and Joanna Strong.

== Home media ==
Like other films distributed by Crown International Pictures, The Sister-in-Law is readily available through VOD and often included in DVD collections of similar films from the 1970s such as The Pom Pom Girls and Blue Money, through Mill Creek Entertainment and other companies.

== See also ==
- List of American films of 1974
