= Unbecoming Age =

1992 film by Alfredo Ringel and Deborah Ringel

- The Magic Bubble DVD cover
- Directed by: Alfredo Ringel; Deborah Ringel
- Written by: Meridith Baer; Geof Prysirr
- Produced by: Alfredo Ringel; Deborah Ringel
- Starring: Diane Salinger; Colleen Camp; George Clooney
- Cinematography: Harry Mathias
- Edited by: Alan James Geik
- Music by: Jeff Lass
- Distributed by: Castle Hill Productions (theatrical); Monarch Video (home media)
- Release dates: July 1, 1992 (AFI Fest); March 26, 1993 (Limited theatrical)
- Running time: 92 minutes
- Country: United States
- Language: English

Unbecoming Age, also known as The Magic Bubble, is a 1992 American comedy film directed by Alfredo Ringel and Deborah Ringel and starring George Clooney and Diane Salinger. The film tells the story of woman who, for her 40th birthday, wishes to forget how old she is. A bottle of magic bubbles makes her wish come true, instantly transforming Julia into an ageless and happy woman.

== Cast ==
- Diane Salinger — Julia
- John Calvin — Charles
- Colleen Camp — Deborah
- Priscilla Pointer — Grandma
- George Clooney — Mac
- Shera Danese — Letty
- Nicholas Guest — Dooley
- Don Diamont — Alfredo

== Critical reception ==
On her The Movie Archive Review website, Marjorie Johns awarded the film a score of six out of ten, stating that the film's "fantasy elements work well" and concluding that "it's a sweet natured, unpretentious little movie and not Scorsese".

Film critic Todd McCarthy of Variety based his negative review of the film on the fact that "the fantasy element...is exasperatingly tame", claiming that the screenwriters "have kept their imaginations too inhibited and domesticated where greater flights of fancy would have been welcome". McCarthy did agree that his "sympathy goes out to Salinger" for her ability to "remain somewhat likable" and that a "number of talented thesps brighten up the supporting cast" even though "few will count this among their more stellar credits".

Critic Peter Rainer of Los Angeles Times summarized his opinion with the opening sentence of his review titled "Magic Bubbles Can't Help Un-Becoming". He stated: "The comic premise of Un-Becoming Age...doesn't make a whit of sense".
