= Meridith Baer =

American screenwriter

- Born: 1947 or 1948 (age 78–79); Los Angeles, U.S.
- Education: University of Colorado Boulder (BSc)
- Occupations: Entrepreneur, Businesswoman, Designer, Home Stager, Actress, Screenwriter, Model
- Years active: 1972–present
- Known for: Home staging
- Website: meridithbaer.com

Meridith Baer (born 1947 or 1948) is an American entrepreneur, businesswoman, and designer, best known for establishing the design and real estate practice of "home staging" and founding her own home staging firm in the United States, Meridith Baer Home. In 2013, HGTV premiered a television show about Baer and her firm titled Staged to Perfection.

== Early life ==
Baer graduated from the University of Colorado in Boulder with a degree in Journalism.

== Acting & Screenwriting ==
Prior to her graduation, Baer was approached on the University of Colorado campus by producer Jerry Bruckheimer who cast Baer in a Pepsi commercial. This ultimately launched Baer's prolific career in acting, in which she appeared in more than 100 television commercials, as well as being the face for Winston cigarettes, Kent cigarettes, and Benson & Hedges. At the same time, Baer continued to put her journalism degree to work writing articles like “The Passionate Shopper” for New York Magazine and for other publications including Penthouse and Viva.

In 1975, Baer moved to Los Angeles, where she continued to act in film and television, including appearances on popular programs including CHiPs, Eight is Enough and Happy Days. She also starred opposite Steven Guttenberg in The Chicken Chronicles. In 1981, she sold her first screenplay, Prisoners, for $250,000. A fictional love story about a teenage girl growing up on a prison reservation in the 1950s, the film was produced by 20th Century Fox and starred actress Tatum O’Neal. Baer's follow-up script, "Unbecoming Age", also released as The Magic Bubbles, was a comedy about a woman who has a mid-life crisis triggered by her turning 40 and features a young George Clooney in a supporting role.

== Meridith Baer Home ==
In 1998, Baer launched her business, Meridith Baer Home, after putting her furniture in a friend's spec home. After a couple of days on the market, the home sold for $500,000 above the asking price. Today, Meridith Baer Home offers home staging, interior design, and luxury home furniture leasing services from the company's offices in Los Angeles, New York, San Francisco, Connecticut and Florida. Meridith Baer holds 400,000 square feet of inventory in its warehouse facilities on the west and east coasts. The firm has designed projects in Arizona, California, Colorado, Connecticut, Florida, Georgia, Hawaii, Idaho, Illinois, Massachusetts, Nevada, New Jersey, New York, North Carolina, Texas, Utah, Virginia, Washington, D.C., and Cabo San Lucas.

Recognized as the world's number one home staging firm, Meridith Baer Home has provided its services to thousands of celebrities and business leaders including Bob Dylan, Bradley Cooper, Brad Pitt, Cindy Crawford, Geena Davis, Halle Berry, Harrison Ford, Janet Jackson, Jim Carrey, Jimmy Kimmel, Johnny Depp, Julia Roberts, Kylie Jenner, Madonna, Mark Wahlberg, Meryl Street, Michael B. Jordan, Pharrell Williams, Rande Gerber, Sharon Stone, Wiz Kalifa, and more. Projects have ranged from $700,000 bungalows to $200 million estates.

Meridith Baer Home has received many awards and recognitions, including the Best of Houzz awards, Houzz's Customer Service and Influencer awards, and Los Angeles Business Journal's list of 100 Fastest-Growing Private Companies. The firm has been featured in distinguished publications including Architectural Digest, ELLE Decor, Forbes, Los Angeles Times, The New York Times, and The Wall Street Journal. In 2024, the firm furnished more than $13.6 billion worth of real estate, covering over 8 million square feet.

== Meridith Baer Home on Television ==
After an appearance on the HGTV series "Selling L.A." Baer was approached by several networks about developing a television series about her home staging work. In 2013, she launched her own television show on HGTV titled Staged to Perfection. The show chronicled Baer and her team as she staged luxury properties.

In addition to Staged to Perfection, Meridith has been featured onscreen on the PBS series GardenFit, the CBS series Sunday Morning, and the NBC series Open House. Along with her on-screen appearances, Meridith has been a guest on famed podcasts including The Titans of Trade, Hope It Makes, and SLG Meetup.

== Philanthropy ==
Baer is deeply committed to philanthropy, focusing on housing for underserved families, education for future female leaders, and arts access to all. In addition, Meridith Baer Home has donated over 150 truckloads of furnishings to charitable initiatives aimed at assisting individuals and families in need.

Meridith Baer Home has also donated furnishing and support with philanthropic organizations including ArcSpace, The Broad Stage, No Kid Hungry, YWCA, Children’s Home, Exceptional Minds, Girls Inc., Habitat for Humanity, Hopics, Moving Families Forward, New Reach, NVCS, PATH, Penny Lane, The People Concern, A Sense of Home, St. Anne’s, Society of St. Vincent de Paul, Meals on Wheels, The Priority Center, Wheels for Humanity, Venice Community Housing, Wallis Annenberg Center for Performing Arts, and more.

In 2024, Meridith Baer Home was named a Finalist in the 2024 Los Angeles Business Journal Disruptors Award for Social Responsibility.

== Filmography ==
Year	Title	Role	Notes
1972	The Sister-in-Law	Deborah Holt	
1977	Prime Time a.k.a. American Raspberry	Switchboard Operator #2	
1977	The Chicken Chronicles	Tracy	
1978	Coach	Janet	
1981	Prisoners	-	Writer
1981	Private Lessons	Miss Phipps	
1992	Unbecoming Age	-	Writer

== Television ==
Year	Title	Role	Episodes
1978	CHiPs	Mindy	Flashback!
1978	Eight Is Enough	Janet	Fast and Loose
1978	The Next Step Beyond	Helen Chambers	Dream of Disaster
1979	Studs Lonigan	unknown	unknown
1984	Happy Days	Judy	Passages Part 1&2
