= The Chicken Chronicles =

1977 film directed by Frank Simon

- film poster
- Directed by: Frank Simon
- Written by: Paul Diamond
- Produced by: Walter Shenson; Melvin Simon (presenter)
- Starring: Phil Silvers; Ed Lauter; Steve Guttenberg
- Cinematography: Matthew F. Leonetti
- Edited by: George Folsey Jr.
- Music by: LeRoy Holmes; Ken Lauber
- Distributed by: AVCO Embassy Pictures
- Release date: October 1977
- Running time: 95 minutes
- Language: English
- Box office: $1,350,000

The Chicken Chronicles is a 1977 American teen comedy film set in 1969 and starring Steve Guttenberg.

== Plot ==
David Kessler is a high school student who will go to any lengths to impress a pretty cheerleader and lose his virginity, while juggling his job at a chicken restaurant and trying not to get thrown out of Beverly Hills High School — a fate that could get him sent to the Vietnam War.

== Cast ==
- Phil Silvers as Max Ober
- Ed Lauter as Vice Principal Nastase
- Steve Guttenberg as David Kessler
- Lisa Reeves as Margaret Shaffer
- Gino Baffa as Charlie Kessler
- Meridith Baer as Tracy Vogel
- Branscombe Richmond as Mark
- Jon Gries as Tom
- Raven De La Croix as Mrs. Worth

== Production ==
The film was based on a novel by Paul Diamond, the 23-year-old son of screenwriter I.A.L. Diamond. "It's a very funny very dirty book", said Diamond senior.

Film rights were sold to Paramount before publication. A screenplay was done by Ned Wynn in 1975 with Paul Monash the producer. The film was not made. However two years later Paul Diamond was working on a script for Avco Embassy.

It was the first lead role for Steve Guttenberg. "Some actors get embarrassed about their early work", Guttenberg said, "but we all don't start out as 'artistes.' Nobody is going to confuse "Chicken" with 'Citizen Kane' but I learned a lot. They took a chance with me. I didn't get rich on it but it was a start."
