= Marlene Schmidt =

German actress, TV host and beauty queen (born 1937)

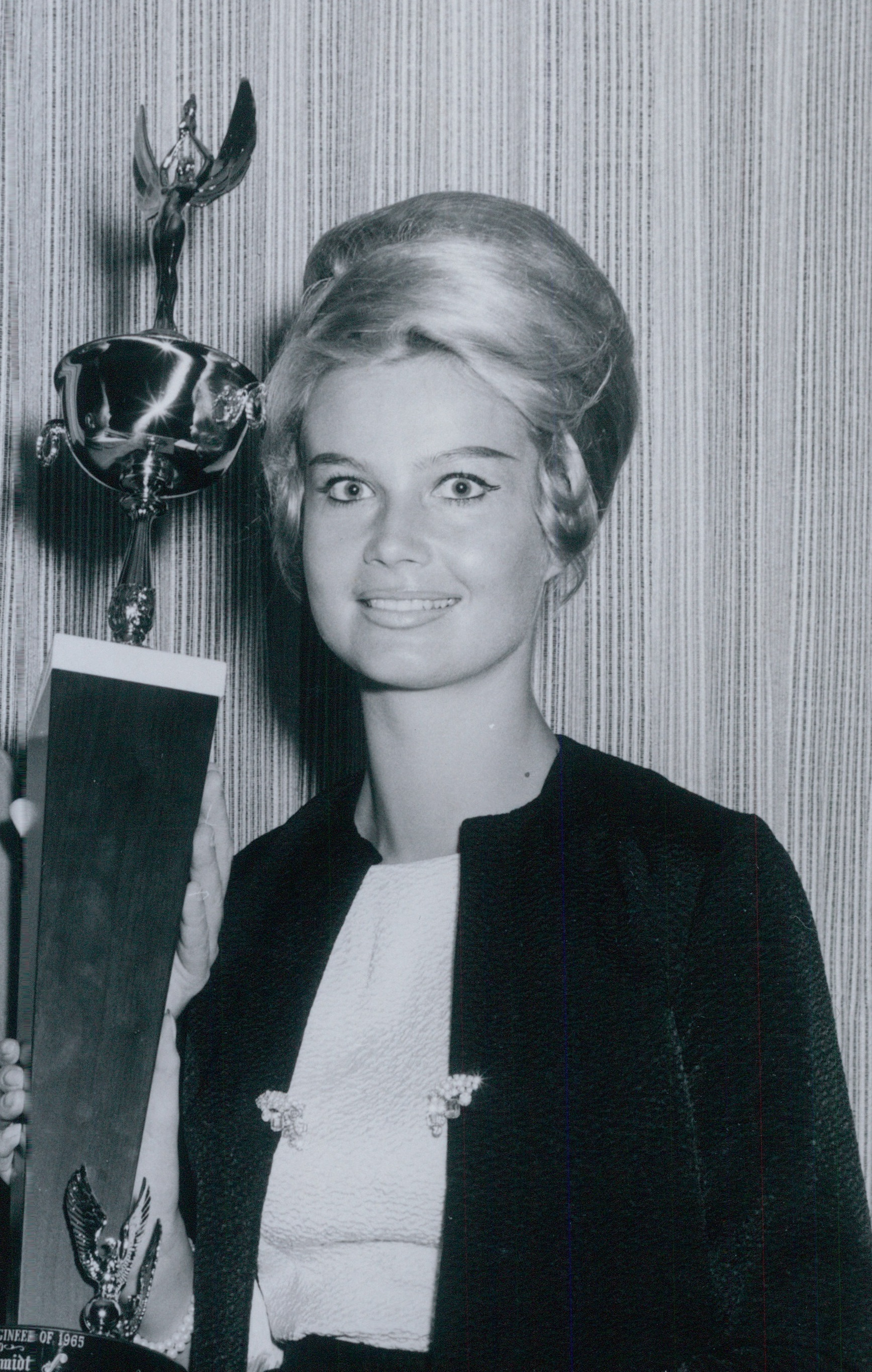
- 1965 ASME award
- Born: 11 November 1937 (age 89); Breslau, Germany
- Height: 5 ft 8 in (1.73 m)
- Beauty pageant titleholder
- Title: Miss Germany 1961; Miss Universe 1961
- Major competitions: Miss Germany 1961 (Winner); Miss Universe 1961 (Winner)

Marlene Schmidt (born 11 November 1937) is a German control engineer, actress, television host, and beauty queen who won Miss Universe 1961.

== Life ==
Born in Breslau, Germany and raised in East Germany, where she earned a master's degree in engineering. In 1960, she and her family fled to Stuttgart in West Germany, where she got a job as an electronics engineer. In 1961, she entered the state pageant of Baden-Württemberg in the hope of winning the car that was offered as a prize. From there, she went on to represent her state in the national pageant in Baden-Baden, where she was crowned Miss Germany in 1961. She then went on to win the Miss Universe pageant against 47 other participants. She was at that time the tenth consecutive German entrant to reach the semifinals of the event (then a record) and is the first (and to date only) German to be crowned Miss Universe.

In 1962, Schmidt became the third of eight wives of the American actor Ty Hardin. They settled in the United States. The marriage lasted until 1966. They had one daughter, Schmidt's only child.

She continued her engineering career for a while, and in 1967 was a technical consultant for Sier-Bath Gear Co, New Jersey.

From 1972 to 1986, Schmidt was involved in the movie industry, where she acquired credits as an actress, producer and writer in eleven productions. None of the films achieved particular merit for plot or other production values apart from generally offering a liberal dose of female nudity, albeit the 1972 skin-fest The Stepmother distinguished itself by receiving an Oscar nomination for its musical score.

Eventually Schmidt returned to Germany, where she lives in Saarbrücken.

== Filmography ==
Marlene Schmidt was involved in the following movies as actress and producer:

- 1968: Red Plain
- 1969: Goodbye Lebanon
- 1972: The Stepmother ¹
- 1974: The Teacher ¹
- 1975: The Specialist ²
- 1975: Dr. Minx ¹
- 1976: Scorchy ¹
- 1978: Texas Detour ¹
- 1978: The Fifth Floor ²
- 1981: Separate Ways ²
- 1983: Mortuary ¹
- 1984: They're Playing with Fire ²
- 1986: Kidnapped ¹

¹ actress and producer
² additional writing credit

Awards and achievements
Preceded by (United States) Linda Bement	Miss Universe; 1961	Succeeded by (Argentina) Norma Nolan
