= The Stepmother (1972 film) =

- Directed by: Howard L. Avedis
- Screenplay by: Howard L. Avedis
- Produced by: Howard L. Avedis
- Starring: Alejandro Rey; John Anderson; Katherine Justice; Larry Linville; Marlene Schmidt; Claudia Jennings
- Cinematography: Jack Beckett
- Edited by: Ralph J. Hall; Tony De Zarraga
- Music by: Audrey Granville
- Production company: Crown International Pictures
- Release date: March 1972
- Running time: 94 minutes
- Country: United States
- Language: English

≤

The Stepmother is a 1972 American erotic thriller exploitation film directed and produced by Howard L. Avedis and released theatrically in the U.S. by Crown International Pictures. It stars Alejandro Rey as an architect who murders a client he suspects is having an affair with his wife.

== Plot ==
Margo Delgado (Katherine Justice) seduces her stepson, Steve Delgado (Rudy Herrera Jr.), while murder and other complications arise.

== Cast ==
- Alejandro Rey as Frank Delgado
- John Anderson as Inspector Darnezi
- Katherine Justice as Margo Delgado
- David Garfield as Goof (John D. Garfield)
- Larry Linville as Dick Hill
- Marlene Schmidt as Sonya Hill
- David Renard as Pedro Lopez
- Claudia Jennings as Rita
- Rudy Herrera Jr. as Steve Delgado
- Priscilla Garcia as Maria

== Production ==
Crown International Pictures changed the name of the film from Impulsion to The Stepmother.

=== Music ===
Sheet music and lyrics for ″Strange Are the Ways of Love″ by Sammy Fain and Paul Francis Webster.

== Critical response ==
=== Reception ===
Leonard Maltin, writing in Leonard Maltin's Movie Guide, gave the film one-and-a-half-stars, commenting that, "Rey is okay as anti-hero of this cheapie murder-suspenser in the Hitchcock mold." Timothy Shary wrote in Teen Movies: A Century of American Youth that teen culture of the 1970s indulged on underage sex with taboo tales. Noel Murray of The A.V. Club wrote, "The Stepmother turns into a middle-aged beach-party movie for a while".

=== Awards ===
Composer Sammy Fain and lyricist Paul Francis Webster were nominated for the Academy Award for Best Original Song for ″Strange Are the Ways of Love″ at the 47th Academy Awards.

== See also ==
- List of American films of 1972
