= 5 Card Stud =

1968 film by Henry Hathaway

- US film poster
- Directed by: Henry Hathaway
- Written by: Marguerite Roberts
- Produced by: Hall Wallis
- Starring: Dean Martin; Robert Mitchum; Inger Stevens; Roddy McDowall; Katherine Justice; Yaphet Kotto
- Cinematography: Daniel L. Fapp
- Edited by: Warren Low
- Music by: Maurice Jarre
- Distributed by: Paramount Pictures
- Release dates: July 12, 1968 (Chicago); July 31, 1968 (New York City); August 14, 1968 (Los Angeles)
- Running time: 103 minutes
- Country: United States
- Language: English
- Box office: $3.5 million (US/Canada)

5 Card Stud is a 1968 American Western mystery film, directed by Henry Hathaway and starring Dean Martin and Robert Mitchum. The script is based on a novel by Ray Gaulden and was written by Marguerite Roberts, who also wrote the screenplay of True Grit for Hathaway the following year.

== Plot ==
In 1880, an unknown drifter and gambler in the small town of Rincon, 100 miles (161 km) from Denver, Colorado, is caught cheating at a five-card stud poker game. The players, led by the volatile Nick Evers, take the cheating gambler to lynch him. One of the players, Van Morgan, tries to prevent the others from administering frontier justice, but is unable to stop the hanging. Morgan leaves town, but later returns, when he hears that several of the other players from the poker game have become victims of grisly murders. Morgan starts a relationship with Lily, the barbershop owner.

The town has a new resident, a stern and somewhat edgy Colt .45-carrying Baptist preacher, named Reverend Rudd. As more members of the lynch mob are killed off one by one by strangling, it becomes clear that someone is taking revenge, and it is up to Morgan to solve the mystery. Nick is shown to be the one telling Rudd who was at the game and involved in killing the stranger, who is Rudd's brother. Nick tells Rudd falsely that George was involved, Rudd kills George. As George is dying he puts his hands together like he is praying, Morgan knows that George never prayed, and realizes that Rudd is the murderer. Nick confronts Rudd, intending to kill him and then Morgan, but Rudd pulls a hidden derringer and shoots him. Morgan seeks out and kills Rudd in a shootout. Morgan leaves town, riding off to Denver, with Lily planning to follow him in a week.

== Cast ==
- Dean Martin as Van Morgan
- Robert Mitchum as Reverend Jonathan Rudd
- Inger Stevens as Lily Langford
- Roddy McDowall as Nick Evers
- Katherine Justice as Nora Evers
- John Anderson as U.S. Marshal Al Dana
- Ruth Springford as Mama Malone
- Yaphet Kotto as George "Little George"
- Denver Pyle as Sig Evers
- Bill Fletcher as Joe Hurley
- Whit Bissell as Dr. Cooper
- Ted de Corsia as Eldon Bates
- Don Collier as Rowan
- Roy Jenson as Mace Jones
- Bob Hoy as Deputy Marshal

== Production ==
5 Card Stud was shot in Mexico and filming wrapped in May 1968.

The song led by Reverend Rudd at his first service in Rincon is "Mercy's Call," a late-19th-century Baptist hymn written by W.H. Doane.

This film marked one of the final appearances of Inger Stevens, and the second time that Mitchum played an unorthodox preacher (following 1955's The Night of the Hunter). 5 Card Stud brought together director Henry Hathaway and Dean Martin for a second time; the first was the 1965 film The Sons of Katie Elder starring John Wayne.

== Reception ==
In a contemporary review for The New York Times, critic Vincent Canby identified 5 Card Stud as one of a recent spate of "Buddy System" Westerns, such as: El Dorado (1966) with John Wayne and Mitchum; The Way West (1967) with Kirk Douglas, Mitchum and Richard Widmark; The War Wagon (1967) with John Wayne and Kirk Douglas; Bandolero! (1968) with James Stewart and Dean Martin; and Villa Rides (1968) with Yul Brynner, Mitchum and Charles Bronson. Canby wrote: "Without important exception, all of these titles, stories and settings are interchangeable, to say nothing of the stars, some of whom are beginning to look as if they'd been hatched from dinosaur eggs. ... Buddy System Westerns are somehow basically soft."

In the Chicago Sun-Times, critic Roger Ebert wrote: "'Five Card Stud' is not a great movie, but it's a polished, professional one, and it's a good deal more than a common Western. ... But, it also has something rather rare, a well-made story. Most action Westerns are directed by rote: good guy, bad guy, a standard pattern of fights, an eventual triumph for the gentleman in the white hat. Not this one, which presents a suspense story in a Western setting."
