= The Crater Lake Monster =

- Theatrical release poster
- Directed by: William R. Stromberg
- Written by: William R. Stromberg; Richard Cardella
- Starring: Richard Cardella; Glen Roberts; Mark Siegel
- Cinematography: Paul Gentry
- Edited by: Nancy Grossman; Steven Nielson
- Music by: Will Zens (uncredited)
- Distributed by: Crown International Pictures
- Release date: December 17, 1977
- Running time: 85 minutes
- Country: United States
- Language: English
- Budget: <$200,000
- Box office: $1,050,000

The Crater Lake Monster is a 1977 B horror movie directed by William R. Stromberg for Crown International Pictures, and featuring Richard Cardella.

The story involves a plesiosaur which was apparently long dormant in Crater Lake in Northern California, near Susanville (at 40.625°N 121.047°W; not to be confused with the much more famous Crater Lake in Oregon), but is revived when meteorite falls into the lake. As people are attacked by the monster, the Sheriff (Cardella) investigates.

== Plot ==
In Crater Lake, Northern California, Dr. Richard Calkins is informed by his colleague Dan Turner that he and his girlfriend Susan Patterson have made an incredible discovery in a nearby cave system. The three go down and Calkins is shown a system of cave drawings, including what appears to be a depiction of people fighting a Plesiosaurus, thus providing evidence that dinosaurs existed at the same time as humans did. However, a flaming meteorite crashes into the lake just overhead, resulting in a cave-in that destroys the cave system and the drawings, while the three scientists are barely able to escape alive. The local sheriff, Steve Hanson, sees the meteorite crash and radios about the incident before continuing his patrol.

Several months later, Sheriff Hanson meets with the three scientists to search for the meteorite. Turner and Patterson dive down to the bottom of the lake, only to find out that the meteorite is still too hot to recover and has resulted in the entire lake becoming significantly warmer than before, increasing to approximately ninety degrees. Somewhere else on the lake, a birdwatcher is setting up his equipment when a plesiosaurus suddenly rises out of the water, moves onto the shore, and kills him.

Two friends, Arnie Chabot and Mitch Kowalski, running low on money, decide to start a boat rental service. Their first customer is U.S. senator Jack Fuller, who rents a rowboat for a quick fishing trip for $20. However, he is attacked and killed by the monster. Arnie and Mitch see the empty boat drifting in the middle of the lake and go out to retrieve it, finding only some large blood stains inside the boat. They bring the boat back to shore as evidence for the Sheriff. Then the sheriff finds many dead animals, and begins investigating.

Some time later, a performer named Ross Conway and his wife Paula are on their way to a show when their car suddenly begins to malfunction. They stop at a gas station and learn from the mechanic that their car won't be repaired for several more days. The attendant advises them to rent a boat for a while. The couple go to Arnie and Mitch's dock to rent a motorboat for $25 and head out. While out on the lake, they are attacked by the plesiosaurus, but manage to outrun it due to the boat's motor and run it aground. When the monster pursues them onto the shore, Ross dumps gasoline into the boat and sets it afire, fending off the monster.

Arnie and Mitch, as they walk away from renting the boat to the couple, begin to argue about their boat-renting service. Mitch claims that he is tired of being bossed around by Arnie, and the two eventually fight. Their scuffle leads to the water, where the two discover the severed head of Fuller floating in the lake just as the Sheriff arrives. As he takes in the head for evidence, he orders them to stay away from the lake, and to not use any more boats. Realizing that the couple from earlier is still out there, Arnie and Mitch go out in another boat to search for them. They eventually discover the charred remains of the motorboat and the distraught couple, both too dazed to explain what happened to them. The couple is taken away in an ambulance, and the Sheriff issues a stern warning for Arnie and Mitch to not go back out onto the lake.

At the local diner, the sheriff sees a man who is wanted for armed robbery in the nearest town. During the crime, the clerk and a female customer were killed. The sheriff pursues the suspect into the forest. After the suspect drives his car off a cliff and jumps out, the sheriff pursues him on foot. The chase eventually leads them down to the shore, where the Sheriff shoots the suspect in the knee, before stopping to hide behind a tree and reload his weapon. During the brief pause, the monster snatches the suspect, dragging him under the water. The sheriff does not hear the attack happen, but he discovers a large blood stain on a nearby rock. Meanwhile, Calkins's autopsy report is done, and the coroner notifies the sheriff that the wounds were caused by an animal's teeth and that the attacking animal is not only of a significant size, but also lives in the lake.

When the sheriff returns the next day to the location where the robbery suspect went missing, he finds several massive footprints before the monster suddenly emerges. He shoots all six shots in his revolver at it, before jumping into his car and driving away. He tells Calkins, Turner, and Patterson about the incident, and his description of the monster fits that of a plesiosaurus. While the three scientists are excited at the idea of a living prehistoric animal in the lake, the sheriff is determined to kill it before more lives are put at risk.

The sheriff, Calkins, Turner, and Patterson host a town meeting in the diner the next day, informing the town of the danger and what they plan to do to stop the monster. Arnie and Mitch ultimately take the scientists' side in favor of keeping the monster alive, saying it'll bring in a significant amount of money for the town. However, a man named Ferguson is attacked by the monster and barely manages to make it to safety inside the diner. The Sheriff, Turner, Patterson, Arnie, and Mitch all go outside to confront the monster, which is just near some farming vehicles and a wall of hay bales. The Sheriff starts a bulldozer, but Arnie attempts to stop him at gunpoint, saying that the monster must live. The Sheriff convinces him that nothing will stop the monster without killing it, and Arnie jumps in the back, shotgun ready. As the monster draws closer, Arnie panics and attempts to flee, only to be caught and killed by the monster. The Sheriff slams into the monster with the bulldozer, causing it to drop Arnie's corpse. When it reaches its head down to try to pick up Arnie's body again, the Sheriff drives the bulldozer forward and repeatedly slams into the monster's neck, finally killing it.

After the battle, the Sheriff, Calkins, Turner, Patterson, and Mitch all mourn Arnie's death, with Mitch vowing to continue the boat rental service that he and Arnie started, softly repeating "our boats...our boats."

== Cast ==
- Richard Cardella as Sheriff Steve Hanson
- Glenn Roberts as Arnie Chabot
- Mark Siegel as Mitch Kowalski
- Bob Hyman as Richard Calkins
- Richard Garrison as Dan Turner
- Kacey Cobb as Susan Patterson
- Michael Hoover as Ross Conway
- Suzanne Lewis as Paula Conway
- Marv Eliot as Senator Jack Fuller
- Garry Johnston as Blackmailer
- Susy Claycomb as waitress
- Jim Goeppinger as Villager

== Production ==
William R. Stromberg had worked with stop motion, assisting Art Clokey with episodes of Davey and Goliath as well as doing commercial work. Stromberg collaborated with longtime friend Richard Cardella on a monster movie that was written in the same style as 1950s monster movies. Initially the two had planned to do a movie inspired by Bigfoot, but after a glut of similar movies the two decided to make a monster inspired by dinosaurs instead. Stromberg brought another friend, David W. Allen who specialized in stop motion, to design the monster as Stromberg didn't think alternatives such as a man in a suit would be sufficient.

The movie suffered from financing and publication problems with Crown International, as Cardella recounts:

Crown International was part of the financing and they just screwed up everything. They pulled their support for some key scenes (that would have explained a lot and plugged some of the obvious holes), added a canned score that really sucked, and turned it over to some hack to edit. The asshole didn't even use a fade or dissolve in the whole freakin' picture!

Crown assumed greater control of the movie, deleting expository scenes that would have added to the plot. Stromberg voiced his disapproval of the editing decisions by Crown that he was not privy to, which made the passage of time confusing and damaged the movie's pacing.

There was no post work done on the film resulting in day for night scenes being simply daytime.

The stop-motion effects were created by Phil Tippett, who was also working concurrently on Star Wars.

Parts of the movie were filmed on location at Huntington Lake, California, and Palomar Mountain, California.

== Reception ==
George R. Reis from DVD Drive-In termed it "one of the worst giant monster flicks of all time". Buzz McClain from Allmovie wrote, "With virtually no budget (not even for a competent tripod to hold the camera steady) and using amateur actors, the movie employs the most laughable devices to render the impression of a raging dinosaur—an immobile rubber head, for instance—and the most unpredictable shuffling of scenes of tension and humor." Andrew Smith from Popcorn Pictures gave the movie a score of 1 out of 10, writing, "The Crater Lake Monster is nearly as bad as its reputation claims, but the brief stop motion special effects are worth one look... It's just a shame that these effects are wasted in this hokey micro budget film, and are not displayed in something bigger budgeted and more professional." Keith Bailey from Radio Times gave it 1/5 stars, terming it "so slow and shoddy, it makes some of the worst 1950s monster movies look like masterpieces".

== See also ==
- List of stop motion films
- List of monster movies
