= Lynn Hamilton (actress) =

American actress (1930–2025)

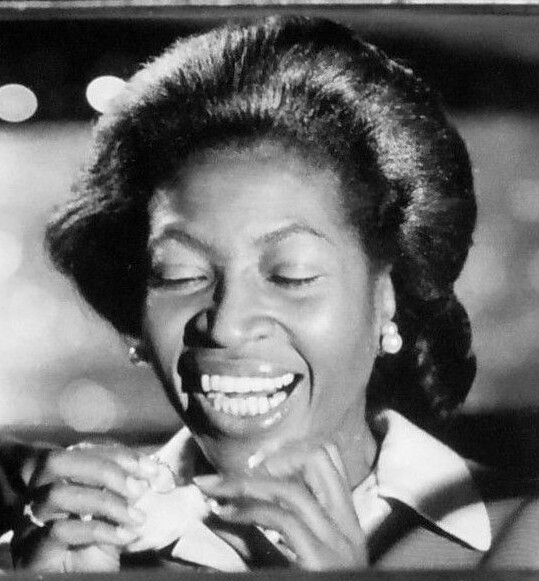
- Hamilton in a 1972 publicity photo for Sanford and Son
- Born: Alzenia Lynn Hamilton; April 25, 1930; Yazoo City, Mississippi, U.S.
- Died: June 19, 2025 (aged 95); Chicago, Illinois, U.S.
- Occupation: Actress
- Years active: 1958–2009
- Notable work: Donna Harris – Sanford and Son; Verdie Grant Foster – The Waltons
- Spouse: Frank S. Jenkins (m. 1964; died 2014)
- Children: 1

Alzenia Lynn Hamilton (April 25, 1930 – June 19, 2025) was an American actress. She was best known for her recurring roles as Donna Harris, Fred Sanford's girlfriend and later fiancée on the sitcom Sanford and Son (1972–1977) and Verdie Grant Foster on The Waltons (1973–1981). She also portrayed cousin Georgia Anderson in Roots: The Next Generations.

== Early life ==
Alzenia Lynn Hamilton was born in Yazoo City, Mississippi on April 25, 1930, to Nancy and Louis Hamilton and moved to Chicago Heights, Illinois, when she was twelve years old. She attended Bloom High School. She studied acting at Goodman Theatre.

== Career ==
Hamilton began her career in community theatre in Chicago and debuted on Broadway in Only in America in 1959. She appeared in three other Broadway plays, many Off-Broadway plays and spent three years with the New York Shakespeare Festival.

After an initial appearance in the seventh episode of the series as a landlady, Hamilton starred as Fred Sanford's girlfriend and on again/off again fiancée Donna Harris on the television sitcom Sanford and Son. Donna was a nurse and sometimes took care of Fred. Donna was considered to be Hamilton's most popular role. When the show returned in 1980 under a reworked title Sanford, Hamilton was not asked to return, and her character was written out of the series. There are many internet claims that she was the younger sister of actress LaWanda Page, who portrayed Esther Anderson on Sanford and Son, confirmed only via LaWanda Page's obituary in the Los Angeles Times. However, they are neither related nor sisters, though they became good friends.

In addition to Hamilton's role on Sanford and Son, she also had a recurring role as Verdie Grant Foster on The Waltons, Verdie was a neighbor of the Walton family. First appearing on The Waltons in 1973, Hamilton would afterwards make multiple additional appearances as Verdie Foster through 1981.

Hamilton made numerous appearances in television sitcoms, soap operas and miniseries such as Good Times, 227, Dangerous Women, Generations, Port Charles, The Golden Girls, Gunsmoke (guest starring as ”Mother Tabitha” in the 1969 episode “The Sisters” (S15E14), and Roots: The Next Generations. Hamilton also appeared in the show Barnaby Jones, playing a character named Laura Padget, in an episode titled "Sunday: Doomsday" on February 4, 1973. She appeared on the detective series Mannix in the season 3 episode 13 as the wife of a police detective who hires Mannix to save her son. Hamilton also had a recurring role as Judge Fulton on The Practice, and also appeared as Captain Dobey's wife, Edith Dobey, in the Starsky & Hutch episode Captain Dobey, You're Dead!.

== Personal life and death ==
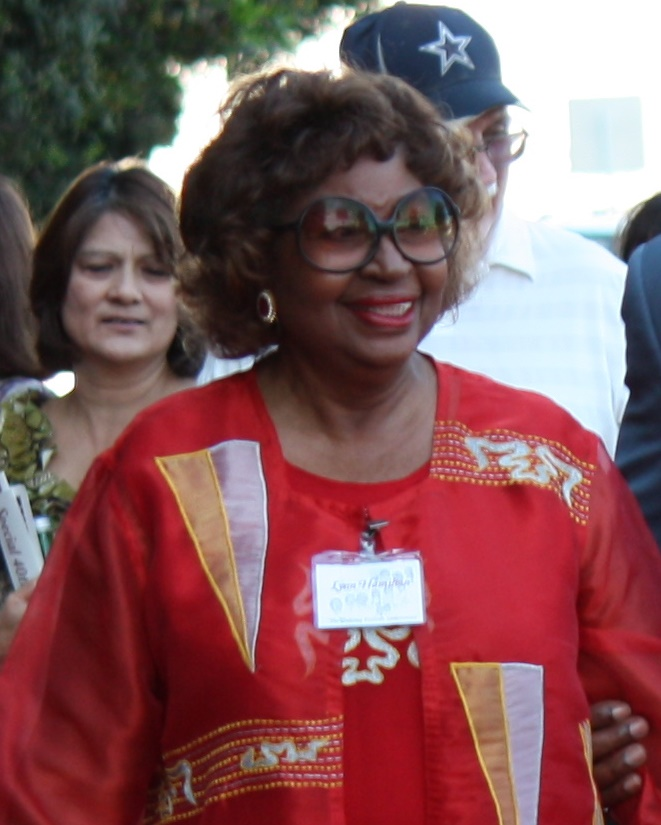
Hamilton in 2012

Hamilton was married to poet and playwright Frank Jenkins for 49 years, from November 1964 until his death in August 2014. LaWanda Page, who costarred with Hamilton on Sanford and Son, had a younger sister coincidentally also named "Lynn Hamilton". This caused a rumor that the two actresses were sisters. Series lead Demond Wilson confirmed the rumor to be false in 2016.

Hamilton died at her home in Chicago, on June 19, 2025, at the age of 95.

== Filmography ==
Year	Title	Role	Notes
1958	Shadows	Girl at Party	
1960	The New Girl	Miss Thompson (Secretary)	Short film
1971	Brother John	Sarah	
1971	The Seven Minutes	Avis	
1971	Hawaii Five O	Mae (bar owner)	
1972	Buck and the Preacher	Sarah	
1972	Lady Sings the Blues	Aunt Ida	
1972–1977	Sanford and Son	Donna Harris	Recurring role
1973–1981	The Waltons	Verdie Foster	Recurring role
1974	Hangup	Mrs. Ramsey	
1975	Starsky & Hutch	Edith Dobey	
1976	Leadbelly	Sally Ledbetter	
1984	The Jesse Owens Story	Mamma Solomon	TV movie
1986–1989	227	Emma Johnson	Recurring role
1986	Legal Eagles	Doreen	
1991–1992	Dangerous Women	Cissie Johnson	Main role
1989–1991	Generations	Vivian Potter	Main role
1993	The Vanishing	Miss Carmichael	
1997–2002	The Practice	Judge P. Fulton	Recurring role
1998	Moesha	Ruth Mitchell	1 episode
2003	Beah: A Black Woman Speaks	Dr. Oberholser	
