= Dangerous Women (American TV series) =

1991 American soap opera

- Genre: Soap opera
- Created by: Reg Watson
- Written by: Scott K. Anderson; Lois Booton; Roccin Chatfield; AJ Nathan; Cindy Prial; Thom Racina; Betsy Snyder; Reg Watson
- Directed by: Joseph Behar; Anthony Morina; Dennis Steinmetz
- Starring: Valerie Wildman; Katherine Justice; Lynn Hamilton; Melanie Vincz; Maria Rangel; Kelli Vanlondersele
- Composers: Marc Ellis; Ray Ellis
- Country of origin: United States
- Original language: English
- No. of seasons: 1
- No. of episodes: 52

Production
- Executive producers: Peter Pinnie; Reg Watson
- Producers: Fran Calderone; Bob Crystal
- Editor: Leigh Anne Branch
- Running time: 45–48 minutes
- Production company: Central Independent Television

Original release
- Network: Syndicated
- Release: August 7, 1991 – January 1, 1992

Dangerous Women is a syndicated nighttime American soap opera about a group of women who served time in prison together. It was created and written by Reg Watson and produced by Reg Grundy Productions.

== Synopsis ==
Dangerous Women was loosely based on the 1979 Australian series Prisoner which had enjoyed success in syndication on many networks around the US from late 1979 to around mid 1982. With both series created by Reg Watson, Dangerous Women initially shared many similarities with its Australian counterpart, although this became far less apparent as the series continued.

The characters in Dangerous Women were based on the original characters of Prisoner: The characters of Karen Travers and Lynne Warner from the latter became Maria Trent and Holly Warner in Dangerous Women and both of their opening storylines were based on those originally shown in Prisoner. Similarly, Rita Jones's personality was based on Bea Smith, Crystal Fox shared the characteristics of nymphomaniac Marilyn Mason, and Cissie Johnson was based on the character 'Mum' Brooks - Cissie's daughter rejected her just as Mum's daughter disowned her when she was released in Prisoner.

Although many characters and storylines were clearly borrowed from Prisoner, the main character who tied the show together was Faith Cronin (Valerie Wildman), a mobster's wife. This character and storyline was unique and created especially for the new version of the series. Faith had been seriously disfigured by her mobster husband, and on leaving prison, she framed her ex-husband for murder after she staged her own death. Faith then had plastic surgery and created a new identity, becoming the confident and glamorous Patricia Meadows. She bought a lakefront inn, The Cedar Lake Inn, a destination she'd loved as a child and somewhere she'd always dreamed of living once she was released from prison - only to find her past catching up with her when one by one, her fellow former convicts converge on the Cedar Lake area as they are released from prison.

As the series progressed, the prison angle was gradually phased out as all of the characters had been released. They eventually took refuge at the Inn and attempted to rebuild their lives together.

== Cast ==
- Valerie Wildman as Patricia Meadows/Faith Cronin
- Lynn Hamilton as Cissie Johnson
- Katherine Justice as Rita Jones/Roxy Lawrence
- Kelli Van Londersele as Holly Warner
- Maria Rangel as Maria Trent
- Melanie Vincz as Crystal Fox
- Anthony Addabbo as Michael Torres
- Mark McCoy as Joe Holland
- Ed Monaghan as Jerry Vernon
- Fred Mancuso as Randy Carter
- Casper Van Dien as Brad Morris
- Kansas Long as Ricky Robbins
- Kelly Read as Debbie Jones
- Stephen Liska as Jack Fisher
- Louise Fitch as Minnie Wells
- Susan Powell as Warden Grayson
- Mary Barbara Alexander as Karen Holland
- Kat Sawyer as Kath Morris
- Paul Carr as Ben Cronin

== Airings and cancelation ==
Dangerous Women premiered August 7, 1991 and aired only one season. The show was syndicated on a limited basis, mainly among the stations of United Television – WWOR-TV in New York City, KMSP-TV in Minneapolis–Saint Paul, WPWR-TV in Chicago (not owned by United) and KCOP in Los Angeles were known to have carried the program. WDCA in Washington, D.C. carried the program but soon relegated it to a 2 AM time slot. In some markets, two one-hour episodes aired back to back every Wednesday night with encores on Saturday nights. It had reasonable ratings in New York, but it wasn't enough to keep the show going. It was pulled from syndication on January 1, 1992, after 52 episodes.

Several weeks before the show was officially canceled, all six lead actresses appeared on The Richard Bey Show, a talk show that originated from WWOR. The cast also appeared on two episodes of NY At Night, a primetime talk show on WWOR starring entertainer Clint Holmes. These appearances were their last attempt to keep the show on the air.

== UK transmission ==
Shortly after its American cancellation, the show was broadcast on Central Television – the ITV franchise for the United Kingdom's English Midlands. It aired on Sunday and Monday nights from March 1992 replacing Prisoner in the schedule (which had finished December the previous year). All 52 episodes aired. No other ITV regions broadcast the series. The show was also later aired twice by cable TV station Living, in a late-night time-slot and repeated weekdays.
