= Harvey Jason =

English actor (born 1940)

- Born: Harvey Paul Jason; 29 February 1940 (age 86); London, England, UK
- Occupations: Actor, businessman
- Years active: 1964–2004
- Spouse: Pamela Franklin (m. 1970)
- Children: 2

Harvey Paul Jason (born 29 February 1940) is an English former actor and the co-owner of Mystery Pier Books, an independent book store that sells first editions.

== Career ==
A character actor in films including Save the Tiger, Oklahoma Crude, The Gumball Rally and The Lost World: Jurassic Park, he also played in dozens of TV roles in the 1970s and 1980s, including Pinky in Rich Man, Poor Man and Harry Zief in Captains and the Kings, both made in 1976.

== Personal life ==
Jason was born in London, the son of Marie Goldblatt and actor Alec Jason.

He is married to actress Pamela Franklin, whom he met in 1970 while making the film Necromancy, and with whom he has two sons. He is the proprietor of Mystery Pier Books in West Hollywood, California, which he operates with his son, Louis. They opened their shop and started listing on AbeBooks in 1998. A number of video interviews with Harvey Jason about his book store exist on YouTube, in particular a video made by filmmaker John D. McMahon.

== Selected filmography ==
- Lilith (1964) as Patient (uncredited)
- The Girl from U.N.C.L.E. (1967, TV Series) as Cecil / Bebe / Terry Crump
- The Rat Patrol (1967, TV Series) as Perkins
- Batman (1967, TV Series) as Scudder
- Hallmark Hall of Fame (1967, TV Movie) as Herald
- Cowboy in Africa (1968, TV Series) as Albert
- Star! (1968) as Bert
- Gaily, Gaily (1969) as Quinn
- The Outcasts (1969, TV Series) as Limey
- The Flying Nun (1970, TV Series) as Fernando Morales
- Too Late the Hero (1970) as Signalman Scott
- The Young Rebels (1970, TV Series) as Corporal Davies
- Rowan & Martin's Laugh-In (1970–1971, TV Series) as Regular Performer
- Cold Turkey (1971) as Hypnotist
- Night Gallery (1972, TV Series) as Morrow (segment "The Funeral")
- Columbo: Dagger of the Mind (1972, TV Series) as The Director
- Necromancy (1972) as Dr. Jay
- Save the Tiger (1973) as Rico
- Genesis II (1973, TV Series) as Singh
- Oklahoma Crude (1973) as Wilcox
- Sanford and Son (1973, TV Series) as Dr. Stewart
- Bob & Carol & Ted & Alice (1973, TV Series) as Gus
- The Streets of San Francisco (1974, TV Series) as Warburton
- Lost in the Stars (1974) as Arthur Jarvis
- Police Woman (1974, TV Series) as Don
- Hawaii Five-O (1975, TV Series) as Ram Bushan
- Amy Prentiss (1975, TV Series) as Fleishman
- Harry O (1975, TV Series) as Dr. William Bronson
- Caribe (1975, TV Series) as Waite
- Cannon (1975, TV Series) as Terrorist
- The Specialist (1975) as Hardin Smith
- Dr. Minx (1975) as David Brown
- I Wonder Who's Killing Her Now? (1975) as Mr. Patlow
- Rich Man, Poor Man (1976, TV Mini-Series) as Pinky
- The Gumball Rally (1976) as Lapchik the Mad Hungarian – Kawasaki
- Captains and the Kings (1976, TV Mini-Series) as Haroun 'Harry' Zieff
- Charlie's Angels (1977, TV Series) as Alvin
- Man from Atlantis (1977, TV Series) as Dashki
- The Love Boat (1978, TV Series) as Howard Wilson
- Wonder Woman (1978, TV Series) as Professor Brubaker
- CHiPs (1978, TV Series) as Lee
- The French Atlantic Affair (1979, TV Mini-Series) as Plessier
- Archie Bunker's Place (1981, TV Series) as Mr. Freeman
- Bring 'Em Back Alive (1982–1983, TV Series) as Bhundi
- Trapper John, M.D. (1983, TV Series) as Martin Hopkins
- Airwolf (1984, TV Series) as Alexi Provov
- Crazy Like a Fox (1985, TV Series)
- The Fall Guy (1984–1985, TV Series) as Rudolph / Grant Llewellyn
- Scarecrow and Mrs. King (1985, TV Series) as James Brand
- Knight Rider (1986, TV Series) as Marco Berio
- Family Ties (1986, TV Series) as Pierre
- Bad Guys (1986) as Prof. Gimble
- Valerie (1986, TV Series) as Carlos
- You Again? (1986, TV Series) as Maitre d'
- The Wizard (1987, TV Series) as Redman
- Houston Knights (1987, TV Series)
- Star Trek: The Next Generation (1988, TV Series) as Felix Leech
- Night Court (1988, TV Series) as Maurice
- Oliver & Company (1988) (voice)
- Dynasty (1989, TV Series) as Ray Montana
- Hardball (1989, TV Series)
- Alien Nation (1990, TV Series) as Mr. Hopper
- The Platinum Triangle (1990) as Victor Kolter
- Air America (1990) as Nino
- White Palace (1990) (voice)
- Hi Honey – I'm Dead (1991, TV Movie) as Dr. Jahundi
- FernGully: The Last Rainforest (1992) (voice)
- L.A. Law (1993, TV Series) as Dr. Kaiser, Psychiatrist
- Picket Fences (1992–1994, TV Series) as Rabbi Barry Wald
- Diagnosis: Murder (1994, TV Series) as Stuart Westlake
- Seinfeld (1996, TV Series) as Auctioneer
- Street Corner Justice (1996) as Lou Wisceman
- The Lost World: Jurassic Park (1997) as Ajay Sidhu, the hunter
- The Curse of Monkey Island (1997, Video Game) as Cabana Boy / La Foot (voice)
- Star Wars: Force Commander (2000, Video Game) as AT-PT Driver / Medical Droid 2-1C (voice)
- Soul Survivors (2001)
- Star Wars: Galactic Battlegrounds (2001) as Empire transport ship captain / Royal lifter pilot (voice)
