= Katherine Justice =

American actress (born 1942)

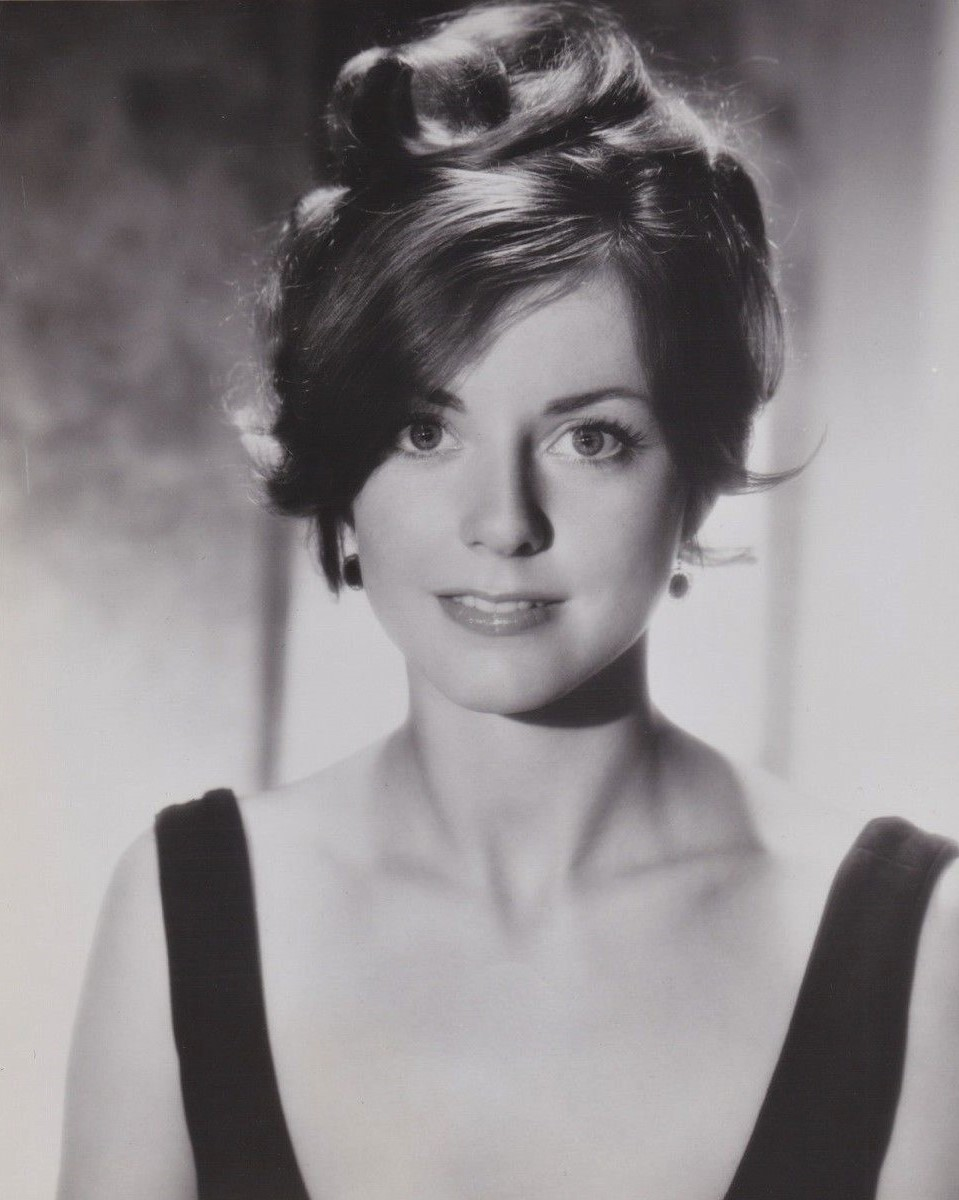
- Justice in 1967
- Born: October 28, 1942 (age 83); Ohio, U.S.
- Education: Carnegie Tech
- Occupation: Actress
- Years active: 1952–2015
- Spouse: James Brown Jr.

Katherine Justice (born October 28, 1942) is an American actress with many television guest star roles in the 1960s on through the 1980s and a few major film roles.

She had a leading role as a criminal conspirator in the made-for-TV movie, Prescription: Murder (1968), which later became the popular television mystery series Columbo.

She played the recurring role of Sheila Hogan in Falcon Crest starting in 1982. She portrayed Rita Jones in the syndicated drama Dangerous Women (1991).

== Early life and education ==
Justice was born and grew up in Ohio. She briefly was the 1960 Miss Ohio Universe, but wasn't able to compete in the Miss Universe competition when it was discovered she was 17, under the minimum 18 year age limit. Justice graduated from Carnegie Tech Drama School in 1964.

== Career ==
After graduating, Justice went to the Front Street Theater in Memphis for the summer of 1964. From there she performed at Washington's Arena Stage starring as Lola in Damn Yankees, and in other plays like He Who Gets Slapped, Heartbreak House and Hard Travelin'. Then for the summer of 1965, she toured with a summer stock company doing Nobody Loves an Albatross.

Justice's first television role was on The Big Valley in 1966. Before she even left the TV studio, she got a major part in the movie The Way West starring Kirk Douglas, Robert Mitchum, and Richard Widmark. Before the release of that movie, she was the mistress and accomplice (third billing) in the made-for-TV movie Prescription: Murder starring Peter Falk as Columbo and Gene Barry as the murderer. Her next movie role was the second female lead in 5 Card Stud with Dean Martin and Robert Mitchum starring. Dailies of her convinced Paramount Pictures to sign her for a five-year contract to make five pictures.

On March 14, 1967, she was a guest star on the science fiction television series The Invaders portraying a past love in the season one episode, "The Innocents". She guest starred again in 1968 in the season two episode "The Possessed".

She guest starred in the TV Western series Gunsmoke four times, including the 1971 three part episode, "The Bullet", and as a dance hall girl pretending to be a dying gunfighter's dead daughter in the 1970 episode, "Luke" (S16E8). She guest starred on Cannon as Meg, S1:E19 – "Blood on the Vine", airing January 18, 1972. She guest starred three times on Mannix as Maggie S3:E8 – "Memory: Zero", airing November 22, 1969, as Ellen, S4:E13 – "Duet for Three", airing December 19, 1970, and as Holly, S8:E19 – "Quartet for Blunt Instrument", airing February 22, 1975.

== Filmography ==
=== Film ===
Year	Title	Role	Notes
1967	The Way West	Amanda Mack	
1968	5 Card Stud	Nora Evers	
1972	The Stepmother	Margo Delgado	
1972	Limbo	Sharon Dornbeck	
1973	Frasier, the Sensuous Lion	Allison Stewart	
1981	Separate Ways	Sheila	

=== Television ===
Year	Title	Role	Notes
1966	The Big Valley	Melanie	S1:E27, "The River Monarch"
1966	Preview Tonight	Rachel	Season 1 Episode 4: "Roaring Camp"
1967	Iron Horse	Kate Preston	S1:E20, "The Bridge at Forty-Mile"
1967	Run for Your Life	Princess Ingrid	S3:E2, "The Inhuman Predicament"
1967	Judd for the Defense	Wendy Lukas	S1:E8, "Death from a Flower Girl"
1967–1968	The Invaders	Helen / Janet Garner	2 episodes
1967–1972	The F.B.I.	Uli Rim / Laurel Wyant / Liz Carvellis / Ellen Conway	4 episodes
1968	Prescription: Murder	Joan Hudson	TV Movie
1968	The Virginian	Ruby French	S7:E8, "Ride to Misadventure"
1969	Lancer	Julie Dennison	Season 2 Episode 10: "Legacy"
1969–1972	Gunsmoke	Lydia Fletcher / Doris Prebble / Beth Tilton / Clarabelle Callahan	6 episodes
1969–1975	Mannix	Maggie Wells / Ellen Gray / Holly Warlock	3 episodes
1970	The Psychiatrist	Persephone	Season 1 Episode 0: "God Bless the Children (Pilot)"
1971	Nanny and the Professor	Laurel Fielding	Season 2 Episode 14: "A Diller, a Dollar"
1971	Storefront Lawyers	Norma Andrews	S1:E22, "This Money Kills Dreams"
1971	Bearcats!	Hilda	S1:E4, "The Feathered Serpent"
1972	Marcus Welby, M.D.	Morgan Ellis	S4:E7, "The Wednesday Game"
1972–1976	Cannon	Meg Warren / Liza Carter / Julie Foster	3 episodes
1973–1977	Barnaby Jones	Liza Mills / Shirley Jennings / Suzanne Montaigne / Libby Price	4 episodes
1974	The New Perry Mason	Maggie Lawson	Season 1 Episode 15: "The Case of the Violent Valley"
1974	The Magician	Sandra Cassidy	Season 1 Episode 14: "The Illusion of the Queen's Gambit"
1974	Hawaii Five-O	Andrea Burdick	S6:E21, "Nightmare in Blue"
1974	The Streets of San Francisco	Katherine Wallach	Season 2 Episode 20: "Inferno"
1974	Doc Elliot	Pamela Barrows	Season 1 Episode 8: "A Time to Live"
1974	The Fisher Family	Liv Anderson	Episode: "The Harder They Fall"
1974	The Manhunter	Esther Cotton	Season 1 Episode 5: "Trackdown"
1975	Harry O	Anne	Season 1 Episode 14: "The Last Heir"s
1975	Insight	Lorelei	S1:E391, "The Pendulum"
1975	Dead Man on the Run	Libby Stockton	TV Movie
1975	Matt Helm	Paula	Season 1 Episode 1: "Dead Men Talk"
1975–1978	Police Woman	Mary Ann Webster / Karen Walters	2 episodes
1977	Guiding Light	Hope Bauer Spaulding #6	
1977	Tales of the Unexpected	Barbara	Season 1 Episode 4: "The Nomads"
1977	Most Wanted	Jennie Lawrence	S1:E20, "The People Mover"
1979	Ryan's Hope	Dr. Faith Coleridge	3 episodes
1979	Captain America II: Death Too Soon	Helen Moore	TV Movie
1980	The Misadventures of Sheriff Lobo	Toni Moore	Season 1 Episode 11: "Hail! Hail! The Gang's All Here"
1980	Freebie and the Bean	Marsha	S1:E1, "The Seduction of the Bean"
1981	Nero Wolfe	Angela Bell	S1:E1, "The Golden Spiders"
1981	A Gun in the House	Andrea Freemont	TV Movie
1981–1982	Quincy, M.E.	Holly Mahoney / Annie O'Connor	2 episodes
1982	Bush Doctor	Samantha	TV Movie
1982–1983	Falcon Crest	Sheila Hogan	9 episodes (Recurring role)
1983	Lottery!	Beverly Hanson	Season 1 Episode 7: "Kansas City: Protected Winner"
1983–1984	T.J. Hooker	Dr. Joan Wagner	2 episodes
1984	Blue Thunder	Kate Cunningham	S1:E4, "Revenge in the Sky"
1985	Simon & Simon	Donna Bertolli	S5:E5, "The Skull of Nostradamus"
1986	Hunter	Shirley Humphreys	2 episodes
1989	Alien Nation	Dr. Marcie Wright	Season 1 Episode 11: "The Red Room"
1989–1993	Days of Our Lives	Dr. Eleanor Smith	10 episodes
1991	Dallas	Alice Kingdom	S14:E22, "Conundrum, Part 1 and 2"
1991	The New Adam-12	Mrs. Hutchinson	S2:E16, "Playing with Fire"
1991–1992	Dangerous Women	Rita Jones	Series regular
2015	The Nevermore Chronicles	Madame Mocny	Season 1 Episode 6: "Lousy Psychic"
