= Quinn O'Hara =

Scottish-American actress (1941–2017)

- O'Hara in The Saint (1969)
- Born: Alice Jones; January 3, 1941; Edinburgh, Scotland
- Died: May 5, 2017 (aged 76); Los Angeles, California, U.S.
- Other names: Alice Kirk
- Citizenship: British and (from 1992) American
- Occupation: Actress

Quinn O'Hara (January 3, 1941 – May 5, 2017), born Alice Jones, was a Scottish-born American actress.

== Early life ==
O'Hara was born in Edinburgh. Later, she and her mother moved to Cardiff where she attended a convent school, then to Quebec when she was a teen, and eventually to Long Beach, California.

== Career ==
O'Hara was crowned Miss Scotland in a beauty contest held in Long Beach in 1960. In April 1963, photographer Gene Lester introduced O'Hara to singer-actor Fabian; they became a couple for a time in the 1960s. In 1964, she was the decorative "queen" of the American Road Race of Champions in Riverside, greeting and posing with winners for photographs. In 1969, she was chosen on The Dating Game and went on a chaperoned trip to Nepal.

O'Hara was a regular on The Lively Ones, a musical program that was broadcast on NBC television in the summers of 1962 and 1963. "I was just used as a decoration," she recalled later. She appeared in films including The Errand Boy (1961), The Caretakers (1963), Who's Minding the Store? (1963), The Patsy (1964), Good Neighbor Sam (1964), A Swingin' Summer (1965), The Ghost in the Invisible Bikini (1966), Cry of the Banshee (1970), Rubia's Jungle (1970), and The Teacher (1974). Her many television credits included appearances on Dragnet, The Man from U.N.C.L.E., The Saint, The Real McCoys, The Beverly Hillbillies, My Three Sons, CHiPs, T. J. Hooker, Trapper John, M.D., Fantasy Island, Quincy, M.E., and Dallas.

In 1978, O'Hara was working as a real estate agent in Beverly Hills. She became a United States citizen in 1992, and later worked as a nurse, known as Alice Kirk.

== Death ==
In 1986, O'Hara married William Kirk, some two decades her junior. She died at her home in Los Angeles on May 5, 2017, aged 76.
