= The Specialist (1975 film) =

1975 film by Howard Avedis

- Theatrical release poster
- Directed by: Howard Avedis
- Screenplay by: Howard Avedis; Marlene Schmidt
- Produced by: Howard Avedis
- Starring: Adam West; John Anderson; Ahna Capri; Harvey Jason; Alvy Moore; Marlene Schmidt
- Cinematography: Massoud Joseph
- Edited by: Norman Wallerstein
- Music by: Shorty Rogers
- Production company: Renaissance Productions
- Distributed by: Crown International Pictures
- Release date: May 1975
- Running time: 93 minutes
- Country: United States
- Language: English

The Specialist is a 1975 American thriller film directed by Howard Avedis and written by Howard Avedis and Marlene Schmidt. It was based on one of the stories in Come Now The Lawyers written by Ralph B. Potts. The film stars Adam West, John Anderson, Ahna Capri, Harvey Jason, Alvy Moore and Marlene Schmidt. The film was released in May 1975, by Crown International Pictures.

== Plot ==
When Pike Smith (John Anderson), a corrupt attorney for a California Water Company, is replaced by the flashy Jerry Bounds (Adam West), he hires Londa Wyeth (Ahna Capri), a voluptuous woman, to seduce Bounds and pose as a jury member so he can be disbarred from the profession.

== Cast ==
- Adam West as Jerry Bounds
- John Anderson as Pike Smith
- Ahna Capri as Londa Wyeth
- Harvey Jason as Hardin Smith
- Alvy Moore as Bailiff Humbolt
- Marlene Schmidt as Elizabeth Bounds
- Howard Avedis as Alec Sharkey
- Charles Knapp as Judge Davis
- Chuck Boyd as Arthur Farley
- Robert Shayne as Chairman Hopkins
- Christiane Schmidtmer as Nude Model

== Production ==
Ralph B. Potts in 1972 wrote Come Now The Lawyers. Howard Avedis adapted one of the stories from Come Now The Lawyers into The Specialist. Shorty Rogers composed the music for The Specialist.

== Critical response ==
Noel Murray of The A.V. Club wrote, "The Specialist [is], a plot-light, nudity-heavy legal drama featuring actors from Batman and Green Acres. The distinguished Mr. Potts must’ve been so proud."
