= Anthony James (actor) =

American actor (1942–2020)

- Born: James Anthony; July 22, 1942; Myrtle Beach, South Carolina, U.S.
- Died: May 26, 2020 (aged 77); Cambridge, Massachusetts, U.S.
- Occupation: Actor
- Years active: 1963–1992

Anthony James (born James Anthony; July 22, 1942 – May 26, 2020) was an American character actor who specialized in playing villains in films and television, mainly Westerns and crime dramas.

== Early life ==
Anthony James was born James Anthony in Myrtle Beach, South Carolina, on July 22, 1942, as the only child of Greek immigrants George Anthony (1893–1951) and Marika Palla (1913–2008). He later reversed the order of his given name and surname for his acting career, as there was already a SAG member named 'James Anthony'. He cited Marlon Brando as a role model.

== Career ==
James made several guest appearances on the Western series Gunsmoke during the series' run, appearing in different roles, most often playing the character of Elbert Moses. Other shows he guest-starred on include Hawaii Five-O; The High Chaparral; Bonanza; The Rookies; The Streets of San Francisco, Charlie's Angels; Starsky and Hutch; S.W.A.T.; Buck Rogers in the 25th Century; Holmes & Yoyo; The Fall Guy; The A-Team; Hunter; Quincy, M.E.; Star Trek: The Next Generation; Beauty and the Beast; and Married... with Children.

James also appeared in a number of major feature films. His first major role was as Ralph, the diner counterman in 1967's In the Heat of the Night.

His subsequent film appearances included P.J. (1968) and ...tick...tick...tick... (1970). He played one of the lynch mobsters in High Plains Drifter (1973), he had his first costar role as the stalker murderer obsessed with The Teacher (1974) starring Golden Globe Nominee, Angel Tompkins, and Jay North. He also appeared as a menacing, grinning chauffeur in the horror film Burnt Offerings (1976), which gained him a minor cult following among horror film fans. He had roles in Blue Thunder (1983), Nightmares (1983), and The Naked Gun 2½: The Smell of Fear (1991).

James also appeared in Poison's 1988 music video for their song "Fallen Angel". He retired from acting in the early 1990s, with his last film role as saloonkeeper Skinny Dubois in Clint Eastwood's 1992 Unforgiven, the Academy Award-winning film for Best Picture of 1992. It is notable that his first and last major film appearances were each in Academy Award-winning films for Best Picture.

After retirement to Arlington, Massachusetts, he concentrated on painting. In 1994, he published a book of art and poetry, Language of the Heart. His autobiography, Acting My Face, was published in 2014.

== Death ==
James died from cancer in Cambridge, Massachusetts, on May 26, 2020, aged 77.

== Selected filmography ==
- In the Heat of the Night (1967) — Ralph
- P.J. (1968) — Bartender-Assailant (uncredited)
- Sam Whiskey (1969) — Cousin Leroy
- ...tick...tick...tick... (1970) — H.C. Tolbert
- Vanishing Point (1971) — First Male Hitchhiker
- The Culpepper Cattle Co. (1972) — Nathaniel
- High Plains Drifter (1973) — Cole Carlin
- The Teacher (1974) — Ralph Gordon
- Hearts of the West (1975) — Lean Crook
- Burnt Offerings (1976) — The Chauffeur
- Victory at Entebbe (1976) — Gamal Fahmy
- Return from Witch Mountain (1978) — Sickle
- Texas Detour (1978) — Beau Hunter
- The Fifth Floor (1978) — Derrick
- Ravagers (1979) — Ravager Leader
- Soggy Bottom, U.S.A. (1981) — Raymond
- Wacko (1982) — Zeke
- Blue Thunder (1983) — Grundelius
- Nightmares (1983) — Store Clerk (segment "Terror in Topanga")
- The A-Team (1985) — Connor
- World Gone Wild (1987) — Ten Watt
- Mortuary Academy (1988) — Abbott Smith
- Slow Burn (1989) — Renzetti
- The Naked Gun 2½: The Smell of Fear (1991) — Hector Savage
- Unforgiven (1992) — Skinny Dubois (final film role)
