= The Teacher (1974 film) =

1974 film by Howard Avedis

- Theatrical release poster
- Directed by: Hikmet Avedis
- Written by: Hikmet Avedis
- Produced by: Hikmet Avedis
- Starring: Angel Tompkins; Jay North; Anthony James; Marlene Schmidt; Barry Atwater
- Cinematography: Alfred Taylor
- Edited by: Norman Wallerstein
- Music by: Shorty Rogers
- Production company: Crown International Pictures
- Release date: May 10, 1974
- Running time: 98 minutes
- Country: United States
- Language: English
- Budget: $65,000
- Box office: $1.4 million

The Teacher is a 1974 American coming-of-age erotic thriller film produced, written, and directed by Hikmet Avedis. The film stars Angel Tompkins, Jay North, and Anthony James, and tells the story of an 18-year-old's first relationship with his alluring teacher, and the hidden danger awaiting them in the shadows.

The film was made in 12 days for an estimated $65,000 and released by Crown International Pictures. The Teacher is Avedis' exploitation homage to 1967's The Graduate.

== Plot ==
It is summer, and obsessed Ralph Gordon stalks a high-school teacher, 28-year-old Diane Marshall. He watches her from an old warehouse while she is relaxing in her swimsuit on one of the boats. One of Diane's students, 18-year-old Sean Roberts and Ralph's younger brother Lou, also watch her strip naked and exercise. An angry Ralph yells at them, brandishing a bayonet. Shocked at this, Lou falls over the railing to his death, for which Ralph falsely blames Sean.

Later that night, Ralph confronts Sean again, threatening to cut the boy's tongue out should he reveal anything. The sheriff questions Sean, who lies due to seeing Ralph eyeing him. The next day, Sean meets with Diane, who invites him to have tea. Diane reveals that she knows about Ralph stalking her. On their way home, Sean and she see Ralph watching them. Diane invites Sean into her house for a drink. This soon escalates into a moment of passionate sex while Ralph, unknown to them, watches jealously.

Diane invites Sean to her boat the next day. Ralph arrives and threatens Sean with a handheld harpoon. However, upon seeing Diane, he flees. Diane later asks Sean to dinner, after which Ralph again threatens him with the bayonet. Diane then tells Sean's parents about Ralph's threats. The next day, Sean drives Diane home and they have a pool party together, then have sex. Diane receives a phone call from her drifter husband telling her that he is coming back, but Diane tells him she is divorcing him.

As Sean gets into his van to drive home, he is held at bayonet point by Ralph and ordered to drive to the warehouse. Sean manages to get away and arms himself with a rifle, but Ralph reveals that the gun is loaded with blanks. Ralph gets him in a chokehold, which ends up killing him. Diane arrives on the scene, where Ralph tells her that he killed Sean so he can be with her. A horrified Diane pleads tearfully with him. Ralph, overcome with anger and jealousy at Diane's love for Sean over himself, tries to strangle her. Diane manages to stab him with his own bayonet and flees crying, leaving Ralph to bleed to death. Diane finds Sean's body, breaks down and weeps.

== Cast ==
- Angel Tompkins ... Diane Marshall
- Jay North ... Sean Roberts
- Anthony James ... Ralph Gordon
- Marlene Schmidt ... Alice Roberts
- Barry Atwater ... Sheriff Murphy
- Med Flory ... Joe Roberts
- Rudy Herrera Jr. ... Lou Gordon
- Quinn O'Hara ... Margaret Parker
- Sivi Aberg ... Bonnie Nelson
- Richard Winterstein ... Russell Marshall
- Katherine Cassavetes ... Gossiping Lady 1
- Lady Rowlands ... Gossiping Lady 2
- Cassandra Lucas ... Waitress

== Reception ==
Although 22 years old during principal production, North was still largely known to audiences as the impish child he had played 10 years before on the CBS family series Dennis the Menace. Prior to the release of the film, columnist Jack O'Brian reported of the "vulgarity" of North's first adult feature film role: "Nice little Jay North (TV's Dennis the Menace only a few smiles ago) has a bang-up role in 'The Teacher' flick -- an explicit porn-scene with Angel Tompkins."

While not impressed with what he deemed to be a "ludicrous" storyline, Los Angeles Times critic Kevin Thomas expressed appreciation for the portrayal of the film's two lead characters, writing:

The plot of 'The Teacher' isn't worth outlining, yet it develops a relationship between a 28-year-old woman and an 18-year-old high school boy with sensitivity and credibility unusual for an exploitation film. [...] Avedis displays much concern for his people and allows Miss Tompkins and North plenty of room to give fresh, spontaneous performances.

== See also ==
- List of American films of 1974
