= Rivers of Fire and Ice =

Rivers of Fire and Ice or African Safari
- Theatrical poster in release as African Safari
- Directed by: Ronald E. Shanin
- Written by: Ronald E. Shanin
- Produced by: Ronald E. Shanin
- Cinematography: Ronald E. Shanin
- Production company: R.E. Shanin Enterprises
- Distributed by: Crown International Pictures
- Release date: April 2, 1969
- Running time: 98 minutes
- Country: United States
- Language: English

Rivers of Fire and Ice, alternatively titled African Safari, is a Crown International Pictures 1969 motion picture filmed in documentary format. Directed, written and produced by wildlife photographer Ron Shanin, the film is an account of a safari through "wildest" Africa and explores Africa's diversity, ranging from scorching deserts to the frozen heights of Mount Kilimanjaro, and the life of the continent's inhabitants. The film culminates with the eruption of Mt Kilimanjaro.

== See also ==
- List of American films of 1969
