= Dr. Minx =

1975 film by Howard Avedis

- Directed by: Howard Avedis
- Written by: Howard Avedis
- Produced by: Howard Avedis
- Starring: Edy Williams; Randy Boone; Harvey Jason; Marlene Schmidt; William Smith
- Cinematography: Massoud Joseph
- Edited by: Norman Wallerstein
- Music by: Shorty Rogers
- Distributed by: Dimension Pictures
- Release date: 1975
- Running time: 94 minutes
- Country: United States
- Language: English

Dr. Minx is a 1975 sexploitation film, produced, written and directed by Howard Avedis. It stars Edy Williams and Randy Boone.

== Plot ==
Dr. Carol Evans, a physician who recently conspired with her lover Gus to kill her rich husband for his inheritance, finds herself being blackmailed by him for a share of the money. Carol seduces Brian, a young motorcycle-accident patient of hers, in the hope that he’ll help her kill Gus. When Gus is killed in a struggle, Carol coerces him into hiding the body, but finds herself being investigated by Brian's friend David, an amateur sleuth, who has always believed her to be a murderer.

== Cast ==
- Edy Williams as Dr. Carol Evans
- Randy Boone as Brian Thomas
- Harvey Jason as David Brown
- Marlene Schmidt as Harriet Thomas
- William Smith as Gus Dolan
- Alvy Moore as Sheriff Frank
- Charles Knapp as Bill Brown
- Chuck Boyd as Fred Thomas
- Maggie Appel as Mabel Brown
