= Howard Avedis =

American film director

- Born: Hikmet Labib Avedis; 25 May 1927; Baghdad, Iraq
- Died: 25 October 2017 (aged 90); United States
- Occupations: Film director, film producer, author

Howard Avedis, born Hikmet Labib Avedis,(25 May 1927 – 25 October 2017), was an Iraqi-born film director, producer and author

== Background ==
Avedis lived in Southern California with his wife Marlene.

As a film student, he studied at the University of Southern California and won the George Cukor Award.

As of 2014, he was working on his second novel. His first publication was Hotel Paradise: Nothing Is as It Seems.

== Film work ==
His early work as a director included The Stepmother in 1972, a film that starred Alejandro Rey. In 1974, he directed and produced The Teacher, shot in 12 days all around Los Angeles, on a budget of $65,000 using the investor producers home, his boat and clever use of the industrial abandoned (used mostly for location shooting ) industrial manufacturing section in east L.A., a film that starred Angel Tompkins, Jay North and Anthony James. in 1975, he produced and directed The Fifth Floor, a film about a young lady who gets sent to the psych ward called "The Filth Floor". It starred Dianne Hull and Bo Hopkins. Other films he has produced or directed include Mortuary, Separate Ways and They're Playing with Fire. Crown International released the film and The Teacher has remained a popular cult film to this day.

In 2007, his film The Teacher paired with The Pick Up and released on a DVD titled "Welcome to the Grindhouse: Two Sinful Shockers". In May 2012, his 1983 horror film Mortuary was transferred to DVD, with special features included, in HD mastered from the original Inter-Negative. It was released by Scorpio Releasing in conjunction with Camelot Entertainment.

== Filmography ==
- The Stepmother (1972)
- The Teacher (1974)
- The Specialist (1975)
- Dr. Minx (1975)
- Scorchy (1976)
- Texas Detour (1978)
- The Fifth Floor (1978)
- Separate Ways (1981)
- Mortuary (1982)
- They're Playing with Fire (1984)
- Kidnapped (1987)

== Books ==
- Hotel Paradise – (2014) ISBN 149357566X, 9781493575664
