= Paradise Bungalows =

1987 film directed by Francesco Lucente

- Directed by: Francesco Lucente
- Written by: Francesco Lucente
- Produced by: Olimpia Lucente
- Cinematography: Kevin Alexander; Joseph Bitonti
- Edited by: Rick Doe
- Music by: Brian Island; Danny Lowe; Brad Steckel
- Release date: 1987
- Country: USA
- Language: English

Paradise Bungalows 1987 - re-released in 2025 - a teen comedy film directed by Francesco Lucente and starring Joseph R. Straface, Stacy Christensen, and J. T. Wotton.

== Plot ==
In Riverside Heights, sturdy and unpretentious Mike Underwood (Joe Straface) enters a high-stakes $2,000 wager with the local bully, Randy (Lee Barringer). The challenge: Mike must convince Diane (Stacy Christensen)--a beautiful young woman known as "Snow White" for her pure reputation--to spend a weekend at the mountain resort Paradise Bungalows. Mike's initial schemes are comedic disasters. He first poses as a milkman, but a chocolate milk carton explodes, soaking Diane and her home in a sticky mess. Encouraged by his friend Charles (J.T. Wotton), Mike then adopts a "007" persona. He follows Diane to Kilarney Pool, where he nearly drowns trying to fake swimming skills, only to be rescued by Diane herself. Moved by his vulnerability, Diane agrees to an ice cream date, where they begin to form a real connection. As Mike navigates Diane's overbearing mother, Marion (Bev Wotton), and her mother's plans for her to marry a boring accountant, he invites Diane to the bungalows with a promise of separate rooms. At the resort, the two bond over a terrifying and hilarious encounter with two bears outside their cabin. Mike's bravery--and his accidental activation of a noisy alarm clock--scares the bears away and solidifies Diane's feelings for him. The romance shatters upon their return when Diane's friend Judy (Anna Lisa Iapaolo) reveals the truth about the $2,000 bet. Devastated and humiliated, Diane leaves Mike. To redeem himself and clear Diane's name, Mike challenges Randy to a deadly game of "chicken" at an old airport. Mike refuses to swerve, winning the game and forcing Randy to publicly apologize to the girls. Having won back Diane's heart through genuine courage rather than a scheme, Mike ends the story by playfully introducing himself to her mother as "Luke Skywalker".

== Cast ==
- Joseph R. Straface as Mike
- Stacy Christensen as Diane
- J.T. Wotton as Charles
- Anna Lisa Iapaolo as Judy
- Lee Barringer as Randy
- Bev Wotton as Diane's Mother
- Terrance Ballinger as D.J.
- Tara Wilder as the Waitress
- Barry Onody as the Bartender (as Barry Allen Onody)
- John Michaud as Allan

== Release ==
Paradise Bungalows was re-released worldwide on streaming, in Jan 2025. The Blu-ray will be released in the fall 2026. It includes the original 80's hit song soundtrack.

== Reception ==
The restored version released in January, 2025 received mostly positive reviews for recapturing the high quality of the original super16mm color negative and the pristine 80's soundtrack.
