= It's Coming (disambiguation) =

"It's Coming" is the ninth episode of the third season of the NBC superhero drama series Heroes (American TV series).

It's Coming may also refer to:

- It's Coming (film), a 2023 documentary film directed by Shannon Alexander
- It's Coming, a 2020 film directed by Nathan Truesdell
- "It's Coming", an episode of Here and Now (2018 TV series)
- "It's Coming", a 1994 song by Insane Clown Posse from A Carnival Christmas
- "Tsukame (It's Coming)", a 2020 song by JO1 from The Star
