= Dance of the Dwarfs =

- Directed by: Gus Trikonis
- Screenplay by: Larry Johnson; Gregory Weston King; Michael Viner
- Based on: Dance of the Dwarfs by Geoffrey Household
- Produced by: Michael Viner
- Starring: Peter Fonda; Deborah Raffin; John Amos; Carlos Palomino
- Cinematography: Michael Butler
- Edited by: Fred Chulak
- Music by: Perry Botkin Jr.
- Release date: June 10, 1983 (West Germany)
- Running time: 93 minutes
- Country: United States
- Language: English

Dance of the Dwarfs is a 1983 American horror adventure film directed by Gus Trikonis and starring Peter Fonda and Deborah Raffin. It is based on the 1968 novel of the same name by Geoffrey Household.

== Plot ==
In an unnamed South American nation, a man escapes from prison into the jungle, where he is attacked by an unseen assailant and has much of his face torn off.

Anthropologist Evelyn Howard (Deborah Raffin) decides to look for Dr. Eslinger, a colleague who went missing in the same jungle while searching for the Duende—a rumored tribe of dwarfish, winged reptiloids (reptile-like people). She hires alcoholic helicopter pilot Harry Bediker (Peter Fonda) to fly her into the jungle. A local shaman (John Amos) warns the pair to avoid "the Killing Place" (the tribe's legendary home). Unfortunately, someone shoots at the helicopter and severs its fuel line, forcing it to land in the jungle. They discover that they've crashed near a fortress-like trading post run by Luis (Venchito Galvez) and Maria (Iliang Vitales). Evelyn and Harry bicker constantly and debate whether the cooking oil stored in large quantities at the trading post will suffice as helicopter fuel. Although Dr. Eslinger's diaries, left behind at the trading post, indicate the reptiloids are hostile, Evelyn is convinced they are not. Harry decides to abandon Evelyn, just as she figures out where the Killing Place is. Dr. Eslinger was right, of course, and Harry must rescue Evelyn before she's killed.

== Cast ==
- Peter Fonda as Harry Bediker
- Deborah Raffin as Dr. Evelyn Howard
- John Amos as Esteban
- Carlos Palomino as Bandit #1

== Production ==
The film was shot in the Philippines. Deborah Raffin commented that her and Fonda's characters "dislike each other so intensely you just know they'll fall in love", and that the movie itself was "a fun movie. A wonderfully well-done popcorn movie". After finishing the movie, Deborah Raffin hoped for a breakthrough in Chinese cinema. She visited the country to promote another film, Touched by Love, and brokered a deal to distribute Dance of the Dwarfs in China for free, only in exchange for the rights to sell the Chinese film Memories of Old Beijing to a Western film distributor. American newspapers speculated that Dance of the Dwarfs might "have a massive potential audience in that land" (China).

== Reception ==
Film critic Leonard Maltin awarded the film one and a half stars. TV Guide called the film a "rip-off of The African Queen".

== Novel ==
Critical reception for the novel was positive. A reviewer for the South Bend Tribune noted that the novel was "good mystery fare".
