= Deborah Raffin =

American actress (1953–2012)

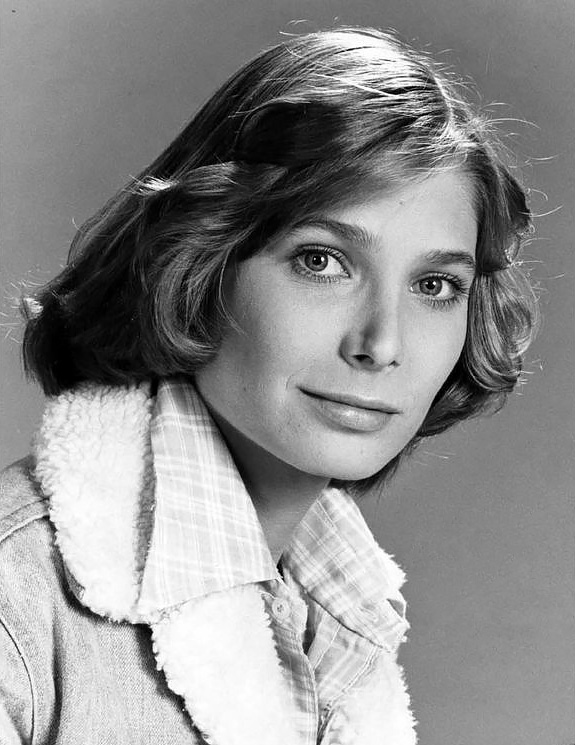
- Raffin in 1979
- Born: Deborah Iona Raffin; March 13, 1953; Los Angeles, California, U.S.
- Died: November 21, 2012 (aged 59); Los Angeles, California, U.S.
- Occupations: Actress; model; audiobook publisher
- Years active: 1973–2012
- Spouse: Michael Viner (m. 1974; div. 2005)
- Children: 1
- Mother: Trudy Marshall

Deborah Iona Raffin (March 13, 1953 – November 21, 2012) was an American actress, model and audiobook publisher.

== Early life ==
Raffin was born in Los Angeles to actress Trudy Marshall and Phillip Jordan Raffin, a restaurateur and business executive. Her father was Jewish, and her mother was Christian.

== Career ==
Like her mother, Raffin appeared as a model on numerous magazine covers including 'Teen, Seventeen and Good Housekeeping in the 1970s and 1980s and acted in several 1970s Hollywood films. She co-starred with Joseph Bottoms in the Gregory Peck-produced film The Dove (1974). Her 1976 television movie, Nightmare in Badham County, became a theatrical hit in mainland China, making Raffin a star there and leading to her later becoming the first Western actress ever to undertake a movie promotion tour in that country. She was nominated for both a Golden Globe Award for Best Actress and a Razzie Award for Worst Actress for her performance in Touched by Love in 1981. That same year, she starred in the TV series adaptation of the hit 1978 film Foul Play, in which she and Barry Bostwick took over the roles played by Goldie Hawn and Chevy Chase.

In 1988, she starred in James Clavell's Noble House with Pierce Brosnan. In 1991, she appeared as Julie Vale, a telepath, in the cult film Scanners II: The New Order alongside David Hewlett. She later appeared as Julie Camden Hastings on the television show 7th Heaven from 1996 to 2005, and as Dr. Hightower in the ABC Family series The Secret Life of the American Teenager from 2008 to 2010.

== Personal life ==
Raffin married film producer Michael Viner in 1974. The couple later became audiobook publishers. They had one child, daughter Taylor, and divorced in 2005.

== Death ==
On November 21, 2012, Raffin died from leukemia at the Ronald Reagan UCLA Medical Center in Los Angeles, one year after being diagnosed. She was 59 years old.

== Select filmography ==
- 1973 40 Carats as Trina Stanley
- 1974 The Dove as Patti Ratteree
- 1975 Jacqueline Susann's Once Is Not Enough as January Wayne
- 1976 God Told Me To as Casey Forster
- 1976 Nightmare in Badham County (TV movie)
- 1977 The Sentinel as Jennifer
- 1977 The Ransom (aka Assault on Paradise) as Cindy Simmons
- 1979 Mind Over Murder (TV movie) as Suzy
- 1979 The Last Convertible (TV miniseries, two episodes)
- 1979 Willa (TV movie)
- 1980 Touched by Love as Lena Canada
- 1980 Haywire (TV miniseries) as Brooke Hayward
- 1981 Killing at Hell’s Gate (TV movie) as Anna Medley
- 1982 For Lovers Only as Lilah Ward
- 1983 Dance of the Dwarfs as Dr. Evelyn Howard
- 1983 Running Out (TV movie) as Elizabeth St. Claire
- 1983 Grizzly II: Revenge as Samantha Owens
- 1983 Sparkling Cyanide (TV movie) as Iris Murdoch
- 1984 Lace II (TV miniseries, three episodes) as Judy Hale
- 1984 Last Video and Testament episode from Hammer House of Mystery and Suspense (TV Series) as Selena Frankham
- 1985 Death Wish 3 as Kathryn Davis
- 1985 Claudia as Claudia
- 1988 Noble House (TV miniseries, four episodes) as Casey Tcholok
- 1989 B.L. Stryker (episode "Carolann") as Carolann
- 1990 Night of the Fox as Sarah Drayton
- 1993 Morning Glory as Elly Dinsmore (also co-writer of screenplay)
- 1996 7th Heaven as Julie Camden
