= John Barry (composer) =

English composer and conductor (1933–2011)

John Barry OBE
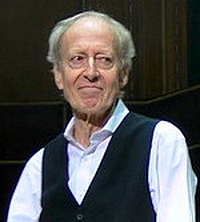
- Barry in 2006
- Born: John Barry Prendergast; 3 November 1933; York, England
- Died: 30 January 2011 (aged 77); Oyster Bay, New York, U.S.
- Occupations: Composer; conductor
- Spouses: Barbara Pickard (m. 1959; div. 1963); Jane Birkin (m. 1965; div. 1968); Jane Sidey (m. 1969; div. 1978); Laurie Barry (m. 1978)
- Children: 4, including Kate
- Musical career
- Genres: Film & television
- Years active: 1951–2011
- Formerly of: The John Barry Seven

John Barry Prendergast OBE (3 November 1933 – 30 January 2011) was an English composer and conductor of film music. Born in York, Barry spent his early years working in cinemas owned by his father. During his national service with the British Army in Cyprus, Barry began performing as a musician after learning to play the trumpet. Upon completing his national service, he formed a band in 1957, the John Barry Seven. He later developed an interest in composing and arranging music, making his début for television in 1958. He came to the notice of the filmmakers of the first James Bond film Dr. No, who were dissatisfied with a theme for James Bond given to them by Monty Norman. Noel Rogers, the head of music at United Artists, approached Barry. This started a successful association between Barry and the Bond series that lasted for 25 years.

Barry composed the scores for eleven of the James Bond films between 1963 and 1987, as well as arranging and performing the "James Bond Theme" for the first film in the series, 1962's Dr. No. He wrote the Grammy- and Academy Award-winning scores to the films Dances with Wolves (1990) and Out of Africa (1985), as well as the scores of The Scarlet Letter (1995), Chaplin (1992), The Cotton Club (1984), Game of Death (1972), The Tamarind Seed (1974), Mary, Queen of Scots (1971), The Ipcress File (1965), and the theme for the television series The Persuaders!, in a career spanning over 50 years. In 1999, he was appointed an OBE for services to music.

Barry received awards including five Academy Awards: two for Born Free and one each for The Lion in Winter (for which he also won the first BAFTA Award for Best Film Music), Out of Africa and Dances with Wolves (both of which also won him Grammy Awards). He also received ten Golden Globe Award nominations, winning once for Best Original Score for Out of Africa in 1986. Barry completed his last film score, Enigma, in 2001 and recorded the successful album Eternal Echoes the same year. He then concentrated chiefly on live performances and co-wrote the music to the musical Brighton Rock in 2004 alongside Don Black.

In 2001, Barry became a Fellow of the British Academy of Songwriters, Composers and Authors, and, in 2005, he was made a Fellow of the British Academy of Film and Television Arts. Barry was married four times and had four children. He moved to the United States in 1975 and lived there until his death in 2011.

== Biography ==
=== Early life and education ===
Barry was born John Barry Prendergast in York, the youngest of four children. His mother, a classical pianist, was English; his Irish father, John Xavier "Jack" Prendergast from Cork, was a projectionist during the silent film era and later owned a chain of cinemas across northern England. As a result of his father's work, Barry was raised in and around cinemas in northern England and he later stated that this childhood background influenced his musical tastes and interests. He had two older brothers and one older sister. Barry was educated at Bar Convent (primary) School then St Peter's School, York, and received composition lessons from Francis Jackson, Organist of York Minster.

=== Career ===
Barry spent his national service in the British Army playing the trumpet, working from a correspondence course with jazz composer Bill Russo. After national service he worked as an arranger for the orchestras of Jack Parnell and Ted Heath, forming his own band, the John Barry Seven, in 1957. The John Barry Seven recorded hit records on EMI's Columbia label including "Hit and Miss", the theme tune he composed for the BBC's Juke Box Jury programme; a cover of the Johnny Smith song "Walk Don't Run"; and a cover of the theme for the United Artists western The Magnificent Seven.

By 1959 Barry was gaining commissions to arrange music for other acts, starting with a young trio on Decca, coincidentally called the Three Barry Sisters, though unrelated both to Barry and American duo The Barry Sisters. The career breakthrough for Barry was the BBC television series Drumbeat, when he appeared with the John Barry Seven. He was employed by EMI from 1959 until 1962 arranging orchestral accompaniments for the company's singers, including Adam Faith. He also composed songs (along with Les Vandyke) and scores for films in which Faith was featured. When Faith made his first film, Beat Girl (1960), Barry composed, arranged and conducted the film score, his first. His music was later released as the UK's first soundtrack album.

Barry also composed the music for another Faith film, Never Let Go (also 1960), orchestrated the score for Mix Me a Person (1962), and composed, arranged and conducted the score for The Amorous Prawn (also 1962). In 1962, Barry transferred to Ember Records, where he produced and arranged albums.

These achievements caught the attention of the producers of a new film called Dr. No (1962) who were dissatisfied with a theme for James Bond given to them by Monty Norman. Barry was hired and his arrangement of Norman's composition created the "James Bond Theme". When the producers of the Bond series sought to hire Lionel Bart to score the next James Bond film From Russia with Love (1963), they learned that Bart could not read or write music. Though Bart wrote a title song for the film, the producers remembered Barry's arrangement of the James Bond Theme and his composing and arranging for several films with Adam Faith. Bart also recommended Barry to producer Stanley Baker for his 1964 film Zulu. That same year Bart and Barry collaborated on the film Man in the Middle; and then, in 1965, Barry worked with director Bryan Forbes in scoring the World War II prison-camp drama King Rat.

This was the turning point for Barry, and he subsequently won five Academy Awards and four Grammy Awards, with scores for, among others, Born Free (1966), The Lion in Winter (1968), Midnight Cowboy (1969) for which he did not receive an on-screen credit, and Somewhere in Time (1980).

Barry was often cited as having had a distinct style which concentrated on lush strings and extensive use of brass. He was one of the first to employ synthesizers in a film score (On Her Majesty's Secret Service, also 1969), and to make wide use of pop artists and songs in Midnight Cowboy. Because Barry provided not just the main title theme but the complete soundtrack score, his music often enhanced the critical reception of a film, notably in Midnight Cowboy, The Tamarind Seed, the first remake of King Kong (1976), Out of Africa (1985), and Dances with Wolves (1990). Barry would often watch films and would note down with pen and paper what worked or what did not.

Barry composed the theme for the TV series The Persuaders! (1971) in which Tony Curtis and Roger Moore were paired as rich playboys solving crimes. The instrumental recording features the cimbalom (which Barry also used for The Ipcress File (1965) and other themes) and Moog synthesizers. The theme was a hit single in many European countries (including France, Germany, and the Benelux states), contributing to the cult status of the series in Europe, and the record featured Barry's "The Girl with the Sun in Her Hair" on the B side, an instrumental piece featured in a long running TV advert for Sunsilk shampoo. Barry also wrote the scores to a number of musicals, including the 1965 Passion Flower Hotel (lyrics by Trevor Peacock), the successful 1974 West End show Billy (lyrics by Don Black), and two intended Broadway musicals that never opened on Broadway, Lolita, My Love (1971), with Alan Jay Lerner as lyricist, and The Little Prince and the Aviator (1981), again with lyricist Don Black. Barry also composed the soundtrack for the Bruce Lee film Game of Death (1978).

In 2001, the University of York conferred an honorary degree on Barry, and in 2002 he was named an Honorary Freeman of the City of York.

During 2006, Barry was the executive producer on an album entitled Here's to the Heroes by the Australian ensemble The Ten Tenors. The album features a number of songs Barry wrote in collaboration with his lyricist friend, Don Black. Barry and Black also composed one of the songs on Shirley Bassey's 2009 album, The Performance. The song, entitled "Our Time Is Now", is the first written by the duo for Bassey since "Diamonds Are Forever".

=== James Bond ===
After the success of Dr. No, Barry was hired to compose and perform eleven of the next fourteen James Bond films.

In his tenure with the film series, Barry's music, variously brassy and moody, achieved very wide appeal. For From Russia with Love he composed "007", an alternative James Bond signature theme, which is featured in four other Bond films (Thunderball, You Only Live Twice, Diamonds Are Forever, and Moonraker). The theme "Stalking", for the teaser sequence of From Russia with Love, was covered by colleague Marvin Hamlisch for The Spy Who Loved Me (1977). Barry also contributed indirectly to the soundtrack of the spoof version of Casino Royale (1967): his Born Free theme appears briefly in the opening sequence.

In Goldfinger (1964), he perfected the "Bond sound", a heady mixture of brass, jazz elements and sensuous melodies. There is even an element of Barry's jazz roots in the big-band track "Into Miami", which follows the title credits and accompanies the film's iconic image of the camera lens zooming toward the Fontainebleau Hotel in Miami Beach.

Barry's love for the Russian romantic composers is often reflected in his music; in his Bond scores he unites this with brass-heavy jazz writing. His use of strings, lyricism, half-diminished chords and complex key shifting provides melancholy contrast; in his scores this is often heard in variations of the title songs that are used to underscore plot development.

As Barry matured, the Bond scores became more lushly melodic (along with other scores of his such as The Tamarind Seed and Out of Africa) as in Moonraker (1979) and Octopussy (1983). Barry's score for A View to a Kill was traditional, but his collaboration with Duran Duran for the title song was contemporary and reached number one in the United States and number two in the UK Singles Chart. Both A View to a Kill and The Living Daylights theme by A-ha blended the pop music style of the bands with Barry's orchestration. In 2006, A-ha's Pal Waaktaar complimented Barry's contributions: "I loved the stuff he added to the track, I mean it gave it this really cool string arrangement. That's when for me it started to sound like a Bond thing."

Barry's last score for the Bond series was The Living Daylights (1987), Timothy Dalton's first film in the series, with Barry making a cameo appearance as a conductor in the film. Barry was intended to score Licence to Kill (1989) but was recovering from throat surgery at the time, and it was considered unsafe to fly him to London to complete the score. The score was completed by Michael Kamen.

David Arnold, a British composer, saw the result of two years' work in 1997 with the release of Shaken and Stirred: The David Arnold James Bond Project, an album of new versions of the themes from various James Bond films. Arnold thanks Barry in the sleeve notes, referring to him as "the Guvnor". Almost all of the tracks were Barry compositions, and the revision of his work met with his approval – he contacted Barbara Broccoli, producer of the then upcoming Tomorrow Never Dies, to recommend Arnold as the film's composer. Arnold also went on to score four subsequent Bond films: The World Is Not Enough, Die Another Day, Casino Royale and Quantum of Solace.

=== The James Bond theme ===
Monty Norman, who was contracted as composer for Dr. No, received sole compositional credit for the James Bond Theme. Nearly 40 years later, in 2001, the disputed authorship of the theme was examined legally in the High Court in London after Norman sued The Sunday Times for libel for publishing an article in 1997 in which Barry was named as the true composer; Barry testified for the defence.

In court, Barry testified that he had been handed a musical manuscript of a work by Norman (meant to become the theme) and that he was to arrange it musically, and that he composed additional music and arranged the "James Bond Theme". He also claimed that Norman received sole credit because of his prior contract with the producers. Barry said that a deal was struck whereby he would receive a flat fee of £250 and Norman would receive the songwriting credit. Barry said that he had accepted the deal with United Artists Head of Music Noel Rogers because it would help his career. Despite these claims, the jury ruled unanimously in favour of Norman.

On 7 September 2006, Barry reiterated his claim of authorship of the theme on the Steve Wright show on BBC Radio 2.

== Personal life ==
Barry was married four times. His first three marriages, to Barbara Pickard (1959–1963), Jane Birkin (1965–1968) and Jane Sidey (1969–1978) all ended in divorce. He was married to his fourth wife, Laurie, from January 1978 until his death. Barry had three daughters: Suzanne with his first wife, Barbara; Kate with his second wife, Jane; and Sian, from a relationship with Ulla Larson between the first two marriages. He also had a son, Jonpatrick with his last wife, Laurie.

In 1975, Barry moved to Los Angeles in the US. He had originally intended to stay there for only a few weeks, but stayed on the West Coast for almost five years. A British judge later accused him of emigrating to avoid paying £134,000 due to the Inland Revenue. The matter was resolved in the late 1980s, and Barry was able to return to the UK. He subsequently lived for many years in the United States, mainly in Oyster Bay, New York, in Centre Island on Long Island, from 1980.

Barry suffered a rupture of the esophagus in 1988, following a toxic reaction to a health tonic he had consumed. The incident rendered him unable to work for two years and left him vulnerable to pneumonia.

== Death ==
Barry died of a heart attack on 30 January 2011 at his Oyster Bay home, aged 77. He was buried in Locust Valley Cemetery, Locust Valley, New York.

A memorial concert took place on 20 June 2011 at the Royal Albert Hall in London, where the Royal Philharmonic Orchestra, Shirley Bassey, Rumer, David Arnold, Wynne Evans and others performed Barry's music. George Martin, Michael Parkinson, Don Black, Timothy Dalton and others also contributed to the celebration of his life and work. The event was sponsored by the Royal College of Music through a grant by the Broccoli Foundation.

== Awards and nominations ==
In 1999, Barry was made an Officer of the Order of the British Empire (OBE) for services to music. He received the BAFTA Academy Fellowship Award in 2005. In 2005, the American Film Institute ranked Barry's score for Out of Africa No. 15 on their list of the greatest film scores. His scores and original songs for the following films were nominated:

- Goldfinger (1964)
- Born Free (1966)
- The Lion in Winter (1968)
- Mary, Queen of Scots (1971)
- The Dove (1974)
- The Deep (1977)
- Somewhere in Time (1980)
- Body Heat (1981)
- Out of Africa (1985)
- A View to a Kill (1985)
- Dances with Wolves (1990)
- Chaplin (1992)

=== Accolades ===
Award	Year	Project	Category	Outcome
Academy Awards	1966	Born Free	Best Original Music Score	Won
Academy Awards	1966	"Born Free" (from Born Free), with Don Black	Best Original Song	Won
Academy Awards	1968	The Lion in Winter	Best Original Music Score – For a Motion Picture (Not a Musical)	Won
Academy Awards	1971	Mary, Queen of Scots	Best Original Dramatic Score	Nominated
Academy Awards	1985	Out of Africa	Best Original Score	Won
Academy Awards	1990	Dances with Wolves	Best Original Score	Won
Academy Awards	1992	Chaplin	Best Original Score	Nominated
BAFTA Awards	1968	The Lion in Winter	Anthony Asquith Award for Film Music	Won
BAFTA Awards	1986	Out of Africa	Best Score	Nominated
BAFTA Awards	1991	Dances with Wolves	Best Original Film Score	Nominated
BAFTA Awards	2005		BAFTA Academy Fellowship Award	Won
Golden Globe Awards	1966	"Born Free" (from Born Free), with Don Black	Best Original Song	Nominated
Golden Globe Awards	1968	The Lion in Winter	Best Original Score	Nominated
Golden Globe Awards	1971	Mary, Queen of Scots	Best Original Score	Nominated
Golden Globe Awards	1974	"Sail the Summer Winds" (from The Dove), with Don Black	Best Original Song	Nominated
Golden Globe Awards	1977	"Down Deep Inside" (from The Deep), with Donna Summer	Best Original Song	Nominated
Golden Globe Awards	1981	Somewhere in Time	Best Original Score	Nominated
Golden Globe Awards	1985	Out of Africa	Best Original Score	Won
Golden Globe Awards	1985	"A View to a Kill" (from A View to a Kill), with Duran Duran	Best Original Song	Nominated
Golden Globe Awards	1990	Dances with Wolves	Best Original Score	Nominated
Golden Globe Awards	1992	Chaplin	Best Original Score	Nominated

Grammy Award

- 1969 Best Instrumental Theme for Midnight Cowboy
- 1985 Best Jazz Instrumental Performance, Big Band for The Cotton Club
- 1985 Best Instrumental Composition for Out of Africa
- 1991 Best Instrumental Composition for Dances with Wolves

Grammy Award nominations

- 1965 Grammy Award for Best Score Soundtrack for Visual Media for Goldfinger

Emmy Award nominations

- 1964 Outstanding Achievement in Composing Original Music for Television for Elizabeth Taylor in London (a 1963 television special)
- 1977 Outstanding Achievement in Music Composition for a Special (Dramatic Underscore) for Eleanor and Franklin: The White House Years

Golden Raspberry Award

- 1981 Worst Musical Score for The Legend of the Lone Ranger

Max Steiner Lifetime Achievement Award (presented by the City of Vienna)

- 2009

Lifetime Achievement Award from World Soundtrack Academy (presented at the Ghent Film Festival)

- 2010

In 2011, he received the Brit Award for Outstanding Contribution to Music.

Barry was inducted into the Songwriters Hall of Fame in 1998.

== Filmography ==
=== Bond films ===
Barry worked on the soundtracks for the following James Bond films (title song collaborators in brackets):

- Dr. No (1962) – "James Bond Theme" (composed by Monty Norman) as arranged by Barry used on main and end titles, key points such as Bond's arrival in Jamaica
- From Russia with Love (title song music and lyrics by Lionel Bart) (1963)
- Goldfinger (lyrics by Anthony Newley and Leslie Bricusse) (1964)
- Thunderball (lyrics by Don Black) (1965)
- You Only Live Twice (lyrics by Leslie Bricusse) (1967)
- On Her Majesty's Secret Service (1969)
- Diamonds Are Forever (lyrics by Don Black) (1971)
- The Man with the Golden Gun (lyrics by Don Black) (1974)
- Moonraker (lyrics by Hal David) (1979)
- Octopussy – "All Time High" (lyrics by Tim Rice) (1983)
- A View to a Kill (music and lyrics by Duran Duran) (1985)
- The Living Daylights (music and lyrics by Paul Waaktaar-Savoy) (1987)

In addition, a brief excerpt from the song "Born Free" is heard during a sequence in the non-EON Productions Bond film, Casino Royale (1967).

=== Film and television work ===
Year	Film	Directed by	Singles	Latest CD / Digital Release
1959	Drumbeat (TV series theme music)	Stewart Morris		
1959	Juke Box Jury (TV series theme music)	Peter Potter	Hit And Miss	EMI / 07243 523073 2 6 / 1997
1960	Never Let Go	John Guillermin		
1960	Beat Girl	Edmond T. Gréville		Cherry Red / ACMEM204CD / 2011
1962	Dateline London (TV series theme music)		Columbia 45-DB 4806: Cutty Sark	EMI / 07243 523073 2 6 / 1997
1962	The Amorous Prawn	Anthony Kimmins		
1962	The L-Shaped Room	Bryan Forbes		
1963	Elizabeth Taylor in London	Sid Smith		Él / ACMEM59CD / ???
1963	From Russia with Love	Terence Young		EMI / 72435-80588-2-6 / 2003
1964	Zulu	Cy Endfield	UA 743: Zulu Stamp / Big Shield	Ember Records / NR 5012 / 2010
1964	Man in the Middle	Guy Hamilton		
1964	Impromptu (TV series soundtrack)	David Croft		
1964	A Jolly Bad Fellow	Don Chaffey		
1964	Séance on a Wet Afternoon	Bryan Forbes	United Artists Records UP1060: Seance on a Wet Afternoon / Oublie Ca	EMI / 07243 523073 2 6 / 1997
1964	Goldfinger	Guy Hamilton		EMI / 72435-80891-2-7 / 2003
1964	Sophia Loren in Rome	Sheldon Reynolds		P.E.G. Recordings / PEG023 / 1998
1965	Boy and Bicycle ("Onward Christian Spacemen")	Ridley Scott		
1965	The Ipcress File	Sidney J. Furie		Silva Screen / FILMCD 605 / 2002
1965	The Party's Over	Guy Hamilton		EMI / 07243 523073 2 6 / 1997
1965	Mister Moses	Ronald Neame		
1965	The Knack ...and How to Get It	Richard Lester		Quartet Records / QRSCE024 / 2011
1965	The Passion Flower Hotel	Gene Gutowski		Sony West End / SMK 66175 / ????
1965	The Newcomers (TV series)	Colin Morris	Fancy Dance	
1965	King Rat	Bryan Forbes		Intrada / ISC 434 / 2019
1965	Thunderball	Terence Young		EMI / 72435-80589-2-5 / 2003
1965	Four in the Morning	Anthony Simmons		Ember Records / NR 5029 / 2009
1966	The Chase	Arthur Penn	Columbia 4-43544: The Chase (2:44) / Saturday Night Philosopher (2:55)	Legacy / 515133 2 / 2004
1966	Born Free	James Hill		Film Score Monthly / FSM Vol.7 No. 10 / 2004
1966	The Wrong Box	Bryan Forbes		Intrada / Special Collection Volume 191 / 2011
1966	Vendetta		CBS 2390: Vendetta (2:01) / The Danny Scipio Theme (2:45)	
1966	The Quiller Memorandum	Michael Anderson	CBS 2451: Theme From "The Quiller Memorandum" – Wednesday's Child / Sleep Well My Darling	Intrada / Special Collection Volume 201 / 2012
1966	Dutchman	Anthony Harvey		
1967	You Only Live Twice	Lewis Gilbert		EMI / 72435-41418-2-9 / 2003
1967	The Whisperers	Bryan Forbes		Rykodisc / RCD 10720 / 1998
1968	Boom!	Joseph Losey		harkit records / HRKCD 8248 / 2008
1968	Petulia	Richard Lester		Film Score Monthly / FSM Vol. 8 No. 20 / 2005
1968	Deadfall	Bryan Forbes		Retrograde Records / FSM-80124-2 / 1997
1968	The Lion in Winter	Anthony Harvey		Legacy / CK 66133 / 1995
1969	The Appointment	Sidney Lumet		Film Score Monthly / FSM Vol. 6 No. 11 / 2003
1969	Midnight Cowboy	John Schlesinger		Quartet Records / QR434 / 2021
1969	On Her Majesty's Secret Service	Peter R. Hunt		EMI / 72435-41419-2-8 / 2003
1970	Monte Walsh	William A. Fraker		Film Score Monthly / FSM Vol. 2 No. 4 / 1999
1971	Murphy's War	Peter Yates		
1971	The Last Valley	James Clavell		Quartet Records / QR257 / 2016
1971	Walkabout	Nicolas Roeg		The Roundtable / PM001CD / 2016
1971	They Might Be Giants	Anthony Harvey		
1971	The Persuaders!	Val Guest	CBS 7469: Theme From 'The Persuaders' (2:10) / The Girl with the Sun in Her Hair (2:55)	
1971	Diamonds Are Forever	Guy Hamilton		EMI / 72435-41420-2-4 / 2003
1971	Mary, Queen of Scots	Charles Jarrott		Quartet Records / QR504 / 2022
1972	Follow Me!	Carol Reed		King Records / KICP 1476 / 2010
1972	The Adventurer			Universal Music Jazz France / 531 340 5 / 2009
1972	Alice's Adventures in Wonderland	William Sterling		Film Score Monthly / FSM Vol. 8 No. 20 / 2005
1973	A Doll's House	Patrick Garland		
1973	Orson Welles Great Mysteries			Universal Music Jazz France / 531 340 5 / 2009
1973	The Glass Menagerie	Anthony Harvey		
1974	Billy			
1974	The Tamarind Seed	Blake Edwards		Silva Screen / SILCD1647 / 2021
1974	Born Free (TV series)	Leonard Horn, Paul Krasny, Russ Mayberry		
1974	The Dove	Charles Jarrott		Intrada / ISC 313 / 2015
1974	The Man with the Golden Gun	Guy Hamilton		EMI / 72435-41424-2-0 / 2003
1975	Love Among the Ruins	James Costigan		
1975	The Day of the Locust	John Schlesinger		Intrada / ISC 367 / 2016
1976	Eleanor and Franklin	Daniel Petrie		
1976	Robin and Marian	Richard Lester		Prometheus Records / PCR 522 / 2008
1976	King Kong	John Guillermin		Film Score Monthly / FSM Vol. 15 No. 5 / 2012
1977	Eleanor and Franklin: The White House Years	Daniel Petrie		
1977	The White Buffalo	J. Lee Thompson		Quartet Records / QR267 / 2017
1977	The War Between the Tates	Lee Philips		
1977	The Deep	Peter Yates		Casablanca Records USA; Pye Records-Precision Tapes UK /1977; Intrada / Special Collection Volume 143 / 2010
1977	Young Joe, the Forgotten Kennedy	Richard T. Heffron		
1977	First Love	Joan Darling		La-La Land Records / LLLCD 1243 / 2013
1977	The Gathering	Randal Kleiser		
1978	The Betsy	Daniel Petrie		
1978	Game of Death	Robert Clouse		Silva America / SSD 1154 / 2003
1978	Starcrash	Luigi Cozzi		BSX Records / BSXCD 8846 / 2008
1979	The Corn Is Green	George Cukor		
1979	Willa	Joan Darling, Claudio Guzmán		
1979	Hanover Street	Peter Hyams		Varèse Sarabande / VCL 0309 1090 / 2009
1979	Moonraker	Lewis Gilbert		EMI / 7243 5 41425 2 9 / 2003
1979	The Black Hole	Gary Nelson		Intrada / D001383402 / 2011
1980	Night Games	Roger Vadim		Silva America / SSD 1154 / 2003
1980	Raise the Titanic	Jerry Jameson		
1980	Somewhere in Time	Jeannot Szwarc		La-La Land Records / LLLCD 1550 / 2021
1980	Touched by Love	Gus Trikonis		
1980	Inside Moves	Richard Donner		
1981	The Legend of the Lone Ranger	William A. Fraker		Intrada / ISC 420 / 2018
1981	Body Heat	Lawrence Kasdan		Film Score Monthly / FSM Vol. 15 No. 4 / 2012
1981	The Little Prince and the Aviator	Jerry Adler		
1982	Hammett	Wim Wenders		Silva Screen / SILCD1662 / 2023
1982	Murder by Phone	Michael Anderson		
1982	Frances	Graeme Clifford		Label X / LXSACD 1001 / 2005
1983	High Road to China	Brian G. Hutton		BSX Records / BSXCD 8864 / 2010
1983	Octopussy	John Glen		EMI / 7243 5 41450 2 5 / 2003
1983	The Golden Seal	Frank Zuniga		Intrada / Special Collection Volume 89 / 2008
1983	Svengali	Anthony Harvey		
1984	Mike's Murder	James Bridges		Prometheus Records / PCR 521 / 2009
1984	Until September	Richard Marquand		Kritzerland / KR 20018-9 / 2011
1984	The Cotton Club	Francis Ford Coppola		Geffen Records / CDGEF 70260 / 1984
1985	A View to a Kill	John Glen		EMI / 72435-41448-2-0 / 2003
1985	Jagged Edge	Richard Marquand		Varèse Sarabande / VCL 0916 1174 / 2016
1985	Out of Africa	Sydney Pollack		MCA Records / MCAD-11311 / 1995
1986	A Killing Affair	David Saperstein		
1986	Howard the Duck	Willard Huyck		Intrada / ISC 426 / 2019
1986	Peggy Sue Got Married	Francis Ford Coppola		Varèse Sarabande / VCL 1114 1152 / 2014
1986	The Golden Child	Michael Ritchie		La-La Land Records / LLLCD 1180 / 2011
1987	The Living Daylights	John Glen		EMI / 72435-41451-2-4 / 2003
1987	Hearts of Fire	Richard Marquand		
1988	Masquerade	Bob Swaim		Quartet Records / QR326 / 2018
1988	USA Today: The Television Show			

- Dances with Wolves (1990) US
- Chaplin (1992)
- Year of the Comet (1992) (rejected score)
- Ruby Cairo (1992) US
- My Life (1993) US
- Indecent Proposal (1993) US
- The Specialist (1994) US
- Cry, the Beloved Country (1995)
- Across the Sea of Time (1995) US
- The Scarlet Letter (1995) US
- Swept from the Sea (1997) US
- Mercury Rising (1998) US
- Playing by Heart (1998) US
- Goodbye Lover (1998) (rejected score)
- Thomas and the Magic Railroad (2000) (rejected score)
- Enigma (2001)
- The Incredibles (2004) (rejected demos)

=== Television film scores ===
- Elizabeth Taylor in London (Grammy award nomination) (1963)
- Sophia Loren in Rome (1964)
- The Glass Menagerie (1973)
- Love Among the Ruins (1975)
- Eleanor and Franklin (1976)
- Eleanor and Franklin: The White House Years (1977)
- The War Between the Tates (1977)
- Young Joe, the Forgotten Kennedy (1977)
- The Gathering (1977)
- The Corn Is Green (1979)
- Willa (1979)
- Svengali (1983)

=== Television themes ===
- Juke Box Jury (1959–1967)
- Dateline (1962)
- Impromptu (1964)
- The Newcomers (1965–1969)
- Vendetta (1966)
- The Persuaders! (1971–1972)
- The Adventurer (1972–1973)
- Orson Welles Great Mysteries (1973)
- Born Free (1974)
- USA Today: The Television Show (1988)

=== Musicals ===
- Passion Flower Hotel (1965)
- Lolita, My Love (1971), a musical comedy (text by Alan Jay Lerner) based on Vladimir Nabokov's novel Lolita
- Billy (1974)
- The Little Prince and the Aviator (1981)
- Brighton Rock (2004)

=== Other works ===
- Stringbeat (1961)
- Americans (1975)
- The Beyondness of Things (1999)
- Eternal Echoes (2001)
- The Seasons (no release date set)

=== Singles ===
(Excludes co-composed hits, e.g. Duran Duran's "A View to a Kill")

- "Hit and Miss" as The John Barry Seven plus Four, UK No. 10 (first charted 1960)
- "Beat for Beatniks" as The John Barry Orchestra, UK No. 40 (1960)
- "Never Let Go" as The John Barry Orchestra, UK No. 49 (1960)
- "Blueberry Hill" as The John Barry Orchestra, UK No. 34 (1960)
- "Walk Don't Run" as The John Barry Seven, UK No. 11 (1960)
- "Black Stockings" as The John Barry Seven, UK No. 27 (1960)
- "The Magnificent Seven" as The John Barry Seven, UK No. 45 (1961)
- "Cutty Sark" as The John Barry Seven, UK No. 35 (1962)
- "The James Bond Theme" as The John Barry Orchestra, UK No. 13 (1962)
- "From Russia with Love" as The John Barry Orchestra, UK No. 39 (1963)
- "Theme from The Persuaders! as John Barry, UK No. 13 (1971)

His four highest-charting hits all spent more than 10 weeks in the UK top 50.

== See also ==
- Category:Works by John Barry (composer)
- Spy music
