= John Amos =

American actor (1939–2024)

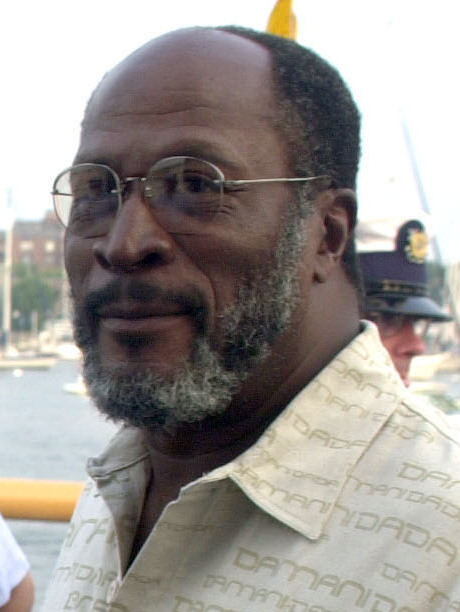
- Amos in 2001
- Born: John Allen Amos Jr. December 27, 1939; Newark, New Jersey, U.S.
- Died: August 21, 2024 (aged 84); Inglewood, California, U.S.
- Education: Long Beach City College; Colorado State University (BA)
- Occupation: Actor
- Years active: 1970–2024
- Known for: Kunta Kinte (adult) – Roots; James Evans Sr. – Good Times; Percy Fitzwallace – The West Wing
- Spouses: Noel J. Mickelson (m. 1965; div. 1975); Lillian Lehman (m. 1978; div. 1979)
- Children: 2

John Allen Amos Jr. (December 27, 1939 – August 21, 2024) was an American actor. He was best known for his role as James Evans Sr. on the CBS television series Good Times. His other well known roles were as the adult Kunta Kinte in the landmark miniseries Roots and for portraying Captain Meissner in Lock Up (1989) and Major Grant in Die Hard 2 (1990). His other television work includes The Mary Tyler Moore Show, a recurring role as Admiral Percy Fitzwallace on The West Wing, and the role of the Mayor of Washington DC Ethan Baker in the series The District. Amos was nominated for a Primetime Emmy Award and an NAACP Image Award. In film, he played numerous supporting roles in movies such as The Beastmaster (1982), Coming to America (1988), and Coming 2 America (2021).

== Early life ==
John Allen Amos Jr. was born in Newark, New Jersey on December 27, 1939. He was the son of John A. Amos Sr., an auto mechanic, and Annabelle Amos. Amos grew up in East Orange, New Jersey, and graduated from East Orange High School in 1958. He attended Long Beach City College and graduated from Colorado State University with a degree in sociology; he played for both schools' football teams.

Amos worked as a social worker in New York City.

== American Football career ==
In 1964, Amos signed a free agent contract with the Denver Broncos of the American Football League. Unable to run the 40-yard dash because of a pulled hamstring, he was released on the second day of training camp. He played for various teams during his career, the Canton Bulldogs (UFL 1964), Joliet Chargers (UFL 1964), Norfolk Neptunes (COFL 1965), Wheeling Ironmen (COFL 1965), Jersey City Jets (ACFL 1966), Waterbury Orbits (ACFL 1966), and the Victoria Steelers (COFL 1967). In 1967, Amos signed a free agent contract with the AFL's Kansas City Chiefs (AFL 1967). Coach Hank Stram told him, "You're not a football player, you're a man who is trying to play football."

== Acting career ==
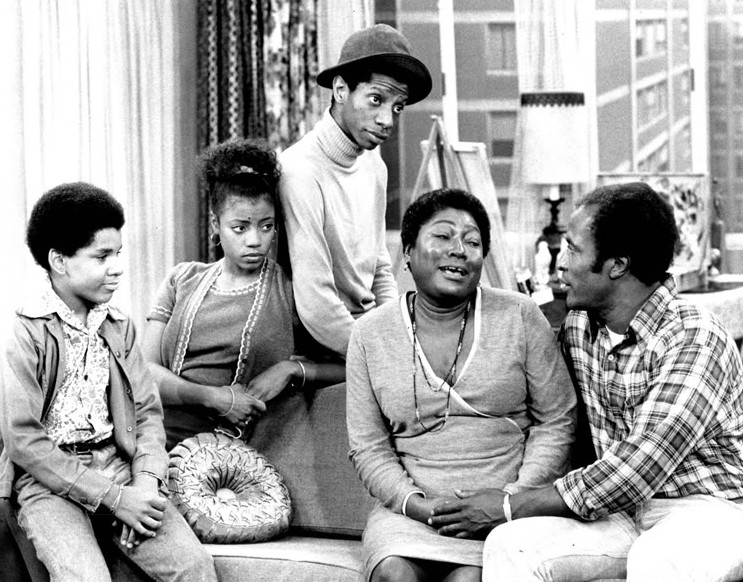
On Good Times (1974), L–R: Ralph Carter, BernNadette Stanis, Jimmie Walker, Esther Rolle, and Amos

Amos became first known in 1971 when he appeared with Anson Williams in a commercial for McDonald's. That same year, he had a small part in the cult film Vanishing Point, playing a radio engineer alongside Cleavon Little.

Amos' first major TV role was as Gordy Howard, the weatherman on The Mary Tyler Moore Show, from 1970 until 1973. After the death of Betty White in 2021, Amos and Joyce Bulifant (who played Marie Slaughter) were the last surviving cast members of the show, excluding child actors.

=== Good Times ===
Amos is best known for his portrayal of James Evans Sr., the husband of Florida Evans, on the American sitcom Good Times (1974–1976). He had previously appeared three times on the sitcom Maude as Florida's husband Henry, who had a different history than James. (On Maude, Florida and Henry lived in Harlem in New York City where he was a fireman and she got work as a maid. On Good Times, Florida and James lived in a housing project in Chicago where he worked odd jobs, and she was a housewife.) Although cast as a hardworking middle-aged father of three, Amos was 34 when the show began production in January 1974; he was only eight years older than the actor who played his oldest son, Jimmie Walker, and 19 years younger than his screen wife, Esther Rolle. Like Rolle, Amos wanted to portray a positive image of an African-American family struggling against the odds in a poor neighborhood, but he expressed dissatisfaction after he saw the premise slighted by a lower level of comedy on Good Times.

During his tenure on the sitcom, Amos openly clashed with the writers of the show, pointing to the scripts' lack of authenticity in portraying the African-American experience. He notably criticized what he felt was too much of an emphasis on Jimmie Walker's character J.J. and a lesser regard for the other two Evans children. He also criticized J.J.'s stereotypical buffoonish personality. This led to his dismissal by executive producer Norman Lear at the end of season 3 in 1976. In a 2017 interview, Amos said that the sitcom's writers did not understand African Americans. He told them, "That just doesn't happen in the community. We don't think that way. We don't act that way. We don't let our children do that." His character was killed off by the writers, leading to a memorable scene in which his screen wife, Rolle, screamed, “Damn! Damn! Damn!”

=== Films, music, and other TV roles ===
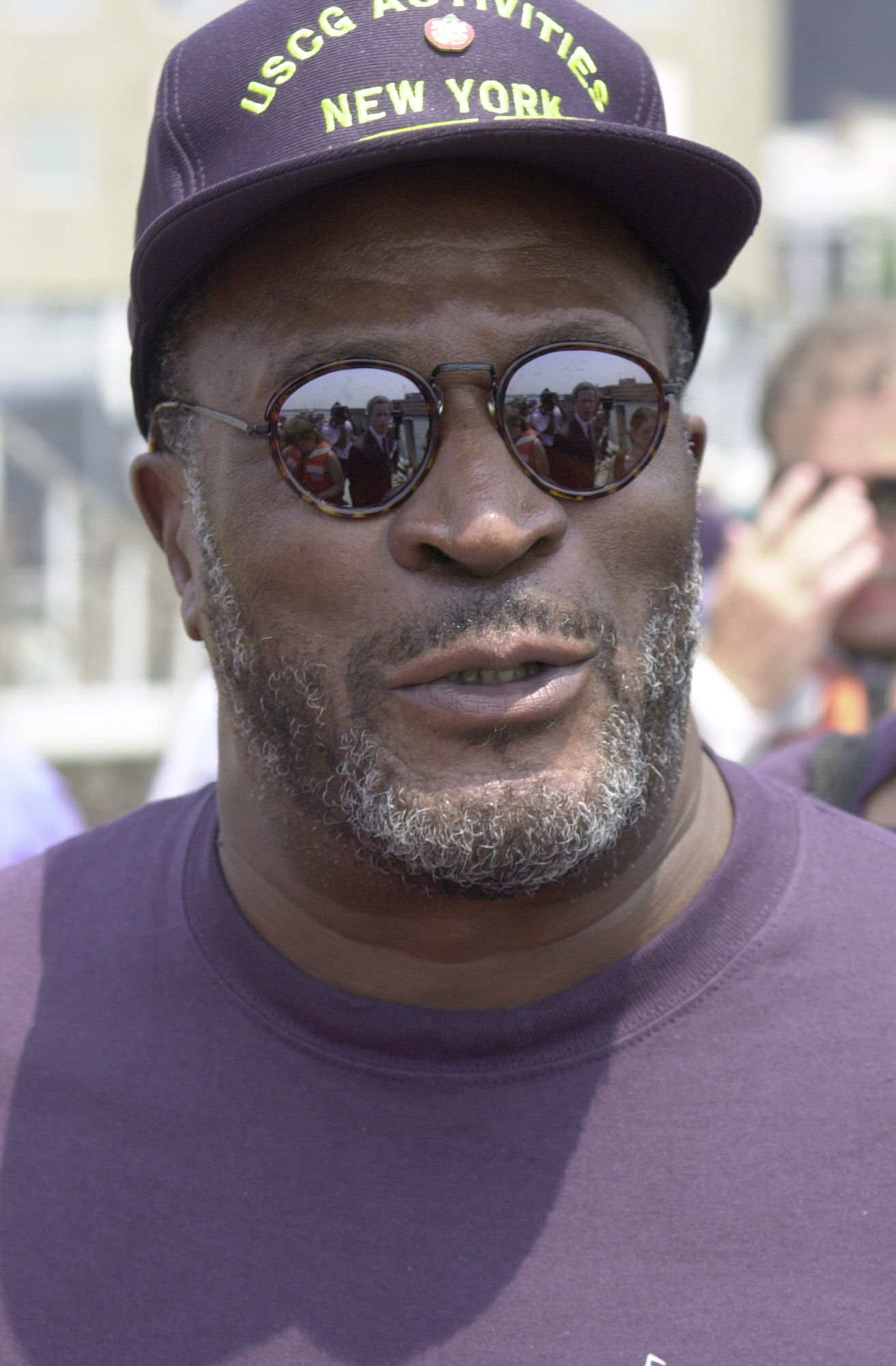
Amos in 2000

In 1977, Amos starred in the ABC-TV Miniseries Roots, as the adult Kunta Kinte, based on the book by author Alex Haley. In 1980, he starred in the television film Alcatraz: The Whole Shocking Story. Amos played an Archie Bunker-style character in the 1994 sitcom 704 Hauser, a modern spin-off of All in the Family, but it was canceled after only five episodes (in the series he played a different character than he did in the All in the Family spin-off Maude). He also portrayed Captain Dolan on the TV show Hunter from 1984 to 1985. He co-starred in the CBS police drama The District. Amos was a frequent guest on The West Wing, portraying Admiral Percy Fitzwallace, who serves as Chairman of the Joint Chiefs of Staff for most of the show. He played Buzz Washington in the ABC series Men in Trees. Amos co-starred with Anthony Anderson in the short-lived TV series All About the Andersons from 2003 to 2004. In 2010, Amos also appeared as recurring character Ed on Two and a Half Men, and in 2016 as another recurring character, also (coincidentally) named Ed, on the Netflix sitcom The Ranch. He guest-starred in a number of other television shows, including Police Story, The A-Team, The Cosby Show, The Fresh Prince of Bel-Air, In the House, Martin as Sgt. Hamilton Strawn (Tommy's father), Touched by an Angel, Psych, Sanford and Son, My Name Is Earl, Lie to Me, and Murder, She Wrote. He also appeared as a spokesman for the Cochran Firm (a national personal injury law firm).

Amos wrote and produced Halley's Comet, a critically acclaimed one-man play that he performed around the world. Amos performed in August Wilson's Gem of the Ocean on Broadway and later at the McCarter Theatre in Princeton, New Jersey.

Amos was featured in Disney's The World's Greatest Athlete (1973) with Tim Conway and Jan-Michael Vincent in his first starring film role, and also starred as Kansas City Mack in Let's Do It Again (1975) with Bill Cosby and Sidney Poitier. His other film appearances include Vanishing Point (1971), The President's Plane Is Missing (1973), Touched by Love (1980), The Beastmaster (1982), Dance of the Dwarfs (1983), American Flyers (1985), Coming to America (1988), Lock Up (1989), Two Evil Eyes (1989), Die Hard 2 (1990), and Ricochet (1991).

He appeared in the 1995 film For Better or Worse and played a police officer in The Players Club (1998). He played Uncle Virgil in My Baby's Daddy (2004), and starred as Jud in Dr. Dolittle 3 (2006). In 2012, Amos had a role in the movie Madea's Witness Protection, as Jake's father. He appeared in Ice Cube and Dr. Dre's 1994 video for "Natural Born Killaz". In 2009, he released We Were Hippies, an album of original country songs by Gene and Eric Cash.

In 2021, Amos starred in Because of Charley, as the patriarch of an estranged step-family riding out Hurricane Charley, the hurricane which tore through Florida in 2004. Also in 2021, he had a role in the Coming to America sequel, Coming 2 America.

Suits LA, the television show in which he made his final acting appearance, paid posthumous tribute to him with an episode entitled "Good Times," in which the characters Ted and Rick attempt to get him a star on the Hollywood Walk of Fame and Ted observes, "John Amos was the Sidney Poitier of television. He broke new ground for Black America and he was a father figure for all of America."

== Personal life ==
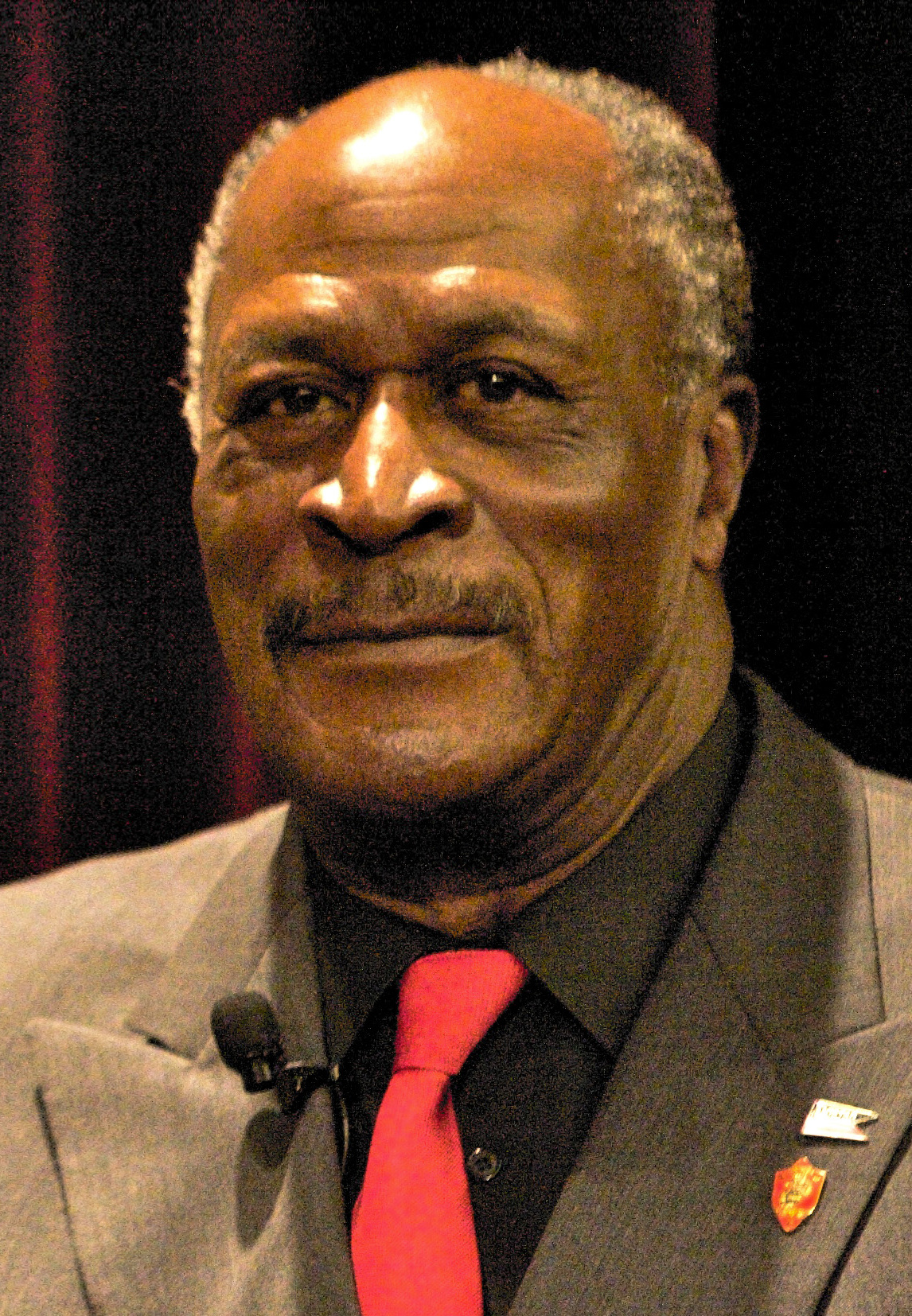
Amos in 2011

Amos was a veteran of the 50th Armored Division of the New Jersey National Guard and Honorary Master Chief of the United States Coast Guard. He was married twice. His first marriage, from 1965 to 1975, was to artist and equestrian Noel Mickelson. The couple had two children: Shannon Amos, a writer-producer and the founder of Afterglow Multimedia, LLC, and Grammy-nominated director K.C. Amos. Acrimonious disagreements between Shannon and K.C. Amos over the care given to their parents were documented by The Hollywood Reporter in 2023.

Amos' second marriage, in 1978–79, was to actress Lillian Lehman. He lived for many years in Tewksbury Township, New Jersey. In 2018, he moved to Westcliffe, Colorado, southwest of Pueblo. In 2023, Amos was hospitalized, and the Colorado Bureau of Investigation looked into accusations that Amos had been the victim of elder abuse. Amos left Colorado that same year, taking up residency in Los Angeles.

=== Death ===
Amos died of congestive heart failure at Centinela Hospital Medical Center in Inglewood, California, on August 21, 2024, at the age of 84. His death was not announced until October 1, 2024. His daughter, Shannon, was unaware that he had died until his death was reported by the media. His body was cremated nine days after his death.

== Awards ==
In addition to receiving an Emmy nomination for Roots, Amos was nominated for a CableACE Award, an NAACP Image Award, and a DVD Exclusive Award. He won three TV Land Awards for his roles on The Mary Tyler Moore Show, Good Times, and Roots.

In 2020, Amos was inducted into the New Jersey Hall of Fame.

== Filmography ==
=== Film ===
Year	Title	Role	Notes
1971	Vanishing Point	Super Soul's Engineer	Uncredited
1971	Sweet Sweetback's Baadasssss Song	Biker	Credited as Johnny Amos
1973	The World's Greatest Athlete	Coach Sam Archer	
1975	Let's Do It Again	MacArthur "Kansas City Mack" Clutch	
1980	Touched by Love	Tony	
1982	The Beastmaster	Seth	
1983	Dance of the Dwarfs	Esteban	
1985	American Flyers	Dr. Conrad	
1988	Coming to America	Cleo McDowell	
1989	Lock Up	Captain Meissner	
1990	Two Evil Eyes	Detective Legrand	Segment: "The Black Cat"
1990	Die Hard 2	Major Grant	
1991	Ricochet	Reverend Styles	
1991	Without a Pass	Blue Berry	
1993	Mac	Nat	
1993	Night Trap	Captain Hodges	
1995	For Better or Worse	Gray	
1995	Hologram Man	Wes Strickland	
1998	The Players Club	Officer Freeman	
2001	All Over Again	Coach Zeller	
2003	The Watermelon Heist	Old Man Amos	
2004	My Baby's Daddy	Uncle Virgil	
2004	Countdown	Admiral Melory	
2005	Shadowboxing	Hill	
2006	Dr. Dolittle 3	Jud Jones	
2007	Ascension Day	Henry	
2010	Lean Like a Cholo	"Slick"	
2011	Stills of the Movement: The Civil Rights Photojournalism of Flip Schulke	The Narrator	
2012	Zombie Hamlet	Edgar Mortimer	
2012	Madea's Witness Protection	Pastor Nelson	
2014	Act of Faith	Brady	
2015	Bad Asses on the Bayou	Earl	
2015	Mercy for Angels	God	
2015	Tamales and Gumbo	The Patron	
2016	Hauntsville	Mr. Kimball	
2019	Uncut Gems	Himself	
2021	Coming 2 America	Cleo McDowell	
2021	Because of Charley	Grandpa	
2021	Christmas in Miami	Chief Host	
2022	Me Time	Gil	
2023	The Last Rifleman	Lincoln Adams	

=== Television ===
Year	Title	Role	Notes
1970	The Bill Cosby Show	1st Salesman	as Johnny Amos; Episode: "Swann's Way"
1970–1977	The Mary Tyler Moore Show	Weatherman Gordon "Gordy" Howard	13 episodes
1971	The Funny Side	Minority Husband	6 episodes
1971–1972	Love, American Style	Bell Captain	2 episodes
1972	The New Dick Van Dyke Show	Mark Cooper	Episode: "The Harry Award"
1973	Sanford and Son	Luther	Episode: "A Visit from Lena Horne"
1973–1974	Maude	Henry Evans	Recurring role, 3 episodes
1974	The Tonight Show Starring Johnny Carson	Himself	1 episode
1974–1976	Good Times	James Evans Sr.	61 episodes
1976	Police Story	Sergeant Walt Kyles	1 episode
1976–1977	Future Cop	Officer Bill Bundy	7 episodes
1977	Roots	Older Kunta Kinte	3 episodes
1979	Mr. Dugan	Representative Dooley	Unaired pilot
1980	Alcatraz: The Whole Shocking Story	Ellsworth "Bumpy" Johnson	TV miniseries
1981	Here's Boomer	Charlie Foster	Episode: "Boomer Goes for the Gold"
1982	Insight	Josh Cameron	Episode: "Hang Tight, Willy Bill"
1983	The Love Boat	Duke Taylor	Episode: "The Zinging Valentine/The Very Temporary Secretary/Final Score"
1984	The A-Team	Reverend Taylor	Episode: "Pure-Dee Poison"
1984	Trapper John, M.D.	Inspector Roland Hackett	Episode: "The Fred Connection"
1984	Hardcastle and McCormick	Albie Meadows	Episode: "The Homecoming: Part 2"
1984–1985	Hunter	Captain Dolan	13 episodes
1986	One Life to Live	Bill Moore	2 episodes
1987	Murder, She Wrote	"Doc" Penrose	Episode: "Death Takes a Dive"
1987	Stingray	Roy Jeffries	Episode: "Blood Money"
1987	You Are the Jury	Sergeant Harold Borman	Episode: "The State of Oregon vs. Stanley Manning"
1988	Beauty and the Beast	Farrell	Episode: "The Alchemist"
1988	Bonanza: The Next Generation	Mr. Mack	TV movie
1988	The Cosby Show	Dr. Herbert	Episode: "The Physical"
1989	Gideon Oliver	Carl Manning	Episode: "Tongs"
1994	704 Hauser	Ernie Cumberbatch	6 episodes
1994–1995	The Fresh Prince of Bel-Air	Fred Wilkes	3 episodes
1995–1997	In the House	Coach Sam Wilson	12 episodes
1995	Touched by an Angel	Sheriff James Mackey	Episode: "The Hero"
1997	Martin	Sergeant Strawn	Episode: "Daddy Dearest"
1997	Walker, Texas Ranger	Pastor Roscoe Jones	Episode: "Sons of Thunder"
1998	King of the Hill	Glenn Johnson	Voice; Episode: "Traffic Jam"
1999–2004	The West Wing	Admiral Percy Fitzwallace	22 episodes
2000	Something to Sing About	Reverend Washington	TV movie
2000	The Outer Limits	Peter "Yas" Yastrzemski	Episode: "Zig Zag"
2000	Disappearing Acts	Mr. Swift	TV movie
2000–2001	The District	Mayor Ethan Baker	10 episodes
2002	American Masters	Dr. Bledsoe	Episode: "Ralph Ellison: An American Journey"
2003–2004	All About the Andersons	Joe Anderson	16 episodes
2006	Voodoo Moon	"Dutch"	TV movie
2006–2008	Men in Trees	"Buzz" Washington	27 episodes
2007	Psych	Uncle Burton Guster	Episode: "Meat Is Murder, But Murder Is Also Murder"
2008	My Name Is Earl	Joe	Episode: "Stole an RV"
2010	Two and a Half Men	Ed	3 episodes
2010	Royal Pains	Harrison Phillips	Episode: "Big Whoop"
2010	30 Rock	Himself	Episode: "Let's Stay Together"
2010	Lie to Me	Jim Weaver	Episode: "Smoked"
2012	NYC 22	Pappy Science	Episode: "Ransom"
2016–2017	The Ranch	Ed Bishop	4 episodes
2019	Ballers	Deacon Eller	2 episodes
2019	Your Pretty Face Is Going to Hell	War	Episode: "The Poor Horsemen of the Apocalypse"
2019	Live in Front of a Studio Audience	Fred Davis	Episode: "'All in the Family' and 'Good Times'"
2020	The Last O.G.	Uncle D	Episode: "Family Feud"
2022	The Righteous Gemstones	Buddy Lissons	Episode: "I Will Tell of All Your Deeds"
2025	Suits LA	Himself	Episode: "Seven Days a Week and Twice on Sunday" (Final acting appearance)
