= Santa's a Fat Bitch =

1994 song by Insane Clown Posse

Single by Insane Clown Posse

from the EP A Carnival Christmas
- Released: 1997
- Studio: The Fun House (Detroit, Michigan)
- Genre: Comedy hip hop, horrorcore Christmas
- Length: 4:22
- Label: Psychopathic
- Songwriters: Violent J; Shaggy 2 Dope; Mike E. Clark
- Producer: Mike E. Clark

Insane Clown Posse singles chronology
"Hokus Pokus" (1997)	"Santa's a Fat Bitch" (1997)	"How Many Times?" (1998)

"Santa's a Fat Bitch" is a song written and performed by American hip hop duo Insane Clown Posse from their 1994 extended play A Carnival Christmas. It was recorded at the Fun House in Detroit and produced by Mike E. Clark.

The song also appeared in ICP's compilation albums Forgotten Freshness (1995) and Forgotten Freshness Volumes 1 & 2 (1998), and was released in 1997 as the B-side on Kerrang! magazine's free 7-inch single of "Halls of Illusions".

Reaching a peak position of number sixty-seven on the US Billboard Hot 100, the song remained on the chart for a total of five weeks.

== Track listing ==
"Halls of Illusions" 7″ vinyl promo (Kerrang!) – UK release
No.	Title	Length
1.	"Halls of Illusions"	4:16
2.	"Santa's a Fat Bitch"	4:22
3.	"Red Christmas"	4:25

== Charts ==
Chart performance for "Santa's a Fat Bitch"
Chart (1997)	Peak position
US Billboard Hot 100	67
