= The Passion Flower Hotel =

1962 novel by Roger Longrigg

First edition

The Passion Flower Hotel is a novel by Rosalind Erskine (real name Roger Erskine Longrigg). It was published by Jonathan Cape in 1962. The story concerns a young girl going to an English girls' boarding school. In the dormitory, the girls discuss losing their virginity and decide that the best way is to set up a "service" for the local boys' school situated across the lake from them. The subject is treated in a light manner.

A sequel, Passion Flowers in Italy, was published by Simon & Schuster in 1964, and a third title, Passion Flowers in Business in 1965.

== Stage adaptation ==
It was adapted into a musical with music by John Barry, lyrics by Trevor Peacock and a book by Wolf Mankowitz. It was produced by Gene Gutowski, premiered at the Palace Theatre, Manchester, England, on 30 July 1965, transferring to the Prince of Wales Theatre, London, on 24 August 1965, and ran for 148 performances. The cast included Francesca Annis and Jeremy Clyde, as well as future stars such as Michael Cashman, Pauline Collins, Bill Kenwright, Nicky Henson, Hilary Dwyer, and Barry's future wife Jane Birkin.

== Film adaptation ==
A film loosely based on the story was made in 1978 in German under the title of Leidenschaftliche Blümchen starring Nastassja Kinski. A dubbed version was released in English under the title Passion Flower Hotel.
