= Because of Charley =

- Directed by: Jon Binkowski
- Written by: Jon Binkowski; Stephen DeWoody
- Produced by: Jon Binkowski
- Starring: John Amos; Joop Katana; Ashley Jones; Joshua Wade; Peg O'Keef; Clint Robinson; Erin Cline; Simon Needham
- Edited by: Jon Binkowski
- Distributed by: Freestyle Releasing
- Release date: April 9, 2021 (Florida Film Festival)
- Running time: 113 minutes
- Country: United States
- Language: English

Because of Charley is a 2021 American comedy-drama film directed by Jon Binkowski and starring John Amos, Joop Katana, Ashley Jones, Joshua Wade, Peg O'Keef, Clint Robinson, Erin Cline and Simon Needham. The film is set in Florida in 2004 when Hurricane Charley occurred.

== Cast ==
- John Amos as Grandpa
- Ashley Jones as Jesse
- Joshua Wade as David
- Peg O'Keef as Grammy
- Erin Cline as Leigh
- Clint Robinson as Michael
- Joop Katana as Danno
- Simon Needham as Ian

== Production ==
The film was shot in Central Florida in 2020 amid the COVID-19 pandemic.

== Release ==
The film premiered on April 9, 2021, at the Florida Film Festival. In September 2021, it was announced that Freestyle Releasing acquired North American rights to the film, which was released in digital platforms on October 5, 2021.

== Reception ==
Curt Wiser of OC Movies, TV & Streaming Reviews gave the film a positive review and wrote, "Overall, Because of Charley is a well drawn drama centered around a tragic historical event."
