= Spy music =

Musical style associated with espionage themes

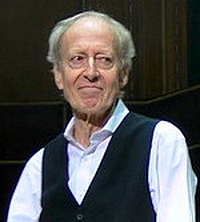
- Film score composer John Barry, known for composing the scores for the James Bond films
- Other names: Spy jazz
- Stylistic origins: Scores of spy films
- Cultural origins: 1960s
- Typical instruments: Strings, guitar

Spy music (also known as spy jazz) is a genre of music associated with the style of music commonly heard in the scores of spy films.

== Etymology ==
In 1994, Spy Magazine released Spy Magazine Presents: Spy Music, Vol. 1, which was a compilation album consisting of various artists that were "either inspired by spy films, or used as themes for the spy flicks themselves," according to Ritchie Unterberger of AllMusic.

== Characteristics ==
Spy music is largely influenced by the soundtracks of spy films, such as those composed by John Barry for the James Bond films. According to AllMusic, the soundtracks to spy films were "nearly inseparable from the film[s themselves] – especially in the case of the world's best-known secret agent, James Bond." Hallmarks of spy jazz include string sections, reverberated guitar work, and a generally dramatic aesthetic. The New Yorker stated that spy music is similar to surf music in terms of instrumentation, and also bears similarities to the music heard in spaghetti Westerns. An example of a composition in this style is "Americana" by Piero Piccioni. Additionally, NME said some of the styles on the album Melody's Echo Chamber border on spy jazz.

== See also ==
- Crime jazz
