= Crime jazz =

Jazz subgenre

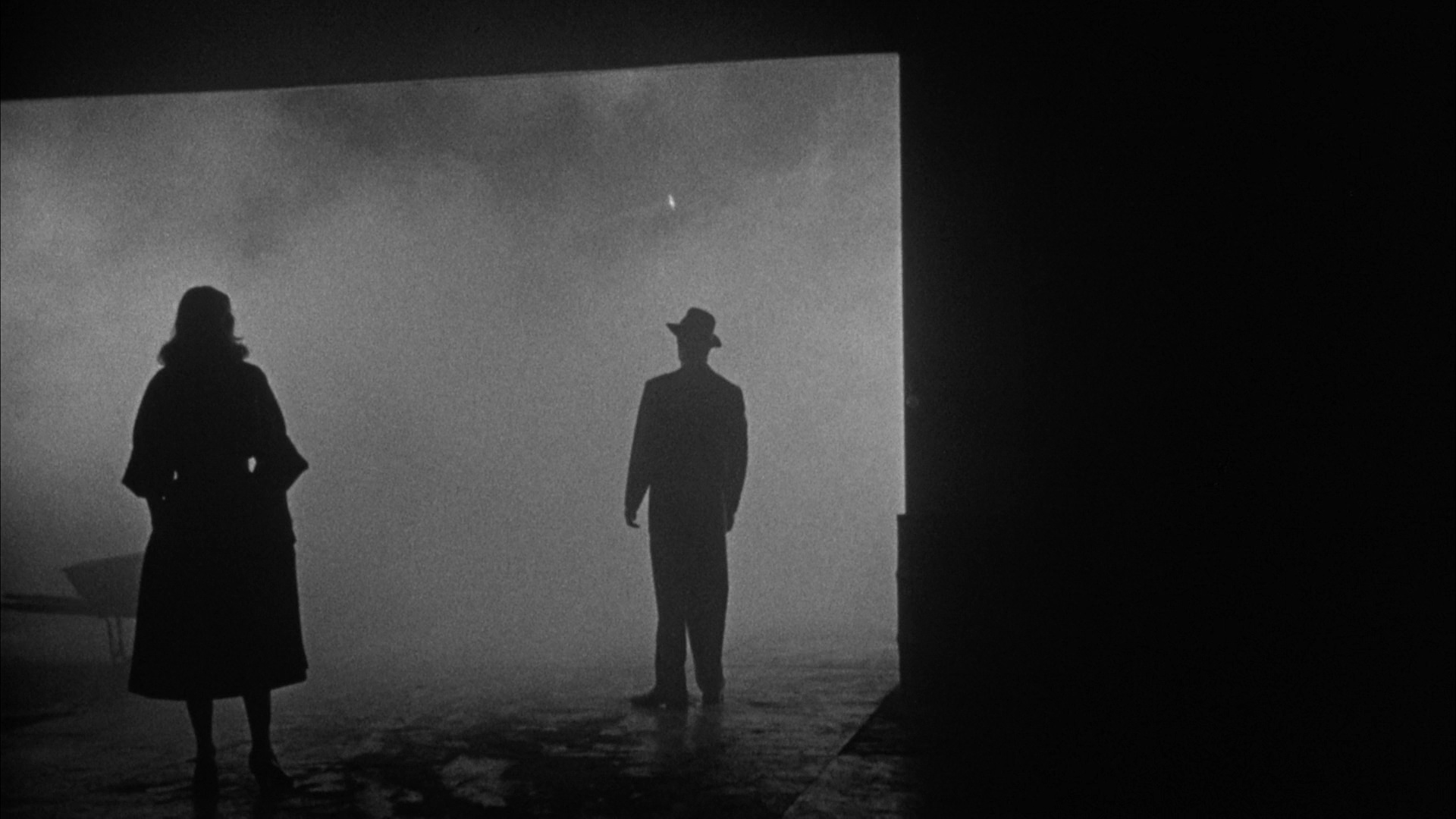
- Still image from the film noir The Big Combo
- Stylistic origins: Big band, bebop, hard bop, soundtracks of crime drama and film noir
- Cultural origins: 1920s, Harlem, New York City and 1940s and 1950s, Hollywood, Los Angeles
- Typical instruments: Saxophone, brass instruments, guitar

Crime jazz (also known as "noir jazz" and "guitar noir") is a subgenre of jazz music that bears similarities to the soundtracks of film noir. Blog site Boing Boing characterizes the style as "jazzy theme music from 1950s TV shows and movies in which very bad people do very bad things."

The music of Big Lazy has been described as crime jazz by Vintage Guitar. Some consider the music featured in the 1967 Spider-Man animated TV series to represent crime jazz. The theme song to the 1959 series Peter Gunn is among the most widely-known compositions in the style, according to Boing Boing. Other examples of musicians and composers who have performed works in this style include Pete Rugolo, Elmer Bernstein, Nelson Riddle and Henry Mancini and Count Basie.

== Etymology ==
Rhino Records released a compilation album titled Crime Jazz, which has since gone out of print.

== Characteristics ==
This style of music is associated with the soundtracks to TV crime dramas of the 1950s and 1960s, such as M Squad, which first aired in 1957. According to Roy Carr of Jazzwise: "Many of these particular soundtracks outlasted the vehicles which they originally served. Remember all of these soundtracks were recorded in Hollywood, where the sound of shiny fullblown brass sections, yearning saxophones and often frantic rhythm teams were performed by a highly dependable pool of regulars who, having frequently worked together, built up an affinity which had a positive impact on the end result." During the 1950s the growing popularity of the bebop and hard bop variants of jazz led to some studios to incorporate the styles into the soundtracks for films to give the score a more urban feel. According to blog site Boing Boing: "Although jazz was used for all sorts of movies and television shows, it seemed to meld best with stories of danger—hard-nosed detective tales, studies of urban corruption, or spy thrillers. While not exactly on the same level of artistic expression as the leading jazz artists of their respective times, these compositions nevertheless convey the emotions demanded by the shows they backed."

== History ==
Jazz music began to appear in the soundtracks of crime dramas as early as the 1940s. This trend continued into the 1950s, with notable examples including A Streetcar Named Desire, Private Hell 36, Touch of Evil and Sweet Smell of Success being notable examples. The association between jazz music and crime can be traced back to Prohibition in the United States. Jazz musicians such as Louis Armstrong and Duke Ellington would routinely play big band shows in underground clubs throughout Harlem that were operated by rum runners and the American Mafia. Examples of these clubs include the Cotton Club and Connie’s Inn, both of which were owned by Connie Immerman, who was involved in bootlegging.

The genre declined in the mid-1960s after movie soundtracks began to gravitate towards rock-based soundtracks more akin to the Beatles.

== See also ==
- Spy jazz
