= The Dove (1974 film) =

1974 film by Charles Jarrott

- Theatrical release poster
- Directed by: Charles Jarrott
- Screenplay by: Peter S. Beagle; Adam Kennedy
- Based on: Dove by Derek L.T. Gill; Robin Lee Graham
- Produced by: Gregory Peck
- Starring: Joseph Bottoms; Deborah Raffin
- Cinematography: Sven Nykvist
- Edited by: John Jympson
- Music by: John Barry
- Production company: St George Productions
- Distributed by: Paramount Pictures (US); EMI Films
- Release date: October 16, 1974 (Los Angeles)
- Running time: 105 minutes
- Countries: United States; United Kingdom
- Language: English
- Budget: $2 million
- Box office: over $3 million (gross)

The Dove is a 1974 American-British biographical film directed by Charles Jarrott. The picture was produced by Gregory Peck, the third and last feature film he produced.

The drama is based on the real-life experiences of Robin Lee Graham, a young man who spent five years sailing around the world as a single-handed sailor, starting when he was 16 years old. The story is adapted from Dove (1972), the book Graham co-wrote with Derek L.T. Gill about his seafaring experiences.

== Plot ==
The film tells of real-life Robin Lee Graham, a 16-year-old boy who sets sail in a 23-foot sloop in attempt to be the youngest person to circumnavigate the globe solo. He had planned the trip with his sailor father Lyle Graham for years.

On one of Robin's stops after setting sail, he meets and falls in love with the gregarious and attractive Patti Ratteree. After much banter, Patti decides to follow Robin throughout his long journey. She meets him in Fiji, Australia, South Africa, Panama and the Galápagos Islands.

As he travels around the globe, Robin experiences many adventures on the sea and land as he matures from a teenager to a young adult. Robin finds the trip a lonely experience, especially when the wind dies on him on the high seas. At one point he badly wants to quit the voyage but Patti (now his new wife) and Lyle encourage him to continue. At the end of the film, Robin sails into Los Angeles with crowds welcoming him home.

== Cast ==
- Joseph Bottoms as Robin Lee Graham
- Deborah Raffin as Patti Ratteree
- John McLiam as Lyle Graham
- Dabney Coleman as Charles Huntley
- John Anderson as Mike Turk
- Colby Chester as Tom Barkley
- Ivor Barry as Kenniston
- Setoki Ceinaturoga as Young Fijian
- Reverend Nikula as Minister
- Apenisa Naigulevu as Cruise Ship Captain
- John Meillon as Tim
- Gordon Glenwright as Darwin Harbour Master
- Garth Meade as South African Customs Official
- Peter Gwynne as Fred C. Pearson
- Cecily Polson as Mrs. Castaldi

== Background ==
=== Basis of film ===
Robin Lee Graham (born 1949) set out to sail around the world alone as a teenager in the summer of 1965. National Geographic Magazine carried the story in three issues from 1966 to 1970, and he co-wrote a book detailing his journey called Dove. Graham was just 16 when he set out from Southern California and headed west in his 24-foot Lapworth sailboat. In Fiji, he married his wife Patti Ratteree, and after almost five years, sailed back into his home port. After he and Patti attended Stanford University, they moved to Montana. He collaborated with writer Derek L.T. Gill on Dove, a book of the journey which became a best seller.

=== Development ===
Gregory Peck moved into film producing in the early 70s, following his dissatisfaction with some of his late 60s films such as Marooned and Mackenna's Gold, and the recutting of I Walk the Line. He decided to take time out from acting and work as a producer. His first effort, an adaptation of the play, The Trial of the Catonsville Nine, had not been a success so he spent six months reading material to find his next project.

Peck was told about the series of articles on Graham that were in National Geographic and that a book was being written about him. Peck read the book Dove while it was still in galleys. "I was attracted really because of the character of the boy", said Peck. "He was a very odd fella, an eccentric who sailed around the world at 16. Loners make interesting heroes." He also liked that it was "a strong adventure story."

Graham was reluctant to sell the film rights to Peck - he did not know who the actor was. However, he was persuade by his lawyer and his then wife Patti who admired the actor and felt he would not make a "dirty movie". However Graham said "I insisted that the film be made in such a way that it could be shown without embarrassment to family audiences. There would be no nudity, no provocative sexual scenes, no swearing or blasphemous language."

Peck optioned the screen rights for $10,000 of his own money. He knew Nat Cohen and Bernard Delfont of EMI Films from being on the board of Capitol Records. They gave him $150,000 to purchase the screen rights outright and to write a script. EMI wanted a US partner and Paramount agreed to come on board.

In May 1973 Cohen announced the film would be made as Here There Be Dragons as part of a slate of movies made by EMI worth £5 million. The film was budgeted at £1 million.

Filming began under the title of Here There Be Dragons. However, there was concern this would confuse audiences into thinking it was a martial arts film. Upon a Painted Ocean was considered as a title before selecting The Dove.

Director Charles Jarrott said the film would "make a positive statement about a youth who set out to do something and succeeded. It's not a Disney story, there is some abrasion to it."

"You can read one or two things into it, the father-son relationship being what it is in the picture", said Peck. "The movie will make you wonder why a kid would want to drop out, why he wasn't offered the kind of future he was interested in."

Jarrott later called the movie "an exercise in logistics" and came about because Peck "desperately wanted to make a film about an American winner."

The script was originally written by Graham's co author Derek Gill. Eventually four people worked on the script only two of whom got credit. The script was not finished when filming started on 25 May 1973 but Jarrott's contract specified a start date.

=== Casting ===
Peck says at one time they discussed casting "one or two rock stars" in the lead roles "but they're kind of practiced and slick and a little too sophisticated. We looked for naturalness, sympathetic personalities and original personalities. We looked for kids who weren't hindered by too much self confidence, people that had chemistry." Actors considered included David Cassidy, Richard Thomas and Edward Albert Jr. Joseph Bottoms, then best known for the TV movie version of Winesburg, Ohio, was cast in the lead role.

"The whole picture depends on the kid", said Jarrott. "If you're stuck on the other side of the world and he doesn't work out, you can't recast the part."

Deborah Raffin, a model who had been in the film of 40 Carats, was cast as Robin's girlfriend Patti.

=== Shooting ===
Filming started in Fiji on 25 May 1973 and finished at Del Mar in California on 28 September. During filming it became apparent that the film - originally budgeted at $1.5 million - would need another $600,000 to finish and this was obtained from Paramout.

The film is a travelogue of sorts and the producers filmed on location throughout the world over a four-month period with a 32-person crew. Filming locations included: Suva, Fiji; Darwin, Northern Territory, Fremantle, Western Australia; Cape Town, South Africa; Lourenço Marques, Mozambique; Panama Canal, Panama; Ecuador; and Los Angeles.

Instead of sailing a boat around the world, Peck bought nine identical boats and shipped them to nine different locations.

While largely accurate, the film fictionalizes a few elements. Robin and Patti actually married about halfway through his journey, in South Africa, but the film saves their marriage for the finale, and places it in the Galápagos Islands. In addition, Robin actually sold Dove in Saint Thomas, about 3/4 of the way through his journey, and replaced her with the larger Return of Dove, but the film has him keep the same boat for the duration of his journey.

"It was a terrific gamble", said Peck. "It was exhilarating. I feel I play a role in every scene, even if I don't direct it or act in it. I helped to shape it. I made the thing happen in the first place. Whatever has happened, over the past two years I've certainly known I've been alive."

Graham was invited to a preview screening. He wrote "the film was sensitively and, in many scenes, really beautifully made... I couldn't fault the acting. Joseph Bottoms had patently made a real study not only of sailing a small craft but of my personality. Patti was no less pleased with Deborah Raffin's performance." Graham asked for some minor changes to the story including language used which Peck agreed to.

== Reception ==
=== Box office ===
The film performed poorly at the box office in the USA but did better in Europe. According to Peck's biographer, the success of the film in Australia and Japan helped the film earn a profit.

=== Critical response ===
Critic Nora Sayre, film critic for The New York Times, thought the film was too wholesome, so much so that Sayre wanted harm to come to the characters. Yet she appreciated Sven Nykvist's cinematography and wrote, "The Dove ... is probably far too wholesome for most of the families I know, although there may be a radiant audience lurking just outside the realms of my acquaintance ... Joseph Bottoms, as the young sailor, smiles too much in the first half of the movie; after that, he cries too much. His initial overwhelming sunniness turns the viewer into a sadist: You're glad when his cat gets killed or grateful when a shark appears in the ocean. Deborah Raffin, as his winsome girlfriend, is rarely allowed to stop laughing and wagging her head; the two grin and glow at each other until you yearn for a catastrophe."

Others liked the film. Film critics Frederic and Mary Ann Brussat, who reviewed the film much later after the film's release on their website Spirituality and Practice, appreciated the film and its message, and wrote, "Producer Gregory Peck was perceptive when he decided to make a film based on the true life on the youngest person to circumnavigate the world alone ... Graham's exploits and his accompanying struggle to sort out his feelings about himself and his loyalties to family and girlfriend are fascinating and provocative."

The staff at Variety magazine said, "... an odyssey which provides nautical chills and thrills (as well as breathtaking scenics) aplenty ... Pic really takes off when he meets the girl (played with gauche hesitation at first, but then with beauty and considerable charm by Deborah Raffin) ... Their yes-no yes-no-yes affair is nicely handled."

Peck gave up producing following the death of his son Jonathan in 1975 and returned to acting. In 1976 he said he would not produce another film "until I had done a very thorough job indeed of examining every aspect of the story. I think I would reject and reject and reject until I found something that would be consistently exciting, suspenseful, funny—whatever it was supposed to be—throughout, from start to finish, which is more than we achieved with The Dove.”

=== Awards ===
Wins

- Golden Globes: Golden Globe Award for Most Promising Male Newcomer, Joseph Bottoms

Nominations

- Golden Globes: Golden Globe Award for Best Original Song, John Barry (composer) and Don Black (lyricist); for the song "Sail the Summer Winds"

== Release ==
The film opened in the United States in September 1974. Paramount released the film on VHS in 1992. Network Distributing released the film on Blu-Ray in the UK on April 5, 2021.

== Soundtrack ==
Soundtrack cover

An original motion picture soundtrack of the film was released in 1974 by ABC Records and contained thirteen tracks (00:31:43). On May 1, 2001, a CD was released on the Artemis record label. The song "Sail the Summer Winds", sung by Lyn Paul, was nominated for a Golden Globe Award for Best Original Song and was a top selling hit in England. It hovered just outside the top 50 of the UK Singles Chart for four months. The score was written by composer John Barry.

Side 1

1. "The Dove (Main Title)" (03:05)
2. "Sail The Summer Winds" (Vocal by Lyn Paul) (03:09)
3. "Hitch-hike To Darwin" (02:14)
4. "Patty and Robin" (02:20)
5. "Here There Be Dragons" (02:44)
6. "Mozambique" (02:15)

Side 2

1. "The Motorbike and the Dove" (01:24)
2. "Xing'mombila" (02:09)
3. "Alone On The Wide, Wide Sea" (03:52)
4. "Porpoise Escort" (02:30)
5. "After The Fire" (01:46)
6. "Sail The Summer Winds" (Vocal by Lyn Paul) (02:21)
7. "The Dove (End Title)" (01:54)

A bootleg CD version of the soundtrack with the 13 original tracks was released January 28, 2009 by Harkit Records in the UK. The album was transferred from an LP.

On March 31, 2015 Intrada released the officially licensed CD premiere the score, newly re-mixed and re-mastered from original 8-channel session masters

Track list

Original 1974 soundtrack album
1) The Dove (Main Title) (3:05)
2) Sail The Summer Winds+ (3:11)
3) Hitch-Hike To Darwin (2:14)
4) Patty And Robin (2:20)
5) Here There Be Dragons (3:09)
6) Mozambique (2:16)
7) The Motorbike And The Dove (1:24)
8) Xing’mombila (2:10)
9) Alone On The Wide, Wide Sea (3:52)
10) Porpoise Escort (2:31)
11) After The Fire (1:50)
12) Sail The Summer Winds+ (2:21)
13) The Dove (End Title) (1:55)
The Extras – Stereo Album Mixes (No EFX)
14) Xing’mombila – Part 1 (No EFX) (0:25)
15) Xing’mombila – Part 2 (No EFX) (0:33)
16) The Dove (End Title) (No EFX) (1:49)
The Extras – Previously Unreleased Mono Score Cues
17) Sorta Romantic (1:14)
18) Rotten Cat (0:20)
19) Starting Again (2:28)
20) Near Miss (0:22)
21) From The Depths (2:17)
22) Unknown Seas (1:12)
23) Alone On The Wide, Wide Sea (Complete) (5:00)
24) His Decision (3:11)
+Lyricist: Don Black – Vocalist: Lyn Paul

== See also ==
- List of American films of 1974
