= Elizabeth Taylor in London =

1963 television special

Elizabeth Taylor in London is a CBS-TV television special broadcast on 6 October 1963. It was directed by Sidney Smith and produced by Philip D'Antoni and Norman Baer, with a script by S. J. Perelman and Lou Solomon.

== Format and setting ==
The 58 minute film featured Elizabeth Taylor on location in London, reminiscing about her birthplace and reciting several famous English poems and speeches. These were filmed against such as backdrops as Westminster Bridge, Battersea Park, The Houses of Parliament and a London Blitz bomb damaged church in the East End of London.

== Recitations ==
The recitations included:

- Composed upon Westminster Bridge, September 3, 1802 by William Wordsworth
- How Do I Love Thee? from Sonnets from the Portuguese by Elizabeth Barrett Browning
- William Pitt, 1st Earl of Chatham's 18 November 1777 speech on the American Revolution (" You cannot conquer America... If I were an American, as I am an Englishman, while a foreign troop was landed in my country, I never would lay down my arms — never — never — never!").
- Queen Elizabeth I's Speech to the Troops at Tilbury
- An excerpt from Queen Victoria's diary on the death of Prince Albert
- The "London can take anything" speech of Winston Churchill

== Music ==
The music was composed by John Barry, who was nominated for a 1964 Emmy Award for Outstanding Original Music. The original album has been re-released on CD with many of the tracks available in the public domain on various John Barry collections. The tune "Greensleeves" occurs throughout the score. Unusually, it was not Barry but Johnnie Spence who conducted the score for the film and album release. Like Barry, Spence was signed to Ember Records: as Matt Monro's musical director, he had conducted the version of Lionel Bart’s From Russia with Love song used in the film (scored by Barry) earlier in 1963.

== Purpose and reception ==
In addition to showcasing Taylor at the height of her popularity, the show informed Americans of English history and London locations. Her lover Richard Burton (who would soon become her fifth husband) coached Taylor on her delivery of the speeches.

Taylor was paid US$250,000 (equivalent to approximately $2,629,076 in today's funds) - at the time the highest price ever paid for a person to be on television. The BBC paid US$28,000 for broadcast rights and it was shown on Christmas Eve that year. Reviewing the programme in The Listener, however, Anthony Burgess was scathing about Taylor in general and Barry's score in particular:

... a waste of public money, an impertinence and an insult, an invitation to a feast of nothing... The score was Hollywood-inspirational, overblown variations on Greensleeves, a brassy sepulchre. Elgar and Walton would have brought the sound of real London, and real London was not wanted... [Taylor] was a jaw-dropping vision of totally meaningless allure – Yves St Laurent icing, delectability of fairy gold, the poor little box of tricks of Zuleika Dobson. The pretence of being interested in London’s poets was disgusting (‘I am an actress and my medium is words’), the mockery of patrician English positively dirty. Miss Taylor’s own idiolect belongs nowhere. Her general quality of rootlessness would be pathetic did she not claim roots in Hampstead... and somehow imply that she had soared above her place of origin. ‘Elizabeth Taylor in London’: she does us too much honour, she does really. The year is over. I can, with confidence, vote this the most deplorable programme of the year.

Nonetheless, the success of the show led to a follow-up, Sophia Loren in Rome, from the same production team the following year.
