= The Take Out Move =

2021 American comedy film

- Film poster
- Directed by: Andrew Simonian
- Written by: Andrew Simonian
- Produced by: Andrew Simonian
- Starring: Nick Grace; Jeremy Sless; Alexandra Miles
- Cinematography: Garen Mirzaian
- Edited by: Andrew Simonian
- Production company: Standard Media Company
- Distributed by: Freestyle Digital Media
- Release dates: July 2021 (Reel Comedy Fest); September 13, 2022
- Running time: 74 minutes
- Country: United States
- Language: English
- Budget: $3,500

The Take Out Move is a 2021 American comedy film written and directed by Andrew Simonian and starring Nick Grace, Jeremy Sless, and Alexandra Miles.

Freestyle Digital Media acquired North American rights to The Take Out Move and released the film across digital and video-on-demand platforms on September 13, 2022. The film is currently available to watch on Amazon Prime Video.

Made for only $3,500, the film is Simonian's first full-length feature and is based on his 1997 short film of the same name. The film was shot in 4K on a Panasonic Lumix GH5 DSLR. It was filmed in and around Los Angeles. Simonian included his parody book, Bi-Curious George, in a brief scene in the movie.

The Take Out Move earned positive reviews from critics and positive notices at various film festivals.

== Plot ==
Mr. Fanst gives an assignment to Whalen - he should take out the girl Amber by 8 O'clock, and only after completing certain tasks. If Whalen is successful, he will be accepted, and failure implies termination.

Whalen follows Amber as she walks all over town. When she opens the door to a building, his head is hit and he is knocked out. When he wakes up, he is at her home on the couch. She tells him that she rents out the guest room in the house, and the owners are away for a month. The door bell rings and Davis enters with flowers, asking for Melissa. Whalen and Davis recognize each other, and start bad mouthing one another. Amber decides that both need rest and shuts them in a room, where they fight for a bit. She tells them to clean out her garage and place all items into the trunk of the car. She asks them to try out a vegan dish, but it turns out to contain chicken and "Yak juice". They find that it tastes horrible, and are startled to learn that there are two more courses. She also gets them to do really strange things for her - like modeling for her painting while hugging each other naked. She sings terribly while playing the Ukulele, and orders them to clear her cat litter.

They all go on a car ride and arrive at a park. Amber addresses Davis as "Steven", asks him to beat up "Gary", who is actually Whalen. Davis pretends that Amber is his sister and kisses her. They drive back home, and she tells them that her list of tasks is done. Whalen and Davis agree that the winner of a contest will take Amber out. After the contest is indecisive, they fight each other, with Amber joining it as well before leaving to get ready for her date.

The doorbell rings and Mr. Fanst enters and says he's taking Amber out, as they've been dating each other for eight months now. It is revealed that Whalen and Davis were trying to enter the Omega Fraternity, but they've both been dismissed by Mr. Fanst. In the end, they order take out and eat at their place.

== Cast ==
- Nick Grace as Davis
- Jeremy Sless as Whalen
- Alexandra Miles as Amber
- Zack Kozlow as Mr. Fanst
- Kaia Placa as Coffee Shop Girl

== Reception ==
=== Critical response ===
On Rotten Tomatoes it has a score of 75% based on reviews from 8 critics. The film also received a 9-out-of-10 score from Film Threat which called it "A delightful, very humorous tale expertly brought to life by a talented cast and crew. Plus, the ending is too perfect for words!" and four-stars from MovieReviews101 which said "Amazing creativity! Proves you can make great entertainment on a micro-budget!".

=== Accolades ===
- WINNER - Best Feature Film -- 2021 Reel Comedy Fest (United States).
- WINNER - Best Feature Film -- 2021 Rome International Movie Awards (Italy).
- WINNER - Best Feature Film -- 2021 Poor Life Choices Comedy Film Festival (United States).
- WINNER - Best Comedy Feature -- 2021 Hong Kong Indie Film Festival (Hong Kong).
- WINNER - Best Comedy Feature -- 2021 Midwest Action Fest film festival (United States).
- WINNER - Best Comedy Feature -- 2021 Kyiv Film Festival (Ukraine).
- WINNER - Best First Time Feature -- 2021 Philadelphia Independent Film Festival (United States).
- WINNER - Best Feature Film Silver -- 2021 Dark Comedy Film Festival (United States).
- WINNER - Best Feature Film, Made For Less Than $5000 -- Monkey Bread Tree Film Awards (United Kingdom).
- WINNER - Best Midnight Film -- 2021 Cult Critic Movie Awards (India).
- WINNER - Best Narrative Feature Silver -- 2021 Virgin Spring Cinefest (India).
- WINNER - Best Actor, Jeremy Sless -- 2021 Reel Comedy Fest film festival (United States).
- FINALIST - Best Director -- 2021 Lit Laughs International Comedy Film Festival (United Kingdom).
- FINALIST - Best Feature -- 2021 Lit Laughs International Comedy Film Festival (United Kingdom).
- FINALIST - Best Feature -- 2021 Vancouver Independent Film Festival (Canada).
- SEMI-FINALIST - Best Feature -- 2021 GELOS Comedy Film Festival (Russia).
- NOMINEE - Best Director -- 2021 Maverick Movie Awards (United States).
- NOMINEE - Best Directorial Debut -- 2021 ME Film Festival (United States).
- NOMINEE - Best Ensemble Performance -- 2021 Maverick Movie Awards (United States).
- NOMINEE - Best Actor, Nick Grace -- 2021 Reel Comedy Fest film festival (United States).
- NOMINEE - Best Editing -- 2021 Reel Comedy Fest film festival (United States).
- NOMINEE - Best Editing -- 2021 Maverick Movie Awards (United States).
- NOMINEE - Best Music -- 2021 Maverick Movie Awards (United States).
- OFFICIAL SELECTION -- 2021 New York Flash Film Festival (United States).
- OFFICIAL SELECTION -- 2021 CKF International Film Festival (United Kingdom)
- OFFICIAL SELECTION -- 2021 Toronto Independent Film Festival of Cift (Canada).
- OFFICIAL SELECTION -- 2021 Kansas City FilmFest International (United States).
- OFFICIAL SELECTION -- 2021 Austin International Art Festival (United States).
- OFFICIAL SELECTION -- 2021 Calgary Independent Film Festival (Canada).
- OFFICIAL SELECTION -- 2021 Malibu Film Festival (United States.)
- OFFICIAL SELECTION -- 2021 Maracay International Film & Video Festival (Venezuela).
- OFFICIAL SELECTION -- 2021 Spring Grove Caledonia Film Festival (United States).
- OFFICIAL SELECTION -- 2021 Arpa International Film Festival (United States).
