= Braker =

1985 television film directed by Victor Lobl

- Genre: Crime; Drama
- Directed by: Victor Lobl
- Starring: Carl Weathers; Joseph Bottoms
- Music by: Brad Fiedel
- Country of origin: United States
- Original language: English

Production
- Cinematography: Roger Sherman Jr.
- Running time: 90 minutes
- Production companies: Blatt-Singer Productions; Centerpoint Productions; MGM/UA Television

Original release
- Network: ABC
- Release: April 28, 1985

Braker is a 1985 American made-for-television crime drama film starring Carl Weathers and Joseph Bottoms. It was intended as a pilot for a series which was never produced. It was broadcast on ABC on April 28, 1985.

== Plot ==
Harry Braker is a tough veteran cop. Rookie detective Eddie Kelso is his inexperienced partner. They are both drawn in to investigate the murder of Kate Taylor, a music video editor. The investigation is linked to both the music and adult-film industries.

== Cast ==
- Carl Weathers as Lieutenant Harry Braker
- Joseph Bottoms as Eddie Kelso
- Anne Schedeen as Lieutenant Polly Peters
- Alex Rocco as Orsini
- Randall "Tex" Cobb as R.E. Packard
- Peter Michael Goetz as Captain Joyce
- Dann Florek as Hayes
- Tracey Ross as Janice
- Shanna Reed as Dede Drummond
- Ed O'Neill as Danny Buckner
- Ian McShane as Alan Roswell
- Kristoffer Tabori as Bruce Wines
- Gwen Humble as Kate Taylor
- Robert Pastorelli as Forensics Specialist
- Enrique Castillo as Booker
