= Joseph Bottoms =

American actor

- Occupation: Actor
- Years active: 1973–present
- Known for: The Dove; Holocaust; The Black Hole
- Spouse(s): Delilah Andison (m. 1980, divorced) Dianna Louise Diels (m. 1994; div. 2007)
- Relatives: Timothy Bottoms (brother); Sam Bottoms (brother)

Joseph Bottoms is an American actor who won the 1975 Golden Globe Award for New Star of the Year for his role in The Dove. He is also well known for his roles in the television miniseries Holocaust and Disney's The Black Hole.

== Career ==
Bottoms made his screen debut in the television movie Trouble Comes to Town. A year later, he played the role of Robin Lee Graham in The Dove, a real-life story about a teenaged sailor's voyage around the world.

In the 1978 miniseries Holocaust, he starred as Rudi Weiss, a German Jew who joins the Jewish partisans.

A year later, he appeared in The Black Hole, a science-fiction film that grossed over $35 million at the U.S. box office. In 1981, he made his Broadway debut in Fifth of July. The play made its Broadway debut at the New Apollo Theatre on November 5, 1980, directed by Mason with Jeff Daniels reprising the role of Jed, Christopher Reeve as Ken and Swoosie Kurtz as Gwen.

In 1984, he starred with Kirstie Alley in Blind Date. From 1985 to 1986, he was a series regular on Santa Barbara. In 1990, he began a guest arc on the Canadian television series Street Legal. He played the second Cal Winters in Days of Our Lives in 1991. In 1998, he was cast as a series regular in The Net.

His latest screen appearance was in 1999 in the TV series V.I.P..

== Personal life ==
Bottoms is the brother of actors Timothy Bottoms, Sam Bottoms, and Ben Bottoms. He has been married twice and twice divorced. Since 1999, he has been running the Bottoms Art Galleries in Santa Barbara that include his father's sculptures.

== Filmography ==
Film
Year	Title	Role	Notes
1974	The Dove	Robin Lee Graham	Golden Globe Award for New Star of the Year – Actor
1976	Crime and Passion	Larry	
1977	High Rolling	Texas	
1978	Holocaust	Rudi Weiss	
1979	The Black Hole	Lieutenant Charlie Pizer	
1980	Cloud Dancer	Tom Loomis	
1981	King of the Mountain	Buddy	
1981	Surfacing	Joe	
1983	The Sins of Dorian Gray	Stuart Vane	
1984	Blind Date	Jonathan Ratcliff	
1988	Open House	Dr. David Kelley	
1988	Born to Race	Al Pagura	
1991	Inner Sanctum	Baxter Reed	
1992	Liar's Edge	Dave Kirkpatrick	
1992	Treacherous Crossing	Kenneth Gates	
1997	Snide and Prejudice	Therapist Himmler	
1998	Joseph's Gift	Simon Keller	
2019	Cicada Song	Ken	

Television
Year	Title	Role	Notes
1973	Trouble Comes to Town	Billy Keith	TV movie
1973	Winesburg, Ohio	George Willard	TV movie
1974	Unwed Father	Peter	TV movie
1976	Stalk the Wild Child	Cal, as a young man	TV movie
1978	Family	Seth Oliver	1 episode; "A Friend of the Family's"
1978	Holocaust	Rudi Weiss	TV mini-series
1978	Return Engagement	Steward Anderman	TV movie
1979	Disneyland	Major Effects	1 episode; "Major Effects"
1981	The Intruder Within	Scott	TV movie; Drillers on an oil rig near Antarctica discover that they have accidentally brought up several prehistoric eggs. One egg hatches and becomes an unstoppable creature.
1982	Side by Side: The True Story of the Osmond Family	George Osmond	TV movie
1983	I Married Wyatt Earp	The Driver	TV movie
1983	Wishman	Dr. Alex MacGregor	TV movie
1984	Celebrity	Mack Crawford	TV mini-series
1984	Time Bomb	Daniel 'Dan' Picard	TV movie
1985	Murder, She Wrote	Mickey Shannon	1 episode; "Murder at the Oasis"
1985	Braker	Eddie Kelso	TV movie
1985–1986	Santa Barbara	Kirk Cranston	Series regular
1987	Shades of Love: Make Mine Chartreuse	Steve	TV movie
1987	Island Sons	Joe Faraday	TV movie
1987	CBS Summer Playhouse	Dr. Martin Wilde	1 episode; "Doctors Wilde"
1988	Cop Killer	Lewis	TV movie
1988	The Highwayman	Bonham	1 episode; "Till Death Duel us Apart"
1990	CBS Schoolbreak Special	Jack Kingston	1 episode; "Maggie's Secret"
1990	Flair	Matt Lee	TV mini-series
1990–1991	Street Legal	Peter Garland	5 episodes
1991	Road to Avonlea	Edwin Clark	1 episode; "May the Best Man Win"
1991	Days of Our Lives	Carl Winters 2	
1992	Gunsmoke: To the Last Man	Tommy Graham	TV movie
1992	The Young Riders		1 episode; "The Road Not Taken"
1997	Walker, Texas Ranger	Tom Wilson	2 episodes; "Last of a Breed: Part 1", "Last of a Breed: Part 2"
1998–1999	The Net	Shawn Trelawney	Series regular
1999	Profiler	Bobby O'Hara	1 episode; "Seduction"
1999	V.I.P.		1 episode; "Stop or Val's Mom Will Shoot"

Theatre
Year	Title	Role	Notes
1981	Fifth of July	Ken	
