= Freestyle Releasing =

American independent film distributor

Freestyle Releasing, LLC
- Type: Subsidiary
- Industry: Entertainment
- Predecessor: Entertainment Studios Motion Pictures
- Founded: 2004; 22 years ago
- Founders: Susan Jackson; Mark Borde; Mike Doban
- Headquarters: Los Angeles, California, U.S.
- Services: Film distribution
- Revenue: US$4.20 million
- Number of employees: 25
- Parent: Allen Media Group
- Divisions: Freestyle Digital Media
- Website: freestyledigitalmedia.tv

Freestyle Releasing, LLC is an American independent film distribution company based in Los Angeles, California, founded in 2004, specializing in releasing low budget films theatrically. Unlike most distributors, Freestyle Releasing does not put up any prints and advertising money for its releases, leaving advertising costs to production companies.

== History ==
Freestyle Releasing was founded in 2004 by Susan Jackson, Mark Borde and Mike Doban, formerly at United Artists Theaters. By January 2006, Jackson started the DVD label Freestyle Home Entertainment as an adjunct for additional leeway in its deal making. The company booked Winter Passing and Find Me Guilty for Yari Film Group in 2006. Jackson in 2010 formed Freestyle Digital Media, a film aggregator for the video on demand market.

By May 2011, Doban left to be chief operating officer at Sycamore Entertainment Group, a film prints and advertising (P&A) financing firm. Jackson died in October 2014. In October 2015 Byron Allen's Entertainment Studios acquired Freestyle for an undisclosed amount "said to be sealed for high-eight figures".

== Units ==
- Freestyle Digital Media, founded in 2010, a film aggregator for the video on demand market with an output deal with Netflix.
- Turtle's Crossing, independent producer sales company, which was founded by Jackson in 1999 and represented producers in selling their films

Freestyle had a service distribution deal with Jeff Clanagan for a line of African-American movies called Code Black.

== Selected releases ==
- Trois (2000)
- Dot the i (2003)
- Spin (2003)
- Fighting Tommy Riley (2004)
- Hair Show (2004)
- Riding the Bullet (2004)
- Modigliani (2004)
- An American Haunting (2005)
- Preaching to the Choir (2005)
- The Illusionist (2006)
- The Heart Specialist (2006)
- The Haunting of Molly Hartley (2008)
- Sarah Landon and the Paranormal Hour (2007)
- D-War (2007)
- Bottle Shock (2008)
- Me and Orson Welles (2008)
- Delgo (2008)
- The Collector (2009)
- My One and Only (2009)
- I Hope They Serve Beer In Hell (2009)
- N-Secure (2010)
- Crazy on the Outside (2010)
- The Nutcracker in 3D (2010)
- Crooked Arrows (2012)
- The Oogieloves in the Big Balloon Adventure (2012)
- God's Not Dead (2014)
- Left Behind (2014)
- Woodlawn (2015)
- Hell and Back (2015)
- Camera Store (2016)
- Angelica (2017)
- After Louie (2018)
- Danger One (2018)
- Supervized (2019)
- The Believer (2021)
- Range Roads (2021)
- Because of Charley (2021)
- Curse of Aurore (2021)
- Allswell in New York (2022)
- The Take Out Move (2022)
- The Oath (2023)
- What the Hell Happened to Blood, Sweat & Tears? (2023)
- City of Love (2023)
- America's Family (2023)
- A Perfect Day for Caribou (2024)
- How to Break a World Record (2024)
- Darla in Space (2024)
- It's Coming (2024)
- Filthy Animals (2024)
- Step Back, Doors Closing (2024)
- Alone in Venice (2025)
- Love, Danielle (2025)
- Hello Beautiful (2026)
