= Eternal Echoes =

Studio album by John Barry
- Released: 22 October 2001
- Recorded: Abbey Road Studios/Angel Recording Studios, London 2000, 2001
- Genre: Classical
- Length: 43:24
- Label: Decca
- Producer: John Barry

John Barry chronology
Enigma (2001)	Eternal Echoes (2001)

Eternal Echoes is the name of John Barry's final solo album. It was his follow-up recording to The Beyondness of Things, an original solo album of independent material not connected to any film. The composer described the 11 pieces of Eternal Echoes as comprising "an album of sounds, of places and of objects that have always existed and always will exist. They are without beginning or end. They are infinite in our past and future."

The album was inspired by the poetry of Barry's friend, John O'Donohue. Initially, the composer conceived the project as a cycle of songs based on O'Donohue's poems. But it ended up being a purely orchestral recording performed by the English Chamber Orchestra. The album also features soloists David White on saxophone and Tommy Morgan on harmonica. The critical reception was rather modest at the time of the album's release. Commercially, Eternal Echoes was not as successful as The Beyondness of Things either.

== Track listing ==
1. "Eternal Echoes" - 4:25
2. "Returning Home" - 4:12
3. "Crazy Dog" - 3:03
4. "Slow Day" - 3:03
5. "Fred and Cyd" - 4:06
6. "Blessed Illusion" - 4:08
7. "Lullabying" - 3:17
8. "Winning" - 3:56
9. "Get Over It" - 3:54
10. "First Steps" - 3:47
11. "Elegy" - 5:37
