= Touched by Love =

- Theatrical release poster
- Directed by: Gus Trikonis
- Screenplay by: Hesper Anderson
- Based on: To Elvis, With Love by Lena Canada
- Produced by: Michael Viner
- Starring: Deborah Raffin; Diane Lane; Michael Learned
- Cinematography: Richard H. Kline
- Edited by: Fred Chulack
- Music by: John Barry
- Production company: Rastar
- Distributed by: Columbia Pictures
- Release date: April 17, 1980
- Running time: 94 minutes
- Countries: United States; Canada
- Language: English
- Budget: $2.5 million
- Box office: $1.8 million

Touched by Love (originally titled To Elvis, With Love) is a 1980 American film directed by Gus Trikonis, starring Diane Lane and Deborah Raffin.

First released to theaters in April 1980, the film was based on the book To Elvis, With Love by the real-life therapist, Lena Canada, in which she presented the correspondence between her patient Karen Brown and Elvis Presley as true.

== Plot ==
Therapist Lena Canada tries a novel approach with a girl named Karen Brown, who is dealing with cerebral palsy and depression. She encourages Karen to write to her favorite singer Elvis Presley. Karen eventually receives a reply, and they become pen pals. The interaction leads to an immediate improvement in her daily outlook.

== Cast ==
- Deborah Raffin as Lena Canada
- Diane Lane as Karen Brown
- Michael Learned as Dr. Bell
- John Amos as Tony
- Cristina Raines as Amy
- Mary Wickes as Margaret
- Clu Gulager as Don Fielder

== Reception ==
Deborah Raffin was nominated for both a Golden Globe Award for Best Actress — Motion Picture Drama at the 38th Golden Globes and a Golden Raspberry Award for Worst Actress for her performance. Hesper Anderson's screenplay was also nominated for the Golden Raspberry Award for Worst Screenplay at the 1st Golden Raspberry Awards.
