= A Carnival Christmas =

- Cover to the original edition of the album

EP by Insane Clown Posse
- Released: December 6, 1994
- Recorded: 1994
- Genre: Horrorcore
- Labels: Psychopathic Records; Island Records (reissue)
- Producer: Mike E. Clark

Insane Clown Posse chronology
The Terror Wheel (1994)	A Carnival Christmas (1994)	Forgotten Freshness (1995)

Alternative cover
- 1997 reissue

Professional ratings
Review scores
Source	Rating
AllMusic	2.5/5 stars

A Carnival Christmas is the third EP by American hip hop group Insane Clown Posse, released on December 6, 1994, by Psychopathic Records. It was reissued in 1997 by Island Records with alternate artwork. The reissue removed the EP's final two tracks. The first two songs on the EP are included in the compilation Forgotten Freshness Volumes 1 & 2. It is the fifth overall release by Insane Clown Posse.

== Production ==
"Santa Killas" contains a sample from the Cher song Gypsys, Tramps & Thieves. "Santa Killas" featured a guest verse by Mike E. Clark and Fink the Eastside G, a local rapper. ICP had a falling out with Fink after he stole money from Psychopathic Records.

== Legacy ==
"Santa Killas" has the first known use of the Juggalo slang "Whoop whoop!" which later became a greeting among fans. "Santa Killas" and "It's Coming" were removed from the EP when it was reissued by Island Records. ICP explained that the tracks were "outdated". "It's Coming" is a teaser for ICP's then-upcoming album, Riddle Box, which was the third Joker's Card. In October 2016, it was announced that ICP will be rereleasing the EP on vinyl in late 2016.

== Track listing ==
Original release
No.	Title	Length
1.	"Santa's a Fat Bitch"	4:22
2.	"Red Christmas"	5:15
3.	"Santa Killas" (featuring Mike E. Clark and Fink the Eastside G)	5:57
4.	"It's Coming"	4:09
Total length:		19:44

Island reissue
No.	Title	Length
1.	"Santa's a Fat Bitch"	4:22
2.	"Red Christmas"	5:13
Total length:		9:37

== Personnel ==
- Violent J – vocals, composer
- Shaggy 2 Dope – vocals, turntables
- Fink the Eastside G – guest vocals
- Mike E. Clark – turntables, production, guest vocals, engineer, mixing
