= Robin Lee Graham =

American sailor (born 1949)

- Born: March 5, 1949 (age 77); Orange, California, U.S.
- Occupations: Sailor and later carpenter
- Known for: Held the record as the youngest person to sail solo around the world (with stops and assistance)

Robin Lee Graham (born March 5, 1949) is an American sailor. He set out to sail around the world alone as a teenager in the summer of 1965. National Geographic magazine carried the story in installments (October 1968, April 1969, October 1970).

At age sixteen, Graham sailed alone from California to Hawaii on July 21, 1965. He continued heading west in his 24-foot sloop. He was originally given two kittens for company (Joliette and Suzette), and kept two or three cats throughout the entire journey (ending his travels with Kili, Pooh, and Piglet). He married along the way and, after almost five years, ended his journey in Los Angeles. He and his wife, Patti Ratterree, briefly attended Stanford University, then settled in Montana.

Graham's book about his voyage, Dove, was published in 1972. His voyage was depicted in a film, The Dove. A follow-up book, Home Is The Sailor, was published in 1983.

== The route ==
=== Pacific leg ===
After a shakedown cruise from San Pedro, California, to Hawaii, Dove left Ala Wai Harbor in Honolulu on September 14, 1965. Graham's first landfall was 14 days later at Fanning Island, a British-controlled atoll. His next planned stop was Pago Pago on the Island of Tutuila in American Samoa. A fierce squall dismasted Dove and left her unable to reach Pago Pago. Under jury rig, Dove set course for Apia on Upolu, Western Samoa. Five months later the repaired Dove sailed to Pago Pago to wait out the hurricane season.

On May 1, 1966, Graham sailed Dove to the Vavaʻu Group in Tonga. On June 21, Dove sailed to Fiji: first to Fulanga in the Lau Group, then Kabara and then on to Suva in the Viti Levu Group. Dove next made its way through the Yasawa Group, including the Naviti, Waialailai, Waia, Nalawauki, Tavewa, and Yasawa islands. It was in Fiji that he met Patti Ratterree (born c. 1944), a fellow American traveler who was "stopping to work at various places and living mainly by her wits."

On October 22, Dove set sail for the New Hebrides, arriving at the capital, Port Vila, four days later. On November 20, Dove pulled into Honiara on Guadalcanal in the Solomon Islands. While in the Solomons, Robin visited Florida Island, Savo Island and Tulagi Island. After one of Dove's slowest passages, landfall was made at Port Moresby, New Guinea on March 24, 1967.

Dove left New Guinea on April 18 and arrived in Darwin, Australia on May 4.

=== Indian Ocean leg ===
On July 6, 1967, Graham sailed Dove out of Darwin and made 1,900 nautical miles (3,500 km) in 18 days to reach Direction Island in the Cocos Islands. Eighteen hours out of the Cocos Islands, Dove was again dismasted during a brief storm. Graham sailed under jury rig for 2,300 nmi (4,300 km) to reach Port Louis Harbor, Mauritius. After repairs, Dove made for Réunion Island and then sailed 1,450 nmi (2,690 km) to Durban, South Africa, arriving there on October 21.

Graham spent nine months in South Africa, calling on ports along the southern edge of the continent including East London, Port Elizabeth, Plettenberg Bay, Knysna, Stilbaai, Struisbaai, Gordon's Bay and finally Cape Town. He married his girlfriend and went on a honeymoon at Kruger National Park.

=== Atlantic Ocean leg ===
On July 13, 1968, Dove left Cape Town and sailed toward the northern coast of South America. On August 5, Dove made landfall in Clarence Bay, Ascension Island. A week later, Graham sailed Dove out of Clarence Bay and towards Suriname. On August 31, Dove sailed up the Suriname River to the city of Paramaribo.

On October 12, 1968, Dove sailed out of the mouth of the Suriname River and headed to Barbados. After a month in Barbados, Graham's new boat, Return of Dove, was sailed down Fort Lauderdale, Florida to Saint Thomas, U.S. Virgin Islands. Graham sailed Dove from Barbados to Saint Thomas and sold her before continuing his trip in the bigger Return of Dove on November 20, 1969. Eight days later, Graham reached the San Blas Islands, where he spent two months exploring. After spending Christmas and New Year's Day in Cristobal in the Canal Zone, Return of Dove sailed through the Panama Canal with Robin, Patti and the mandatory Panama Canal Company pilot aboard and reaching Balboa on January 17, 1970. Robin then visited the Galapagos Islands. In April 1970 he ended his voyage at Long Beach, California where he had started from 1,739 days and 30,600 miles earlier.

== After the journey ==
About two months after ending his trip, Graham's daughter, Quimby, was born.

He attended Stanford University for a semester.

Graham and his wife sold the Maverick automobile that Ford Motor Company had given him and used the money to buy a retired postal van. They moved to a mountain property near Kalispell, Montana where they built a log home. In 1972 they moved closer to town and started building a larger log home. The skills learned led Graham to pursue a career as a builder and furniture maker. He and his wife had a second child, a son named Ben.

In 1982, he helped skipper a sailboat delivery from Hawaii to California with his father, Lyle, in the crew. This trip helped cement a reconciliation between the two. Their relationship had been strained since near the end of the attempted circumnavigation and started recovering when Lyle helped with the construction of one of Robin's homes.

In 1983 with co-author Derek Gill, Graham wrote a follow-up book titled Home is the Sailor.

== The boats: Dove and Return of Dove ==
Robin started his journey on the original Dove, a 24-foot Lapworth 24 sloop. On reaching the Caribbean, Dove was replaced by Return of Dove, a 33-foot Allied Luders sloop.

Dove remained in and was sailed about the British Virgin Islands after Graham sold her. She sank in Hurricane Hugo in 1989.

The Return of Dove was found in Hawaii by Mark and Beverly Langley in 2000. They restored her in 2001. She was sold again in 2004 and is believed to still be in Hawaii.

== Bibliography ==
- Robin Lee Graham (1973). The Boy Who Sailed Around the World Alone. Golden. ISBN 0-307-16510-8.
- Robin Lee Graham (1972). Dove. HarperCollins. ISBN 0-06-011603-X.
- Paperback reprint: Robin Lee Graham (1991). Dove. Harper Paperbacks. ISBN 0-06-092047-5.
- Robin Lee Graham, with Derek Gill (1983). Home Is the Sailor. Harper Collins. ISBN 0-06-015154-4.

== See also ==
- List of youth solo sailing circumnavigations
