= Gus Trikonis =

Actor, film director, film producer, television director

- Born: Kostas Tritchonis; November 21, 1937 (age 88); New York City, NY, U.S.
- Occupations: Actor, film director, film producer, screenwriter, television director
- Years active: 1961–2003
- Spouses: Goldie Hawn (m. 1969; div. 1976) Barbara Andrews (m. 1978; died 2012)

Kostas "Gus" Tritchonis (born November 21, 1937) is a Greek-American actor, dancer, and director.

== Career ==
Trikonis began his career as an actor and dancer, notably appearing in the 1961 film West Side Story as Indio, one of the "Sharks", as well as dancing with Debbie Reynolds and Grover Dale to the frantic "He's My Friend" in 1964's The Unsinkable Molly Brown. Although originally unbilled, on December 3, 1968, Trikonis got his second biggest exposure in front of any audience (the first being in the aforementioned West Side Story) as one of two main (out of five) male dancers who do Elvis Presley's choreography as he sings a Gospel medley as part of a widely watched NBC-TV Special entitled "Elvis".

As a director, Trikonis handled several projects from the late 1960s to the early 1980s, mostly low-budget "exploitation films". He made several films for Roger Corman at New World Pictures; Corman called Trikonis one of the best young directors he had ever worked with. His films included The Student Body.

From the 1980s to the mid-1990s Trikonis mostly directed television series. He directed episodes of television series including Baywatch, The Flash, Quantum Leap, Hunter, Beauty and the Beast and Wiseguy.

== Personal life ==
Trikonis was married to actress Goldie Hawn from 1969 to 1976; he was her first husband and they have the same birthday (in different years). He was later married to costume designer Barbara Andrews from 1978 until her death in 2012 and they had one child together: a son Nicolas, born in 1981. His sister Gina also appeared in West Side Story as Graziella, Riff's girlfriend, later becoming a costumer and costume/wardrobe supervisor.

== Filmography ==
Actor

Year	Title	Role	Notes
1960	Bajour	Steve	
1961	West Side Story	Indio	
1963	The Alfred Hitchcock Hour	Gordie Sykes	Episode "Diagnosis Danger"
1964	The Unsinkable Molly Brown	Joe	
1964	Pajama Party	Pajame Boy #13	
1966	The Sand Pebbles	Restorff	
1967	The St. Valentine's Day Massacre	Rio	
1968	The Hellcats	Scorpio	

Director (selection)

- Five the Hard Way / The Sidehackers (1969)
- Supercock (1975)
- The Swinging Barmaids (1975)
- The Student Body (1976)
- Nashville Girl (1976)
- Moonshine County Express (1977)
- The Evil (1978)
- She's Dressed to Kill (1979) (TV movie)
- Touched by Love (1980)
- Elvis and the Beauty Queen (1981) TV movie)
- Take This Job and Shove It (1981)
- Dance of the Dwarfs (1983)
- Malice in Wonderland (1985)
