= It's Coming (film) =

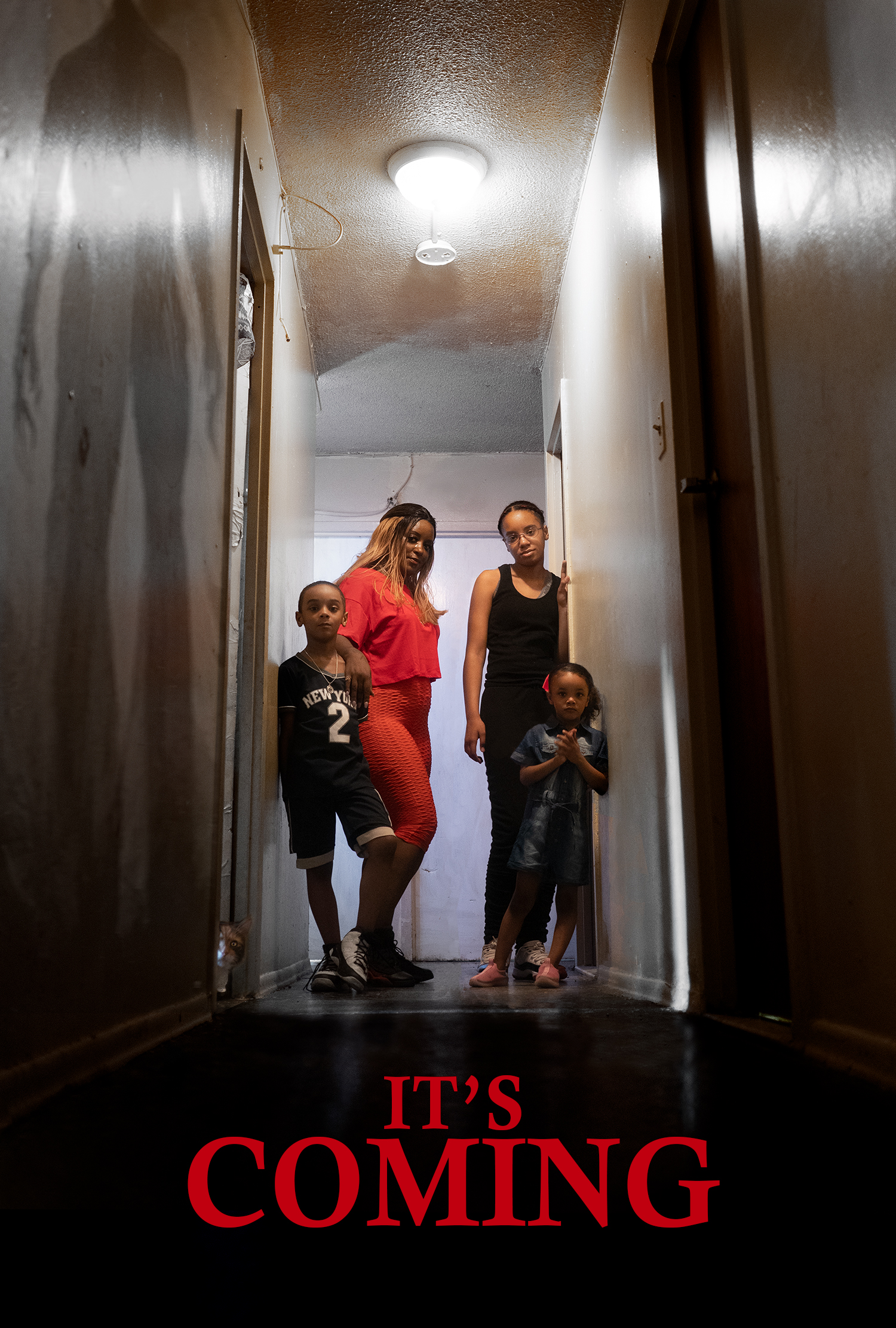
- Theatrical release poster
- Directed by: Shannon Alexander
- Produced by: Shannon Alexander
- Production company: Early Autumn
- Distributed by: Freestyle Releasing
- Release dates: April 29, 2023 (Hot Docs); November 12, 2024 (United States)
- Running time: 88 minutes
- Country: United States
- Language: English

It's Coming is a 2023 American documentary film directed by Shannon Alexander that follows a family reporting encounters with unexplained phenomena in their New York City home. The film documents what the film-maker considers the family's encounters with unexplained supernatural and paranormal entities and their attempts to understand these occurrences.

== Synopsis ==
The documentary chronicles Ashley Roland-White and her family's reported experiences with unexplained occurrences in their Brooklyn home. Through interviews and observational footage, the film explores how the family copes with and seeks to understand these phenomena, while addressing cultural barriers they face in seeking help.

== Release ==
The film had its world premiere at Hot Docs International Documentary Festival on April 29, 2023. Freestyle Digital Media, part of Freestyle Releasing, acquired distribution rights to the film and released it digitally in the United States on November 12, 2024.

== Reception ==
On the review aggregator website Rotten Tomatoes, It's Coming holds a 100% approval rating, based on 11 reviews, with an average rating of 6.4/10.

In a mixed review for Film Threat critic Bobby LePire wrote, "It’s Coming differentiates itself from the slew of paranormal investigations/ghost-hunting documentaries by being as matter-of-fact as possible. No fuzzy shadows dance across the scene. The presentation is as by-the-numbers as one can get, which adds a realism that makes it stand apart. The desperation in Roland-White’s voice when discussing her child’s experiences is undeniable, making it easy to believe her fears. While skeptics may question the lack of visual 'ghost action,' the documentary stands out as a gripping exploration of maternal instincts against a backdrop of the unknown." LePire gave the film a score of 7.5/10, noting its emotional weight despite its quiet, subdued style.

Writing for At Home In Hollywood, Lisa Johnson Mandell said "Alexander takes a refreshingly balanced approach" and noted that "It's Coming succeeds not by trying to convince viewers of the existence of the paranormal, but by presenting an honest portrait of a family living with what they believe to be supernatural phenomena."

Kate DeJonge of Grimoire of Horror wrote that "Alexander thoughtfully explores this key component, asking Ashley direct questions about why being Black makes it harder to ask for spiritual help. She candidly discusses the stigmas involved, making a solid case for her reluctance without discussing racism."

Sun Coast News critic Lee Clark Zumpe described the documentary as "mesmerizing," emphasizing that "The very fact that he doesn't appear to inject uncanny elements makes the documentary more disquieting — and, in some ways, more credible." Zumpe praised how "Throughout the film, curious anomalies are captured on video or audio. The director doesn't underscore any of these as evidence: A few occurrences are repeated in slow-motion, but Alexander wisely declines to state emphatically that he has managed to capture evidence of the supernatural. Instead, he puts the footage in front of the viewer, obliging them to make that determination."

Staci Lynn Wilson of Women In Horror commended how "Alexander's direction strikes the perfect balance between skepticism and sympathy, creating a documentary that is as much about breaking stigmas as it is about breaking curses," adding that "what makes this documentary genuinely creepy is how Alexander frames the everyday domestic sphere as a battlefield between maternal instinct and malevolent forces."

Writing for The Toronto Guardian Michelle Ormsby noted how the film "broaches topics of intersectionality, generational trauma, spirituality and stigma," concluding that "This unique documentary is unlike any other and will leave you questioning how reliable your senses are in detecting the supernatural forces at play around you."
