= It's Coming =

- Heroes episode
- Episode no.: Season 3 Episode 9
- Directed by: Greg Yaitanes
- Written by: Tim Kring
- Production code: 309
- Original air date: November 17, 2008

Guest appearances
- Kristen Bell as Elle Bishop; Jamie Hector as Knox; Brea Grant as Daphne Millbrook; Blake Shields as Flint Gordon, Jr.; Ntare Mwine as Usutu; Robert Forster as Arthur Petrelli

Episode chronology
← Previous "Villains"	Next → "The Eclipse"
- Heroes season 3

"It's Coming" is the ninth episode of the third season of the NBC superhero drama series Heroes and forty-third episode overall. The episode aired on November 17, 2008.

== Plot ==
Following on from the previous episode, Arthur Petrelli is holding Hiro's head, while Hiro screams. Ando makes an unsuccessful attempt to rescue Hiro, during which Arthur lets go of Hiro, distracted by a painting of a new eclipse made by Usutu. Hiro and Ando make their escape, but Ando finds Hiro has lost his memories and believes himself to be a 10-year-old. Ando helps him relearn how to use his powers and Hiro uses them to teleport the duo to a Japanese Bowling Alley. After several attempts to teach Hiro how to use his powers correctly, Hiro teleports them to a comic book store.

Meanwhile, Claire and Peter flee from Knox and Flint. They get a short reprieve in the sewer, where Peter informs Claire about the person she might become in the future and how he's desperately trying to stop that from happening. When Knox and Flint find them, Peter runs and Claire distracts them. However, Knox reveals that they actually have come for her. Claire's bravery falters when Knox calls her by name, allowing Knox to get stronger by feeding off Claire's fear. They grab her, but Peter, having heard her shouts, returns and tricks Flint into igniting a loose gas pipe, letting him and Claire escape.

Arthur returns to Pinehearst and tells Sylar that his capacity for empathy (exhibited earlier by saving Peter from his fall) shows that he can actually take powers without killing. Arthur then tests this discovery by putting him in a cell with Elle, who is shackled to the floor. When she sees Sylar, she takes out her anger and grief over her father's death, striking him multiple times with her electric discharge. Sylar continues to heal and Elle eventually begs him to kill her, so the pain will stop. Sylar, however, frees her from the shackles and forgives her for hurting him 18 months earlier. He tells her all she needs to do is forgive herself. Elle does and shows visible relief, confirming that she's finally free from her pain and able to control her powers again. In helping Elle, Sylar also gains her power. The attraction between them returns and they're drawn to each other again, while Arthur watches them on a monitor.

Nathan and Tracy confront Arthur, who tries to persuade Nathan to become the leader he was destined to be. Nathan leaves for Primatech to consider his options, but Tracy returns to Arthur. She states that she would be able to persuade Nathan to join Arthur provided she's given some protection.

Matt and Daphne arrive at Primatech where a vision of Usutu leads them to Angela. Matt decides to help her, which prompts Daphne to visit Arthur to inform him of the situation and ask for further instructions. When she returns, Matt decides to enter Angela's mind to help her escape her coma. He enters and finds Angela handcuffed to a chair, with all the doors locked. Suddenly, a door opens and Daphne appears - stabbing Matt. In the real world, Daphne notices that Matt has started to bleed and manages to join him inside Angela's mind. The fake Daphne is revealed to be Arthur, who informs Matt about Daphne's betrayal. Daphne counters that she loves Matt and she doesn't want to fight anymore. Angela plays on Arthur's feelings by reminding him of their love and Angela is freed from the chair. They all go back to the real world and Angela wakes up from her coma.

Peter and Claire arrive at Primatech and Matt attacks Peter - believing him to be the "Future Peter" who sent him to Africa. Peter convinces Matt it wasn't him and they go back to Angela's room. Angela tells them about the formula, and that there's a third piece required: a catalyst which lives in the blood of a human host. Mohinder had also explained this to Arthur earlier, stating that the catalyst cannot be artificially created. Arthur pointed out that Kaito Nakamura must have hidden it, but not well enough - and was seen soon after looking at Claire's file. When Angela finishes explaining, Claire confirms her belief that she is the catalyst, as Sylar saw something different inside her.

At the comic book store, Hiro and Ando discover a new edition of 9th Wonders!. The last page has the same picture of the eclipse that Usutu painted, with the caption "It's coming". The episode ends by contrasting images of both Petrelli parents and their respective groups of supporters - (Team Pinehearst: Arthur, Elle, Sylar, Knox, Flint and Tracy; Team Primatech: Angela, Peter, Nathan, Daphne, Matt and Claire) - while Arthur draws an eclipse using Peter's copy of Isaac's power, saying only that "It's coming".

== Critical reception ==
Steve Heisler of The A.V. Club rated this episode a F.

Robert Canning of IGN gave the episode 7.6 out of 10.
