= Seventh Heaven =

Seventh Heaven or 7th Heaven may refer to:

== Religious and ancient cosmology ==
- The highest of seven heavens according to Islam and Judaism
- One of the celestial spheres in cosmological models widely used until the early 17th century

== Books ==
- Seventh Heaven (poetry collection), a poetry collection by Patti Smith, and the title poem
- Seventh Heaven, a 1990 novel by Alice Hoffman
- 7th Heaven (novel), a novel in the Women's Murder Club Series by James Patterson

== Film, television, and theater ==
- Seventh Heaven (play), a 1922 Broadway play by Austin Strong
- 7th Heaven (1927 film), a silent film with Janet Gaynor
- Seventh Heaven (1937 film), a remake with James Stewart
- Seventh Heaven, a 1955 Broadway musical by Victor Young and Stella Unger
- Seventh Heaven (1956 film), Swedish film
- Seventh Heaven (1958 film), a French-Italian film directed by Raymond Bernard
- 7th Heaven, a 1989 short directed by Shimmy Marcus
- Seventh Heaven (1993 film) (De zevende hemel), a Dutch romantic comedy
- 7th Heaven (TV series), an American family drama TV series
- Seventh Heaven (1997 film) (Le septième ciel), a French film starring Sandrine Kiberlain
- 7th Heaven, a 2004 Norwegian film with music by John Erik Kaada
- Seventh Heaven, a 2008 Egyptian film nominated for Best Picture in the 5th Africa Movie Academy Awards
- Seventh Heaven (2015 film), an Israeli musical animated short film

== Music ==
- 7th Heaven (band), an American rock band
- Seventh Heaven, alias of British music producer Alan James Stott, one half of Neutron and Star

=== Albums ===
- Seventh Heaven (Buck-Tick album), 1988
- Seventh Heaven (Kalafina album), 2009
- Seventh Heaven, by Anthony Phillips and Andrew Skeet
- Seventh Heaven, by Takanori Nishikawa
- Seventh Heaven, an EP by Jesu

=== Songs ===
- "Seventh Heaven" (L'Arc-en-Ciel song), 2007
- "Seventh Heaven", by Beck from Colors, 2017
- "Seventh Heaven", by Deep Purple from Abandon, 1998
- "Seventh Heaven", by Perfume, B-side of "Polyrhythm", 2007
- "7th Heaven" (Vanity song), 1985
- "7th Heaven", by Angelina Jordan, 2021

== Other uses ==
- Seventh Heaven (sports), a sports team winning game seven in a best-of-seven playoff series
- Seventh Heaven (horse), thoroughbred racehorse
- Seventh Heaven, a Ferris wheel in Ufa, Bashkortostan
- Seventh Heaven (restaurant), the revolving restaurant in the Ostankino Tower in Moscow, Russia
- Jing, King of Bandits: Seventh Heaven, an animation in the anime series Jing: King of Bandits
- 7th Heaven (frequent flyer program), the Air Jamaica frequent–flyer program
- 7th Heaven, a bar owned by Tifa Lockhart in the Final Fantasy video-game series

== See also ==
- Seven earths
- Seven minutes in heaven (disambiguation)
- Empyrean
- Hyperuranion
