= Seven Minutes =

Seven Minutes may refer to:

- Seven Minutes (1989 film), a 1989 German film by Klaus Maria Brandauer
- The Seven Minutes, a 1969 novel by Irving Wallace
- The Seven Minutes (film), a 1971 movie by Russ Meyer, based on the novel

== See also ==
- Seven More Minutes
- Seven minutes in heaven teenagers' party game
- Seven minutes in heaven (disambiguation)
- Seven Minutes to Midnight (disambiguation)
- 7 Minutes
