= Tony Haynes (American musician) =

American songwriter

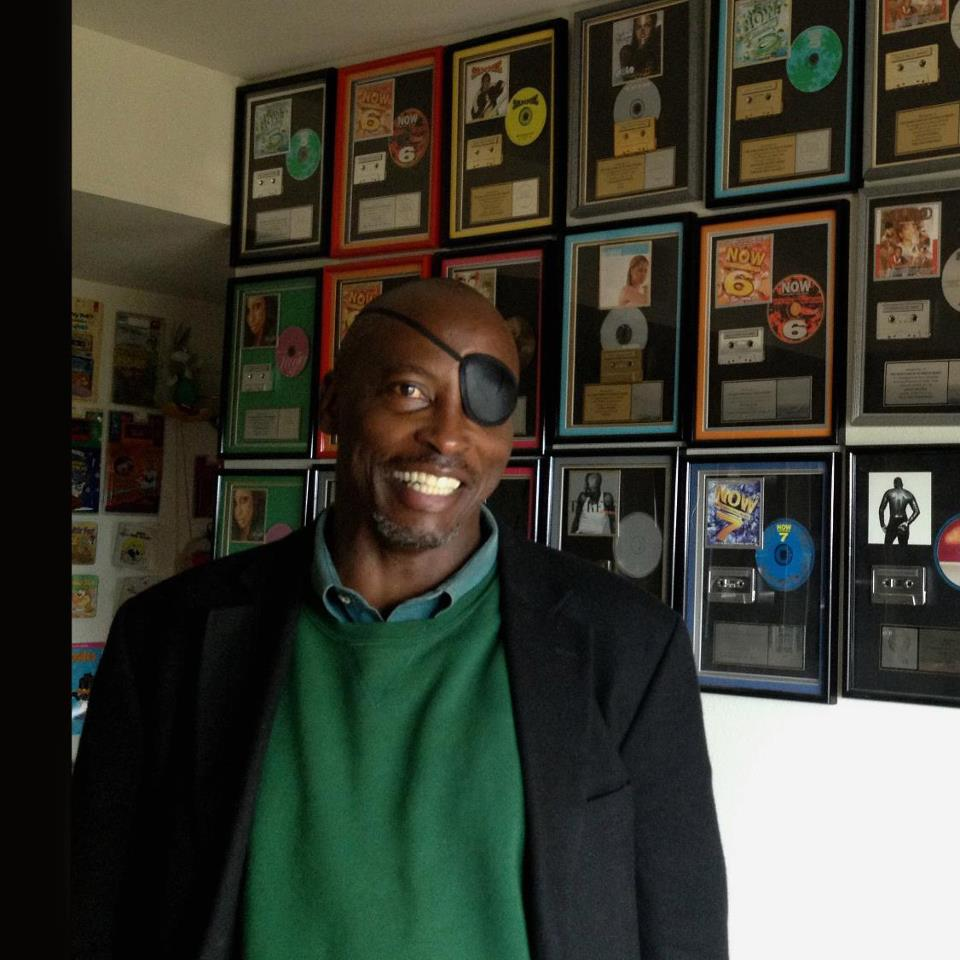
- Tony Haynes

Background information
- Genres: R&B, pop
- Occupations: Record producer, songwriter, publisher, author
- Years active: 1981–present

Tony Haynes is an American lyricist, songwriter, poet, music publisher, producer and author. Over the last four decades he has written lyrics to melodies composed by the biggest names in R&B and pop music. He has also authored children's books and produced children's music based on some of the most successful animated characters.

== Lyricist and songwriter ==
He began his professional career in 1981 writing songs with Al McKay and David Bryant. McKay had recently left Earth, Wind & Fire. He signed Haynes to a co-publishing deal with Steelchest Music and introduced him to David Bryant. Together they wrote "Send A Little Love" for The Spinners, "Sayonara" for A Taste of Honey and "Lovers" and "You Owe It All To Love" for Finis Henderson. With Erich Bulling, Haynes also wrote songs for Japanese recording artists Naoko Kawai and Hiromi Iwasaki. In 1982, he began writing with Maurice White, Wanda Vaughn, Wayne Vaughn, Skip Scarborough, Philip Bailey and Robert Brookins. These collaborations led to "The Speed Of Love" on Haynes' first gold album, Earth, Wind & Fire, Powerlight as well as "Trapped" and "The Good Guy's Supposed To Get The Girls" on Philip Bailey's solo project Continuation and "I Will No Wise Cast You Out" on The Wonders of His Love. His association with Maurice White also led to a collaboration with David Foster on "My Sweet Delight" by Jennifer Holliday from her album Feel My Soul.

In 1984, Haynes began writing lyrics for a wide variety of projects which included the song "Drive Me Wild" for the television series Fame. He also collaborated with Japanese composer Keisuke Kuwata from the band Southern All Stars on Tarako and Japaneggae for Taishita. Through his association with Quincy Jones he collaborated with bassist and former Brothers Johnson member Louis Johnson on eight songs on Johnson's solo album Evolution. During this period Haynes' songs such as "Runnin'" was recorded by The Temptations on their album Truly for You. He also had songs recorded by Jeff Lorber "Don't Say Yes", Beau Williams "Danger Zone", George Duke "We're Supposed To Have Fun", Durell Coleman "Tender Blue", The Mac Band "Miss Used", and Stanley Clarke Band "Psychedelic". In 1985, his song "Hyperactive", written with Robert Palmer and Dennis Nelson, appeared on the album Riptide on Island Records. This was his first multi-platinum album. The song also appeared in the film The Bedroom Window. During the period of 1985 to 1989, Haynes signed co-publishing deals with Warner Chappell Music and Chris Blackwell's Island Music Publishing.

From 1985 to 1989, as a lyricist, Haynes continued to be in demand. He scored a top ten single with "Under the Influence from the album Skin on Skin recorded by Vanity on Motown Records. This song was co-written with Robbie Nevil and Tommy Faragher. He also had songs recorded by Patrice Rushen "All My Love", The Pointer Sisters "Flirtatious", Johnny Kemp "One Thing Led To Another", Tracie Spencer "Lullaby Child", 101 North, "That Feelin'", SOS Band "One Of Many Nights" and Kool & The Gang "Money & Power" and "You've Got My Heart On Fire".

During this period, co-writing with Robert Brookins, their songs were recorded by The Isley Brothers "Come to Me", Stephanie Mills "Automatic Passion" and "Jesse", Carl Anderson and Angela Bofill "A Woman In Love", Al Jarreau "Pleasure", Bobby Brown King of Stage "Seventeen" and Haynes co-wrote "Your Tender Romance" with Paul Jackson, Jr. on Brown's album. Brookins and Haynes continued working together and their songs were also recorded by Sue Ann Carwell, Dale Bozzio, The Reddings, Jackie Jackson and Christopher Williams. Haynes first number-one single, "She's On the Left" came in 1989. It was recorded by Jeffrey Osborne and it appeared on his album One Love, One Dream. It was co-written by Haynes, Spud Blanson, Jeffrey Osborne and Robert Brookins. Haynes’ song, "Make It My Night", co-written by Danny Sembello and recorded by Donna Allen appeared in the motion picture Fatal Beauty and "Be The One", recorded by Jackie Jackson appeared in the 1988 film My Stepmother Is an Alien.

He also began writing with Attala Zane Giles and their songs were recorded by Troop "Still In Love" on their Troop album, "Shadow" by Howard Hewett, "The Love We Share" Will Downing, "Shadow" and "Personally" by George Howard and "He Said/She Said" Debbie Allen. Haynes wrote songs for the NBC television series Guys Next Door. Haynes also had a song "Harder" recorded by Gregory Alan Williams on the Baywatch TV Series soundtrack, as well as a collaboration with Rika Muranaka "I Am The Wind" on the Sony PlayStation game, Castlevania: Symphony of the Night.

In 1990 Haynes, partnered Laney Stewart. Their songs were recorded by Evelyn Champagne King, Karyn White, Ritual of Love and Chante Moore. "Candlelight and You" and "Who Do I Turn To", Nicki Richards, Altitude, Regina Belle, Louis Price, Charlie Wilson, Sue Ann Carwell, Tichina Arnold, IV Xample, Ebony Vibe Everlasting and Go West. Stewart and Haynes began working with Jimmy Jam & Terry Lewis and during this period Haynes signed a co-publishing deal with Polygram Music Publishing which later became Universal Music Publishing. Stewart and Haynes influences were Louil Silas, Jr., Benny Medina and Quincy Jones. Stewart and Haynes also experienced great success with "Never Let Them See You Sweat" by Go West (band), which was featured in White Men Can't Jump and "Candlelight and You," recorded by Keith Washington and Chanté Moore, which was featured in House Party. Through Louil Silas, Jr., Haynes met Teddy Riley and co-wrote "Get Away". It was recorded by Bobby Brown on his album Bobby. It was also a #1 dance song.

From 1993 to 2016, Haynes also wrote songs recorded by Sounds of Blackness, Jade "Hold Me Close" with Vassal Benford, Jeremy Jordan "Girl You Got It Going On" with Rhett Lawrence and "Wanna Girl" with Keith Thomas, Peabo Bryson "Love Will Take Care Of You" with Keith Thomas, as well as songs recorded by Barry Lather, Immature IMx, For Lovers Only, Jesse Campbell "A Woman in Love" from Angela Bofill I Try, Anthology, Keith Sweat from his album "Dress to Impress" and Kuh Ledesma from her album Precious. Collaborating with Preston Glass, Haynes wrote songs for Brenda Holloway, and Evelyn Champagne King, and Karyn White. Tony Haynes is the writer and co-producer of "The (Unauthorized) I Hate Barney Songbook" (1994), performed by Freda Payne.
