= 7th Heaven (Vanity song) =

Single by Vanity

from the album The Last Dragon: Original Soundtrack Album
- Released: April 1985
- Recorded: 1984
- Genre: Dance-pop; R&B
- Length: 3:28
- Label: Motown
- Songwriter(s): Vanity, Bill Wolfer
- Producer(s): Bill Wolfer

Vanity singles chronology
"Mechanical Emotion" (1985)	"7th Heaven" (1985)	"Under the Influence" (1986)

"7th Heaven" is a song by Canadian singer and actress Vanity. The track was released as a promotional single to support the 1985 soundtrack to the film, The Last Dragon, starring Vanity, Taimak, and Julius J. Carry III.

The song was co-written and produced by Bill Wolfer and released as a single. To help promote the soundtrack album release, Vanity appeared on various talk shows including The Merv Griffin Show, in which she discussed the film and also performed the song. For her appearance, Vanity wore the "7th Heaven" blue and silver dress she had worn in the film.

== Music video ==
The music video theme shows Vanity as her film character Laura Charles, who is a singer and video DJ at the popular 7th Heaven club. She makes her entrance performing "7th Heaven", as an elevator lowers her below to the dance floor in the night club. A large video screen is shown behind her, as it shows her performing the song in the night club.

== Credits ==
- Produced by Bill Wolfer
- Written by Bill Wolfer and Vanity
