= The Last Dragon (soundtrack) =

The Last Dragon: Original Soundtrack Album

Soundtrack album by Various Artists
- Released: April 1, 1985
- Recorded: 1984–85
- Studios: Motown/Hitsville USA Recording Studios (Hollywood, California)
- Genres: Soul, R&B, Pop, funk
- Length: 37:57
- Label: Motown Records
- Producer: Various Artists

Singles from The Last Dragon: Original Soundtrack Album
- 1. "Rhythm of the Night" Released: February 1985; 2. "7th Heaven" Released: April 1985

The Last Dragon: Original Soundtrack Album is a soundtrack album for the 1985 movie The Last Dragon starring Taimak, Julius Carry, Vanity and Christopher Murney. The music soundtrack album was supervised by executive producer Berry Gordy, the founder of Motown Records.

The soundtrack features the DeBarge’s hit song, "Rhythm of the Night", written by Diane Warren. The song reached top five on the Billboard Hot 100 and #1 on the Billboard R&B Singles chart. Also included is new music by singers Stevie Wonder, Smokey Robinson, and the film's star, Vanity; as well as various artists from the Motown label. The soundtrack also features songwriting from Norman Whitfield, who had left Motown in 1975 and set up his own record company Whitfield Records, and returned to Motown in the early 1980s.

== Track listing ==
US Vinyl LP Album

No.	Title	Writer(s)	Performer(s)	Length
1.	"The Last Dragon (Title song from Berry Gordy's The Last Dragon)"	Bruce Miller; Norman Whitfield	Dwight David	5:21
2.	"7th Heaven"	Vanity; Bill Wolfer	Vanity	3:28
3.	"Star"	Greg Crockett; Sharon Barnes; Gwen Gordy Fuqua	Alfie	4:04
4.	"Fire"	Charlene; Brian Wild; Nigel Wright	Charlene	3:10
5.	"The Glow"	Willie Hutch	Hutch	3:22
6.	"Rhythm of the Night"	Diane Warren	DeBarge	3:47
7.	"Upset Stomach"	Stevie Wonder	Wonder	4:39
8.	"First Time on A Ferris Wheel"	Harriet Schock; Misha Segal	Smokey Robinson & Syreeta	3:25
9.	"Peeping Tom"	Janet Cole; Antoine Green; Rockwell	Rockwell	3:58
10.	"Inside You"	Hutch	Hutch featuring The Temptations	4:32

== Charts ==
=== Singles ===
Year	Single	Peak chart positions													
Year	Single	US Hot 100	US R&B	US AC	CAN	AUS	FRA	GER	IRL	NED	NZ	SWE	SWI	UK	Belgium
1985	"Rhythm of the Night" (performed by DeBarge)	3	1	1	3	18	50	19	5	4	3	24	4	4	7

== Credits ==
- Executive Producer: Berry Gordy
- Mastered by John Matousek

Mastered at Motown / Hitsville USA Recording Studios, Hollywood, California
Digitally remastered by Suha Gur at Universal Mastering Studios-East. Researched and supervised by Harry Weinger.
