= Night School (1981 film) =

1981 American slasher film by Ken Hughes

- Original U.S. theatrical poster
- Directed by: Ken Hughes
- Written by: Ruth Avergon
- Produced by: Ruth Avergon; Larry Babb
- Starring: Leonard Mann; Rachel Ward; Drew Snyder; Joseph R. Sicari
- Cinematography: Mark Irwin
- Edited by: Robert Reitano
- Music by: Brad Fiedel
- Production companies: Lorimar; Resource Productions
- Distributed by: Paramount Pictures
- Release dates: January 1981 (Avoriaz); September 11, 1981 (US)
- Running time: 88 minutes
- Country: United States
- Language: English
- Budget: $1.2 million
- Box office: $1.6 million

Night School (also released as Terror Eyes) is a 1981 American slasher film directed by Ken Hughes and starring Rachel Ward, Leonard Mann, and Drew Snyder. The plot follows a series of brutal decapitation murders occurring around a women's night college in Boston, Massachusetts. It marked the debut feature film of Ward, and the final film directed by Hughes. The music score was composed by Brad Fiedel.

Filmed on location in Boston's Beacon Hill neighborhood, Night School premiered in January 1981 at the Avoriaz International Fantastic Film Festival in France, where director Hughes won the Terror Award and was nominated for the jury Grand Prize. It was theatrically released in France on May 13, 1981, and in the United Kingdom on July 3, 1981, under its working title, Terror Eyes. The film subsequently premiered in the United States on September 11, 1981, distributed by Paramount Pictures.

Night School received mixed reviews from critics, with some praising Hughes's direction, while others criticized its screenplay and violence. In the United Kingdom, the film was included on the British Board of Film Classification's list of "video nasties" and was banned from home video release until 1985, when it was released with over a minute of footage excised.

== Plot ==
Outside of a Boston daycare center, teacher's aid Anne Barron is brutally decapitated by a kukri-armed assailant wearing a black motorcycle helmet. Lt. Judd Austin is the policeman assigned to the case. As he gets to the scene, he sees the girl decapitated with her head in a nearby bucket. The distraught director of the center tells Judd that Anne worked there during the day and was attending night classes at Wendell College.

At the hospital, Judd and his partner, Taj, discuss a similar case from the previous week, in which another girl was decapitated with her head found in a pond. They wonder if there is any connection between the two murders. At Wendell, the administrator Helene Griffin tells Judd that Anne was close to a girl named Kim Morrison. When asked whether Anne had a boyfriend, Kim tells Judd that Anne was involved with someone but does not know who. Judd enters Professor Millett's anthropology class to speak with him about Anne. The professor provides little information but introduces Judd to a British exchange student named Eleanor Adjai. Eleanor leaves the school and goes to the local diner. There, she is creeped out by Gary, the busboy, who appears to have mental issues. The waitress, Carol, asks Eleanor if she is in Millett's class and implies that he sleeps around, which irritates Eleanor, who leaves. Gary follows her home. When she realizes this, she runs the rest of the way and quickly locks her door. Eleanor gets into the shower, but someone tries to break in. Frightened, she gets out of the shower, only to find that it is Professor Millett, her boyfriend, who was locked out by accident.

Kim Morrison, a Wendell student working at the local aquarium, is decapitated while preparing to leave her shift by the same figure in the motorcycle helmet. A woman watching turtles in the aquarium screams upon seeing Kim's head sink into the tank. Judd visits Professor Millett and is surprised to see Eleanor, who explains that she is his research assistant. Judd then informs Millett that a second student of his has been killed and asks him if he has had any affairs with his pupils. Annoyed by the question, Millett tells Judd to leave. Eleanor and Millett get into an argument, and she goes to the diner to be alone. The professor follows her, and she tells him that she is three months pregnant. He is sympathetic, though he still flirts with Carol. After the diner has closed, Carol is left to clean up. When the power goes out, she heads to the basement to investigate. The killer appears and attacks her. Carol escapes but is then caught in an alley and killed. The next day, Carol's head is found in a water-filled sink, and her body in a dumpster. Judd and Taj go to Gary's house since he is now considered a prime suspect, but Judd does not believe he was involved.

When Judd returns to Professor Millett's home, he finds a collection of skulls taken from tribal headhunters worldwide. Eleanor sees nothing wrong with this. At Wendell, Helene tells Millett to stop sleeping around with his students and counsels student Kathy, who confesses that she, too, has been intimate with Millett. Helene, taking advantage of Kathy's vulnerability, invites her to spend the night at her house, leading to the two sleeping together. Helene is killed when she gets up to answer the phone, and Kathy is killed shortly after discovering Helene's severed head in the toilet.

Judd is on his way to speak to Helene when he sees the killer fleeing. He chases the killer to Professor Millett's apartment. Inside, the killer is revealed to be Eleanor. She confesses the killings to her boyfriend and justifies the crimes by comparing them to tribal rituals he teaches in his courses. As the police approach, Millett puts on the helmet and flees on his motorcycle to divert suspicion from Eleanor. During a chase with Judd and Taj, Millett is struck by a car and killed. Eleanor attends his burial, and the police believe the case has been solved, although it is implied that Judd suspects Eleanor was the killer and Millett sacrificed his life to protect her. However, the case is closed, and Eleanor returns to England. Afterward, Judd gets in his car and is suddenly attacked by the killer, only to reveal it was a prank by Taj.

== Cast ==
- Rachel Ward as Eleanor Adjai
- Leonard Mann as Lt. Judd Austin
- Drew Snyder as Vincent Millett
- Joseph R. Sicari as Taj
- Nicholas Cairis as Gus
- Karen MacDonald as Carol Mann
- Annette Miller as Helene Griffin
- Bill McCann as Gary
- Margo Skinner as Stevie Cabot
- Kevin Fennessy as Harry
- Elizabeth Barnitz as Kim Morrison
- Holly Hardman as Kathy
- Meb Boden as Anne Barron
- Leonard Corman as Priest
- Belle McDonald as Marjorie Armand
- Ed Higgins as Coroner

== Production ==
=== Development ===
The screenplay for Night School was written by Ruth Avergon, who also served as producer. Alfred Sole was originally attached to direct the film, with Vanity in the lead role. Both departed the project due to disagreements with Avergon, and veteran director Ken Hughes was brought on board at short notice, who rewrote the script to add more humor and character development.

Newcomer Rachel Ward was cast in the film after Avergon spotted her at a New York City casting call for the film. At the time, Ward was a top fashion model but had never acted in a film before, Night School was her film debut. Likewise, it was Leonard Mann's American film debut, though he was already a seasoned leading man in Italian Spaghetti Westerns and giallo films.

=== Filming ===
Night School was shot on location in Boston, Massachusetts, largely in the Beacon Hill neighborhood as well as Back Bay, in the spring of 1980 on a budget of $1.2 million. It was the second feature film to be near-exclusively shot in Boston, after The Brink's Job. The final sequence however, tacked on after principal photography, was filmed in New York City. Shooting locations in Boston included at the New England Aquarium and Quincy Market.

Reflecting on the film's visual appearance, Avergon said:

We wanted a certain look for it. We had a wonderful setting; Beacon Hill is just incredible. We had done a lot of location scouting beforehand so we knew the look we wanted for the film. And we wanted to juxtapose this gorgeous, elegant Old World look with this horrible thing that was going on. That was very much part of the design of the film. I think the combination of Ken and Mark Irwin [cinematographer] being extremely fast and good enabled us to get what we wanted.

Avergon recalled of working with director Ken Hughes: "Ken had enormous energy ... I just loved working with him. He was a joy to work with. He really knew what he was doing. There wasn't a lot of second guessing. He knew what shots had to be taken for our budget. The production value that he gave us, along with Mark Irwin [cinematographer], was wonderful. I thought they really captured a nice look for the film".

== Release ==
Night School premiered in January 1981 in France at the Avoriaz International Fantastic Film Festival under its working title Terror Eyes (French: Les yeux de la terreur) before receiving a theatrical release in the country on May 13, 1981. It was released in the United Kingdom as Terror Eyes on July 3, 1981. It later premiered as Night School in its native United States on September 11, 1981.

In the United Kingdom, the film was listed under the British Board of Film Classification's "Dropped 33" segment of video nasties. It remained banned on home video in the United Kingdom until June 1985, when it was released on VHS with over a minute of footage cut.

=== Title variation ===
While the film's working title was Terror Eyes, its official domestic title is Night School. However, it retained the working title of Terror Eyes for its release in some European markets, including France and the United Kingdom. The film was released in Spain under the title Psicosis 2, in an attempt to mislead the public into assuming this was a sequel to Psycho two years before the actual sequel came out. This was part of a similar trend in Spain and Italy; other examples are films deceptively titled Alien 2, Tiburón 3 (literally Jaws 3) or La Casa 3, standing for a third sequel to The Evil Dead.

=== Home media ===
Night School was released on VHS in October 1985 by CBS/Fox Video under its Key Video sub-label. Warner Bros. Home Entertainment reissued the film on VHS in 1993.

The film was released on DVD-R through the Warner Archive Collection on November 2, 2011. On October 24, 2017, Warner Archive released the film for the first time on Blu-ray featuring a remastered transfer. Vinegar Syndrome (under license from Warner Bros. Home Entertainment) will release Night School on 4K Ultra HD on August 25, 2026.

== Reception ==
=== Box office ===
Night School was a box-office disappointment for Paramount Pictures, grossing only $1.6 million against a budget of $1.2 million.

=== Critical response ===
Vincent Canby of The New York Times dismissed the film as "a not very scary story" in a short review. Variety called it "a low budget exercise in terror offering very little diversion or novelty for fans of the already gutted 'psychotic slasher' genre". Richard Harrington of The Washington Post wrote that the film "aspires to something more, but ends up falling back on a half-dozen killings and the grizzly uncovering of the victims' heads. If the script is a little faulty and obvious, Mark Irwin's cinematography almost makes up for it. Irwin works with a subtle palette and his 1981 Boston is suffused with the vivid dampness and ember glow of Jack the Ripper's London (without the fog)".

Ed Blank of The Pittsburgh Press gave the film a middling review, noting that Hughes "manages to inject low levels of suspense, but there's still not a lot to recommend. Night School isn't worth the time of anyone who ordinarily doesn't see such movies. It is, though, more of a cut than a sliver above most others." Carol Newell of The Potomac News conceded that "Hughes has directed [the film] with some creative effort, encasing the story in mellow tones that would seem better suited in a period piece." Robert Brown of The Monthly Film Bulletin declared: "Basic shortcomings in writing, performances and direction, combined with the unnerving relish with which the film carves up its hapless female victims, allow little scope for either genuine horror or a parody of the same".

George Anderson of the Pittsburgh Post-Gazette called the film "one of the tamest ...horror flicks to date," while Ted Mastroianni of the Cleveland Press panned the film "gory and idiotic," concluding: "Night School is badly written, confusingly directed and poorly acted. And as a mystery story, it cheats in its conclusion, not once but several times." Dick Fleming of The Daily Times found the film's plot twist predicable, and found it "devoid of any real suspense."

Retrospective assessment has noted the film's mixture of slasher films with Italian gialli and police procedurals. Film scholar Adam Rockoff deemed the film "grim" and one of the "slickest-looking slasher" films of its era.

=== Accolades ===
Award/association	Year	Category	Nominee(s)	Result	Ref.
Avoriaz International Fantastic Film Festival	1981	Terror Award	Ken Hughes	Won	
Avoriaz International Fantastic Film Festival	1981	Grand Prize	Ken Hughes	Nominated	

== Sources ==
- Kerekes, David; Slater, David (2005). See No Evil: Banned Films and Video Controversy. London, England: Headpress. ISBN 978-1-900-48610-1.
- Normanton, Peter (2012). The Mammoth Book of Slasher Movies. London, England: Robinson. ISBN 978-0-762-44596-7.
- Petridis, Sotiris (2019). Anatomy of the Slasher Film A Theoretical Analysis. Jefferson, North Carolina: McFarland & Company. ISBN 978-1-476-63567-5.
- Rockoff, Adam (2002). Going to Pieces: The Rise and Fall of the Slasher Film. Jefferson, North Carolina: McFarland & Company. ISBN 978-0-786-41227-3.
- Sipos, Thomas S. (2010). Horror Film Aesthetics: Creating the Visual Language of Fear. Jefferson, North Carolina: McFarland & Company. ISBN 978-0-786-45834-9.
