= Skin on Skin =

Skin on Skin may refer to:

== Albums ==
- Skin on Skin (Vanity album), 1986

== Songs ==
- "Skin on Skin" (Sarah Connor song), 2002
- "Skin on Skin", a song by the Boomtown Rats from V Deep, 1982
- "Skin on Skin", a song by Cedric Gervais, 2016
- "Skin on Skin", a song by Grace, 1996
- "Skin on Skin", a song by Talisman from Cats and Dogs, 2003
- "Skin on Skin", a song by Queens of the Stone Age from Lullabies to Paralyze, 2005.
