= Postman's Knock =

Postman's Knock is a children's kissing game.

It may also refer to Postman's Knock (film), a 1962 British comedy film directed by Robert Lynn and starring Spike Milligan.
