= Mark Irwin =

Canadian cinematographer (born 1950)

Mark Irwin C.S.C A.S.C.
- Born: August 7, 1950 (age 76); Toronto, Ontario, Canada
- Years active: 1974–2023
- Children: 1
- Website: markirwincscasc.com

Mark Irwin C.S.C., A.S.C. (born August 7, 1950) is a Canadian cinematographer.

== Career ==
Irwin is known primarily in the genres of horror and comedy, most notably with his collaborations with David Cronenberg and The Farrelly Brothers.

== Filmography ==
=== Film ===
Year	Title	Director
1976	Point of No Return	Ed Hunt
1977	Starship Invasions	Ed Hunt
1978	Blood and Guts	Paul Lynch
1979	Plague	Ed Hunt
1979	Fast Company	David Cronenberg
1979	The Brood	David Cronenberg
1980	Cries in the Night	William Fruet
1980	Tanya's Island	Alfred Sole
1981	Scanners	David Cronenberg
1981	Night School	Ken Hughes
1982	Trapped	William Fruet
1983	Videodrome	David Cronenberg
1983	The Dead Zone	David Cronenberg
1983	Spasms	William Fruet
1985	The Protector	James Glickenhaus
1986	Youngblood	Peter Markle
1986	The Fly	David Cronenberg
1987	The Hanoi Hilton	Lionel Chetwynd
1987	Buckeye and Blue	Juleen Compton
1987	Love at Stake	John Moffitt
1988	Pass the Ammo	David Beaird
1988	The Blob	Chuck Russell
1988	Bat*21	Peter Markle
1988	Fright Night Part 2	Tommy Lee Wallace
1989	Paint It Black	Tim Hunter
1990	I Come in Peace	Craig R. Baxley
1990	Class of 1999	Mark L. Lester
1990	RoboCop 2	Irvin Kershner
1991	Showdown in Little Tokyo	Mark L. Lester
1992	Passenger 57	Kevin Hooks
1993	Extreme Justice	Mark L. Lester
1993	Slaughter of the Innocents	James Glickenhaus
1993	Man's Best Friend	John Lafia
1994	D2: The Mighty Ducks	Sam Weisman
1994	April One	Murray Battle
1994	Wes Craven's New Nightmare	Wes Craven
1994	Dumb and Dumber	Peter Farrelly
1995	Night of the Running Man	Mark L. Lester
1995	Vampire in Brooklyn	Wes Craven
1996	Kingpin	The Farrelly Brothers
1996	Scream	Wes Craven
1997	Steel	Kenneth Johnson
1998	Misbegotten	Mark L. Lester
1998	There's Something About Mary	The Farrelly Brothers
1998	Zack and Reba	Nicole Bettauer
1999	10 Things I Hate About You	Gil Junger
2000	Road Trip	Todd Phillips
2000	Me, Myself & Irene	The Farrelly Brothers
2001	Say It Isn't So	J. B. Rogers
2001	Freddy Got Fingered	Tom Green
2001	American Pie 2	J. B. Rogers
2001	Osmosis Jones (Note: Live-action scenes)	The Farrelly Brothers
2003	Old School	Todd Philips
2003	Malibu's Most Wanted	John Whitesell
2003	Scary Movie 3	David Zucker
2005	The Ringer	Barry W. Blaustein
2006	Grandma's Boy	Nicholaus Goossen
2006	Big Momma's House 2	John Whitesell
2006	Deck the Halls	John Whitesell
2007	Sydney White	Joe Nussbaum
2007	Blonde Ambition	Scott Marshall
2009	Dance Flick	Damien Dante Wayans
2009	All's Faire in Love	Scott Marshall
2009	The Shortcut	Nicholaus Goossen
2010	The Last Godfather	Shim Hyung-rae
2013	Concrete Blondes	Nicholas Kalikow
2017	The Layover	William H. Macy
2019	American Hangman	Wilson Coneybeare
2019	Junglee	Chuck Russell
2023	The Retirement Plan	Tim Brown

=== Television ===
Year	Title	Director	Notes
1985–86	The Ray Bradbury Theater	William Fruet; Douglas Jackson; Bruce Pittman; Don McBrearty	4 episodes
1990	Tales from the Crypt	Peter S. Seaman	Episode "My Brother's Keeper"
1992	Nightmare Cafe	Phillip Noyce	Episode "Pilot"
2014	Black Jesus	Mike Clattenburg	Season 1
2019	Pup Academy	Anna McRoberts	Episode "The Stray's First Day"
2020	Russell Maniac	Robert Vince	All 7 episodes
2021	Scaredy Cats	Anna McRoberts; Robert Vince	8 episodes
2022	Super PupZ	Robert Vince; Tyler Vince	All 10 episodes
2022	Phantom Pups	Anna McRoberts; Robert Vince	All 10 episodes

Television films

Year	Title	Director	Notes
1986	Really Weird Tales	Paul Lynch; Don McBrearty; John Blanchard	
1987	A Child's Christmas in Wales	Don McBrearty	Canada unit
1988	My First Love	Gilbert Cates	With Tom Houghton
1989	Do You Know the Muffin Man?	Gilbert Cates	
1990	Heat Wave	Kevin Hooks	
1990	Call Me Anna	Gilbert Cates	
1991	Not of This World	Jon Hess	
1991	Absolute Strangers	Gilbert Cates	
1991	Backfield in Motion	Richard Michaels	
1991	Dead and Alive: The Race for Gus Farace	Peter Markle	
1992	Keep the Change	Andy Tennant	
1992	Just Deserts	Dan Lerner	
1993	Miracle Child	Michael Pressman	
1995	The Avenging Angel	Craig R. Baxley	
1996	Innocent Victims	Gilbert Cates	
1996	Robin of Locksley	Michael Kennedy	
1996	Don't Look Back	Geoff Murphy	
1997	Tidal Wave: No Escape	George T. Miller	
1997	Joe Torre: Curveballs Along the Way	Sturla Gunnarsson	
1999	Can of Worms	Paul Schneider	
2006	Flight 93	Peter Markle	
2009	Ace Ventura Jr.: Pet Detective	David Mickey Evans	
2011	My Future Boyfriend	Michael Lange	
2011	Carnal Innocence	Peter Markle	
2011	Silent Witness	Peter Markle	
2013	Teen Beach Movie	Jeffrey Hornaday	
2013	The Christmas Spirit	Jack Angelo	
2015	Teen Beach 2	Jeffrey Hornaday	
2017	Descendants 2	Kenny Ortega	
2018	No Sleep 'Til Christmas	Phil Traill	

Documentary appearance

- Scream: The Inside Story (2011)

== Awards and nominations ==
Year	Award	Category	Title	Result	Ref.
1987	CableACE Award	Direction of Photography and/or Lighting; Direction for a Comedy or Dramatic Series	The Ray Bradbury Theater ("Banshee")	Nominated	
1978	Canadian Film Awards	Best Cinematography	Blood and Guts	Nominated	
1984	Canadian Society of Cinematographers	Best Cinematography in a Theatrical Feature	Videodrome	Won	
1985	Canadian Society of Cinematographers	Best Cinematography in a Theatrical Feature	The Dead Zone	Won	
1986	Canadian Society of Cinematographers	Best Cinematography in a Theatrical Feature	Youngblood	Won	
1987	Canadian Society of Cinematographers	Best Cinematography in a Theatrical Feature	The Fly	Won	
1984	Genie Awards	Best Cinematography	Videodrome	Nominated	
2022	Leo Awards	Best Cinematography in a Youth or Children's Program or Series	Scaredy Cats ("Amulet")	Nominated	
2022	Leo Awards	Best Cinematography in a Youth or Children's Program or Series	Super PupZ ("Saving Zeta")	Nominated	
