= Neutron Star (disambiguation) =

A neutron star is the extremely dense collapsed core of a supergiant star.

Neutron Star may also refer to

- "Neutron Star" (short story), 1966 story by Larry Niven
- Neutron Star (short story collection), 1968 anthology of Larry Niven stories
- Neutron and Star, British electronic musicians
