= Undress Me =

"Undress"

Single by Vanity

from the album Action Jackson: Soundtrack Album
- B-side: "Protect and Serve"
- Released: April 1988
- Recorded: 1987
- Genre: Contemporary R&B; Dance-pop
- Length: 4:10
- Label: Atlantic Records
- Songwriter(s): Kim Cage, Vanity, Teresa Laws
- Producer(s): Jesse Johnson

Vanity singles chronology
"Animals" (1986)	"Undress" (1988)

"Undress Me" (also known as "Undress") is a 1988 song by the American R&B/pop singer and actress Vanity, released as a promotional single to support her then up-coming album which was never released. The track is from the 1988 movie soundtrack, Action Jackson which stars Vanity with Carl Weathers and Craig T. Nelson. "Undress" was produced and arranged by the former The Time member and musician Jesse Johnson.

In the film Action Jackson, Vanity portrays Sydney Ashe, a night club singer who is funny, witty and sexy. "Undress" is performed as her character, as is another track also produced by Johnson, a ballad titled "Faraway Eyes".

The song is also used in an episode of Friday the 13th: the Series entitled "The Secret Agenda of Mesmer's Bauble", in which Vanity plays a popular singer called Angelica.

== Track listing ==
US 12" vinyl single

A side

1. Vanity
  - "Undress" (Extended Version) - 6:08 (written by Kim Cage, Jerrie Hubbard, Teresa Laws, Vanity)

B side

1. M.C. Jam & Pee Wee Jam
  - "Protect and Serve" - 5:05 (written by M.C. Jam, Pee Pee Jam, Stevie Silas; produced by Stevie Silas)

== Credits ==
A-side:
Produced for J.W.J. Productions, Inc.
Published by Crazy People Music, ASCAP.

B-side:
Produced for Powertrax
Published by Lorimar Music Bee Corp., BMI.
