= Leo O'Brien (actor) =

American actor (1970–2012)

- Born: November 12, 1970
- Died: October 10, 2012 (aged 41); New York City, U.S.
- Occupations: Actor, writer
- Years active: 1983–1993

Leo O'Brien (November 12, 1970 – October 10, 2012) was an American television and film actor, best known as Richie Green in the 1985 film The Last Dragon.

== Death ==
Leo O'Brien died in New York City on October 10, 2012, at the age of 41. The cause of death was not publicly disclosed. His The Last Dragon co-star Taimak said that family members said O'Brien had been in failing health in the period before his death. An autopsy was scheduled following his death, but contemporary reports did not establish an official cause of death.

== Filmography ==
=== Film ===
Year	Title	Role	Notes
1985	The Last Dragon	Ritchie Green	
1985	Rappin'	Allan	Featured on Soundtrack, writer of "Colors"
1991	New Jack City	Kid on Stoop	

=== Television ===
Year	Title	Role	Notes
1983	Chiefs	(Young) Joshua Cole	Miniseries – Episode: Part 1
1983	CBS Children's Mystery Theatre	Jake	Episode: Dirkham Detective Agency
1984	The Streets	-	Television movie
1990–1991	Law and Order	Tremaine Lewis / Red	2 Episodes
1993	Dark Justice	Christopher	Episode: 2nd Story
