= Steven Levenson =

American playwright and screenwriter

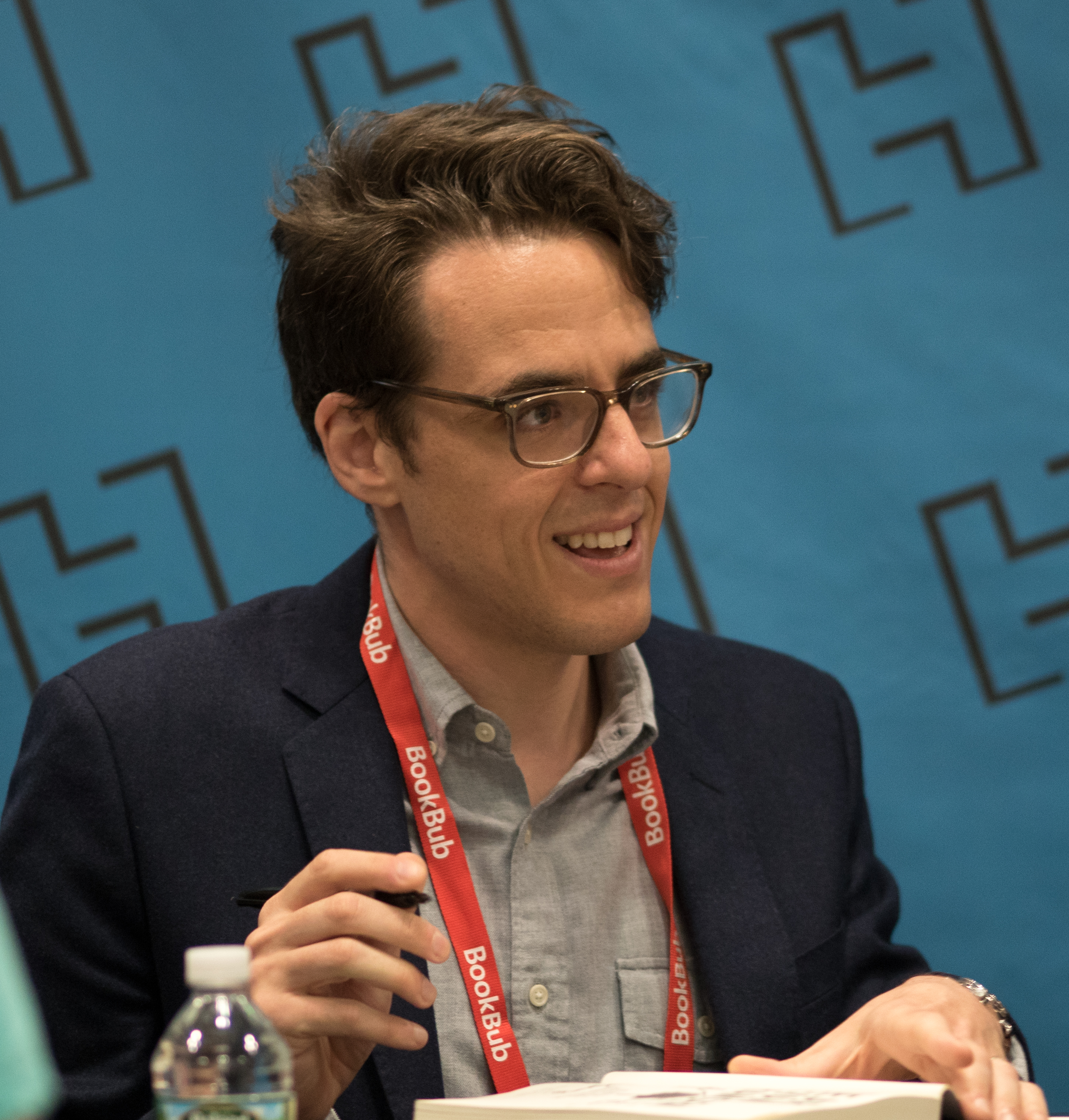
- Levenson at BookExpo America in 2018
- Born: May 1984 (age 42)
- Education: Brown University
- Occupation: Playwright • screenwriter
- Spouse: Whitney May
- Children: 2
- Writing career
- Notable work: Dear Evan Hansen
- Notable awards: Tony Award for Best Book of a Musical

Steven Levenson (born May 1984) is an American playwright and screenwriter. He won the 2017 Tony Award for Best Book of a Musical for Dear Evan Hansen.

== Early life ==
Levenson was raised in Bethesda, Maryland. He was raised in a Reform Jewish family. He attended St. Andrew's Episcopal School and Brown University. He originally studied theater and English but then turned to playwriting. In discussing his interests in writing, he said: "...it does seem that a lot of my work tends to move in that [family] direction. I do find the dynamics in the family to be fascinating and endlessly variable. Family is, obviously, among the most universal experiences." Although he writes for television as well as the stage, he said: "Theater will always be my first love."

== Career ==
=== Stage ===
Levenson wrote the book for the musical Dear Evan Hansen which opened on Broadway in December 2016, after premiering at the Arena Stage in Washington, DC in 2015.

His stage playwriting credits include The Language of Trees (2008, Roundabout Theatre Company Black Box Theatre) and Seven Minutes in Heaven (2009).

The Unavoidable Disappearance of Tom Durnin was produced Off-Broadway by the Roundabout Theatre Company at the Laura Pels Theatre, opening in June 2013. The play was produced under the Roundabout Theatre's New Play Initiative.

His play If I Forget opened Off-Broadway at the Laura Pels Theatre on February 22, 2017 and closed on April 30, 2017. Directed by Daniel Sullivan the cast featured Jeremy Shamos, Kate Walsh and Maria Dizzia.

His play Days of Rage opened at the Off-Broadway Second Stage Theater's Tony Kiser Theatre on October 2, 2018 with direction by Trip Cullman. The play concerns activists in the late 1960s. Days of Rage was earlier presented at the Hartford Stage Brand New Play Festival in a reading in November 2011, directed by Darko Tresnjak.

=== Television ===
He was a writer for the Showtime series Masters of Sex, which ran for four seasons, from 2013 to 2016.

He served as showrunner for the FX biographical miniseries Fosse/Verdon about the lives of director-choreographer Bob Fosse and actor-singer Gwen Verdon. The series premiered in 2019.

== Filmography ==
Year	Title	Directed by	Notes
2021	tick, tick... BOOM!	Lin Manuel Miranda	Released to Netflix & select theaters, also executive producer
2021	Dear Evan Hansen	Stephen Chbosky	Based on his and Pasek & Paul's musical, also executive producer
2028	Untitled Fred Astaire Biopic	Paul King	Co-written with King, based on the book The Astaires: Fred & Adele
TBA	Untitled Labubu Film	Paul King	Co-written with King
TBA	Fiddler on the Roof	Thomas Kail	Remake of the 1971 film adaptation of the musical

== Personal life ==
Levenson is married to Whitney May, who has worked in art history and design history. They have a daughter, born in 2015.

== Awards and nominations ==
Year	Work	Award	Category	Result	Ref.
2014	The Unavoidable Disappearance of Tom Durnin	Outer Critics Circle Awards	John Gassner Award	Won	
2016	Dear Evan Hansen	Obie Awards	Musical Theatre	Won	
2016	Dear Evan Hansen	Outer Critics Circle Awards	Outstanding Book of a Musical (Broadway or Off-Broadway)	Won	
2017	Dear Evan Hansen	Tony Awards	Best Book of a Musical	Won	
2017	If I Forget	Drama Desk Awards	Outstanding Play	Nominated	
2017	If I Forget	Drama League Awards	Outstanding Production of a Play	Nominated	
2017	If I Forget	Outer Critics Circle Awards	Outstanding New Off-Broadway Play	Won	
2019	Fosse/Verdon	Primetime Emmy Awards	Outstanding Limited Series	Nominated	
2019	Fosse/Verdon	Primetime Emmy Awards	Outstanding Writing for a Limited Series, Movie or Dramatic Special	Nominated	
2021	tick, tick ... BOOM!	HCA Film Awards	Best Adapted Screenplay	Nominated	
2021	tick, tick ... BOOM!	Writers Guild of America Awards	Best Adapted Screenplay	Nominated	
