= Tanya's Island =

1980 film by Alfred Sole

- Film poster
- Directed by: Alfred Sole
- Written by: Pierre Brousseau
- Produced by: Pierre Brousseau
- Starring: Vanity; Richard Sargent
- Cinematography: Mark Irwin
- Edited by: Andrew Henderson; Michael MacLaverty
- Music by: Jean Musy
- Production companies: Canadian Film Development Corporation; Fred Baker Films
- Distributed by: Fred Baker Films; International Film Exchange
- Release date: December 5, 1980
- Countries: United States; Canada
- Language: English
- Budget: $1 million

Tanya's Island is a 1980 Canadian-American fantasy film directed by Alfred Sole. It stars Denise "Vanity" Matthews (credited as “D.D. Winters”) as a young woman caught up in a love triangle with her aggressive boyfriend and a wild ape-man on an imaginary tropical island. The ape suit was created by Rick Baker and Rob Bottin, with special effects contributions from Steve Johnson.

== Plot ==
Tanya is a female model in Toronto who lives with her boyfriend Lobo, a surrealist painter who is extremely violent. Subjected to Lobo's constant abuse, Tanya dreams of escaping to a desert island, and her dream comes true. The only other person on her island is an enormous blue-eyed man-ape who emerged from one of Lobo's paintings. Tanya befriends the beast and nicknames him "Blue." Soon she begins to feels a strange attraction to the creature, which makes Lobo increasingly jealous in the real world. He becomes determined to capture the man-ape and put it in a cage.

== Cast ==
- Vanity as Tanya (credited as D.D. Winters)
- Richard Sargent as Lobo
- Mariette Lévesque as Kelly
- Don McLeod as Blue (credited as Don McCloud)
- Donny Burns as Blue's Voice

== Production ==
Mick Garris and Alfred Sole had written the screenplay together, but their work on the final film went uncredited as producer Pierre Brousseau who came up with the initial idea changed the script notably making Blue more threatening and less sympathetic than in the initial draft. When Sole and Brousseau approached Rick Baker about doing the creature effects, the two envisioned a standard gorilla design but Baker only agreed to do the creature work if he was given free rein on the design. As Baker wanted to create something new and exotic, he opted for a mixture of baboon and orangutan which he nicknamed a "Boom-Orang." As Baker had to leave due to commitments on The Incredible Shrinking Woman, Baker's designs were entrusted to Rob Bottin.
