= 7 Minutes =

7 Minutes may refer to:

- 7 Minutes (2014 film), an American crime thriller drama film
- 7 Minutes (2016 film), an Italian-Swiss-French drama film
- 7 Minutes (song), a song by Dean Lewis

== See also ==
- Seven Minutes (disambiguation)
