= Pandemonium (1982 film) =

1982 comedy film directed by Alfred Sole spoofing horror movies

- Directed by: Alfred Sole
- Written by: Jaime Klein; Richard Whitley
- Produced by: Doug Chapin
- Starring: Tom Smothers; Carol Kane; Judge Reinhold; Paul Reubens; Debralee Scott; Candice Azzara
- Cinematography: Michel Hugo
- Edited by: Eric Jenkins
- Music by: Dana Kaproff
- Production companies: United Artists; Krost/Chapin Productions; TMC Venture
- Distributed by: MGM/UA Distribution and Marketing
- Release date: April 2, 1982
- Running time: 82 minutes
- Country: United States
- Language: English
- Budget: $5 million

Pandemonium is a 1982 American parody slasher film. It was directed by Alfred Sole and features an ensemble cast including Tom Smothers, Eileen Brennan, Phil Hartman, Tab Hunter, Judge Reinhold, Carol Kane, David Lander, Eve Arden, and Paul Reubens.

The film went into production under the working title of Thursday the 12th. The film was the last feature in which Eve Arden appeared and also the last feature film Sole directed in his career.

The film is set in Indiana, focusing on a fictional cheerleading camp. The camp closed in 1963, following the murders of several cheerleaders at an affiliated university. Nearly twenty years later, a veteran cheerleader re-opens the camp and ignores warnings about a supposed curse on the camp. The killings soon start again. The killer turns out to be a local celebrity, who never fulfilled his dreams of becoming a cheerleader.

Pandemonium was released in theatres on April 2, 1982.

== Plot ==
In the fictional town of It Had To Be, Indiana, fullback Blue Grange scores the winning touchdown for It Had To Be University in the 1963 National Championship game. Afterwards, a shunned cheerleader named Bambi is seen fawning over Grange's locker before the on-field celebration pours into the locker room. As a group of cheerleaders are cleaning up the field after the game, all five are skewered with a javelin thrown by an unknown assailant. The bizarre murder makes headlines, as does a subsequent murder involving exploding pompons. As a result, the college's summer cheerleading camp is closed down. In 1982, the camp reopens with Bambi as the instructor. After arriving on campus, she meets Pepe the maintenance man and his mother Salt, who warn her against reopening the camp as they believe it to be cursed with death.

At a bus station, a young woman named Candy (labeled Victim #1) prepares to depart for the cheerleading camp but her religious fanatic mother tries to dissuade her. As they quarrel, red beams of light streak from Candy's eyes and levitate her mother into the air. Candy then marches away to catch the bus. Elsewhere, a male cheerleader named Glenn Dandy (Victim #2) says goodbye to his eccentric family before leaving for camp. Next, Mandy (Victim #3) is introduced by her father in a beauty pageant-style interview, revealing her obsession with dental hygiene. Sandy (Victim #4) asks for directions to the camp at a food truck and decides to hitchhike, eventually accepting a ride with then-U.S. President Ronald Reagan. Andy and Randy (Victims #5 and #6 respectively), two lecherous male cheerleaders, are shown smoking marijuana while driving to the camp.

Meanwhile, a Canadian Mountie named Sgt. Reginald Cooper phones Warden June to express his concerns about the new cheerleading camp. He also learns of an escaped convict named Jarrett who murdered his entire family with a hand drill and turned them into bookshelves. Cooper then leaves the station in the care of his irritable assistant Johnson to visit the Indiana State Asylum, where he inquires about another recent escapee named Fletcher, who is shown hitching a ride to the college with Jarrett.

The cheerleaders begin training, unaware that a mysterious figure is stalking them. Cooper arrives to meet the cheerleaders and quickly falls in love with Candy, singing a duet with her. Inspired, Glenn dresses in a tuxedo and attempts to woo Mandy, but fails to catch her during a routine practice drill and she breaks her ankle. Bambi calls off practice for the day, but while the others go out to eat, a guilty Glenn stays in the gym to continue practicing and is killed when the mysterious figure rigs the trampoline with dynamite. While recovering in her dorm room, Mandy is brushing her teeth when the mystery man bursts through her medicine cabinet and kills her with a hand drill.

Back at the police station, Warden June informs Cooper that Jarrett has been spotted at a local museum called Lover's Lane. He and Johnson leave to investigate and find the wrecked car Fletcher was driving, and meet Dr. Fuller from the asylum who is looking for Fletcher. Alerted by a scream inside the museum, Cooper and Johnson interrupt Jarrett before he can murder Fletcher. They discover that Jarrett and Dr. Fuller are working together in a scheme to create and sell furniture made from their victims bodies, but both deny harming any cheerleaders. Suddenly, Fletcher rises up and drives a butcher knife into Jarrett's mechanical arm, electrocuting both of them and Dr. Fuller.

Nevertheless, the slayings continue on campus. Bambi is enjoying a bath of milk and cookies when the killer reappears and drowns her. Randy, Andy, and Sandy are killed in succession, and Candy discovers their bodies before being stalked by the killer herself. She flees into the locker room where the killer reveals himself as Blue Grange, who secretly wanted to be a cheerleader and began murdering them out of angst. Candy escapes onto the football field and uses her eye beams to run down Grange with a giant statue of himself, killing him. Cooper arrives to sweep Candy onto his horse named Bob and they happily ride off the field together.

== Cast ==
- Tom Smothers as Cooper
- Carol Kane as Candy
- Paul Reubens as Johnson
- Eve Arden as the Warden
- Candice Azzara as Bambi (as Candy Azzara)
- Eileen Brennan as Candy's Mom
- Judge Reinhold as Glenn-Dandy
- Kaye Ballard as Glenn's Mom
- Donald O'Connor as Glenn's Dad
- Tab Hunter as Blue Grange
- David L. Lander as Pepe
- Phil Hartman as the Reporter
- Debralee Scott as Sandy
- Marc McClure as Randy
- Teri Landrum as Mandy

== Production ==
Alfred Sole had initially been set to direct a horror film for 20th Century Fox titled Ghouls. Its plot revolved around suspended animation. However, following the box office disappointment of Terror Train as well as a New York Times article on "The Death of Horror Films," Fox lost interest in the film and attempts to revive it at other studios were met with disinterest.

After Ghouls fell apart, producers Doug Chapin and Barry Krost instead offered Sole Thursday the 12th which was an original screenplay written by Jaime Klein and Richard Whitley after the two screened an entry of Friday the 13th and felt it was ridiculous enough to make for a parody. Over time the slasher parody elements were downplayed as the film instead became more of a broad comedy.

The film had initially been set up at Paramount Pictures, but Paramount refused to allow Chapin and Krost their choice of director and the two instead brought the film to United Artists. The film had initially been set to release around Halloween 1981, but was pushed back to a spring release date the following year. This may have been motivated by the Roger Corman produced Saturday the 14th which despite starting production after Thursday the 12th wrapped, was able to be released in August 1981 thanks to Corman's quick turnaround time in producing and releasing films. Thursday the 12th was ultimately given the new name Pandemonium.

== Reception ==
The film earned mostly negative reviews and performed poorly at the box office. AllMovie gave Pandemonium a mixed score (two-and-a-half stars out of five possible). A description of the film in the Canadian edition of TV Guide in 1990 referenced Tom Smothers' role as a Mountie, adding the commentary, "we should sue."

Rovi wrote in its review, "Tom Smothers and Carol Kane co-star with Paul Reubens and Judge Reinhold in this uneven comedy spoof of slasher films."

== See also ==
- List of American films of 1982
- Student Bodies
- Jekyll and Hyde... Together Again
