= Wild Animal =

Studio album by Vanity
- Released: November 10, 1984
- Recorded: January–February, 1984
- Studio: Allen Zentz Recording (Hollywood, California)
- Genre: R&B; pop; rock
- Length: 32:49
- Label: Motown
- Producer: Bill Wolfer; Vanity

Vanity chronology
Wild Animal (1984)	Skin on Skin (1986)

Singles from Wild Animal
- 1. "Pretty Mess" Released: September 7, 1984; 2. "Mechanical Emotion" Released: November 26, 1984; 3. "Samuelle" Released: February 12, 1985

Wild Animal is the 1984 debut studio album by Canadian singer Vanity. Released by Motown Records in November 1984, the album yielded two hit singles on the US R&B Songs chart: "Pretty Mess" and "Mechanical Emotion". The album's third single, "Samuelle", scored minor radio play yet failed to chart on either Hot 100 or R&B singles.

== Critical reception ==
Professional ratings
Review scores
Source	Rating
AllMusic	3/5 stars
The Village Voice	C−

In a contemporary review for The Village Voice, Robert Christgau gave Wild Animal a "C−" and compared the record to Vanity 6: "Where formerly she talked her way through bright, crisp, rocking high-end arrangements and kept the smut simple, here she 'sings' verbose, amelodic fantasies rendered even duller by a dim, bassy mix. And anyone who dreamed that she'd liberated herself from pornographic role-playing should get a load of the electric dildos, cum-stained frocks, and psychedelic sex slavery she flaunts as she strikes out on her own." AllMusic editor Alex Henderson was somewhat more enthusiastic in a retrospective review, giving the album three out of five stars while writing, "Wild Animal is essentially an R&B album, but Vanity laces her R&B with big doses of rock and pop. Despite her obvious limitations as a vocalist, Wild Animal is a respectable solo debut. But the public refused to take Vanity seriously as a solo artist, and this album's unimpressive sales reflected that." The fourth track, "Strap On Robbie Baby", was notable for being on the Parents Music Resource Center's list of the "Filthy Fifteen" due to its sexual overtones.

== Track listing ==
All songs published by Jobete Music Co., Inc. & Wolftoons Music (ASCAP). All lyrics and melodies composed by Vanity. All music composed, performed, and arranged by Bill Wolfer, except ^{†} lyrics composed by Robert Bruce McCan (Vanity's former boyfriend at that time).

Side 1
No.	Title	Writer(s)	Length
1.	"Flippin' Out" (featuring Ed Sanders)		5:00
2.	"Pretty Mess"		3:44
3.	"Samuelle"		4:14
4.	"Strap On "Robbie Baby"	Robbie Bruce^{†}	4:12

Side 2
No.	Title	Writer(s)	Length
5.	"Wild Animal"		4:39
6.	"Mechanical Emotion" (featuring Morris Day)		5:05
7.	"Crazy Maybe" (featuring Julian Jackson)	Vanity; Bill Wolfer^{†}	5:00

== Personnel ==
- Vanity – lead vocals, backing vocals, vocal arrangements
- Bill Wolfer – keyboards, drum programming, synthesizers
- David Williams – rhythm guitar on "Wild Animal"
- Ed Sanders – recording, mixing, additional vocals on "Flippin' Out"
- Robbie Bruce – male vocals on "Strap On 'Robbie Baby'"
- Julian Jackson – male vocals on "Crazy Maybe"
- Morris Day – male vocals on "Mechanical Emotion"

Technical

- Allen Zentz – mastering
- Daniel Poulin – photography
- The Buck – executive producer
- Bill Wolfer – producer, arranger

== Charts ==
=== Weekly charts ===
Chart (1984)	Peak position
US Billboard 200	62
US Top R&B/Hip-Hop Albums (Billboard)	14

- "Wild Animal" spent 25 weeks on the R&B Albums chart.

== Singles ==
Year	Title	US Pop	US R&B	US Dance
1984	"Pretty Mess"	75	15	13
1985	"Mechanical Emotion"	107	23	—
