= Spin the bottle =

Party game

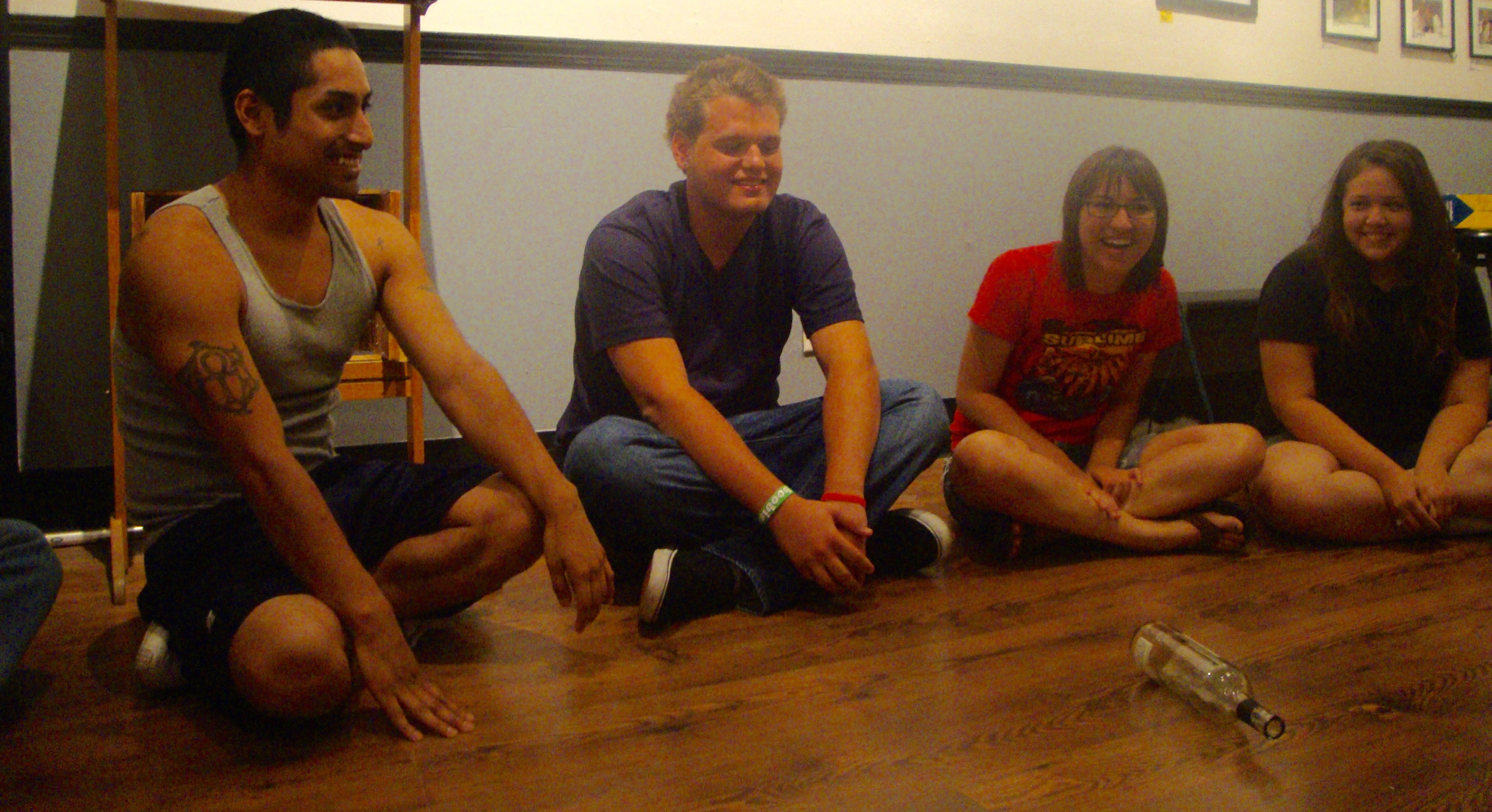
A game of spin the bottle

Spin the bottle is a kissing party game stereotypically played by teenagers. The game was very popular among teenagers during the second half of the 20th century because it fostered "sexual" interactions between boys and girls. It has been described as a coming-of-age party game.

Written records of bottle-spinning games date back to the 1920s, though early accounts make no mention of kissing. Written records of a similar game, called Bottle of Fortune, date back to 1927.

== See also ==
- Seven minutes in heaven
- Truth or dare?
