= Seven minutes in heaven (disambiguation) =

Seven minutes in heaven is a teenagers' party game.

Seven Minutes in Heaven may also refer to:

- Seven Minutes in Heaven (film), released 1985
- Seven Minutes in Heaven (play), first produced 2009
- 7 Minutes in Heaven with Mike O'Brien, a web series created by Mike O'Brien (actor)
- "7 Minutes In Heaven (Atavan Halen)", a song by Fall Out Boy (band)
- "Seven Minutes in Heaven", a song by Mindless Self Indulgence
- "Seven Minutes in Heaven" (Daredevil), an episode of Daredevil
