= Rob Bottin =

American special make-up effects creator (born 1959)

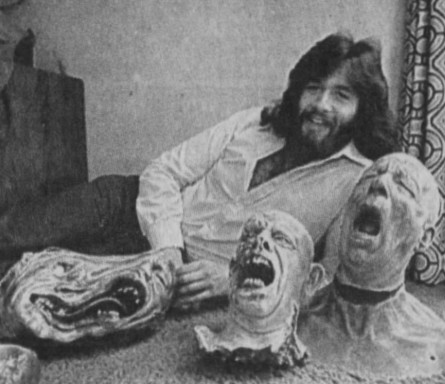
- Bottin in 1982
- Born: April 1, 1959 (age 67); El Monte, California, U.S.
- Occupation: Special make-up effects creator
- Years active: 1976–2002; 2014
- Height: 6 ft 5 in (196 cm)

Robin R. Bottin (born April 1, 1959) is an American special make-up effects creator. Known for his collaborations with directors John Carpenter, Paul Verhoeven and David Fincher, Bottin worked with Carpenter on both The Fog and The Thing, with Verhoeven on RoboCop, Total Recall and Basic Instinct, and with Fincher on Se7en and Fight Club. His many other film credits include The Howling, Legend, Innerspace and Fear and Loathing in Las Vegas.

Well respected in his field of prosthetic makeup (better known as special make-up effects), and described in 2013 as a "special effects genius", Bottin was nominated for an Oscar in 1986 for Best Makeup, and was awarded a Special Achievement Academy Award at the 1991 Academy Awards. He has two BAFTA nominations, and won two Saturn Awards with five further nominations.

== Early life ==
Bottin was born in the Los Angeles suburb of El Monte, California. His father was a foreman for a van and storage company. From an early age Bottin enjoyed a steady stream of old horror films, as well as magazines like Famous Monsters of Filmland.

== Career ==
At age 14, Bottin sent an autograph request which included one of his intricate drawings to well-known special make-up effects artist Rick Baker, who promptly invited him to discuss monsters with him. Eventually he was offered to apprentice with Baker on various films, such as the Star Wars Cantina scene creatures. Bottin portrayed the tallest player in the Cantina band.

His first big solo break was The Howling, where he was called to create an on-screen transformation from man to werewolf when Rick Baker's schedule was busy with a different production. Notably, Bottin's effect in The Howling appeared five months before his mentor Baker's similar scene in An American Werewolf in London.

After asking cinematographer Dean Cundey to introduce him to director John Carpenter, Bottin was hired by Carpenter to create the special makeup effects for his 1980 film The Fog. In that film, Bottin provided the physical makeup effects, and had a small part in the film as Captain Blake.

Bottin's reputation grew when he again worked with Carpenter on The Thing. Bottin worked on The Thing seven days a week (including late nights) for a year and five weeks straight, producing every creature effect (with the exception of the transformed dog, which was partially done by Stan Winston). Bottin's schedule was so punishing, and his attention to detail so precise, that after filming finished, he was hospitalised with exhaustion and pneumonia.

Although his work was at first criticized for being too gruesome or distracting from the film's psychological themes, it has since been credited for actually enhancing the feel of the film. In one scene in which a character's head stretches off, Bottin decided to melt plastic. Little did he know that the melted plastic released explosive paint thinner so when the director decided to put flame under the camera lens the entire prosthetic exploded.

He later worked on the special make-up effects in Ridley Scott's Legend, which earned him an Academy Award nomination for Best Makeup.

Notably, Bottin designed and built the RoboCop suit in Paul Verhoeven's RoboCop, and designed and built many striking special effects in Verhoeven's Total Recall, the latter of which earned Bottin a Special Achievement Academy Award.

Bottin is believed to have retired from the industry in 2002 due to filmmakers' shift to focusing on CGI for both action and horror, although he briefly returned to the industry to do some practical work for Game of Thrones in 2014.

== Filmography ==
- King Kong (1976)
- Star Wars (1977)
- Piranha (1978)
- Manbeast! Myth or Monster? (1978)
- Rock 'n' Roll High School (1979)
- The Fog (1980)
- Humanoids From the Deep (1980)
- Tanya's Island (1980)
- The Howling (1981, also associate producer)
- The Thing (1982)
- Twilight Zone: The Movie (segment 3) (1983)
- Explorers (1985)
- Legend (1985)
- The Witches of Eastwick (1987)
- Innerspace (1987)
- RoboCop (1987)
- Total Recall (1990)
- RoboCop 2 (1990)
- Bugsy (1991)
- Basic Instinct (1992)
- RoboCop 3 (1993)
- Se7en (1995)
- Mission: Impossible (1996)
- Mimic (1997)
- Deep Rising (1998)
- Fear and Loathing in Las Vegas (1998)
- Fight Club (1999)
- Charlie's Angels (2000)
- Mr. Deeds (2002)
- Serving Sara (2002)
- Game of Thrones (2014)
