= Never Too Young to Die =

- Home video cover
- Directed by: Gil Bettman
- Screenplay by: Steven Paul; Anton Fritz
- Story by: Steven Paul
- Produced by: Steven Paul
- Starring: John Stamos; Vanity; Gene Simmons; George Lazenby; Robert Englund
- Cinematography: David Worth
- Edited by: Paul Seydor; Ned Humphreys
- Music by: Lennie Niehaus
- Distributed by: Paul Entertainment
- Release date: June 13, 1986
- Running time: 97 minutes
- Country: United States
- Language: English
- Budget: $3 million
- Box office: $393,456

Never Too Young to Die is a 1986 American action film directed by Gil Bettman. It stars John Stamos as Lance Stargrove, a young man who, with the help of secret agent Danja Deering (played by singer Vanity, also known as Denise Matthews) must avenge the death of his secret-agent father (George Lazenby) at the hands of Velvet Von Ragnar (Gene Simmons).

== Plot ==
Velvet Von Ragnar is a powerful murderous psychopathic gang leader, but also a hermaphrodite who prides himself on being both a man and a woman. He's holding a gang rally where he announces his plans to poison the water supply and pipeline of a major US city. However, top US secret agent and double-O counterpart Drew Stargrove steals a key component he needs to pull this off. After an action packed shoot out, Stargrove is surrounded and although he puts up a good fight, he is eventually killed by Von Ragnar. However, the component is not on him. When his estranged son Lance, a talented high-school gymnast, receives word of his father's death, the government claims that he's been killed in a car accident, which Lance does not believe. Lance learns that part of his inheritance is a farm he never knew his father had. The only person living there is Danja Deering, a beautiful female spy colleague of Drew. Two of Von Ragnar's henchmen assault her, thinking that she has the component. Lance arrives just in time to help her defeat the attacker, destroying his barn in the process. After Danja explains the situation to him, they team up to stop Von Ragnar. Both sides have their own tech experts to assist them in their quest—Velvet Von Ragnar has nerdy Riley and Lance has his Asian-American roommate and tech genius Cliff.

== Cast ==
- John Stamos as Lance Stargrove
- Vanity as Danja Deering
- Gene Simmons as Carruthers / Velvet Von Ragnar
- Robert Englund as Riley
- George Lazenby as Drew Stargrove
- Peter Kwong as Cliff
- Ed Brock as Pyramid
- John Anderson as Arliss
- Randy Hall as Minkie
- Branscombe Richmond as Minkie's Partner

== Reception ==
Brian Salisbury of Film School Rejects called Stamos's performance "quite flat and dull. He seems as if he rolled out of bed and directly onto set without having read a single page of the script." He criticized the film's depiction of the punk subculture as inaccurate, but called it "the kind of film that could only exist in the 80s", and noted "Gene Simmons' insane-but-somehow-captivating-in-a-way-that-will-cost-my-therapist-thousands-of-hours-of-his-life performance".

Rob Dean of The A.V. Club called the film "an incredible schlockfest in plot, characterization, and pretty much every other component of filmmaking", and wrote that "it has certainly left an indelible mark on many hearts of those who love cheesy action flicks."

In a retrospective assessment of the film, Stamos has stated: "It's the perfect midnight-movie, where people can come and dress up. It's – what's the term I'm looking for? – the best worst thing you will ever see."
