= Pretty Mess (Vanity song) =

1984 single by Vanity

Single by Vanity

from the album Wild Animal
- B-side: "Mechanical Emotion"
- Released: September 7, 1984
- Genre: R&B; dance-pop
- Length: 3:44
- Label: Motown Records
- Songwriter(s): Vanity
- Producer(s): Bill Wolfer; Vanity

Vanity singles chronology
| "Pretty Mess" (1984) | "Mechanical Emotion" (1985) |

"Pretty Mess" is a 1984 song released by Canadian singer Vanity. The song was the lead single in support of her debut studio solo album, Wild Animal on Motown Records. The single peaked at No. 15 on the Hot Black Singles and No. 13 on the Hot Dance Club Play charts in Billboard Magazine.

== Track listing ==
US 7" Single

| No. | Title | Length |
|---|---|---|
| 1. | "Pretty Mess" (Album Version) | 3:44 |
| 2. | "Pretty Mess" (Instrumental) | 3:44 |

UK 7" Single

| No. | Title | Length |
|---|---|---|
| 1. | "Pretty Mess" (Vocal) | 6:03 |
| 2. | "Pretty Mess" (Instrumental) | 4:34 |

== Charts ==
| Chart (1984) | Peak position |
|---|---|
| US Billboard Hot 100 | 75 |
| US Hot Black Singles (Billboard) | 15 |
| US Hot Dance Club Play (Billboard) | 13 |
