= Drew Snyder =

American actor

Drew Snyder (born September 25, 1946 in Buffalo, New York) is an American actor of film and television. He is best known for his roles in films such as Commando, Firestarter, and Cruel Intentions, as well as numerous guest and recurring roles in several well-known television series including American Horror Story, NYPD Blue, and Life Goes On.

== Selected filmography ==
- Love of Life (1973) – Dan Phillips
- Kojak (1977) – Stuart Bayliss
- The Incredible Hulk (1979) – Croft
- Night School (1981) – Vincent Millett
- CHiPs (1981) – Joshua
- Death Wish II (1982) – Deputy Commissioner Hawkins
- Another World (1982) – Sam Egan
- Magnum, P.I. (1982) – Jack Curry
- Seven Brides for Seven Brothers (1982) – Coach
- WarGames (1983) – Ayers
- Space Raiders (1983) – Aldebarian
- Emerald Point N.A.S. (1984) – Malcolm Endicott
- Hill Street Blues (1984) – Hit Man
- Purple Hearts (1984) – Lieutenant Colonel Larimore
- Firestarter (1984) – Orville Jamieson
- The Falcon and the Snowman (1984) – FBI Interrogator
- Dynasty (1985) – Hank Lowther
- Commando (1985) – Lawson
- Ryan's Hope (1986) – Harlan Ransome
- The Secret of My Success (1987) – Burt Foster
- ABC Afterschool Specials (1980–1988) – Pharmacies
- Baywatch (1990) – Jack Burton
- 21 Jump Street (1990) – Mr. Van Every
- No Secrets (1991) – Driver
- Project Eliminator (1991) – FBI Agent Willis
- Late for Dinner (1991) – Albert
- L.A. Law (1990–1992) – Bernard Lavelle
- Dance with Death (1992) – Hopper
- Universal Soldier (1992) – Charles
- Life Goes On (1992) – Bill Swanson
- Born Yesterday (1993) – Senator Dorn
- Snapdragon (1993) – Coroner
- The Glass Shield (1994) – Sheriff Sergeant
- Separate Lives (1995) – Robert Porter
- Jade (1995) – Executive
- Nixon (1995) – Moderator
- The Fan (1996) – Burrows
- Dark Skies (1996) - Gerald Ford
- JAG (1997) – Judge
- Ground Control (1998) – David, Flight 47 Pilot
- ER (1999) – Mr. Drane
- Cruel Intentions (1999) – Headmaster Hargrove
- Touched by an Angel (1999) – Doug Randolph
- The Practice (1999) – Assistant District Attorney Thompson
- Ally McBeal (1999) – Hughes
- The Operator (2000) – Richard Blackburn
- NYPD Blue (2000) – Oscar Webb
- 7th Heaven (2000) – Jack Connelly
- Lost Souls (2000) – Doctor
- The Glass House (2001) – Mr. Morgan
- Hokum County Homicide (2002) – George Reynolds
- Determination of Death (2002) – Riley
- Cold Case (2005) – Billy Jones 2005
- Zombie Bankers (2010) – Carson
- Ovation (2015) – Party Guest
- American Horror Story (2015) – Televangelist
- Code Black (2016) – Arlo
