= Action Jackson (soundtrack) =

Action Jackson: Original Soundtrack Album

Soundtrack album by Various Artists/Vanity
- Released: March 8, 1988
- Recorded: 1987–1988
- Genres: Pop, Funk, Soul, R&B
- Length: 45:56
- Label: Lorimar
- Producers: Richard Perry, Bernadette Cooper LeVert, Jesse Johnson; Kae Williams Jr, Phillip Lightfoot; Jeff Lorber, Randy Muller; Solomon Roberts Jr, Stevie Salas

Vanity albums chronology
Skin on Skin (1986)	Action Jackson: Original Soundtrack Album (1988)

Singles from Action Jackson: Original Soundtrack Album
- 1. "He Turned Me Out" Released: January 9, 1988; 2. "Undress" Released: April 27, 1988

Action Jackson: Original Soundtrack Album is the official soundtrack album for the 1988 film Action Jackson starring Carl Weathers, Vanity, Craig T. Nelson, and Sharon Stone. The soundtrack album was produced by Richard Perry, Jeff Lorber, Stevie Salas, as well as Jesse Johnson and Bernadette Cooper. The soundtrack features new music by Herbie Hancock, The Pointer Sisters' R&B hit "He Turned Me Out", LeVert and Sister Sledge.

The soundtrack also includes three new songs by Vanity, "Faraway Eyes" and "Undress" written and produced by former The Time member and musician Jesse Johnson, and "Shotgun" with saxophonist Dave Koz. Koz himself also provides lead vocals on "Shotgun" with Vanity.

== Track listing ==
US, Europe 12" Vinyl LP, record, compact cassette, and CD

No.	Title	Writer(s)	Performer(s)	Length
1.	"He Turned Me Out"	LeMel Humes; Mary Lee Kortes	The Pointer Sisters	4:25
2.	"Action Jackson"	Bernadette Cooper	Madame X	5:01
3.	"For the Love of Money"	Kenneth Gamble; Leon Huff; Anthony Jackson	LeVert	5:24
4.	"Undress Me"	Kim Cage; Vanity	Vanity	4:10
5.	"Building Up (Action Jackson)"	Herbie Hancock	Herbie Hancock	4:05
6.	"Keeping Good Loving"	Kae Williams Jr; Kathy Sledge	Sister Sledge	5:24
7.	"Shotgun"	Autry DeWalt II	Dave Koz and Vanity	4:12
8.	"Faraway Eyes"	Sue Ann Carwell; Jesse Johnson	Vanity	4:24
9.	"Lover's Celebration"	Randy Muller	Skyy	3:46
10.	"Protect and Serve"	Stevie Salas	MC Jam & Pee Wee Jam	5:05
