= Skin on Skin (album) =

Studio album by Vanity
- Released: May 24, 1986
- Recorded: 1985–1986; Fiddlers Recording Studio; Soundcastle Recording Studio
- Genre: R&B
- Length: 34:38
- Labels: Motown; 9-6102
- Producers: Skip Drinkwater; Tommy Faragher

Vanity chronology
Wild Animal (1984)	Skin on Skin (1986)	Action Jackson (1988)

Singles from Skin on Skin
- 1. "Under the Influence" Released: April 12, 1986; 2. "Animals" Released: September 5, 1986

Skin on Skin is the second and final studio album by Canadian singer Vanity, released on May 24, 1986, by Motown Records. This out of print recording was originally released on LP (6167ML) and cassette (6167MC) through Motown Records and distributed in Europe by RCA/Ariola. The album features the R&B singles "Under the Influence" and "Animals".

== Critical reception ==
Professional ratings
Review scores
Source	Rating
The Rolling Stone Album Guide	1/5 stars

The Rolling Stone Album Guide wrote that "Under the Influence" "masks her vocal limitations enough to seem listenable."

== Track listing ==
Side 1
No.	Title	Writer(s)	Length
1.	"Under the Influence"	Robbie Nevil; Tommy Faragher; Tony Haynes	5:08
2.	"Manhunt"	J.P. Charles; Mark Holding	4:08
3.	"Romantic Voyage"	David Paul Bryant; Gardner Cole	4:50
4.	"Confidential"	Mark Mueller; Robbie Nevil; Tommy Faragher	4:20

Side 2
No.	Title	Writer(s)	Length
5.	"Animals"	J.P. Charles; Mark Holding	4:46
6.	"Skin on Skin"	Gary Osborne; Johnny Warman	4:11
7.	"Gun Shy"	Mark Holding; Tommy Faragher	3:44
8.	"Ouch"	Dennis Herring; Michael E. Dunlap; Tommy Faragher	4:17
9.	"In the Jungle"	Jay Gruska; Paul Gordon	5:24

== Personnel ==
- Vanity – lead vocals
- Robbie Nevil – guitar (tracks: 1, 4)
- Gardner Cole – synthesizer (tracks: 3)
- Paulinho Da Costa – percussion (tracks: 1, 3, 4, 5)
- Alfie Silas – backing vocals (tracks: 1, 2, 4, 8, 9)
- Dee Dee Bellson – backing vocals (tracks: 2, 3, 5)
- Donna DeLory – backing vocals (tracks: 2, 5, 6)
- Jean Johnson – backing vocals (tracks: 2, 4, 8)
- Von Faggett – backing vocals (tracks: 2, 4, 6, 7)
- Carl Anderson, Joe Pizzulo, Phyllis St. James – backing vocals (tracks: 9)
- Rege Burrell – backing vocals

Technical

- Dave Bianco – engineer
- Dennis Mackay – engineer
- Keith Seppanen – engineer
- Greg Fulginiti – mastering
- Matthew Rolston – photography
- Janet Levinson – design
- "The Buck" – executive producer
- Skip Drinkwater – producer
- Tommy Faragher – producer

Recorded in California at Fiddlers Recording Studio, Hollywood; Preferred Sound, West Hollywood; Baby 'O Recorders, Hollywood; Summa Studio, West Hollywood; Soundcastle Recording Studios, Los Angeles; & Yamaha Research & Development Studio, Glendale.
Mixed at Yamaha Research & Development Studio except "Under The Influence" mixed at Soundcastle Recording Studios. Mastered at Artisan Sound, Hollywood, California

== Charts ==
=== Weekly charts ===
Chart (1986)	Peak position
US Billboard 200	66
US Top R&B/Hip-Hop Albums (Billboard)	18

- Billboard R&B Albums (spent 19 weeks on the chart).

== Singles ==
Year	Title	US Pop	US R&B	US Dance
1986	"Under the Influence"	56	9	6
1986	"Animals"	—	—	—
