= Alfred Sole =

American film director (1943–2022)

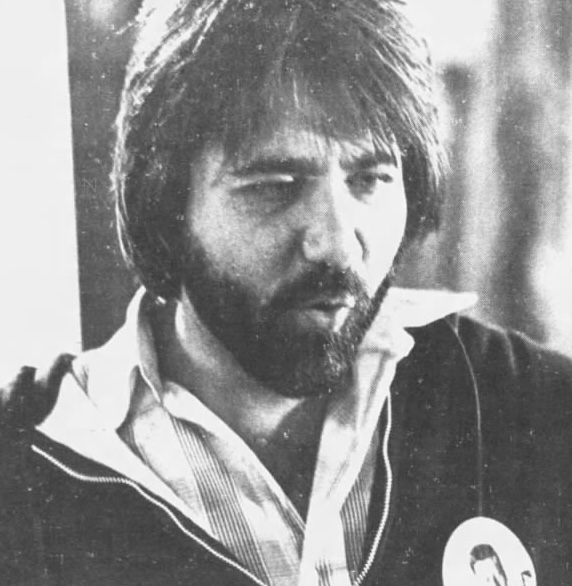
- Sole c. 1976
- Born: July 2, 1943; Paterson, New Jersey, U.S.
- Died: February 14, 2022 (aged 78); Salt Lake City, Utah, U.S.
- Education: University of Florence
- Occupations: Director; production designer; screenwriter
- Relatives: Dante Tomaselli (cousin)

Alfred Sole (July 2, 1943 – February 14, 2022) was an American production designer, film director, producer, and writer best known for directing such films as Alice, Sweet Alice (1976) and Pandemonium (1982). Prior to beginning his career in film, Sole worked as an architect. From the 1990s, he worked as a production designer on various television films and series, including Veronica Mars (2004–2007) and Castle (2009–2016).

== Early life and career ==
Sole was born July 2, 1943, in Paterson, New Jersey, where he was then raised. He was of Italian descent and raised a Roman Catholic. He graduated from the University of Florence in Italy with a degree in architecture and spent his young adulthood working as an architect.

In 1972 Sole made his directorial debut with his erotic film Deep Sleep. Made a budget of $25,000, the movie was pulled from theaters on charges that it was obscene, and all the prints were confiscated.

Sole's second feature, Alice, Sweet Alice fared better. The film was the feature debut of Brooke Shields, who appeared in a supporting part. The film initially did poorly in theaters due to spotty distribution. It was later rereleased in 1981 as Holy Terror, marketing upon the popularity of Brooke Shields.Alice, Sweet Alice eventually proved to have an enduring popularity: In 2017, it was ranked the fourth-best slasher film of all time by Complex magazine.

Sole's next feature Tanya's Island, starring Vanity, also did poorly in theaters. In 1982 his slasher film Pandemonium premiered. It was the last feature film Sole directed. Thereafter Sole worked as a production designer for multiple TV movies and shows. He co-wrote two episodes of Hotel with Paul Monette. From 2009 to 2016, Sole served as the production designer for the network series Castle.

In the late-2010s, Sole relocated from Los Angeles to a farm in Salt Lake City, Utah, with his husband, Rodrigo.

Sole died by suicide at his home in Salt Lake City, Utah on February 14, 2022, at the age of 78. He was survived by his son, Rueben, and husband, Rodrigo.

== Filmography ==
=== Film ===
Year	Title	Director	Writer	Production designer	Notes	Ref.
1972	Deep Sleep	Yes	No	No	Pornographic film	
1976	Alice, Sweet Alice	Yes	Yes	No	Alternate titles: Communion, Holy Terror	
1980	Tanya's Island	Yes	No	No		
1982	Pandemonium	Yes	No	No		
1984	Cheeseball Presents	Yes	Yes	No	Television film	
1986	Under Siege	No	Yes	No	Television film	
1988	Secret Witness	No	Yes	No	Television film	
1994	Natural Selection	No	No	Yes	Television film	
1994	Shattered Image	No	No	Yes	Television film	
1995	Bodily Harm	No	No	Yes		
1995	Night of the Running Man	No	No	Yes		
1995	Glory Daze	No	No	Yes		
1996	Face of Evil	No	No	Yes	Television film	
1996	Unforgivable	No	No	Yes	Television film	
1996	Legacy of Sin: The William Coit Story	No	No	Yes	Television film	
1996	Widow's Kiss	No	No	Yes	Television film	
1996	In the Blink of An Eye	No	No	Yes	Television film	
1996	Every Woman's Dream	No	No	Yes	Television film	
1997	When the Cradle Falls	No	No	Yes	Television film	
1997	L.A. Johns	No	No	Yes	Television film	
1997	Divided by Hate	No	No	Yes	Television film	
1998	The Con	No	No	Yes	Television film	
1998	Halloweentown	No	No	Yes	Television film	
1999	Wishmaster 2: Evil Never Dies	No	No	Yes	Television film	
1999	Replacing Dad	No	No	Yes	Television film	
1999	Clubland	No	No	Yes		
1999	Johnny Tsunami	No	No	Yes	Television film	
1999	Horse Sense	No	No	Yes	Television film	
2000	Miracle in Lane 2	No	No	Yes	Television film	
2000	An American Daughter	No	No	Yes	Television film	
2001	Semper Fi	No	No	Yes	Television film	
2001	These Old Broads	No	No	Yes	Television film	
2001	Hounded	No	No	Yes	Television film	
2001	The Poof Point	No	No	Yes	Television film	
2002	Gotta Kick It Up!	No	No	Yes	Television film	
2003	Right on Track	No	No	Yes	Television film	
2004	Slammed	No	No	Yes		
2004	Halloweentown High	No	No	Yes	Television film	
2009	Hatching Pete	No	No	Yes	Television film	
2009	S. Darko	No	No	Yes		

=== Television ===
Year	Title	Director	Writer	Production designer	Notes	Ref.
1988	Hotel	No	Yes	No	2 episodes	
1988	Friday the 13th: The Series	No	Yes	No	2 episodes	
1989	Alfred Hitchcock Presents	No	Yes	No	Episode: "In the Driver's Seat"	
2003	One Minute Soap Opera	No	No	Yes		
2004–2007	Veronica Mars	No	No	Yes	64 episodes	
2006–2008	Moonlight	No	No	Yes	14 episodes	
2009	Melrose Place	No	No	Yes	Episode: "Pilot"	
2009–2016	Castle	No	No	Yes	152 episodes	
2016–2019	MacGyver	No	No	Yes	40 episodes	

== Bibliography ==
- Edwards, Matthew (2017). Twisted Visions: Interviews with Cult Horror Filmmakers. Jefferson, North Carolina: McFarland. ISBN 9781476663760.
