= The Last Dragon =

1985 film by Michael Schultz

- Theatrical release poster
- Directed by: Michael Schultz
- Written by: Louis Venosta
- Produced by: Rupert Hitzig
- Starring: Taimak; Julius Carry; Christopher Murney; Leo O'Brien; Faith Prince; Glen Eaton; Vanity
- Cinematography: James A. Contner
- Edited by: Christopher Holmes
- Music by: Bruce Miller; Misha Segal
- Production companies: Motown Productions; Delphi III Productions
- Distributed by: Tri-Star Pictures
- Release date: March 22, 1985
- Running time: 107 minutes
- Country: United States
- Language: English
- Budget: $10 million
- Box office: $33 million

The Last Dragon (sometimes listed as Berry Gordy's The Last Dragon) is a 1985 American martial arts musical-comedy film directed by Michael Schultz and starring Taimak, Vanity, Julius Carry, Christopher Murney, Keshia Knight Pulliam and Faith Prince. It was produced by Berry Gordy's Motown Productions.

The film was released in theaters by Tri-Star Pictures on March 22, 1985. It was a financial success despite a mixed reception by critics and is considered a cult classic, especially in urban Black cinema.

== Plot ==
In New York City, martial arts student Leroy Green (also known as "Bruce Leeroy") dreams of becoming a great martial artist like his idol Bruce Lee. His master explains that he has almost reached the final level of martial arts accomplishment, known as "The Last Dragon". Martial artists who reach this final level are said to be able to concentrate such mystical energy into their hands that they begin to glow. Only a true martial arts master would be able to exhibit "The Glow" over his entire body.

In possession of a medal supposedly belonging to Bruce Lee, Leroy embarks upon a spiritual journey to find Master Sum Dum Goy, who supposedly has the other half of the medal and who his master claims can help Leroy unlock the power of "The Glow".

Another martial artist, Sho'nuff (also known as "The Shogun of Harlem"), sees Leroy as the only obstacle to being acknowledged as the true master of martial arts. However, Leroy refuses to fight him when Sho'nuff's gang interrupts a screening of Enter the Dragon at a local theater. Accompanied by his minions Crunch, Beast, and Cyclone, Sho'nuff barges into Leroy's martial arts school. The gang assaults Leroy and Johnny Yu, one of Leroy's students, demanding that Leroy bow before Sho'nuff.

Meanwhile, video-arcade mogul Eddie Arkadian sends his men to kidnap local VJ Laura Charles, owner of the 7th Heaven studio, where she films a TV series similar to Soul Train. Eddie hopes to get several trashy music videos he has produced, starring his girlfriend Angela Viracco, featured on Laura's show.

The kidnap attempt is thwarted by Leroy, who fends off the thugs but loses his medal during the struggle, which Laura recovers. Later, Leroy witnesses Laura being kidnapped by Arkadian's brutish henchman Rock. A clue left behind reveals that the kidnappers work for Eddie Arkadian Productions.

Laura refuses to promote Angela's video on her program, but as Arkadian's men prepare to assault her, Leroy bursts into the room clothed as a Ninja and rescues Laura again. Back at her apartment, Laura gratefully returns Leroy's medal. Consumed with vengeance, Arkadian hires Sho'nuff to defeat Leroy and takes control of the 7th Heaven studio, capturing Laura as well as Leroy's younger brother, Richie, who has snuck in hoping to woo Laura.

Posing as a pizza delivery man, Leroy infiltrates the assumed lair of Master Sum Dum Goy within a fortune cookie factory, but is shocked to discover that the "Master" is only a computer churning out cookie fortunes, one of which reads: "He who is color blind must never follow a horse of another color". Leroy consults his former master for answers, but his master suggests that Leroy has known the answers all along.

Not wanting anyone to get hurt in the process of achieving her stardom, Angela leaves Arkadian and asks Johnny to warn Leroy about his plan. As Leroy returns to 7th Heaven, he is ambushed by an army of thugs hired by Arkadian. Leroy's students, led by Johnny, charge into the studio to even the odds. Using Laura as bait, Eddie lures Leroy to a dilapidated building where he faces off against Sho'nuff.

During the battle, Sho'nuff reveals his ability to use "The Glow", his hands pulsating with a red aura, and beats Leroy viciously before attempting to force him to acknowledge Sho'nuff as "The Master." As recent events flash before Leroy's eyes, he realizes that his former master was correct and that everything he needed to achieve the "Final Level" was within him all along. His entire body bathed in the sublime golden light of "The Glow", Leroy uses his newfound power to defeat Sho'nuff.

Arkadian appears with a gun, derides Leroy's martial arts prowess, and fires a single bullet, which Leroy catches between his teeth before detaining Arkadian for the police. Laura and Leroy reunite at the studio, where they kiss.

== Cast ==
- Taimak as Leroy Green / Bruce Leeroy
- Vanity as Laura Charles
- Julius Carry as "Sho'nuff" / The Shogun of Harlem
- Christopher Murney as Eddie Arkadian
- Leo O'Brien as Richie Green
- Faith Prince as Angela Viracco
- Glen Eaton as Johnny Yu
- Thomas Ikeda as Leroy's Master
- Jim Moody as Daddy Green
- Mike Starr as "Rock"
- Andre D. Brown as "Beast"
- David Claudio as "Cyclone"
- Kirk Taylor as "Crunch"
- Lisa Loving as Sho's Woman #3
- Ernie Reyes Jr. as Tai
- Queen Esther Marrow as Mama Green
- Keshia Knight Pulliam as Sophia Green
- Jamal Mason as Roy
- B.J. Barie as Jackie
- Ariel Reed as Hood #1
- Chazz Palminteri as Hood #2
- Henry Yuk as Hu Yi
- Michael G. Chin as Lu Yi
- Fredric Mao as Du Yi
- William H. Macy as J.J.
- Carl Anthony Payne II as Kid in Pizza Shop
- London Reyes as Dancer
- Jeffrey Dawson as Security Guard
- Verne Williams as Cujo
- DeBarge as themselves

== Production ==
The Last Dragon was based on an original screenplay by Louis Venosta, then a struggling young actor/dancer who stated he was "tired of being cast as 'Gang Member #3' in every urban film made in New York". The screenplay was purchased by Tri-Star Pictures for Motown Productions and was quickly approved for production which began in New York City locations on April 16, 1984. This was the first acting role for Taimak, a then-19-year-old black belt who learned to act on the set of this picture. Ernie Reyes Jr., martial artist and actor, made his film debut at the age of twelve in this film. Julius Carry, in the role of Sho'nuff, trained in martial arts for the film. Berry Gordy was frequently on the set and had many of his Motown artists visit. Producer Suzanne de Passe was very hands on with the project. Billy Blanks was at one point considered for the role of Leroy Green as were Wesley Snipes, Mario Van Peebles, Laurence Fishburne and even Denzel Washington. Vanity, who had just left the production of Purple Rain, was cast after Gordy signed her to a four-picture contract. Choreography was created by Lester Wilson and Lawrence Leritz.

Notable film locations include the Harlem Karate Institute of Grandmaster Ernest Hyman, Japanese Goju-Ryu, in Harlem, New York City where the Dojo and workout scenes were filmed. The Victory Theater on 42nd Street, which was an adult movie theatre, was used for the scene where Sho'nuff interrupts the viewing of Enter the Dragon. Ron Van Clief choreographed the fight for this scene in which Carry performed his own stunts. Bernstein's-on-Essex, a kosher Chinese restaurant, was used in the film with its decor intact.

== Music ==
The film has a soundtrack of the same name and features music supervised by executive producer Berry Gordy. Featured in this film is a DeBarge song, "Rhythm of the Night", written by Diane Warren. The song reached number 3 on the Billboard Hot 100 and number 1 on the Billboard R&B charts. The song was nominated for the Golden Globe Award for Best Original Song at the 43rd Golden Globe Awards. The film's Richard Perry-produced title theme sung by Dwight David was nominated for the Golden Raspberry Award for Worst Original Song at the 6th Golden Raspberry Awards, as was Vanity's song "7th Heaven".

A song on the soundtrack that benefited from critical acclaim was "Upset Stomach", written and performed by Stevie Wonder. It also marked the return of Willie Hutch to Motown with the song "The Glow". Charlene performed the song "Fire" for the soundtrack. The score was composed by Misha Segal. The love theme song called "First Time on a Ferris Wheel" was also composed by Segal with lyrics by Harriet Schock and performed by Smokey Robinson and Syreeta.

== Reception ==
The film's total gross is reported as $33 million against a production budget of $10 million. On the review aggregator website Rotten Tomatoes, 58% of 24 critics' reviews are positive, with an average rating of 5.5/10. The website's consensus reads: "The Last Dragon is a flamboyant genre mashup brimming with style, romance, and an infectious fondness for kung fu, but audiences may find the tonal whiplash more goofy than endearing." Metacritic, which uses a weighted average, assigned the film a score of 59 out of 100, based on 9 critics, indicating "mixed or average" reviews.

Neil Gaiman reviewed The Last Dragon for Imagine magazine, writing, "Will black Kung Fu whiz 'Bruce' Leroy find The Master, defeat wicked Eddie Arcadian, beat Sho-Nuff ('The Shogun of Harlem'), rescue the lovely Laura (Vanity), outsmart the jive-talking Chinese fortune-cookie people, and learn how to get down and boogie? Very probably."

In 2002, a paper in the Journal of Asian American Studies applauded the strong character development of the black hero Leroy, who reverses the stereotype of the typical Asian in an action film. The hero, while learning from an Asian Zen master (Thomas Ikeda), learns to use his internal strength and aura to overcome obstacles.

== In popular culture ==
In the LMFAO song "Sexy and I Know It" from their 2011 album Sorry for Party Rocking, rapper Redfoo references having "The Glow" and Bruce Leeroy. Redfoo is the son of music executive Berry Gordy, who also produced The Last Dragon.

Schoolboy Q references Bruce Leeroy and the glow during his feature on the Gorillaz song "Pac-Man" from their 2020 album Song Machine, Season One: Strange Timez.

As Little Movie Moments notes on their eponymous blog, "In the movie Raya and the Last Dragon (2021), Sisu says 'I got the glow!' which is a shout out to the movie The Last Dragon (1985)".

In the film, My Baby’s Daddy (2004), Eddie Griffin’s character has a baby named Bruce-Leroy.
