= Seven Minutes in Heaven (play) =

Play by Steven Levenson

Seven Minutes in Heaven is a play by Steven Levenson "that follows six high school freshman caught in the absurd, aching, terrible ecstasy of being young on a splintered night of dysfunctional party games, fumbling first kisses, ruined reputations, broken promises, and raw, raw fun." The play was first produced in 2009 in a workshop at Ars Nova, then at the Huntington Theater in Boston in May 2010 and at HERE Arts Center in New York City in June 2010. It was selected by The New York Times and Time Out New York as a "Critic's Pick".

== Synopsis ==
Six teens gather on a Friday night to hang out, and perhaps find romance. The New York Times review described the stage play as "so real that you almost believe it was written by one of its characters," a clever presentation of the awkward teenage years.

== Reviews ==
- Show Business Weekly
- Time Out New York
- New York Post
- New York Times

== See also ==
- Seven minutes in heaven
