= Action Jackson (1988 film) =

1988 film by Craig R. Baxley

- Theatrical release poster
- Directed by: Craig R. Baxley
- Written by: Robert Reneau
- Story by: Carl Weathers (uncredited)
- Produced by: Joel Silver
- Starring: Carl Weathers; Craig T. Nelson; Vanity; Sharon Stone; Thomas F. Wilson
- Cinematography: Matthew F. Leonetti
- Edited by: Mark Helfrich
- Music by: Herbie Hancock; Michael Kamen
- Production company: Silver Pictures
- Distributed by: Lorimar Film Entertainment
- Release date: February 12, 1988
- Running time: 96 minutes
- Country: United States
- Language: English
- Budget: $8–10 million
- Box office: $20.3 million (domestic)

Action Jackson is a 1988 American blaxploitation action comedy film directed by Craig R. Baxley, starring Carl Weathers, Vanity, Sharon Stone and Craig T. Nelson. The film was released in the United States by Lorimar Film Entertainment on February 12, 1988. It received mostly negative reviews, but was a moderate box office success.

== Plot ==
Detroit Police Department Detective Sergeant Jericho Jackson, known locally as "Action" Jackson, was a celebrated lieutenant in the police force. He had been demoted nearly two years prior, because of a case he headed involving the criminal son of successful businessman Peter Anthony Dellaplane. The fallout over the case also collapsed Jackson's marriage and put the Harvard Law School educated, star athlete and hometown hero at odds with the public. Even after his demotion, Jackson's continued interest leads to conflicts with his commander, Captain Earl Armbruster, but he begins investigating Dellaplane's professional exploits, eventually uncovering a string of murdered trade-union members connected to Dellaplane's company. He discovers Dellaplane is secretly maneuvering into a "behind-the-throne" seat of power, and has been using a group of assassins, The Invisible Men, to murder uncooperative union officials.

Jackson is assisted by Dellaplane's mistress, Sydney Ash, a local lounge singer and heroin addict, whom the businessman has assisted financially. He is eventually framed in the murder of Dellaplane's wife Patrice (who was actually killed by her husband, after her discovery of his plot, and her seeking help from Jackson). On the run from the police, Jackson is helped by friends from his old neighborhood: Kid Sable, a local hotel owner and retired professional boxer and Dee, a lively local hairdresser (and gossip informant) who gives Jackson a way to discreetly get to Dellaplane.

Jackson and Sydney arrange a meeting with Dellaplane's figurehead replacement for the auto union, unaware that The Invisible Men had been tracking them and allowed the meeting so that Dellaplane could confront Jackson face to face. Before he leaves with Sydney in tow, Dellaplane arrogantly reveals the reasoning for his plans and intends to exact it using Jackson as a pawn. He intends to kill Jackson, put one of The Invisible Men in his place, have him kill an important union official, and then have Jackson's charred body discovered after he failed his getaway. Jackson is rescued by Sydney's bodyguard "Big" Edd and the pair battle the Invisible Men assigned to kill him.

Jackson's escape leads to a fight at Dellaplane's mansion during the birthday party for the union leader Dellaplane plans to have assassinated. During the melee, the other members of The Invisible Men are killed by Jackson, Edd, Jackson's old partner Detective Kotterwell, and a rehabilitated young thief named Albert, with help from Kid Sable. However, Dellaplane takes Sydney hostage and hides inside a bedroom in his mansion. Jackson fights his way to the room Dellaplane is holding Sydney in. After a brief standoff, Dellaplane, a trained martial artist, challenges Jackson to hand-to-hand combat. At first Dellaplane has the upper hand, but after ramming Jackson into one of the car windows, an angered Jackson rallies and proceeds to thrash Dellaplane. In desperation, Dellaplane goes for his gun, only for Jackson to seize his own and engage in a crossfire exchange, with Jackson killing Dellaplane and receiving a wound in the shoulder. Captain Armbruster arrives with reinforcements, informs Jackson that he wants a full report on his desk in the morning and reinstates him as a lieutenant. Sydney reveals she plans to go "cold turkey" off of heroin, promising Jackson can have her "on Thanksgiving". Jackson replies, "Can I have you any sooner?" Sydney giggles and the two kiss passionately.

== Cast ==
- Carl Weathers as Sergeant Jericho "Action" Jackson
- Craig T. Nelson as Peter Anthony Dellaplane
- Vanity as Sydney Ash
- Sharon Stone as Patrice Dellaplane
- Bill Duke as Captain Earl Armbruster
- Robert Davi as Tony Moretti
- Jack Thibeau as Detective Kotterwell
- Armelia McQueen as Dee
- Bob Minor as Gamble
- Brian Libby as Marlin
- Chino 'Fats' Williams as "Kid" Sable
- David Efron as Birch
- David Glen Eisley as Thaw
- De'voreaux White as Clovis
- Dennis Hayden as Shaker
- Edgar Small as Raymond Foss
- Francis X. McCarthy as Oliver O'Rooney
- Jim Haynie as Morty Morton
- Nicholas Worth as Cartier
- Prince A. Hughes as Edd
- Roger Aaron Brown as Officer Lack
- Stan Foster as Albert Smith
- Thomas F. Wilson as Officer Kornblau
- Sonny Landham as Mr. Quick

== Production ==
Carl Weathers later said of the film:

A creation that came about when I was doing Predator and talking to Joel Silver, who loved blaxploitation movies. Joel said, "Well, you know, why don't you put something together?" So during that time of shooting [Predator] down in Puerto Vallarta, I created this story and came up with this guy – or at least this title – Action Jackson. And Joel found a writer [who] wrote the screenplay, and that was it. We got it made.

Robert Reneau was hired to write the screenplay and submitted his original draft one month and a half later. It is his first produced script, although he had briefly worked on additional scenes for Lethal Weapon. In addition to Weathers and Silver, supporting actors Bill Duke and Sonny Landham also returned from Predator, as did stunt coordinator Craig R. Baxley, who made his directorial debut with Action Jackson. Sharon Stone had already been featured in several films, but was not yet an established star and had to audition alongside many other candidates. Filming began on May 4, 1987, which Weathers estimated to have been 11 months after his initial conversation with Silver. Neither Weathers nor the production wanted the story to be set in Los Angeles, but the majority was shot there for financial reasons, and most of the Detroit footage was captured by the second unit. Paula Abdul was the music choreographer.

In 1988, Vanity, who played the role of drug addicted singer Sydney Ash, discussed her actual cocaine use during filming:

I was a real closet user when we were shooting the movie. No one knew what was going on, and I wasn't using while I was working, but as soon as we were through for the day, I was into the stuff. I really felt funny playing an addict and also knowing I was one, and maybe that helped me decide that I needed treatment.

Vanity overdosed in 1994 and struggled with health issues until her death in 2016.

A total of slightly more than 18 months spanned from pitch to release, a quick schedule for an action film. The budget was estimated at $8 million. It is the first feature produced and released by the embattled Lorimar following a regime change including the arrival of industry veteran Bernie Brillstein as president.

The musical score was composed by Herbie Hancock and Michael Kamen. The Action Jackson original soundtrack album features a theme composed by Hancock, and songs by various artists including Sister Sledge, The Pointer Sisters and co-star Vanity who is featured three times. Weathers and Vanity are in the promotional video for the Pointer Sisters single "He Turned Me Out".

== Release ==
Action Jackson's U.S. opening was scheduled on President's Day weekend in 1988, concurrently with two other black-led films, the action-oriented Shoot to Kill and Spike Lee's School Daze. The latter nearly had its limited release pushed back by Columbia to avoid perceived competition from Weathers for the attention of the African-American public, although Lee scoffed at the notion that the black audience had such uniform tastes, and won.

== Reception ==
=== Box office ===
The film grossed $4.7 million in its opening weekend, finishing in third place behind Good Morning Vietnam and Shoot to Kill. It marked the first time Lorimar had cracked the weekly box office top 10 in the U.S. The picture went on to gross $20.3 million in domestic theaters. The Los Angeles Times called it a "reasonable" performance for the studio, which did not have a track record of theatrical success, deriving most of its revenue from TV series.

=== Critical ===
Action Jackson had a largely negative critical reception. It has a score of 24% on Rotten Tomatoes from 17 reviews. On Metacritic it has a weighted average score of 36 out of 100, based on 9 critics, indicating "generally unfavorable" reviews.

Walter Goodman of the New York Times was largely indifferent to the film, mentioning that Jackson's vaunted Harvard degree did not prevent the dialogue from sounding like "junior high school locker room" talk, and that "[l]ike lots of kindred movies, Action Jackson [...] is about shattered glass and fiery explosions. There may be a few more car bodies sent to the junk heap than usual, but, then, this is Detroit." Roger Ebert of the Chicago Sun-Times gave the film one star out of a possible four and wrote: "some of the parts are good, but none of them fit and a lot of them stink". Ebert described Weathers as a good actor in supporting roles, but also believed he "doesn't have the necessary charisma" to be a leading man and was often upstaged by co-stars--particularly Vanity's performance which was "the movie’s one redeeming merit". Michael Wilmington of the Los Angeles Times acknowledged the film's commercial potential but lambasted its "almost pornographic fascination with guns and weaponry" and summed it up as "[b]ad in that dispiritingly well-mounted, press-all-the-buttons way that occasionally pulls in big audiences."

Among more positive opinions, Eleanor Ringel of Cox News Services called the film a "minor-league action movie" but praised the level of care that went into it, embodied by the casting of distinguished actor Craig T. Nelson as the main antagonist. She said, "Weathers has weathered into a decidedly more palatable action hero than his former co-star Sly Stallone." Buzz McClain of The Buffalo News conceded that the film "follow[ed] the familiar formula" of contemporary action films, but found that Craig Baxley "handle[d] Jackson's action with panache" and Weathers offered an "affable presence". The United Press International agency deemed that Action Jackson was "a brisk action film that's sure to spark a sequel" and that "Weathers comes off well."

Weathers was nominated for the NAACP Image Award for Outstanding Actor in a Motion Picture. Conversely, Vanity was nominated for the Golden Raspberry Award for Worst Actress at the 9th Golden Raspberry Awards.

== Home media ==
The film's U.S. home video debut was on July 13, 1988. Priced for rental, 200,000 copies were sold around launch in the domestic market. It is the 47th most popular video of 1988 on Billboard's yearly rental chart.

The rights to broadcast television premiere were bought by Chicago-based superstation WGN rather than by one of the main networks.

== Legacy ==
Weathers said he hoped the film would become a franchise "but Lorimar sold the lot to Sony and sold the library to Warner Bros., and that was that. It never resurfaced again, unfortunately." The unrelated 1990 film Dangerous Passion, also starring Weathers, was released in Germany as Action Jackson 2.
