= Seventh Heaven (2015 film) =

- Directed by: Or Tilinger
- Written by: Or Tilinger
- Produced by: Or Tilinger
- Starring: Ben Knister
- Music by: Lior Frenkel
- Distributed by: Minshar For Art
- Release date: January 25, 2015 (KidFilm Festival)
- Running time: 11 minutes
- Country: Israel
- Language: English*

Seventh Heaven is a 2015 Israeli hand-drawn musical comedy short film directed by Or Tilinger and produced by Minshar For Art. It made its world premiere on January 25, 2015, at the 31st annual KidFilm Festival.

== Premise ==
An earthquake leads a young shepherd with sheep into a fantastic and comic quest to return home.

== Voice cast ==
- Ben Knister as Jasio
- Mazal Damasya
- Miriam Workia
- Or Tilinger
- Rachel Frenkel
- Lior Frenkel

== Accolades ==
Seventh Heaven won four awards. The short participated in over 70 film festivals around the world.

List of festivals
Name of festival	Date of ceremony	Country	Recipient(s) and nominee(s)	
31st Annual KidFilmⓇ Festival	January 25, 2015	United States	world premiere	-
23rd ALTER-NATIVE International Short Film Festival	2015	Romania		-
25th MEDIAWAVE International Film and Music Gathering	2015	Hungary		-
8th International Children's Film Festival of Bangladesh	January 30, 2015	Bangladesh	-	-
Durham Film Festival	February 20, 2015	United Kingdom	Best Score	Won
WATERSPRITE© - The Cambridge international Student Film Festival	March 8, 2015	United Kingdom	Original Music	Nominated
MiCe 2015	March 29, 2015	Spain	-	-
12th International Children's Film Festival of Turkey	April 22, 2015	Turkey	-	-
10th Deep Fried Film Festival	September 19, 2015	Scotland	-	-
10th Athens ANIMFEST	March 26, 2015	Greece	Marathon Section	-
6th GOLDEN KUKER-SOFIA- International Animation Film Festival	May 10, 2015	Bulgaria	Best Student Film	Nominated
ANIMAZE - Montreal International Animation Film Festival (le MIAFF!)	April 19, 2015	Canada	-	-
7th CMS, INTERNATIONAL CHILDREN'S FILM FESTIVAL (ICFF)	April 15, 2015	India	World Panorama	-
TLVFest #10 - The Tel Aviv LGBT Film Festival	June 15, 2015	Israel	Best Israeli Short Film	Nominated
55th ZLÍN Film Festival - International Festival for Children and Youth	June 3, 2015	Czech Republic	Best International Animated Short Film for Children	Nominated
9th River Film Festival	June 10, 2015	Italy	-	-
20th Annual Nantucket Film Festival	June 29, 2015	United States	Kids' Shorts Program	-
Opavský páv - International Student Film Festival	April 29, 2015	Czech Republic	-	-
17th Backup Film Festival	May 31, 2015	Germany	-	-
STARTFEST Film – Student Art Film Festival	May 30, 2015	United States	-	-
12th Southside Film Festival – Independent Film Festival	June 13, 2015	United States	-	-
Pakistan International Mountain Film Festival	May 31, 2015	Pakistan	-	-
Flying Elephant Animation & Short Film Competition	May 9, 2015	India	Best Student Film	Won (1st Runner-Up)
Tintiri-Mintiri Children Film Fest	June 6, 2015	Macedonia	-	-
IndiEarth Animation Film Festival	June 28, 2015	India	-	-
18th Auburn International Film Festival for Children and Young Adults	September 18, 2015	Australia	-	-
Constantine's Gold Coin IAFF for children and youth	August 9, 2015	Serbia	-	-
8th Croq'Anime - Le Festival du Film d'Animation de Paris	September 13, 2015	France	-	-
AniFest ROZAFA - The 6th Edition of the IFF for Children, Teenagers, and Students	September 27, 2015	Albania	-	-
Ciampino International Film Festival	August 10, 2015	Italy	Best Animation Film (Finalist)	Nominated
5th Bangalore International Short Film Festival	August 30, 2015	India	-	-
6th Anibar Animation Festival	August 26, 2015	Kosovo	Kids Program	-
WIIFF - Wolves Independent International Film Festival	August 30, 2015	Lithuania	-	-
International Peace & Film Festival	November 15, 2015	United States	-	-
31st Haifa International Film Festival	October 1, 2015	Israel	Best Israeli Animation Film	Nominated
10th BIAFF - Batumi International Art-House Film Festival	October 1, 2015	Georgia	International short competition	Nominated
Erlangen Kurzfilmfestival	October 24, 2015	Germany		-
Thessaloniki Animation festival	October 25, 2015	Greece	-	-
22 Edition International Environmental Film Festival (FICMA BARCELONA)	November 12, 2015	Spain	The Little FiCMA Section	-
4th Queen City Film Festival (QCFF)	October 4, 2015	United States	-	-
TOFUZI - The 7th International Festival of Animated Films	October 10, 2015	Georgia	Best Children Film Award	Nominated
Davis International Film Festival	September 26, 2015	United States	-	-
5th Adelaide Kids Film Festival	October 31, 2015	Australia	-	-
13th Multivision Int`l Animation Arts Festival	October 30, 2015	Russia	-	-
3rd Seoul Guro International Kids Film Festival (GUKFF)	November 5, 2015	South Korea	-	-
The World Animation Celebration 2015 – Int'l Short Film Animation Festival	October 25, 2015	United States	Best Student Film in Traditional Animation	Won (1st Runner-Up)
SPARK Animation 2015	October 25, 2015	Canada	-	-
India International Animation and Cartoon Film festival (IIACFF)	October 4, 2015	India	Best International Film	Won
4th Student Cuts Film Festival	November 11, 2015	Slovenia	Out of Competition	-
13th Tindirindis - International Animated Film Festival	November 29, 2015	Lithuania	-	-
Reflections of Spirit International Film Festival	October 25, 2015	Germany	-	-
4th FICH - Festival Internacional de Cine de Hermosillo	December 12, 2015	Mexico	Best Animation Film	Nominated
Phoenix Film Festival Melbourne 2015	November 27, 2015	Australia	-	-
Palermo International Short Film Festival	December 1, 2015	Italy	-	-
Anim!Arte – 12th International Student Animation Festival of Brazil	December 6, 2015	Brazil	-	-
21st Caminhos Film Festival	December 5, 2015	Portugal	caminhos juniores	-
Animation Chico 2015	December 12, 2015	United States	Award of Merit	Won
Kinofilm 13th Edition - Manchester International Short Film & Animation Festival	February 28, 2016	United Kingdom	-	-
Goldensun Short Film Festival	January 12, 2016	Malta	-	-
3rd Chennai International Short Film Festival (CISFF)	February 15, 2016	India	-	-
5th Quebec family film festival (FCEQ)	March 6, 2016	Canada	-	-
Bellingham Music Film Festival	April 1, 2016	United States	-	-
3rd Princeton Film Festival	April 15, 2016	United States	-	-
10th New Horizon Int'l Youth Festival of Short Cinema and Animation	April 24, 2016	Russia	-	-
2D OR NOT 2D Animation Festival	April 30, 2016	United States	-	-
Chicago Independent Film Festival	July 5, 2016	United States	-	-
12th Jecheon International Music & Film Festival	August 16, 2016	South Korea	-	-
Hurra!ART Festival	August 27, 2016	Poland	-	-
3rd DC Chinese Film Festival	September 24, 2016	United States	Best Animation Short	Nominated
3rd Portsmouth International Film Festival	September 25, 2016	United Kingdom	Production Design for Animation	Nominated
28th Girona Film Festival	September 29, 2016	Spain	Infants Section	-
5th Southampton International Film Festival	October, 2016	United Kingdom		-
10th Sunnyside Shorts Film Festival	October 8, 2016	United States	-	-
8th Comedy Cluj International Film Festival	October 21, 2016	Romania	-	-
9th Lublin Film Festival	November 18, 2016	Poland		-
10th Golden Anteater International Film Festival	November 18, 2016	Poland	Little Anteaters Section	Nominated
7th Montana International Children’s Film Festival	March 3, 2017	United States	-	-
TLVFest #12 - The Tel Aviv LGBT Film Festival	June 1, 2017	Israel	Israeli Animation Collection- Animated Life	-
Anination - Jerusalem International Animation Festival	November 5, 2025	Israel	Special Screening for 10th Anniversary	-
