= Mechanical Emotion =

Single by Vanity

from the album Wild Animal
- B-side: "Crazy Maybe"
- Released: November 1984
- Recorded: 1984
- Genre: Contemporary R&B; Dance-pop
- Length: 5:05
- Label: Motown Records
- Songwriter: Vanity
- Producers: Vanity, Bill Wolfer

Vanity singles chronology
"Pretty Mess" (1984)	"Mechanical Emotion" (1984)	"Under the Influence" (1986)

"Mechanical Emotion" is a 1984 song by Canadian singer Vanity. It was released as the second single in support of her debut solo album, Wild Animal. The single peaked at No. 23 on the Billboard R&B singles chart.

== Track listing ==
US 7" single

No.	Title	Length
1.	"Mechanical Emotion"	4:10
2.	"Crazy Maybe"	4:40

UK 7" single

No.	Title	Length
1.	"Mechanical Emotion" (Vocal Mix)	5:44
2.	"Mechanical Emotion" (Instrumental)	6:20
3.	"Crazy Maybe" (LP Version)	5:05

== Personnel ==
- Vanity – lead vocals, backing vocals
- Morris Day – backing vocals
- Vanity – composer, producer
- Bill Wolfer – producer, arranger

== Charts ==
Chart (1984)	Peak position
US Billboard Hot 100	107
US Billboard Hot Black Singles	23
