= Seven Minutes to Midnight =

Seven Minutes to Midnight may refer to:

- Doomsday Clock, a symbolic clock face, representing a countdown to possible global catastrophe
- "Seven Minutes to Midnight" (Heroes), an episode of the science fiction drama series Heroes
- "Seven Minutes to Midnight" (song), a song by Pete Wylie's Wah! Heat
