= Post office (game) =

Kissing party game

Post office or postman's knock is a kissing party game played at teenage parties. It has been referred to in United States popular culture since at least the 1880s.

== Gameplay ==
The participants divide into two groups – typically a girls' group and a boys' group. Group A stays in place, while group B goes into another room designated the "post office". Each member of group A individually visits the "post office", where they receive a kiss from each member of group B, after which they return. Once everyone in group A has taken a turn, group A's room becomes the new "post office" to which group B begins sending members, where they receive a kiss from each member of group A.

== Variations ==
- In the variation "postman's knock", one person chosen by a group to be the "postman" goes outside and knocks on the door. Another person is chosen by the rest of the group to answer the door, and pays for the "letter" with a kiss. Then another person is chosen to be postman, etc. The game has many variations. In some versions, playing cards are used to select which people get to be postman and which get to be answerer in turn.
- In the variation "pony express", the "post office" is a closet or it is in some other dark room. The game is played the same, but can become more intense. It is described in the 1954 movie Phffft as "...the same as Post Office, but with more 'horsing around'".
- In Sweden, the game is referred to as ryska posten ("Russian mail/post office").

== See also ==
- Seven minutes in heaven
