= Under the Influence (Vanity song) =

Single by Vanity

from the album Skin on Skin
- B-side: "Wild Animal"
- Released: April 12, 1986
- Recorded: 1986
- Genre: Soul; funk; dance-pop
- Length: 5:08
- Label: Motown Records
- Songwriter(s): Tommy Faragher; Robbie Nevil; Tony Haynes
- Producer(s): Skip Drinkwater; Tommy Faragher

Vanity singles chronology
"Mechanical Emotion" (1985)	"Under the Influence" (1986)	"Animals" (1986)

"Under the Influence" is a 1986 song by Canadian singer Vanity. It was released on April 12, 1986 as the lead single from her second album, Skin on Skin. The song peaked at number nine on the Billboard Hot R&B Singles chart and number six on the Hot Dance Club Play chart.

== Track listing ==
US 12" vinyl single

No.	Title	Length
1.	"Under the Influence" (Mid-Day Vocal)	6:25
2.	"Under the Influence" (Early Morning Dub)	5:41
3.	"Under the Influence" (Late Night Vocal)	5:45
4.	"Wild Animal" (Lyrics by Vanity)	4:39

Notes

- "Under the Influence" Remixes - Produced by John Morales and Sergio Munzibai
- "Wild Animal" - Produced by Bill Wolfer and Vanity

== Charts ==
Chart (1986)	Peak position
US Billboard Hot 100	56
US Billboard Hot Black Singles	9
US Billboard Hot Dance Club Play	6
