= Neutron and Star =

- Also known as: Seventh Heaven
- Origin: London, England
- Genres: Trance
- Years active: 2003–present
- Labels: Amor Digital, Alter Ego Records, NOYS, Red Force Recordings, Rolling Recordings, World Of Trance
- Members: Alan Stott; Lucy Clark
- Website: www.neutronandstar.com

Neutron and Star, also known as Seventh Heaven, is a British trance duo consisting of producer/writer Alan Stott and vocalist/writer Lucy Clarke.

== Music videos ==
- "Neutron and Star - Believe" (Alter Ego Records - AE069 - 2012)
- "Neutron and Star - Just Let Go" (Rolling Recordings - 2013)

== Discography ==
=== Singles ===
- "Seventh Heaven - Broken"
- "Seventh Heaven - Illacrimo"
- "Seventh Heaven - Dolphins"
- "Mike Koglin vs Seventh Heaven - Sanctuary"
- "Mike Koglin vs Seventh Heaven - Calling You"
- "Neutron and Star - Lust"
- "Neutron and Star - Believe" (Original mix / Mike Koglin remix / Corderoy remix / Natlife remix / Alphadelta remix) (Alter Ego Recordings)
- "Neutron and Star - Losing You"
- "Neutron and Star - Time" (Original mix / Sunset mix / Corderoy remix / Natlife remix) (True Trance Recordings)
- "Neutron and Star - Just Let Go" (Original mix / Sunset mix / Corderoy remix / Natlife remix) (Rolling Recordings)

=== Remixes ===
- "Neonate - Pridian (Seventh Heaven remix)"
- "Wapskallion feat. Stace - Fine Day (Seventh Heaven remix)"
- "Mike Koglin - On My Way (Seventh Heaven remix)"
- "Lost Witness - Home (Seventh Heaven remix)"
- "Eddie Sender feat. Marcie - Be Free (Seventh Heaven remix)"
- "Gouryella - Ligaya (Seventh Heaven remix)"
- "Lost Witness - Home (Seventh Heaven's One Step at a Time remix) (ambient remix)"
- "The Killers - Mr Brightside (Neutron and Star remix)"
- "Cascada - What Do You Want (Neutron and Star remix)"
- "Coast 2 Coast - Home (Neutron and Star remix)"
- "System F - Solstice (Neutron and Star remix)"
- "Armin Van Buuren ft Jan Vayne - Serenity (Neutron and Star remix)"
- "Solarstone - Seven Cities (Neutron and Star remix)"
- "Conor Maynard - Turn Around (Neutron and Star remix)"
