= Seven minutes in heaven =

Party game

Seven minutes in heaven (or seven minutes in the closet) is a kissing party game, mostly played at teenage parties. It was discussed in American newspapers in the 1950s after a pastor criticized it in Cincinnati, Ohio.

== Game ==
Two people are selected to go into a closet for seven minutes. The participants can be selected by various methods, such as drawing lots or calling dibs. It is common for the participants to kiss or make out. However, they can do anything while waiting for time to elapse, including groping, conversation, or nothing.

It is a variation on the kissing games spin the bottle and post office. It is part of the folk culture of young people during the development of adolescent sexuality in the United States, which also includes gay chicken and conversation games such as truth or dare and "never have I ever".

== History ==
In 1952, a pastor in Cincinnati, Ohio, spoke about local young people engaging in a parlour game called "seven minutes in heaven", and he warned that the game was a work of the devil. He said that a "young man has the privilege of choosing any girl he wants...and doing whatever he pleases for seven minutes", although a young woman at the event, who had played the game, said that it involved couples who chose to make out with each other. The pastor was quoted in Associated Press and United Press International articles that were published in newspapers across the country. The pastor's campaign against the game may have made it more popular.

Other kissing games played in Ohio in the 1950s included "numbers", involving participants selected to kiss each other for one minute in a dark room. Earlier parlour games in the Victorian era sometimes involved "kissing forfeits" for people who lost a game.

A teen comedy drama film titled Seven Minutes in Heaven was released in 1986. A play about high school freshmen called Seven Minutes in Heaven, set in 1995, was produced in 2010.

== See also ==
- Kissing traditions
