= Vanity (singer) =

Canadian singer-songwriter and actress (1959–2016)

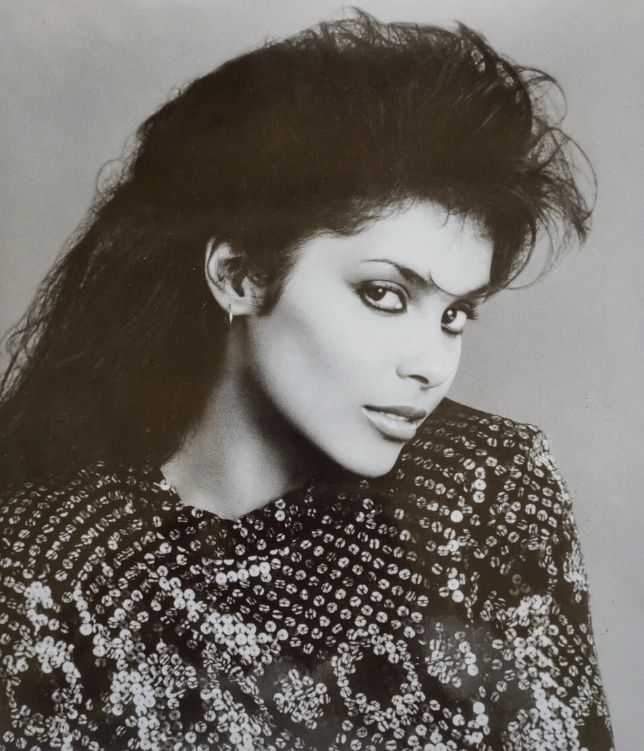
- Vanity in 1986
- Born: Denise Katherine Matthews; January 4, 1959; Niagara Falls, Ontario, Canada
- Died: February 15, 2016 (aged 57); Fremont, California, U.S.
- Other names: Denise Matthews-Smith; D. D. Winters
- Occupations: Singer; songwriter; dancer; model; actress
- Years active: 1977–1993
- Spouse: Anthony Smith (m. 1995; div. 1996)
- Partners: Prince (1982–1983); Nikki Sixx (1986–1988)
- Musical career
- Genres: R&B; pop; soul; funk
- Instrument: Vocals
- Labels: Motown; Geffen; A&M; Warner Bros.

Denise Katherine Matthews (January 4, 1959 – February 15, 2016), known professionally as Vanity, was a Canadian singer, songwriter, dancer, model, and actress. Known for her image as a sex symbol in the 1980s, in the 1990s she renounced her career as Vanity and became an evangelist.

She was the lead singer of the female trio Vanity 6, created by the musician Prince. Known for their 1982 hit song "Nasty Girl", they disbanded in 1983 when Vanity embarked on a solo career. She released two solo albums on the Motown Records label, Wild Animal and Skin on Skin, and had three minor hit singles. As an actress, she starred in the films The Last Dragon (1985), 52 Pick-Up (1986), Never Too Young to Die (1986), and Action Jackson (1988).

After years of drug abuse causing kidney problems, Matthews became a born-again Christian in 1992 and later devoted herself to her church in Fremont, California. Matthews died of kidney failure on February 15, 2016, aged 57.

== Early life ==
Denise Katherine Matthews was born in Niagara Falls, Ontario, on January 4, 1959, the daughter of Helga Senyk and Levia James Matthews. Her mother was of Polish-Jewish descent, and her father was Black American. Matthews had three sisters and several half siblings.

Her father died when she was 15 years old. Matthews revealed to Jet in 1993 that her father physically and verbally abused her for years, causing her to have a negative self-image. "For 15 years, he beat me badly... I wish I could see my father in heaven, but I won't. He's in hell," she said.

== Career ==
=== Early career: 1977–1981 ===
Matthews began entering local beauty pageants before moving to Toronto, where she modeled. She won Miss Niagara Hospitality in 1977 and competed for Miss Canada in 1978. She moved to New York City to further her career and signed with Zoli Model Agency where she began using the alias D.D. Winters professionally. Her short stature limited her to commercials and photoshoots, excluding runway work. She appeared in commercials for Pearl Drops toothpaste before completing a modeling stint in Japan. She was named one of the top sex stars of 1979 by Playboy magazine.

She appeared on the cover of Nightlife Unlimited's 1980 album Let's Do It Again.

Credited as D.D. Winters, she had a small role in the horror movie Terror Train (1980) and starred as the lead in the 1980 B-movie Tanya's Island.

=== Music and acting career: 1982–1993 ===
Matthews appeared on the cover of the funk band Cameo's album Alligator Woman (1982).

In 1982, she met musician Prince at the American Music Awards. After learning she could sing, Prince invited her to front a girl group he had formed called The Hookers. He initially wanted to name her "Vagina," pronounced "va-geen-na," which Matthews refused. They settled on Vanity, as he considered her the female form of himself. The group was renamed Vanity 6.

The group recorded one album and had international success with the single "Nasty Girl". They wore lingerie and Vanity's image became that of an erotic "nasty girl". She stated in a 1993 interview that she was uncomfortable with the image, saying "Prince created the whole Vanity 6 image. It bothered me at the time. I lied and said it was the image I wanted. I did it because he told me I had to do it. If I didn't do it, I wouldn't get paid. I got into it. I wanted the old Diana Ross image."

Vanity and Prince appeared together on the cover of the April 28, 1983, issue of Rolling Stone magazine. In August 1983, she abruptly left the group and dropped out of the 1984 film Purple Rain; her role went to Apollonia Kotero. Vanity later said, "Basically, I wanted to let 'Wild Animal' come out, and I needed to write my own songs. I needed to see if I could do something without the help of others. Now 'Purple Rain' was his really big dream. So I had to decide: Do I do his, or do I do mine?"

In 1984, Vanity signed with Motown Records as a solo artist and recorded the funk-pop album Wild Animal. She had mild success on the US pop and R&B charts with the singles "Pretty Mess" and "Mechanical Emotion."

In 1985, Vanity made her mainstream film debut in The Last Dragon, which featured her song, "7th Heaven." She wanted a role in the 1985 film The Color Purple, but Steven Spielberg thought she looked too young.

In 1986, she released her second, final album, Skin on Skin, which produced the top 10 R&B hit "Under the Influence". She starred that year in the action film Never Too Young to Die opposite John Stamos, and in the Neo-noir crime film 52 Pick-Up.

Her highest profile role was co-starring with Carl Weathers, Craig T. Nelson, and Sharon Stone in the 1988 film Action Jackson. Film critic Roger Ebert of The Chicago Sun-Times praised Vanity's performance as "the movie's one redeeming merit". In the film, she portrays a heroin addict, and during production, she was using cocaine heavily. After filming wrapped, she entered a rehabilitation program at a Los Angeles hospital.

She appeared nude in the April 1988 issue of Playboy magazine.

Vanity had roles on numerous TV programs. She guest-starred in a 1987 episode of Miami Vice's third season. She appeared in the Friday the 13th: The Series episode "Mesmer's Bauble" in 1989. She played a villain who tortured Nancy Allen's character in the 1990 TV movie Memories of Murder, and appeared in an episode of Highlander: The Series in 1992. Her last role was in the 1993 film Kiss of Death.

== Personal life ==
=== Relationships ===
Matthews met Prince at the American Music Awards in 1982. She later recalled: "I didn't know who he was, and he kept following me. I thought he was gay, and I kept thinking, 'Why is this gay guy following me around?' They soon began dating, and she left her New York City apartment, where she had been pursuing modeling and acting, and moved to Minneapolis to live with Prince. Their relationship lasted a year, until she left Vanity 6 in 1983.

She was romantically linked to Adam Ant, who wrote the track "Vanity" on his album Strip (1983), and with Billy Idol.

Mötley Crüe bassist Nikki Sixx had a crush on Matthews for years before reaching out through her management in 1986. Once they met, their relationship intensified quickly—she fell for him within hours and proposed in just three weeks. Matthews announced her engagement on The Late Show in September 1987, and joked that she would become Vanity 6 (Sixx) again. They had intended to marry at the Crystal Cathedral in Garden Grove, California in December 1987. The wedding was postponed, and then Sixx called off the engagement in 1988. In his book, The Heroin Diaries: A Year in the Life of a Shattered Rock Star, Sixx wrote that he viewed Matthews callously during this period, and she taught him how to freebase cocaine, which intensified his drug dependency.

While working as an evangelist in San Jose, Matthews read about the philanthropic activities of football player Anthony Smith of the Oakland Raiders in Los Angeles. She told Ebony magazine, "The Lord told me that I would go down to L.A. and minister to him." They met in late February 1995, and she proposed to him three days later. After a one-month whirlwind romance, they married in April at Smith's home in Playa del Rey on the first anniversary of her sobriety. Smith later revealed that they often argued about her kind nature; she would habitually invite homeless people into their home for food and showers and give out their home number to complete strangers. Their marriage ended in 1996 due to his volatile behavior. After they separated, Smith was arrested for domestic violence against another woman, and he was later convicted of three murders while a jury deadlocked on a fourth.

=== Religion ===
Matthews met actor Sam J. Jones in 1992 during filming of Da Vinci's War. Jones invited Matthews to read the Bible with him during a lunch break. Matthews became a born-again Christian, and stated in interviews that she would not play any more sexualized roles. She renounced her stage name Vanity and reverted to her birth name Denise Matthews. She traveled extensively throughout the South of the United States with her friend and agent Benjamin Jimerson-Phillips, giving her testimony of conversion to Christianity.

In 1994, Matthews rushed to the hospital for near-fatal kidney failure from a drug overdose. Doctors said she had three days to live while on life support. She remained in hospital for three months. Jimerson-Phillips telegramed her condition to Prince. She explained that Jesus appeared and said that if she promised to abandon her Vanity persona, he would save her.

Upon recovery, Matthews ended her performing career by cutting off ties with Hollywood and shunning her former life in show business. She devoted herself to born-again Christianity. In 1995, she said, "When I came to the Lord Jesus Christ, I threw out about 1,000 tapes of mine – every interview, every tape, every video, everything." Jimerson-Phillips stated: "I was there at her apartment at The Grand in Sherman Oaks, when she just started dumping things down the incinerator. I grabbed some of the items, including a painting titled Tailspin, by famed artist Olivia; a cassette hand painted by Prince of unreleased music; and an assortment of other items I didn't want to see go into the trash. I even had to go down to the office and ask them to retrieve her gold album she had thrown away."

After a kidney transplant in 1997, Matthews dedicated the rest of her life full-time to Christ. She made speaking engagements at churches worldwide and she headed Pure Hearts Ministries in Fremont, California.

In 2010, Matthews released her autobiography, Blame It On Vanity: Hollywood, Hell and Heaven.

== Illness and death ==
Due to kidney problems resulting from her decade-long cocaine addiction, Matthews had to undergo 20 minutes of peritoneal dialysis five times a day. She underwent a kidney transplant in 1997, but her health worsened in 2015 when she was diagnosed with encapsulating peritoneal sclerosis.

Matthews died of kidney failure aged 57 in a Fremont, California, hospital on February 15, 2016. She left much of her estate to her church. Her ashes were scattered off the coast of Hawaii.

== Discography ==
=== Studio albums ===
- Wild Animal (1984)
- Skin on Skin (1986)

==== Vanity 6 ====
- Vanity 6 (1982)

=== Solo singles ===
Year	Title	Peak chart positions			Album
Year	Title	US Pop	US R&B	US Dance	Album
1984	"Pretty Mess"	75	15	13	Wild Animal
1984	"Mechanical Emotion"	107	23	—	Wild Animal
1985	"7th Heaven"	—	—	—	The Last Dragon (soundtrack)
1986	"Under the Influence"	56	9	6	Skin on Skin
1986	"Animals"	—	—	—	Skin on Skin
1988	"Undress"	—	—	—	Action Jackson (soundtrack)
"—" denotes a recording that did not chart.

=== Soundtrack appearances ===
- 1985: The Last Dragon; "7th Heaven"
- 1988: Action Jackson; "Undress", "Faraway Eyes", and "Shotgun" with David Koz and featuring vocalist Kareem

=== Guest vocals ===
- 1982: 1999, Prince; "Free" (backing vocals)
- 1982: What Time Is It?, The Time; "The Walk" (spoken vocals)
- 1986: El DeBarge, El DeBarge; "Secrets of the Night" (backing vocals)

=== Music videos ===
- 1982: "Nasty Girl", "He's So Dull", and "Drive Me Wild"
- 1984: "Pretty Mess"
- 1985: "7th Heaven" (video clips were from the movie The Last Dragon)
- 1986: "Under the Influence"
- 1988: "He Turned Me Out", a song performed by The Pointer Sisters from the soundtrack of Action Jackson. Vanity's co-star in the movie, Carl Weathers, appears alongside her in the video.
- 1991: "Vanity", a song performed by Dweezil Zappa. Vanity makes a cameo appearance

== Filmography ==
=== Film ===
Vanity film credits
Year	Title	Role	Notes
1980	Klondike Fever	Background Dancer (uncredited)	Adventure, based on the writings of Jack London. Vanity plays a background dancer near the beginning of the film.
1980	Terror Train	Merry	Horror (credited as D. D. Winters)
1980	Tanya's Island	Tanya	Fantasy (credited as D. D. Winters)
1985	The Last Dragon	Laura Charles	Martial arts drama (a.k.a. Berry Gordy's The Last Dragon)
1986	Never Too Young to Die	Danja Deering	Action/crime thriller (co-starring with John Stamos and Gene Simmons)
1986	52 Pick-Up	Doreen	Crime thriller (co-starring with Roy Scheider and Ann-Margret)
1987	Deadly Illusion	Rina	Action/drama (co-starring with Billy Dee Williams)
1988	Action Jackson	Sydney Ash	Action/crime thriller (co-starring with Carl Weathers)
1991	Neon City	Reno	Post-apocalyptic science fiction (a.k.a. Anno 2053 in Italy and Neonski Grad in Serbia)
1993	South Beach	Jennifer Derringer	Action/crime thriller (co-starring with Fred Williamson and Gary Busey). Directed by Fred Williamson
1993	Da Vinci's War	Lupe	Action/thriller Directed and co-written by Raymond Martino
1997	Kiss of Death	Blair	Thriller (Filmed in April 1993, Vanity's last role) directed by Andrei Feher

=== Television ===
Vanity television credits
Year	Title	Role	Notes
1987	D.C. Follies	Vanity (guest)	Episode: "Comedy Parody" (S1.E6)
1987	The New Mike Hammer	Holly	Episode: "Green Lipstick" (S3.E21)
1987	Miami Vice	Ali Ferrand	Episode: "By Hooker By Crook" (S3.E20)
1988	T. and T.	K.C. Morgan	Episode: "A Secret No More" (S2.E6)
1989	Friday the 13th: The Series	Angelica	Episode: "The Secret Agenda of Mesmer's Bauble" (S2.20)
1989	Booker	Tina Maxwell	Episode: "Deals and Wheels: Part 1" (S1.E8) aka 21 Jump Street (S4.E10)
1990	Memories of Murder	Carmen	Lifetime Television Network (aka Passing through Veils)
1991	Tropical Heat (aka Sweating Bullets)	Maria	Episode: "Mafia Mistress" (S2.E2)
1991	Tales from the Crypt	Kathrine	Episode: "Dead Wait" (S3.E6)
1992	Silk Stalkings	Chantel	Episode: "Powder Burn" (S1.E20)
1992	Lady Boss	Mary Lou Morley	Miniseries, based on Jackie Collins' novel of the same name with the teleplay by Jackie Collins
1992	Highlander: The Series	Rebecca Lord	Episode: "Revenge Is Sweet" (S1.E10)
1993	Counterstrike	Sandra	Episode: "Muerte" (S3.E21)

== See also ==
- List of people in Playboy 1980–1989
