= Taimak =

American actor (born 1964)

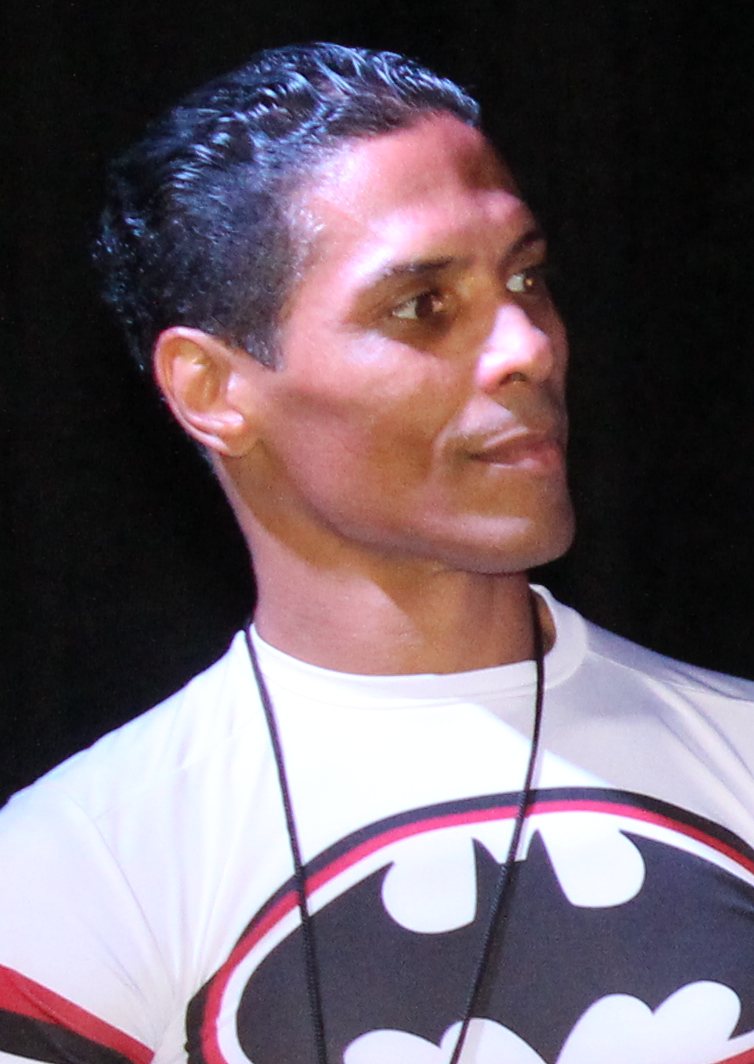
- Taimak at the 2014 Florida Supercon
- Born: June 27, 1964 (age 62); Los Angeles, California, U.S.
- Occupations: Actor; Martial artist; Stuntman
- Years active: 1982–present

Taimak Guarriello (born June 27, 1964), known mononymously as Taimak (/ˈtaɪmɑːk/), is an American actor, martial artist and stuntman, known for his lead role as Leroy Green ("Bruce Leroy") in the 1985 martial arts film The Last Dragon.

== Personal life ==
Taimak was born on June 27, 1964, in Los Angeles, California, to an Italian father and an African-American mother. He currently lives in New York City.

== Career ==
Taimak's leading role in Berry Gordy's The Last Dragon, in which he played Leroy Green, a Bruce Lee-inspired martial artist in search of "The Glow," was his first major break in acting. The film was a financial success and grossed more than $25 million at the box office.

Since The Last Dragon, Taimak has appeared in a number of TV roles and over a dozen plays.

Taimak later appeared in a number of TV roles and music videos including the lead male in Janet Jackson's "Let's Wait Awhile" music video and Debbie Allen's "Special Look" video. He played a date rapist in an episode of the TV show A Different World. He appeared in 36 Crazyfists' music video "Bloodwork".

Taimak has worked with a number of celebrities, including Madonna, and starred in the play Cheaters, which toured the United States. He starred in a hit Off-Broadway show called Roadhouse The Comedy, based on the Patrick Swayze film Road House, from December 9, 2003, to February 1, 2004, at the Barrow Street Theatre in New York.

In 2002, Taimak opened a gym called Fitness Concepts on the East Side of Manhattan. He published a fitness DVD titled Taimak FIT (Find Inner Transformation), intended to be the first of a series.

He is an accomplished martial artist and has received black belts in Goju Ryu Karate, Jeet Kune Do, Wing Chun, Hapkido, Jujutsu, Taekwondo, and Brazilian Jiu-Jitsu. He studied Chinese Goju under "The Black Dragon", Ron Van Clief.

He officiated the preliminary MMA bouts at UFC 6 and UFC 7.

In 2006 he made a few appearances alongside Jimmy Yang in Ring of Honor. Yang's character at the time had adopted some of Leroy Green's traits as his own.

In November 2015, Taimak and Cary-Hiroyuki Tagawa were honorees for the Fists of Legends Legacy Award at the Urban Action Showcase & Expo at HBO.

In March 2016, Incorgnito Publishing Press published Taimak's autobiography, Taimak, The Last Dragon.

In 2018, Taimak starred in Sean Stone's martial arts comedy film Fury of the Fist and the Golden Fleece.

In 2026, Taimak appeared as Dr. Rufus Robinson in Paper Made, a martial arts drama directed by Ryan Watson. Filmed in Tampa, Florida. The film premiered as AMC Westshore 14 in Tampa on August 28, 2026.

== Filmography ==
- Paper Made (2026) as Dr. Rufus Robinson
- Double Cross (TV series) (2023-2024) as Cade Cross
- Fury of the Fist and the Golden Fleece (2018) as Dragon
- They're Just My Friends (2006) as Captain Taimak
- The System Within (2006) as Pastor Ricky
- Book of Swords (2005) as Lucky
- Third Watch as Spider (1 episode, 2004)
  - "Family Ties: Part 2" (2004) TV episode (as Taimak Guarriello) as Spider
- Night Class (2001) as Kick boxing instructor
- Masquerade (2000) (TV)
- Beverly Hills, 90210
  - I Will Be Your Father Figure (2000) TV episode (as Taimak Guarriello) as Barback
  - That's the Guy (1999) TV episode (as Taimak Guari) as The Bartender
  - Dog's Best Friend (1999) TV episode (as Taimak Guari) as The Bartender
- Dreamers (1999) as Sam
- Red Shoe Diaries
  - The Forbidden Zone (1996) TV episode as Zoner
- WMAC Masters
  - "Battle of the Brothers" (1996) TV episode as Striking Eagle
- Kickback with Scott Pastore (1994) TV series as Guest
- No More Dirty Deals (1993) as Sean Halloway
- The White Girl (1990) as Bob
- A Different World
  - "No Means No" (1989) TV episode as Garth Parks
- The Last Dragon (1985) as Leroy Green

=== Stunts ===
- Madonna: Drowned World Tour 2001 (2001) (TV) (martial arts coordinator) (as Taimak Guarriello)

=== Self ===
- Acapulco Black Film Festival (2000) (TV) as Himself
- Singled Out
  - Episode dated 13 December 1995 (1995) TV episode as Taimuk
