= List of science fiction films of the 1980s =

A list of science fiction films released in the 1980s. These films include core elements of science fiction, but can cross into other genres. They have been released to a cinema audience by the commercial film industry and are widely distributed with reviews by reputable critics.

Collectively, the science fiction films from the 1980s have received 14 Academy Awards, 11 Saturn Awards, six Hugo Awards, five BAFTA awards, four BSFA Awards, and one Golden Globe Award. Four of these movies were the highest-grossing films of their respective years of release. However, these films also received nine Golden Raspberry Awards.

== List ==
1980
Title	Director	Cast	Country	Subgenre/Notes
Alien Dead	Fred Olen Ray	Buster Crabbe, Ray Roberts, Linda Lewis	United States	Horror
Altered States	Ken Russell	William Hurt, Blair Brown, Bob Balaban	United States	Body horror
Aquanauts	Igor Voznesenskiy	German Poloskov, Aleksandr Yakovlev, Iren Azer	Soviet Union	
Battle Beyond the Stars	Jimmy Murakami	George Peppard, Robert Vaughn, Richard Thomas, John Saxon, Darlanne Fluegel	United States	Space opera
Be Forever Yamato	Toshio Masuda, Leiji Matsumoto	Kei Tomiyama (voice), Yōko Asagami (voice), Shūsei Nakamura (voice)	Japan	Anime film
The Chain Reaction	Ian Barry	Steve Bisley, Arna-Maria Winchester, Ross Thompson	Australia	Disaster, thriller
Contamination	Luigi Cozzi	Ian McCulloch, Louise Marleau, Marino Masé	Italy; West Germany	Horror
Crazy Thunder Road	Sōgo Ishii	Tatsuo Yamada, Masamitsu Ohike, Koji Nanjo	Japan	
Cyborg 009: Legend of the Super Vortex	Masayuki Akehi	Kazuhiko Inoue (voice), Fuyumi Shiraishi (voice), Keiichi Noda (voice)	Japan	Anime film
The Day Time Ended	John Cardos	Jim Davis, Dorothy Malone, Christopher Mitchum	United States	
Death Ray on a Coral Island	Hongmei Zhang	Qi Qiao, Zhiao Ling, Zhen Qiao	China	
Death Watch	Bertrand Tavernier	Romy Schneider, Harvey Keitel, Harry Dean Stanton	France; West Germany	
The Empire Strikes Back	Irvin Kershner	Mark Hamill, Harrison Ford, Carrie Fisher, Billy Dee Williams, Alec Guinness	United States	Space opera (Note: Winner of Academy Awards for Visual Effects (special achievement award) and Sound, a Saturn Award for Best Science Fiction Film and a Hugo Award for Best Dramatic Presentation. Highest-grossing film of the year.)
The Final Countdown	Don Taylor	Kirk Douglas, Martin Sheen, Katharine Ross	United States	Alternate history
Flash Gordon	Mike Hodges	Sam J. Jones, Melody Anderson, Max von Sydow, Ornella Muti, Chaim Topol	United Kingdom; United States	Space opera
Galaxina	William Sachs	Stephen Macht, Avery Schreiber, J. D. Hinton	United States	Science fantasy, comedy
Golem	Piotr Szulkin	Marek Walczewski, Krystyna Janda, Joanna Zólkowska	Poland	
Hangar 18	James L. Conway	Darren McGavin, Robert Vaughn, Gary Collins	United States	
Nightmare City	Umberto Lenzi	Hugo Stiglitz, Laura Trotter, Maria Rosaria Omaggio	Italy; Spain	Horror
Phoenix 2772	Taku Sugiyama	Kaneto Shiozawa (voice), Keiko Takeshita (voice), Hiroshi Ôtake (voice)	Japan	Anime film
The Return (ru)	Vladimir Tarasov	Viktor Balashov (voice), Aleksandr Kaydanovskiy (voice), Vasiliy Livanov (voice)	Soviet Union	Animated short film. Russian title: Возвращение, tr. Vozvrashcheniye
Saturn 3	Stanley Donen	Farrah Fawcett, Kirk Douglas, Harvey Keitel	United Kingdom	
The Solar Wind	Timo Linnasalo	Paavo Piskonen, Lilga Kovanko, Antti Litja	Finland	Drama
Somewhere in Time	Jeannot Szwarc	Christopher Reeve, Jane Seymour, Christopher Plummer, Teresa Wright	United States	Romance
Star Inspector	Mark Kovalyov, Vladimir Polin	Vladimir Ivashov, Yuriy Gusev, Timofey Spivak	Soviet Union	
Superman II	Richard Lester	Gene Hackman, Christopher Reeve, Ned Beatty, Terence Stamp, Jackie Cooper, Margot Kidder	United Kingdom; United States	Superhero
Toward the Terra	Hideo Onchi	Junichi Inoue (voice), Masaya Oki (voice), Kumiko Akiyoshi (voice)	Japan	Anime film
Virus	Kinji Fukasaku	Masao Kusakari, Tsunehiko Watase, Isao Natsuyagi	Japan	Post-apocalyptic
Without Warning	Greydon Clark	Jack Palance, Martin Landau, Tarah Nutter	United States	Horror
1981
Adieu Galaxy Express 999	Rintaro	Masako Nozawa (voice), Masako Ikeda (voice), Kaneta Kimotsuki (voice)	Japan	Anime film
The Cabbage Soup	Jean Girault	Louis de Funès, Jean Carmet, Jacques Villeret	France	
Earthbound	James L. Conway	Burl Ives, Christopher Connelly, Meredith MacRae	United States	
Escape from New York	John Carpenter	Kurt Russell, Lee Van Cleef, Ernest Borgnine	United States	
Galaxy of Terror	B. D. Clark	Edward Albert, Erin Moran, Ray Walston	United States	
Heartbeeps	Allan Arkush	Andy Kaufman, Bernadette Peters, Randy Quaid	United States	
Heavy Metal	Gerald Potterton	Rodger Bumpass (voice), Jackie Burroughs (voice), John Candy (voice), Eugene Levy (voice), Harold Ramis (voice)	United States; Canada	Animated film
The Inauguration of a Mechanical Bird in 2895, in New York City	Sándor Reisenbüchler		Hungary	Animated short film. Hungarian title: Gépmadár-avatás 2895-ben New York Cityben, ahogy az öreg Jules Verne elképzelte
The Incredible Shrinking Woman	Joel Schumacher	Lily Tomlin, Charles Grodin, Ned Beatty, Henry Gibson, John Glover	United States	
Inseminoid	Norman J. Warren	Judy Geeson, Heather Wright, Trevor Thomas, Stephanie Beacham	United Kingdom	USA title: Horror Planet
Klaabu in Space	Avo Paistik		Soviet Union	Animated short film. Estonian title: Klaabu kosmoses
The Last Chase	Martyn Burke	Lee Majors, Burgess Meredith, Chris Makepeace	United States	
Looker	Michael Crichton	Albert Finney, James Coburn, Susan Dey	United States	
Mad Max 2	George Miller	Mel Gibson	Australia	Post-apocalyptic
Malevil	Christian de Chalonge	Michel Serrault, Jacques Dutronc, Jacques Villeret	France; West Germany	
Memoirs of a Survivor	David Gladwell	Julie Christie, Christopher Guard, Leonie Mellinger	United Kingdom	
Mobile Suit Gundam	Ryôji Fujiwara, Yoshiyuki Tomino	Tôru Furuya (voice), Hirotaka Suzuoki (voice), Shôzô Iizuka (voice), Toshio Furukawa (voice)	Japan	
Mobile Suit Gundam II: Soldiers of Sorrow	Yoshikazu Yasuhiko, Yoshiyuki Tomino	Tôru Furuya (voice), Shûichi Ikeda (voice), Hirotaka Suzuoki (voice), Fuyumi Shiraishi (voice)	Japan	
The Mystery of the Third Planet	Roman Kachanov	Vasiliy Livanov (voice), Yuriy Andreyev (voice), Grigoriy Shpigel' (voice)	Soviet Union	Animated film
Nuclear Shelter	Roberto Pires	Conceição Senna, Sasso Alano, Roberto Pires	Brazil	Eco-dystopian film. Portuguese title: Abrigo Nuclear
The Orion Loop	Vasiliy Levin	Leonid Bakshtayev, Gennadiy Shkuratov, Anatoliy Mateshko	Soviet Union	
Outland	Peter Hyams	Sean Connery, Peter Boyle, Frances Sternhagen	United Kingdom	
Per Aspera Ad Astra	Richard Viktorov	Aleksandr Mikhajlov, Gleb Strizhenov, Alexander Lazarev	Soviet Union	Alternate titles: Through the Thorns to the Stars; Humanoid Woman
Scanners	David Cronenberg	Stephen Lack, Jennifer O'Neill, Patrick McGoohan	Canada	
Scared to Death	William Malone	John Stinson	United States	
Space Warrior Baldios	Kazuyuki Hirokawa		Japan	
Visitors from the Galaxy	Dušan Vukotić	Ljubiša Samardžić, Ivana Andrlová, Cvijeta Mesic	Yugoslavia; Czechoslovakia	
The War of the Worlds: Next Century	Piotr Szulkin	Roman Wilhelmi, Krystyna Janda, Mariusz Dmochowski	Poland	
1982
1990: The Bronx Warriors	Enzo G. Castellari	Vic Morrow, Christopher Connelly, Fred Williamson	Italy	
The Aftermath	Steve Barkett	Sid Haig, Forrest J Ackerman, Jim Danforth	United States	UK title: Zombie Aftermath
Airplane II: The Sequel	Ken Finkleman	Robert Hays, Julie Hagerty, Lloyd Bridges, Chad Everett, William Shatner, Peter Graves	United States	
Anno 2020 - I gladiatori del futuro	Joe D'Amato	Harrison Muller, Al Cliver, Sabrina Siani	Italy	
Android	Aaron Lipstadt	Klaus Kinski, Brie Howard, Norbert Weisser	United States	(Note: Won a BSFA Award for media presentation.)
Arcadia of My Youth	Tomoharu Katsumata	Makio Inoue (voice), Kei Tomiyama (voice), Reiko Tajima (voice), Reiko Mutō (voice)	Japan	
Blade Runner	Ridley Scott	Harrison Ford, Rutger Hauer, Sean Young, Edward James Olmos, Daryl Hannah	United States; Hong Kong	(Note: Won a Hugo Award for Best Dramatic Presentation, a BSFA Award for media presentation, and BAFTA Awards for Best Cinematography, Best Costume Design, and Best Production Design/Art Direction.)
Burst City	Sōgo Ishii	Michirou Endo, Shigeru Izumiya, Takanori Jinnai, Kou Machida	Japan	
Button	Vladimir Tarasov		Soviet Union	Animated short film
Café Flesh	Stephen Sayadian	Michelle Bauer, Richard Belzer	United States	
Chronopolis	Piotr Kamler		France	Animated film
Creepshow	George A. Romero	Hal Holbrook, Adrienne Barbeau, Fritz Weaver	United States	Science fiction horror
Crosstalk	Mark Egerton	Gary Day, Penny Downie, John Ewart	Australia	
E.T. the Extra-Terrestrial	Steven Spielberg	Henry Thomas, Dee Wallace, Peter Coyote, Drew Barrymore, Robert MacNaughton	United States	(Note: Highest-grossing film of the year. Winner of Academy Awards for Visual Effects, Sound Editing, Sound, and Original Music Score, a Golden Globe Award for Best Motion Picture – Drama and a Saturn Award for Best Science Fiction Film.)
Endangered Species	Alan Rudolph	Robert Urich, JoBeth Williams, Paul Dooley	United States	
Forbidden World	Allan Holzman	Jesse Vint, June Chadwick	United States	
Kamikaze 1989	Wolf Gremm	Rainer Werner Fassbinder, Günther Kaufmann, Boy Gobert, Arnold Marquis	West Germany	
The Masters of Time	René Laloux	Jean Valmont (voice), Michel Elias (voice), Frédéric Legros (voice), Yves-Marie Maurin (voice)	France; West Germany; Switzerland; United Kingdom; Hungary	Animated film
Megaforce	Hal Needham	Barry Bostwick, Persis Khambatta, Michael Beck, Henry Silva	United States	
Mobile Suit Gundam III: Encounters in Space	Yoshiyuki Tomino, Yoshikazu Yasuhiko	Tôru Furuya (voice), Shûichi Ikeda (voice), Hirotaka Suzuoki (voice), Yô Inoue (voice)	Japan	
The New Barbarians	Enzo G. Castellari	Fred Williamson, Anna Kanakis, Venantino Venantini	Italy	(Note: Also known as Warriors of the Wasteland.)
Nightbeast	Don Dohler	Donald Leifert, Tom Griffiths	United States	Horror
Parasite	Charles Band	Robert Glaudini, Demi Moore	United States	Horror
Queen Millennia	Masayuki Akehi	Keiko Han (voice), Keiko Toda (voice), Ichirô Nagai (voice), Mami Koyama (voice)	Japan	
Space Adventure Cobra	Osamu Dezaki	Shigeru Matsuzaki (voice), Ryoko Sakakibara (voice), Akiko Nakamura (voice), Toshiko Fujita (voice)	Japan	Anime film
Star Trek II: The Wrath of Khan	Nicholas Meyer	William Shatner, Leonard Nimoy, DeForest Kelley, James Doohan, Nichelle Nichols, Kirstie Alley, Ricardo Montalbán	United States	(Note: Winner of Saturn Awards for Best Director and Best Actor.)
Swamp Thing	Wes Craven, Walter von Huene	Louis Jourdan, Adrienne Barbeau, Ray Wise	United States	
The Thing	John Carpenter	Kurt Russell, Wilford Brimley, T. K. Carter, Keith David, Donald Moffat, Charles Hallahan, David Clennon	United States	Horror (Note: Remake.)
Timerider: The Adventure of Lyle Swann	William Dear	Fred Ward, Belinda Bauer, Peter Coyote, Richard Masur, Ed Lauter, Chris Mulkey, Tracey Walter	United States	
Time Walker	Tom Kennedy	Ben Murphy, Nina Axelrod, Kevin Brophy	United States	
Tron	Steven Lisberger	Jeff Bridges, Bruce Boxleitner, David Warner, Cindy Morgan, Barnard Hughes	United States	(Note: Won a Saturn Award for Best Costumes.)
Turkey Shoot	Brian Trenchard-Smith	Steve Railsback, Olivia Hussey, Michael Craig	Australia	
Warlords of the 21st Century	Harley Cokliss	Michael Beck, Annie McEnroe, James Wainwright	United States	(Note: Alternate title: Battletruck.)
Zapped!	Robert J. Rosenthal	Scott Baio, Willie Aames, Heather Thomas, Robert Mandan	United States	
1983
2019, After the Fall of New York	Sergio Martino	Michael Sopkiw, Valentine Monnier, Anna Kanakis	Italy; France	
Anniversary	Vladimir Tarasov		Soviet Union	Animated short film. Russian title: Юбилей, tr. Yubiley
Anna to the Infinite Power	Robert Wiemer	Martha Byrne, Dina Merrill	United States	
The Atlantis Interceptors	Ruggero Deodato	Ivan Rassimov	Italy	
Born in Flames	Lizzie Borden	Jeanne Satterfield, Adele Bertei, Becky Johnston	United States	
Brainstorm	Douglas Trumbull	Christopher Walken, Natalie Wood, Louise Fletcher	United States	
BrainWaves	Ulli Lommel	Keir Dullea, Suzanna Love, Vera Miles, Tony Curtis	United States	
The Creature Wasn't Nice	Bruce Kimmel	Leslie Nielsen, Cindy Williams, Gerrit Graham	United States	
Crusher Joe	Yoshikazu Yasuhiko		Japan	
Daijōbu, My Friend	Ryū Murakami	Peter Fonda, Reona Hirota	Japan	
The Dead Zone	David Cronenberg	Christopher Walken, Brooke Adams, Tom Skerritt, Martin Sheen	United States	
The Deadly Spawn	Douglas McKeown	Charles George Hildebrandt, Tom DeFranco, Richard Lee Porter	United States	
Document Fang of the Sun Dougram	Ryōsuke Takahashi		Japan	
Endgame	Joe D'Amato	Al Cliver, Laura Gemser, George Eastman	Italy	
Escape from the Bronx	Enzo G. Castellari	Mark Gregory, Henry Silva, Valeria D'Obici	Italy	
Exterminators of the Year 3000	Giuliano Carmineo	Robert Iannucci, Alicia Moro, Eduardo Fajardo	Italy	
Final Yamato	Tomoharu Katsumata, Yoshinobu Nishizaki, Toshio Masuda	Kei Tomiyama (voice), Yôko Asagami (voice), Gorô Naya (voice), Isao Sasaki (voice)	Japan	Anime film
Halloween III: Season of the Witch	Tommy Lee Wallace	Tom Atkins, Stacey Nelkin, Dan O'Herlihy	United States	Horror
Harmagedon	Rintaro	Tôru Furuya (voice), Mami Koyama (voice), Masako Ikeda (voice), Keiko Han (voice)	Japan	
Kometa	Richard Viktorov	Nadezhda Semencova, Anatolij Kuznecov	Soviet Union	Comedy
Krull	Peter Yates	Ken Marshall, Lysette Anthony, Freddie Jones	United Kingdom; United States	
The Last Battle	Luc Besson	Pierre Jolivet, Jean Bouise, Fritz Wepper	France	
Liquid Sky	Slava Tsukerman	Anne Carlisle, Paula Sheppard	United States	
Metalstorm: The Destruction of Jared-Syn	Charles Band	Jeffrey Byron, Tim Thomerson, Kelly Preston, Richard Moll	United States	
Moon Rainbow	Andrey Yermash	Vladimir Gostyukhin, Vasiliy Livanov, Yuriy Solomin	Soviet Union	
A Peacemaking Expedition to Mars	Sándor Reisenbüchler		Hungary	Animated short film. Hungarian title: Békéltető expedíció a Mars bolygóra
The Pod People	Juan Piquer Simón	Óscar Martín, Concha Cuetos, Manuel Pereiro	Spain; France	
Prisoners of the Lost Universe	Terry Marcel	Richard Hatch, Kay Lenz, John Saxon	United Kingdom	
The Prize of Peril	Yves Boisset	Gérard Lanvin, Michel Piccoli, Marie-France Pisier	France; Yugoslavia	
Return of the Jedi	Richard Marquand	Mark Hamill, Harrison Ford, Carrie Fisher, Billy Dee Williams, Alec Guinness	United States	Space opera (Note: Winner of an Academy Award for Visual Effects (Special Achievement Award), a Saturn Award for Best Science Fiction Film and a Hugo Award for Best Dramatic Presentation. Highest-grossing film of the year.)
Rock & Rule	Clive A. Smith	Paul Le Mat (voice), Deborah Harry (voice), Don Francks (voice)	Canada	Animated film
Roy from Space	Héctor López Carmona	Salvador Nájar (voice), Rubén Moya (voice), Patricia Martínez (voice)	Mexico	Animated film
Space Raiders	Howard R. Cohen	Vince Edwards, David Mendenhall, Patsy Pease	United States	
Spacehunter: Adventures in the Forbidden Zone	Lamont Johnson	Peter Strauss, Molly Ringwald, Ernie Hudson, Michael Ironside	United States	
Strange Invaders	Michael Laughlin	Paul Le Mat, Nancy Allen, Diana Scarwid	Canada; United States	
Superman III	Richard Lester	Christopher Reeve, Richard Pryor, Robert Vaughn, Annette O'Toole, Jackie Cooper, Margot Kidder	United States	Superhero film
Urusei Yatsura: Only You	Mamoru Oshii	Fumi Hirano (voice), Toshio Furukawa (voice), Saeko Shimazu (voice)	Japan	First film in the Urusei Yatsura film series
Videodrome	David Cronenberg	James Woods, Sonja Smits, Debbie Harry	Canada	Body horror
WarGames	John Badham	Matthew Broderick, Dabney Coleman, John Wood, Ally Sheedy	United States	Techno-thriller
Warrior of the Lost World	David Worth	Robert Ginty, Persis Khambatta, Donald Pleasence, Fred Williamson	Italy	
Wavelength	Mike Gray	Robert Carradine, Cherie Currie, Keenan Wynn	United States	
Xabungle Graffiti	Yoshiyuki Tomino		Japan	
Xtro	Harry Bromley Davenport	Bernice Stegers, Philip Sayer, Simon Nash, Maryam d'Abo	United Kingdom	Horror
Yor, the Hunter from the Future	Antonio Margheriti	Reb Brown, Corinne Cléry, John Steiner	Italy; France; Turkey	
1984
2010	Peter Hyams	Roy Scheider, John Lithgow, Helen Mirren, Keir Dullea, Douglas Rain	United States	(Note: Won a Hugo Award for Best Dramatic Presentation.)
The Adventures of Buckaroo Banzai Across the 8th Dimension	W. D. Richter	Peter Weller, John Lithgow, Ellen Barkin, Jeff Goldblum, Christopher Lloyd	United States	
Babičky dobíjejte přesně!	Ladislav Rychman	Daniela Kolářová, Jana Dítětová	Czechoslovakia	
Bloodsuckers from Outer Space	Glen Coburn	Thom Meyes, Dennis Letts, Laura Ellis	United States	Horror, Comedy
The Brother from Another Planet	John Sayles	Joe Morton, Darryl Edwards, Steve James	United States	
Delta Space Mission (ro)	Mircea Toia, Călin Cazan	Mirela Gorea-Chelaru (voice), Marcel Iureș (voice), Dan Condurache (voice), Ion Chelaru (voice)	Romania	Animated film. Romanian title: Misiunea spațială Delta
Dreamscape	Joseph Ruben	Dennis Quaid, Max von Sydow, Christopher Plummer, Kate Capshaw, David Patrick Kelly	United States	
Dune	David Lynch	Francesca Annis, Leonardo Cimino, Brad Dourif	United States	Space opera
Electric Dreams	Steve Barron	Lenny Von Dohlen, Virginia Madsen, Bud Cort	United States	
The Ewok Adventure	John Korty	Eric Walker, Warwick Davis, Tony Cox, Fionnula Flanagan	United States	
The Element of Crime	Lars von Trier	Michael Elphick, Esmond Knight, Me Me Lai	Denmark	
Firestarter	Mark L. Lester	Drew Barrymore, David Keith, George C. Scott, Martin Sheen, Heather Locklear	United States	
Ghostbusters	Ivan Reitman	Bill Murray, Dan Aykroyd, Harold Ramis, Sigourney Weaver, Ernie Hudson, Rick Moranis, Annie Potts	United States	Horror, Comedy
Hyperspace; AKA Gremloids	Todd Durham	Robert Bloodwort, Chris Elliott, Paula Poundstone, Alan Marx	United States	Comedy, Parody
I Guerrieri dell'anno 2072	Lucio Fulci	Jared Martin, Fred Williamson, Howard Ross	Italy	
Iceman	Fred Schepisi	Timothy Hutton, Lindsay Crouse, John Lone	United States	
The Ice Pirates	Stewart Raffill	Robert Urich, Mary Crosby, Michael D. Roberts	United States	
Impulse	Graham Baker	Tim Matheson, Meg Tilly, Hume Cronyn	United States	
The Invisible Man	Aleksandr Zakharov	Andrey Kharitonov, Romualdas Ramanauskas, Leonid Kuravlyov	Soviet Union	
The Last Starfighter	Nick Castle	Lance Guest, Catherine Mary Stewart, Robert Preston, Dan O'Herlihy	United States	
Lensman	Yoshiaki Kawajiri	Toshio Furukawa (voice), Mami Koyama (voice), Chikao Ōtsuka (voice), Nachi Nozawa (voice)	Japan	
Macross: Do You Remember Love?	Shoji Kawamori	Mari Iijima (voice), Arihiro Hase (voice), Mika Doi (voice), Michio Hazama (voice)	Japan	
The Meeting	Mikhail Titov		Soviet Union	Animated short film
Nausicaä of the Valley of the Wind	Hayao Miyazaki	Sumi Shimamoto (voice), Mahito Tsujimura (voice), Hisako Kyôda (voice)	Japan	Anime film
The Next One	Nico Mastorakis	Keir Dullea, Adrienne Barbeau, Peter Hobbs	Greece	
Night of the Comet	Thom Eberhardt	Catherine Mary Stewart, Kelli Maroney, Robert Beltran, Mary Woronov, Geoffrey Lewis	United States	
Nineteen Eighty-Four	Michael Radford	John Hurt, Richard Burton, Suzanna Hamilton	United Kingdom	
The Noah's Ark Principle	Roland Emmerich	Richy Müller, Franz Buchrieser	West Germany	
The Philadelphia Experiment	Stewart Raffill	Michael Paré, Nancy Allen, Eric Christmas	United States	
Repo Man	Alex Cox	Harry Dean Stanton, Emilio Estevez, Olivia Barash	United States	Comedy
Return from Orbit	Aleksandr Surin	Juozas Budraitis, Vitaliy Solomin, Aleksandr Porokhovshchikov	Soviet Union	
The Return of Godzilla	Koji Hashimoto (director)	Raymond Burr, Ken Tanaka	Japan; United States	Kaijū
Runaway	Michael Crichton	Tom Selleck, Cynthia Rhodes, Gene Simmons, Kirstie Alley, G. W. Bailey	United States	
Sayonara Jupiter	Koji Hashimoto	Tomokazu Miura, Dangely Diane, Miyuki Ono, Rachel Huggett	Japan	
Sexmission	Juliusz Machulski	Olgierd Łukaszewicz, Jerzy Stuhr, Hanna Stankówna	Poland	
Star Trek III: The Search for Spock	Leonard Nimoy	William Shatner, Leonard Nimoy, DeForest Kelley, James Doohan, Nichelle Nichols, Christopher Lloyd	United States	
Starman	John Carpenter	Jeff Bridges, Karen Allen, Charles Martin Smith	United States	
The Terminator	James Cameron	Arnold Schwarzenegger, Michael Biehn, Linda Hamilton	United States	Time travel film (Note: Winner of a Saturn Award for Best Science Fiction Film.)
There Will Come Soft Rains (ru)	Nozim To'laxo'jayev		Soviet Union	Animated short film. Russian title: Будет ласковый дождь, tr. Budet laskovyy dozhd'
The Toxic Avenger	Lloyd Kaufman, Michael Herz	Mitch Cohen, Mark Torgl, Andree Maranda	United States	Science fiction action superhero
Urusei Yatsura 2: Beautiful Dreamer	Mamoru Oshii	Fumi Hirano (voice), Toshio Furukawa (voice), Akira Kamiya (voice)	Japan	Second film in the Urusei Yatsura film series
Urutoraman Zofuii	Koichi Takano	Ichirô Furutachi, Ken'yû Horiuchi, Yôko Kuri, Sumiko Shirakawa	Japan	Superhero
1985
Back to the Future	Robert Zemeckis	Michael J. Fox, Christopher Lloyd, Crispin Glover, Lea Thompson, Thomas F. Wilson	United States	Time travel film (Note: Won an Academy Award for Sound Editing, a Saturn Award for Best Science Fiction Film and a Hugo Award for Best Dramatic Presentation. Highest-grossing film of the year.)
Brazil	Terry Gilliam	Jonathan Pryce, Michael Palin, Kim Greist, Robert De Niro	United Kingdom	(Note: Winner of BAFTA Awards for Best Production Design and Best Special Visual Effects. Won a BSFA Award for media presentation.)
City Limits	Aaron Lipstadt	Darrell Larson, John Stockwell, Kim Cattrall	United States	
Cocoon	Ron Howard	Don Ameche, Wilford Brimley, Hume Cronyn, Brian Dennehy, Steve Guttenberg, Maureen Stapleton, Jessica Tandy	United States	
Contract	Vladimir Tarasov	Aleksandr Kaydanovskiy (voice), Yevgeniy Steblov (voice), Boris Ivanov (voice)	Soviet Union	Animated short film
Creature	William Malone	Stan Ivar, Wendy Schaal, Lyman Ward, Robert Jaffe, Diane Salinger	United States	
D.A.R.Y.L.	Simon Wincer	Barret Oliver, Mary Beth Hurt, Michael McKean, Kathryn Walker	United States	
The Dungeonmaster	Dave Allen, Charles Band	Jeffrey Byron, Leslie Wing, Richard Moll	United States	
Day of the Dead	George A. Romero	Lori Cardille, Joseph Pilato, Richard Liberty, Sherman Howard	United States	
Enemy Mine	Wolfgang Petersen	Dennis Quaid, Louis Gossett Jr., Brion James	United States	
Explorers	Joe Dante	Ethan Hawke, River Phoenix, Jason Presson	United States	
Galaxy Invader	Don Dohler	Richard Ruxton, George Stover, Faye Tilles, Glenn Barnes	United States	
Gwen, or the Book of Sand	Jean-François Laguionie	Michel Robin (voice), Lorella Di Cicco (voice)	France	Animated film
Lifeforce	Tobe Hooper	Steve Railsback, Peter Firth, Frank Finlay	United Kingdom; United States	
Mad Max Beyond Thunderdome	George Ogilvie, George Miller	Mel Gibson, Tina Turner	Australia	Post-apocalyptic
Morons from Outer Space	Mike Hodges	Mel Smith, Griff Rhys Jones, Paul Brown	United Kingdom	
My Science Project	Jonathan Betuel	John Stockwell, Fisher Stevens, Raphael Sbarge	United States	
O-Bi, O-Ba: The End of Civilization	Piotr Szulkin	Jerzy Stuhr, Krystyna Janda, Kalina Jędrusik	Poland	
Odin: Photon Sailer Starlight	Toshio Masuda		Japan	
Planet 888	Vladimir Mailyan		Soviet Union	Animated short film. Russian title: Планета 888, tr. Planeta 888. Armenian title: Մոլորակ 888
The Quiet Earth	Geoff Murphy	Bruno Lawrence, Alison Routledge	New Zealand	
Radioactive Dreams	Albert Pyun	Michael Dudikoff, Lisa Blount, Don Murray	United States	
Real Genius	Martha Coolidge	Val Kilmer, Gabriel Jarret, Michelle Meyrink, William Atherton	United States	
Re-Animator	Stuart Gordon	Jeffrey Combs, Bruce Abbott, Barbara Crampton	United States	Horror, Comedy
The Return of the Living Dead	Dan O'Bannon	Clu Gulager, James Karen, Don Calfa	United States	Science fiction horror comedy
Space Rage	Conrad E. Palmisano	Richard Farnsworth, Michael Paré, John Laughlin	United States	
Starchaser: The Legend of Orin	Steven Hahn	Joe Colligan (voice), Anthony De Longis (voice), Carmen Argenziano (voice)	United States	Animated film
The Stuff	Larry Cohen	Michael Moriarty, Andrea Marcovicci, Garrett Morris, Paul Sorvino	United States	
Trancers	Charles Band	Tim Thomerson, Helen Hunt	United States	
Underworld	George Pavlou	Denholm Elliott, Miranda Richardson, Steven Berkoff	UK	Sci-fi horror
Urusei Yatsura 3: Remember My Love	Kazuo Yamazaki	Fumi Hirano (voice), Toshio Furukawa (voice), Akira Kamiya (voice)	Japan	Third film in the Urusei Yatsura film series
Visit with Van Gogh	Horst Seemann	Grażyna Szapołowska, Christian Grashof, Rolf Hoppe	East Germany; West Germany	German title: Besuch bei Van Gogh
Weird Science	John Hughes	Anthony Michael Hall, Kelly Le Brock, Ilan Mitchell-Smith, Bill Paxton	United States	
1986
Aliens	James Cameron	Sigourney Weaver, Paul Reiser, Michael Biehn, Bill Paxton	United States	(Note: Won an Academy Award for Visual Effects and Sound Editing, a Saturn Award for Best Science Fiction Film, a BSFA Award for media presentation and a Hugo Award for Best Dramatic Presentation.) Action
Armadillo Blood	Marcos Bertoni	Flora Calviño, Henrique Zanetta, Louis Chilson	Brazil	Super 8 eco-dystopian short film. Portuguese title: Sangue de Tatu
The Aurora Encounter	Jim McCullough, Sr.	Jack Elam, Peter Brown, Carol Bagdasarian	United States	
The Battle	Mikhail Titov		Soviet Union	Animated short film. Russian title: Сражение, tr. Srazheniye
Battle for the Lost Planet	Brett Piper	Matt Mitler, Denise Coward, Joe Gentissi	United States	
Biggles a.k.a Biggles: Adventures in Time	John Hough	Neil Dickson, Alex Hyde-White, Fiona Hutchison, Peter Cushing, Marcus Gilbert, William Hootkins	United Kingdom	Time travel film
Choke Canyon	Charles Bail	Stephen Collins, Janet Julian, Bo Svenson, Lance Henriksen	United States	
Chopping Mall	Jim Wynorski	Kelli Maroney, Tony O'Dell, Russell Todd	United States	
Critters	Stephen Herek	Dee Wallace, M. Emmet Walsh, Billy Green Bush	United States	Horror, Comedy
Dead End Drive-In	Brian Trenchard-Smith	Ned Manning, Natalie McCurry, Peter Whitford	Australia	
Dead Man's Letters	Konstantin Lopushansky	Rolan Bykov, Iosif Ryklin	Soviet Union	antiutopia, post-apocalyptic film, psychological drama
Death Powder	Shigeru Izumiya	Shigeru Izumiya, Rikako Murakami, Takichi Inukai	Japan	
Deadly Friend	Wes Craven	Matthew Laborteaux, Kristy Swanson, Michael Sharrett	United States	
Dirty Pair: Project Eden	Kōichi Mashimo	Saeko Shimazu (voice), Kyōko Tongū (voice), Katsuji Mori (voice)	Japan	
Eliminators	Peter Manoogian	Andrew Prine, Denise Crosby, Patrick Reynolds	United States	
Fist of the North Star	Toyoo Ashida	Akira Kamiya (voice), Yuriko Yamamoto (voice), Kenji Utsumi (voice)	Japan	Anime film
Flight of the Navigator	Randal Kleiser	Joey Cramer, Veronica Cartwright, Cliff DeYoung, Sarah Jessica Parker	United States	
The Fly	David Cronenberg	Jeff Goldblum, Geena Davis, John Getz	United States; Canada	(Note: Winner of an Academy Award for Makeup.)
From Beyond	Stuart Gordon	Jeffrey Combs, Barbara Crampton, Ken Foree	United States	Science fiction horror
Ga, Ga - Chwala bohaterom	Peter Szulkin	Katarzyna Figura, Daniel Olbrychski, Marek Walczewski, Jan Nowicki	Poland	
Gröna gubbar från Y.R.	Hans Hatwig	Carl Billquist, Curt Broberg, Åsa Dahlenborg	Sweden	(Note: Alternate title: Green Men From Outer Space)
Howard the Duck	Willard Huyck	Lea Thompson, Jeffrey Jones, Tim Robbins	United States	(Note: Received Razzie Awards for Worst Picture (tie), Worst Screenplay, Worst New Star and Worst Visual Effects.)
Invaders from Mars	Tobe Hooper	Karen Black, Hunter Carson, Timothy Bottoms, Louise Fletcher	United States	
Kamikaze	Didier Grousset	Richard Bohringer, Dominique Lavanant, Michel Galabru	France	
Kin-dza-dza!	Georgi Daneliya	Stanislav Lyubshin, Yevgeni Leonov, Yury Yakovlev	Soviet Union	
Little Shop of Horrors	Frank Oz	Rick Moranis, Ellen Greene, Vincent Gardenia, Steve Martin, Levi Stubbs (voice)	United States	Musical comedy horror
Maximum Overdrive	Stephen King	Emilio Estevez, Pat Hingle, Laura Harrington	United States	
M.D. Geist	Hayato Ikeda	Norio Wakamoto, Rika Matsumoto, Akio Nojima	Japan	Animated film
Night of the Creeps	Fred Dekker	Jason Lively, Steve Marshall, Jill Whitlow	United States	
Programmed to Kill	Allan Holzman	Robert Ginty, Sandahl Bergman, Louise Claire Clark, Alex Courtney	United States	
Project A-ko	Katsuhiko Nishijima		Japan	
SpaceCamp	Harry Winer	Clifford Green, Casey T. Mitchell	United States	
Short Circuit	John Badham	Ally Sheedy, Steve Guttenberg, Fisher Stevens	United States	
Star Crystal	Lance Lindsay	C. Juston Campbell, Faye Bolt, John W. Smith	United States	
Star Trek IV: The Voyage Home	Leonard Nimoy	William Shatner, Leonard Nimoy, DeForest Kelley, James Doohan, Nichelle Nichols, Catherine Hicks	United States	
TerrorVision	Ted Nicolaou	Diane Franklin, Gerrit Graham, Mary Woronov	United States	Horror
They Were Eleven	Satoshi Dezaki		Japan	
The Transformers: The Movie	Nelson Shin	Leonard Nimoy (voice), Robert Stack (voice), Judd Nelson (voice), Orson Welles (voice), Peter Cullen (voice), Frank Welker (voice)	United States	Animated film
Urusei Yatsura 4: Lum the Forever	Kazuo Yamazaki	Fumi Hirano (voice), Toshio Furukawa (voice), Akira Kamiya (voice)	Japan	Fourth film in the Urusei Yatsura film series
Vendetta dal futuro	Sergio Martino	Daniel Greene, Janet Agren, John Saxon	Italy	
The Wraith	Mike Marvin	Charlie Sheen, Nick Cassavetes, Randy Quaid	United States	
Zone Troopers	Danny Bilson	Tim Thomerson, Tim Van Patten	United States	
1987
Amazon Women on the Moon	John Landis	Arsenio Hall, Michelle Pfeiffer, Steve Guttenberg	United States	
Bad Taste	Peter Jackson	Peter Jackson, Mike Minett, Pete O'Herne	New Zealand	Horror, Comedy
Batteries Not Included	Matthew Robbins	Hume Cronyn, Jessica Tandy, Frank McRae	United States	
Creepozoids	David DeCoteau	Linnea Quigley, Ashlyn Gere	United States	
Cyclops	Jôji Iida	Kai Atō, Yoshimasa Kondo, Kazuhiro Sano	Japan	
The Curse	David Chaskin, David Keith	Wil Wheaton, Claude Akins, Malcolm Danare	United States	
Death Run	Michael J. Murphy	Rob Bartlett, Lynn Lowry	United States	
Direct Hit	Vladimir Morozov		Soviet Union	Animated short film. Russian title: Прямое попадание, tr. Pryamoye popadaniye
The Dolphin's Cry	Aleksey Saltykov	Ivars Kalniņš, Donatas Banionis, Armen Dzhigarkhanyan	Soviet Union	
The End of Eternity	Andrey Yermash	Oleg Vavilov, Gediminas Girdvainis, Georgiy Zhzhonov	Soviet Union	
Friendship's Death	Peter Wollen	Tilda Swinton, Patrick Bauchau, Bill Paterson	United Kingdom	
The Hidden	Jack Sholder	Kyle MacLachlan, Michael Nouri, Claudia Christian	United States	
Innerspace	Joe Dante	Dennis Quaid, Martin Short, Meg Ryan	United States	(Note: Won an Academy Award for Best Visual Effects.)
The Kindred	Stephen Carpenter, Jeffrey Obrow	David Allen Brooks, Rod Steiger, Amanda Pays	United States	
The Lesson	Robert Sahakyants		Soviet Union	Animated short film
Making Mr. Right	Susan Seidelman	John Malkovich, Ann Magnuson, Glenne Headly	United States	
Masters of the Universe	Gary Goddard	Dolph Lundgren, Frank Langella, Meg Foster	United States	
Mr. India	Shekhar Kapur	Anil Kapoor, Sri Devi, Satish Kaushik, Amrish Puri, Annu Kapoor	India	
Nightflyers	Robert Collector, Gene Warren	Catherine Mary Stewart, John Standing, Michael Praed, Lisa Blount	United States	
Predator	John McTiernan	Arnold Schwarzenegger, Carl Weathers, Elpidia Carrillo	United States	Action
Prison Ship	Fred Olen Ray	Ross Hagen, Sandy Brooke, Susan Stokey, John Carradine	United States	(Note: Also known as Star Slammer, the Escape.)
Project X	Jonathan Kaplan	Matthew Broderick, Helen Hunt, William Sadler	United States	
RoboCop	Paul Verhoeven	Peter Weller, Nancy Allen, Ronny Cox, Kurtwood Smith, Dan O'Herlihy	United States	Action (Note: Winner of an Academy Special Achievement Award for Sound Effects Editing and a Saturn Award for Best Science Fiction Film.)
Royal Space Force: The Wings of Honnêamise	Hiroyuki Yamaga		Japan	
The Running Man	Paul Michael Glaser	Arnold Schwarzenegger, María Conchita Alonso, Yaphet Kotto, Richard Dawson	United States	
Spaceballs	Mel Brooks	Mel Brooks, Bill Pullman, John Candy, Rick Moranis, Daphne Zuniga	United States	
Slave Girls from Beyond Infinity	Ken Dixon	Elizabeth Kaitan, Cindy Beal, Brinke Stevens	United States	
Steel Dawn	Lance Hool	Patrick Swayze, Lisa Niemi, Brion James	United States	
The Stepford Children	Alan J. Levi	Barbara Eden, Don Murray, Randall Batinkoff, Tammy Lauren	United States	
Timestalkers	Michael Schultz	William Devane, Lauren Hutton, Forrest Tucker, James Avery, John Ratzenberger	United States	
Superman IV: The Quest for Peace	Sidney J. Furie	Christopher Reeve, Gene Hackman, Jackie Cooper, Margot Kidder, Mariel Hemingway, Jon Cryer, Sam Wanamaker	United States	
The Veldt	Nozim To'laxo'jayev	Yuriy Belyayev, Nelli Pshyonnaya, Giorgi Gegechkori	Soviet Union	Dystopian
1988
The 13th Apostle	Suren Babayan	Juozas Budraitis, Andrey Boltnev, Vladas Bagdonas	Soviet Union	
Akira	Katsuhiro Ōtomo	Mitsuo Iwata (voice), Nozomu Sasaki (voice), Mami Koyama (voice)	Japan	Anime film
Alien from L.A.	Albert Pyun	Kathy Ireland, Thom Mathews, Don Michael Paul	United States	
Alien Nation	Graham Baker	James Caan, Mandy Patinkin, Terence Stamp	United States	(Note: Won a Saturn Award for Best Science Fiction Film.)
Andy Colby's Incredible Adventure	Deborah Brock	Randy Josselyn, Dianne Kay, Chuck Kovacic	United States	
As Time Goes By	Barry Peak	Max Gillies, Bruno Lawrence, Nique Needles	Australia	Comedy
The Blob	Chuck Russell	Kevin Dillon, Shawnee Smith, Donovan Leitch	United States	Horror, Remake
The Brain	Edward Hunt	Tom Bresnahan, Cynthia Preston, David Gale	Canada	Horror
Cherry 2000	Steve De Jarnatt	Melanie Griffith, David Andrews, Tim Thomerson, Pamela Gidley	United States	
Critters 2: The Main Course	Mick Garris	Scott Grimes, Liane Alexandra Curtis, Don Opper	United States	
Dead Heat	Mark Goldblatt	Treat Williams, Joe Piscopo, Vincent Price	United States	Sci-fi horror
Earth Girls Are Easy	Julien Temple	Geena Davis, Jeff Goldblum, Julie Brown, Jim Carrey, Damon Wayans, Michael McKean, Charles Rocket	United States; United Kingdom	
Gandahar	René Laloux		France	Animated film
Hell Comes to Frogtown	Donald G. Jackson, R. J. Kizer	Roddy Piper, Sandahl Bergman, Cec Verrell, William Smith, Rory Calhoun	United States	
Killer Klowns from Outer Space	Stephen Chiodo	Grant Cramer, Suzanne Snyder, John Allen Nelson	United States	Horror, Comedy
The Lawless Land	Jon Hess	Nick Corri, Leon Robinson, Xander Berkeley, Amanda Peterson	United States	
Legend of the Galactic Heroes: My Conquest is the Sea of Stars	Noboru Ishiguro	Ryō Horikawa (voice), Kei Tomiyama (voice)	Japan	
Lilac Ball	Pavel Arsenov	Natalya Guseva, Sasha Gusev, Boris Shcherbakov	Soviet Union	Children's film
Mac and Me	Stewart Ratfill	Christine Ebersole, Tina Caspary, Jonathan Ward	United States	(Note: Winner of 1988 Raspberry awards for Worst New Star and Worst Director. Nominated for Worst Picture and Worst Screenplay.)
Midnight Movie Massacre	Mark Stock, Larry Jacobs	Robert Clarke, Anne Robinson, David Staffer, Tom Hutsler	United States	
Miracle Mile	Steve De Jarnatt	Anthony Edwards, Mare Winningham, John Agar	United States	
Mirai Ninja	Keita Amemiya	Hanbei Kawai, Hiroki Ida, Eri Morishita	Japan	Action
Mobile Suit Gundam: Char's Counterattack	Yoshiyuki Tomino		Japan	
Moonwalker	Jerry Kramer, Colin Chilvers	Michael Jackson, Joe Pesci, Sean Lennon	United States	The Smooth Criminal segment is a noir/sci-fi film
My Stepmother Is an Alien	Richard Benjamin	Kim Basinger, Dan Aykroyd, Alyson Hannigan, Jon Lovitz	United States	
The Nest	Terence H. Winkless	Robert Lansing, Lisa Langlois	United States	
Not of This Earth	Jim Wynorski	Traci Lords, Arthur Roberts	United States	
On the Silver Globe	Andrzej Zulawski	Andrzej Seweryn, Grazyna Dylag, Jerzy Trela	Poland	Art film
The Pass	Vladimir Tarasov	Aleksandr Kaydanovskiy (voice), Vasiliy Livanov (voice), Aleksandr Pashutin (voice)	Soviet Union	Animated short film
Pulse	Paul Golding	Cliff DeYoung, Roxanne Hart, Joey Lawrence	United States	
Robowar	Bruno Mattei	Reb Brown, Catherine Hickland, Massimo Vanni	Italy	
Short Circuit 2	Kenneth Johnson	Fisher Stevens, Michael McKean, Cynthia Gibb	United States	
The Son of the Stars	Mircea Toia, Călin Cazan, Dan Chisovsky	Mihai Cafrița (voice), Ion Caramitru (voice), Virgil Ogășanu (voice), Mircea Albulescu (voice), Mirela Gorea-Chelaru (voice)	Romania	Animated film
Space Mutiny	David Winters, Neal Sundstrom	Reb Brown, Cameron Mitchell, Cisse Cameron	South Africa	Science fiction action
They Live	John Carpenter	Roddy Piper, Keith David, Meg Foster	United States	Action
Transformations	Jay Kamen	Rex Smith, Lisa Langlois, Patrick Macnee	United States	
Urusei Yatsura: The Final Chapter	Satoshi Dezaki	Fumi Hirano (voice), Toshio Furukawa (voice), Akira Kamiya (voice)	Japan	Fifth film in the Urusei Yatsura film series
Warlords	Fred Olen Ray, Sid Haig	David Carradine, Dawn Wildsmith, Sid Haig	United States	
Wind (ru)	Robert Sahakyants		Soviet Union	Animated short film. Russian title: Ветер, tr. Veter. Armenian title: Քամի
World Gone Wild	Lee H. Katzin	Bruce Dern, Michael Paré, Catherine Mary Stewart	United States	
1989
Alienator	Fred Olen Ray	Jan-Michael Vincent, John Phillip Law, Ross Hagen	United States	
Alien Seed	Bob James	Erik Estrada	United States	
Arena	Peter Manoogian	Claudia Christian, Marc Alaimo	Italy	
The Abyss	James Cameron	Ed Harris, Mary Elizabeth Mastrantonio, Michael Biehn	United States	(Note: Winner of an Academy Award for Best Visual Effects.)
Back to the Future Part II	Robert Zemeckis	Michael J. Fox, Christopher Lloyd, Lea Thompson, Thomas F. Wilson	United States	Time travel film
Bill & Ted's Excellent Adventure	Stephen Herek	Keanu Reeves, Alex Winter, George Carlin	United States	Comedy, time travel film
The Blood of Heroes	David Webb Peoples	Rutger Hauer, Joan Chen, Delroy Lindo	Australia; United States	
Bunker Palace Hôtel	Enki Bilal	Jean-Louis Trintignant, Carole Bouquet, Benoît Régent	France	
Communion	Philippe Mora	Christopher Walken, Lindsay Crouse, Frances Sternhagen	United States	
Cyborg	Albert Pyun	Jean-Claude Van Damme, Deborah Richter	United States	
Deceit	Albert Pyun	Sam Phillips, Norbert Weisser, Scott Paulin	United States	
DeepStar Six	Sean S. Cunningham	Taurean Blacque, Nancy Everhard	United States	
The Evil Below	Wayne Crawford	Wayne Crawford, June Chadwick, Paul Siebert	United States	
The Five Star Stories	Kazuo Yamazaki		Japan	
Future Force	David A. Prior	David Carradine, Anna Rapagna, Robert Tessier	United States	Action
Ghostbusters II	Ivan Reitman	Bill Murray, Dan Aykroyd, Harold Ramis, Sigourney Weaver, Ernie Hudson, Rick Moranis, Annie Potts, Peter MacNicol	United States	Horror, Comedy
Godzilla vs. Biollante	Kazuki Ōmori	Megumi Odaka, Yasuka Sawaguchi	Japan	Kaijū
Gunhed	Masato Harada	Masahiro Takashima, Brenda Bakke	Japan	
Hard to Be a God	Peter Fleischmann	Edward Zentara, Aleksandr Filippenko, Hugues Quester, Anne Gautier	West Germany; Soviet Union; France; Switzerland	
Honey, I Shrunk the Kids	Joe Johnston	Rick Moranis, Matt Frewer, Marcia Strassman	United States	
Jetsons: The Movie	Joseph Barbera, William Hanna	George O'Hanlon (voice), Mel Blanc (voice), Penny Singleton (voice)	United States	Animated film
Journey to the Center of the Earth	Albert Pyun	Kathy Ireland	United States	
Leviathan	George Pan Cosmatos	Peter Weller, Richard Crenna, Amanda Pays, Daniel Stern	Italy; United States	
Lords of the Deep	Mary Ann Fisher	Bradford Dillman, Priscilla Barnes, Melody Ryane	United States	
Meet the Hollowheads	Thomas R. Burman	John Glover, Richard Portnow, Juliette Lewis	United States	
Millennium	Michael Anderson	Kris Kristofferson, Cheryl Ladd, Daniel J. Travanti, Robert Joy	United States	
Moontrap	Robert Dyke	Walter Koenig, Bruce Campbell, Leigh Lombardi	United States	
Mutant on the Bounty	Robert Torrance	Kyle T. Heffner, Scott Williamson, John Durbin	United States	
My 20th Century	Ildikó Enyedi	Dorota Segda, Oleg Yankovskiy, Paulus Manker	Hungary; West Germany; Cuba	Comedy-drama
Patlabor: The Movie	Mamoru Oshii		Japan	
The Return of Swamp Thing	Jim Wynorski	Louis Jourdan, Heather Locklear, Sarah Douglas	United States	
Slipstream	Steven Lisberger	Mark Hamill, Bob Peck, Bill Paxton, Ben Kingsley, F. Murray Abraham	United Kingdom; United States	
Spontaneous Combustion	Tobe Hooper	Brad Dourif	United States	
Star Trek V: The Final Frontier	William Shatner	William Shatner, Leonard Nimoy, DeForest Kelley, James Doohan, Nichelle Nichols	United States	(Note: Received Razzie Awards for Worst Picture, Worst Actor and Worst Director.)
The Terror Within	Thierry Notz	George Kennedy, Andrew Stevens, Starr Andreeff	United States	Horror
Tetsuo: The Iron Man	Shinya Tsukamoto	Tomoroh Taguchi, Kei Fujiwara, Shinya Tsukamoto	Japan	Horror, Comedy
UFO Abduction	Dean Alioto		United States	Horror, found footage
Venus Wars	Yoshikazu Yasuhiko		Japan	
A Visitor to a Museum	Konstantin Lopushansky	Viktor Mikhaylov, Vera Mayorova, Vadim Lobanov, Irina Rakshina	Soviet Union; Switzerland; West Germany	

== See also ==
- History of science fiction films
