= Ga-ga: Glory To The Heroes =

- Directed by: Piotr Szulkin
- Written by: Piotr Szulkin
- Produced by: Dorota Ostrowska-Orlińska
- Starring: Daniel Olbrychski Katarzyna Figura Jerzy Stuhr
- Cinematography: Edward Kłosiński
- Edited by: Elzbieta Kurkowska
- Music by: Zbigniew Górny
- Production company: Studio Filmowe Perspektywa
- Distributed by: Przedsiębiorstwo Dystrybucji Filmów
- Release date: 26 September 1986
- Running time: 84 minutes
- Country: Poland
- Language: Polish

Ga-ga: Glory To The Heroes (Polish: Ga, ga: Chwała bohaterom) is a 1986 Polish science fiction dystopian film directed by Piotr Szulkin. The film was based on the novel Kryptonym Psima (1982) by Mirosław P. Jabłoński and the "La Ricotta" segment in film Ro.Go.Pa.G (1963) by Pier Paol Pasolini. It is the last part of the director's thematic apocalypse tetralogy, which consists of Golem, The War of the Worlds: Next Century and O-bi, O-ba:The End of Civilization.

The film follows a convict condemned to explore and conquer an earth colony where, upon his arrival he is declared a "hero".

== Plot ==
In the 21st century, humanity has colonized neighboring planets. Technological progress has significantly eliminated the need for people to perform work, which made it possible to give the difficult and dangerous profession of space exploration to prison inmates, Scope is one such inmate.

During his mission, Scope reaches the planet Australia-458, where he meets a novice prostitute named Once. Soon after his arrival, Once disappears and he is accused by the local police, first of murder and then of raping a minor. The aim of these actions is to organize a spectacular execution of a criminal, a televised impalement, in the presence of crowds in the stadium. He is informed about this by Chudy, a journalist who wants to cover his impalement for his show. Scope is arrested but escapes to continue searching for Once. Since he is supposed to commit a crime, he robs a bank so he has the money to buy Once's freedom from her pimp, Al. The exchange happens without a problem and they both happily reach the space vehicle and fly away in search of a deserted planet.

== Cast ==
- Daniel Olbrychski as Scope
- Catherine Figura as Once
- Jerzy Stuhr as Chudy
- Leon Niemczyk as showman
- Jan Nowicki as Al, Once's pimp
- Włodzimierz Musiał as the second hero
- Mariusz Benoit as the owner of the house for the heroes
- Bożena Dykiel as the owner of the house for the heroes
- Maria Ciunelis as daughter of homeowners for heroes
- Jerzy Trela as Prison Director
- Henry Bista as pastor
- Bronisław Wrocławski as prison guard #1
- Jacek Strzemżalski as prison guard #2
- Krzysztof Chojnacki as prison guard #3

== Production ==
The film was produced by the Studio Filmowe Perspektywa. The cinematography was done by Edward Kłosiński, while the music was composed by Zbigniew Górny.The set was designed by Halina Dobrowolska. The principal photography was done in Warsaw.

== Reception ==
Krzysztof Loska wrote that compared to the previous parts of the tetralogy, "the exaggeration typical of grotesque representation is much deeper here [...], verging on self-parody". Jakub Sebastian Konefał considered it "an adequate attempt to mock the ubiquitous poetics of the American wave of comic book superproductions," as evidenced by the character of Scope, who is the most devoid of any qualities or character traits. Konefał noted that it was Ga-ga of all the works of the Szulkin tetralogy “It is the film that most appeals to the younger generation of viewers”.

The film was watched by almost 415 thousand people.

== See also ==
- Polish speculative fiction
- On the Silver Globe (film)
- Sexmission
