= Paula Sheppard =

American actress

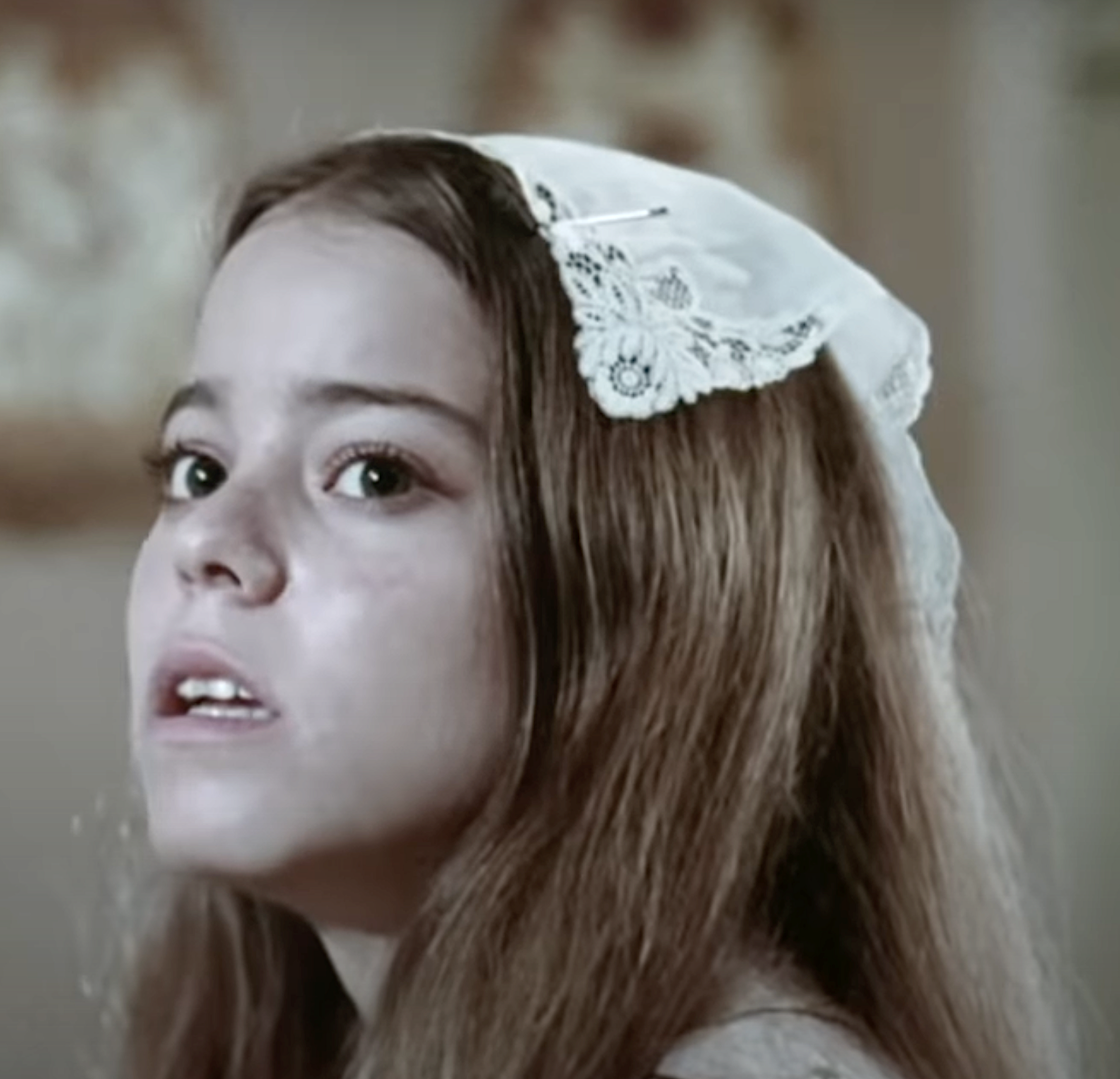
- Sheppard in Alice, Sweet Alice (1976)
- Born: July 7, 1957 (age 69); West Orange, New Jersey, U.S.
- Occupation: Actress
- Years active: 1976–1982
- Notable work: Alice, Sweet Alice (1976); Liquid Sky (1982)

Paula Sheppard (born July 7, 1957) is an American former actress known for her lead roles in the horror film Alice, Sweet Alice (1976), and the science fiction film Liquid Sky (1982). Though she only starred in two theatrically released feature films, both attracted cult followings and garnered her a fanbase among underground film fans.

A native of New Jersey, Sheppard was cast by director Alfred Sole in the lead role in Alice, Sweet Alice, and received critical praise for her performance as a disturbed adolescent suspected of her sister's murder. Based on her performance in this film, director Slava Tsukerman cast her as a lead in Liquid Sky, for which she attracted further notice. Despite receiving praise for both films, Sheppard abandoned her acting career after filming Tam Lin (1982), an adaptation of the Scottish folktale of the same name which was never released to the public. Sometime in the 1980s, she relocated to the Pacific Northwest of the United States, where she started a family and has since remained out of the public eye.

Marc Edward Heuck described Sheppard as a "defiant performer" who "gave unforgettable performances in two of the most striking and still vigorously discussed films of their respective decades."

== Early life ==
Paula Sheppard was born July 7, 1957, in West Orange, New Jersey. Her mother was an attorney, and her father worked in the field of biochemistry. After high school, she attended HB Studio and New York University, where she studied dance.

== Career ==
=== Alice, Sweet Alice ===
In 1975, Sheppard was approached by director Alfred Sole after he spotted her performing as a dancer in a stage production at Connecticut College. Sole presented Sheppard with the screenplay for his horror film Alice, Sweet Alice after the performance, asking her to star in the titular role of Alice Spages, a 12-year-old girl suspected of her younger sister's (Brooke Shields) violent murder during her First Communion. "This really strange guy came up to me at lunchtime and said he wanted to put me into movies. I didn’t know what to do. Several other guys had approached me [before] with the same line, and they were obviously creeps," Sheppard recalled. "Alfred seemed kind and honest though, so I talked to him about it."

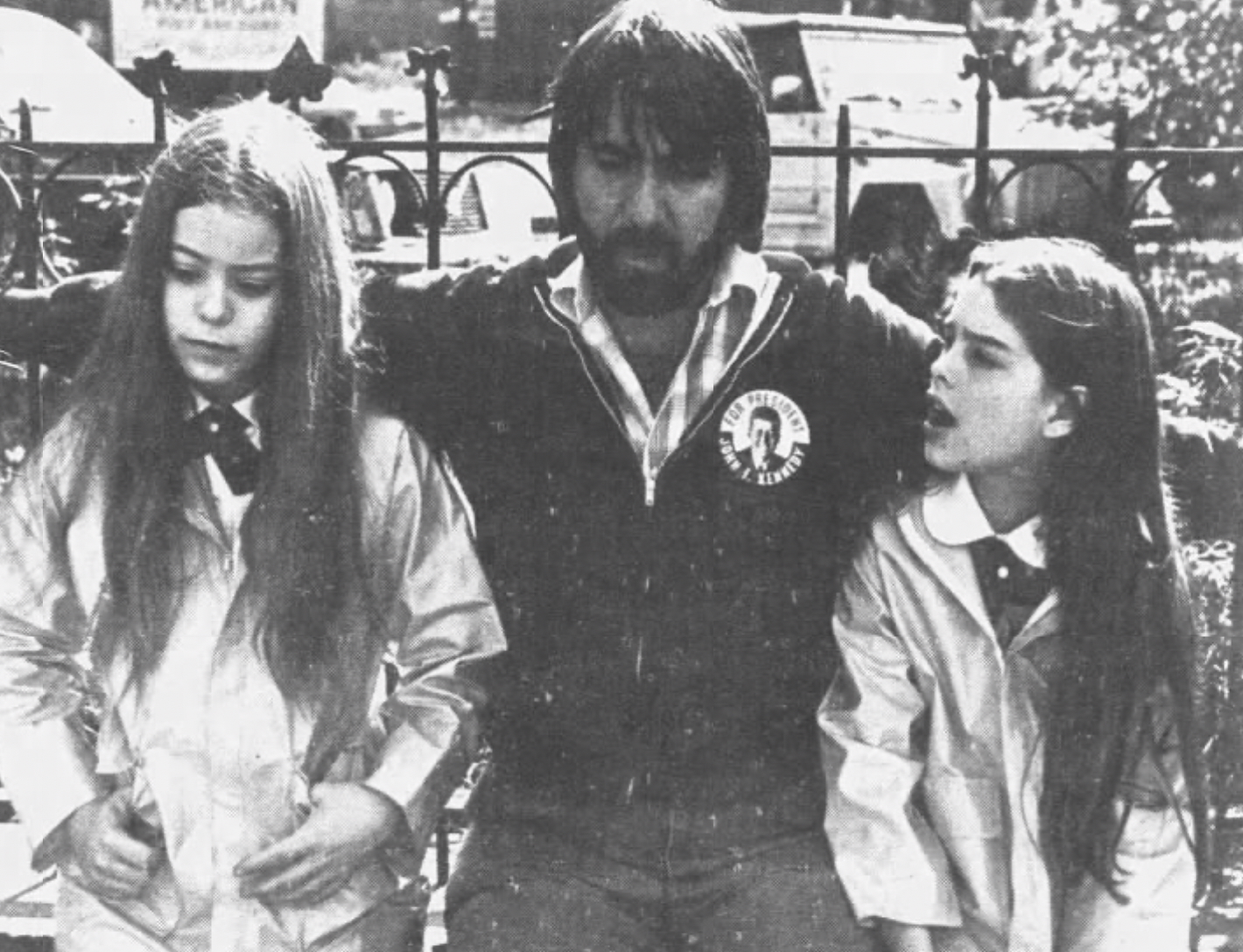
Sheppard with Alfred Sole and Brooke Shields on the set of Alice, Sweet Alice, 1975

Due to Sheppard's diminutive stature, Sole felt she would be able to effectively portray an adolescent. "When I saw her, I thought she was fabulous," Sole recalled. "She looked old, she looked young, she looked mean, she looked happy... You know what I mean? She had a great face." Sheppard, who had never acted professionally and had never sought a career as an actress, ultimately accepted the role. She later stated that she found portraying the disturbed Alice challenging, describing herself as a "soft-spoken, mild-mannered girl... It was difficult to be so vicious." Sheppard celebrated her nineteenth birthday while making the film.

Alice, Sweet Alice was originally released under the title Communion in November 1976, before being more widely distributed under the former title in 1977. While the film received criticism due to its controversial portrayal of Catholicism and violence, Sheppard received critical praise for her lead performance in the film. While objecting to the film's violent content, Linda Gross of the Los Angeles Times praised Sheppard's portrayal as "excellent," while Derek Malcolm of The Guardian noted that her performance is "consistently convincing," and Rita Rose of The Indianapolis Star noted her performance as "especially good." In the years following its release, Alice, Sweet Alice developed a reputation as a cult film. Following Alice, Sweet Alice, Sheppard relocated to the western United States to attend college.

=== Liquid Sky ===
Director Slava Tsukerman subsequently sought out Sheppard to star in his science fiction film Sweet Sixteen, after having been impressed by her debut performance. The project was ultimately never made due to its investors abandoning it, after which Tsukerman offered Sheppard a lead role opposite Anne Carlisle in his followup project, Liquid Sky (1982). She was cast in the film as Adrian, a performance artist and amoral drug dealer in a Manhattan apartment building that is overtaken by extraterrestrials whose UFO lands on the roof. Carlisle, commenting on Sheppard's performance, said: "[Paula] is nothing like that. Slava and I coached her to teach her the character, the mentality of the character. There was a person we had in mind to play that role but when we had her read the role she said, ‘Oh that person is so evil, I could never play this character!’ So really Paula Sheppard was the best actress, she’s professional, she made the character and did the role, but is nothing like her."

Sheppard performs a musical number in the film, "Me and My Rhythm Box", which became frequently sampled by disc jockeys following its release. She received critical praise for her performance in the film, with Stephen Hunter of The Baltimore Sun writing: "The star that emerges from Liquid Sky may be Paula E. Sheppard as Adrian. Small and cute—she looks a little like Pat Benatar—and wired for action, Sheppard's Adrian is electric." Steve Carr of The Daily Tar Heel wrote that Sheppard is "moving... She keeps the sentimentality to a minimum, bringing out both the cruel and childlike qualities of her character."

Sheppard's performance in Liquid Sky attracted notice from several Hollywood producers, whom Tsukerman said all had "[fallen] in love with Paula and wanted her as an actress." However, Sheppard chose not to further pursue a career: "She never did it. She’s very emotional," said Tsukerman.

=== Retirement ===
Sheppard's final acting role was in a low-budget short film adaptation of the Scottish folktale Tam Lin, made in 1982 by director Michael Korolenko but never distributed.

After abandoning her film career, Sheppard relocated to the Pacific Northwest of the United States, and started a family. Commenting on Sheppard's brief career, Marc Edward Heuck wrote in a retrospective for the New Beverly Cinema:

On the one hand, for everyone who has been impressed by her two knockout screen appearances, it can be frustrating that there could not be more opportunities for a gifted natural as herself, and that fan appreciation cannot be directly conveyed to her, or known to be received, or even wanted. But on the other hand, there is a fair comfort in knowing that a woman who is remembered as portraying, respectively, a disrespected child prone to lashing out and an addictive personality who praises yet fears being alone, has found serenity among a trusted body of loving souls, far away from hostile parties.

== Filmography ==
Year	Title	Role	Notes	Ref.
1976	Alice, Sweet Alice	Alice Spages	Alternate titles: Communion, The Mask Murders, Holy Terror	
1982	Liquid Sky	Adrian		
1982	Tam Lin		Short film; unreleased	

== Sources ==
- Beghtol, LD (2006). The Magnetic Fields' 69 Love Songs. New York City, New York: Continuum. ISBN 978-1-441-13063-1.
- Everman, Welch (2000). Cult Horror Films: From Attack of the 50 Foot Woman to Zombies of Mora Tau. Secaucus, New Jersey: Carol Publishing Group. ISBN 978-0-806-51425-3.
- Howarth, Troy (2021). Unholy Communion: Alice, Sweet Alice, from Script to Screen. Orlando, Florida: BearManor Media. ISBN 978-1-629-33766-1.
- Smith, Richard Harland (2019). Alice, Sweet Alice (Blu-ray audio commentary). Arrow Films. OCLC 1296652483.
- Sole, Alfred; Salier, Edward (1999) [1997]. Alice, Sweet Alice (DVD audio commentary). Troy, Michigan: Anchor Bay Entertainment. OCLC 178777132.
