= Fever Lake =

- Directed by: Rafe M. Portilo
- Written by: Jalee Bailey; Michael Edwards
- Produced by: Jamie Elliott; Ralph E. Portillo
- Starring: Corey Haim; Mario Lopez; Bo Hopkins
- Music by: Robert J. Walsh
- Distributed by: ETD Distribution Company
- Release dates: October 8, 1997 (Finland); October 14, 1997 (USA)
- Running time: 90 minutes
- Language: English

Fever Lake, also known as Demon Kid, is an American direct-to-video horror film that was released in 1997. It stars Corey Haim, Mario Lopez and Bo Hopkins.

== Plot ==
The film opens with Albert hiding from his father in the attic, as his mother had warned him to stay up there regardless of what he heard. He does as he is told and is forced to listen to his father murder his mother, after which the man warns that Albert has the same evil inside of him. Albert is eventually discovered and sent to live with a foster mother.

Many years later Albert has returned to the house with his friends and his girlfriend Sarah, who hopes to use the time to write. Their arrival is far from welcomed and the group is encouraged to leave, as the townspeople are wary that history will repeat itself. They are also concerned of a legend that the lake contains an evil spirit that is responsible for a series of brutal murders in the surrounding area. Every time death happens, a little boy is left as the only survivor. The townspeople's fears appear to be warranted after a local waitress is slaughtered by a wolf while she is walking near the house, despite no reports of wolves in the area.

The group is cautioned by Sheriff Harris to remain near the house, something that they do not appear to take seriously. Later that night Albert sees a vision of a young boy near the water and runs off. Soon after, Albert begins murdering his friends under the influence of the evil spirit until only Sarah is left alive. When he goes to her room to kill her as well, Albert discovers that Sarah has also been possessed by the spirit, who claims to be his mother. A horrified, but still possessed Albert then kills Sarah with an axe. The film then cuts to a deputy talking to a townsperson, stating that Albert was found in the midst of the carnage and that he had been taken into custody. They expect that he will spend the rest of his life in a mental institution and revealing that he had previously been institutionalized for murdering his foster mother. The deputy then reveals that they only located two of the three women who had accompanied Albert, implying that Sarah's body is the one missing. The film ends with Sheriff Harris attempting to burn down Albert's family home, only for this to be unsuccessful. A local Native American man claims that the spirit will not allow the home to burn and that it will eventually return after it has rested.

== Cast ==
- Corey Haim as Albert
- Bo Hopkins as Sheriff Harris
- Mario Lopez as Steve
- Lauren Parker as Sarah
- Randy Josselyn as Bobby
- Mary-Rachel Foot as Danielle
- Mathea Webb as Christy
- Michael Wise as Clear Springs

== Production ==
Filming took place in Kenosha County and Twin Lakes, Wisconsin during October 1995. Specific filming locations included a lake house at Elizabeth Lake and Carthage College. Corey Haim, Mario Lopez, Bo Hopkins, and Randy Josselyn were confirmed as starring in Fever Lake.

== Release and legacy ==
In America, Fever Lake premiered on October 9, 1997 at a gala invite-only charity event in Kenosha, where it had been filmed. It would be released direct-to-video a few days later, in time for Halloween 1997. Producer Jim Kreutzer stated in an August 1997 interview that “We always knew this was a straight-to-video release." Fever Lake was the subject of a 2015 RiffTrax satirical commentary track.

== Reception ==
Alice Anne Conner reviewed Fever Lake for the Kenosha News, commenting that the script was confusing and that Haim's performance was disappointing, but that she had otherwise enjoyed the film.
