= Reggie (TV series) =

- Genre: Sitcom
- Based on: The Fall and Rise of Reginald Perrin by David Nobbs
- Developed by: Dinah Kirgo; Julie Kirgo
- Starring: Richard Mulligan; Dianne Kay; Jean Smart
- Opening theme: "The Real Me" performed by Richard Mulligan
- Country of origin: United States
- Original language: English
- No. of seasons: 1
- No. of episodes: 6

Production
- Producers: Bernie Kukoff; Dinah Kirgo; Julie Kirgo; Andrew J. Selig
- Camera setup: Multi-camera
- Running time: 30 minutes
- Production companies: Fox-Unicorn; Can't Sing Can't Dance Productions; Columbia Pictures Television

Original release
- Network: ABC
- Release: August 2 – September 1, 1983

Reggie is an American sitcom that aired on ABC from August 2 until September 1, 1983; it was based on the British sitcom The Fall and Rise of Reginald Perrin.

== Premise ==
Middle-aged Reggie Potter worries about work and home life, while having sexy fantasies about his co-worker.

== Cast ==
- Richard Mulligan as Reggie Potter
- Barbara Barrie as Elizabeth Potter
- Timothy Busfield as Mark Potter
- Dianne Kay as Linda Potter Lockett
- Timothy Stack as Tom Lockett
- Chip Zien as C.J. Wilcox
- Jean Smart as Joan Reynolds

== Episodes ==
All episodes aired on the ABC network. The first episode aired at 9:30 pm on Tuesday, August 2, 1983. All subsequent episodes aired on Thursday nights at 9:00 pm.

No.	Title	Directed by	Written by	Original release date
1	"Mark's Girlfriend"	John Bowab	Julie Kirgo and Dinah Kirgo	August 2, 1983
Reggie has fantasies about his son's new girlfriend.
2	"The Seduction of Reggie"	Ellen Gittelsohn	David Landsberg and Lorin Dreyfuss	August 4, 1983
Reggie tries to make some of his fantasies about his secretary into reality.
3	"That's Life"	Chris Parnell	John Bowab	August 11, 1983
Reggie meets an old high school buddy.
4	"Reggie's Warning"	Unknown	Unknown	August 18, 1983
Reggie tries to come up with a new ad campaign for ice cream.
5	"It's My Party and I'll Die If I Want To"	Unknown	Unknown	August 25, 1983
Reggie tries to entertain a Japanese business client.
6	"Once a Father"	Unknown	Unknown	September 1, 1983
Reggie's daughter is hired by Funtime Desserts as Miss Double Dipper.

== Reception ==
John Corry, writing in The New York Times, had a mixed response to the series. Corry stated that the series "ha[s] its moments", writing that the topic of male midlife crisis "isn't a bad idea for a comedy series". He noted that Mulligan portrayed Reggie with much the same persona as that of his character in Soap: "He dithers, he does double takes, he mugs. If you think this is funny, you'll think Reggie is funny." Writing about the opening episode, Corry noted that the sexual fantasies within the first episode were not risqué, writing that the series "pretends to be naughty, but like so many soap-opera comedies it really isn't". He noted that the writers "go in for antic humor, and much of the time they find it. But the parts don't add up to a whole, and Reggie is only another series about a klutz".
