= Under Cover (1987 film) =

- Film poster
- Directed by: John Stockwell
- Written by: Scott Fields; John Stockwell; Menahem Golan
- Produced by: Yoram Globus; Menahem Golan
- Starring: David Neidorf; Jennifer Jason Leigh
- Cinematography: Alexander Gruszynski
- Edited by: Sharyn L. Ross
- Music by: Albert Lee; Todd Rundgren
- Production company: The Cannon Group
- Release date: December 4, 1987
- Running time: 94 minutes
- Country: United States
- Language: English

Under Cover (also known as Fires Within) is a 1987 film directed by John Stockwell (in his directorial debut) and starring David Neidorf and Jennifer Jason Leigh.

== Premise ==
A cop goes undercover in a South Carolina high school. With the help of a local narcotics officer, he investigates the drug ring responsible for another cop's death.

== Cast ==
- David Neidorf as Sheffield
- Jennifer Jason Leigh as Tanille Lareoux
- Piper Cochrane as Becky
- Barry Corbin as Sergeant Irwin Lee
- David Denney as Hassie Pearl
- Kathleen Wilhoite as Corrinne Armour
