= Femina (film) =

1990 Polish film directed by Piotr Szulkin

- Directed by: Piotr Szulkin
- Written by: Krystyna Kofta
- Based on: Pawilon małych drapieżców (Pavilion of Small Predators) by Krystyna Kofta
- Starring: Hanna Dunowska
- Cinematography: Dariusz Kuc
- Music by: Zdzisław Szostak
- Production companies: Zespol Filmowy "Perspektywa"; Regina Ziegler Filmproduktion
- Release date: 1990
- Country: Poland
- Language: Polish

Femina is a 1990 Polish film directed by Piotr Szulkin, based on the novel Pawilon małych drapieżców (Pavilion of Small Predators) by Krystyna Kofta. The film stars Hanna Dunowska as Bogna Wegner, a woman who recalls her childhood memories while being torn between the ideologies of Catholicism and communism.

Marek Haltof called Femina "a film abundant with symbols", in which Szulkin "mocks the emptiness of Polish political and religious rituals. He debunks the ritual aspect of Polish culture and its martyrological character."
