= Shooting Range (film) =

Shooting Range (Тир)
- Directed by: Vladimir Tarasov
- Written by: Viktor Slavkin
- Cinematography: Kabul Rasulov
- Edited by: Margarita Mikheeva
- Music by: Vladimir Chekasin, Vyacheslav Ganelin, and Vladimir Tarasov
- Production company: Soyuzmultfilm
- Distributed by: Kino International (USA)
- Release date: 1979
- Running time: 21 minutes
- Country: USSR (USA release in 2007)

Shooting Range (Russian: Тир) is a 1979 Soviet animation film directed by Vladimir Tarasov. The film is twenty-one minutes long and is set to jazz music. It is a satirical critique of capitalism and life in the United States.

== Plot ==
In New York City, an unemployed young man (based on Holden Caulfield) finds a job in a shooting gallery as a living target. After a while, the man falls in love and lives in the gallery with his wife at gunpoint. Finally, they give birth to a baby, and the shooting range owner wants to use it as another target, too. Disgusted, the family flies off, but there are a lot of other unemployed people to fill their position.
