= Marek Walczewski =

Polish actor

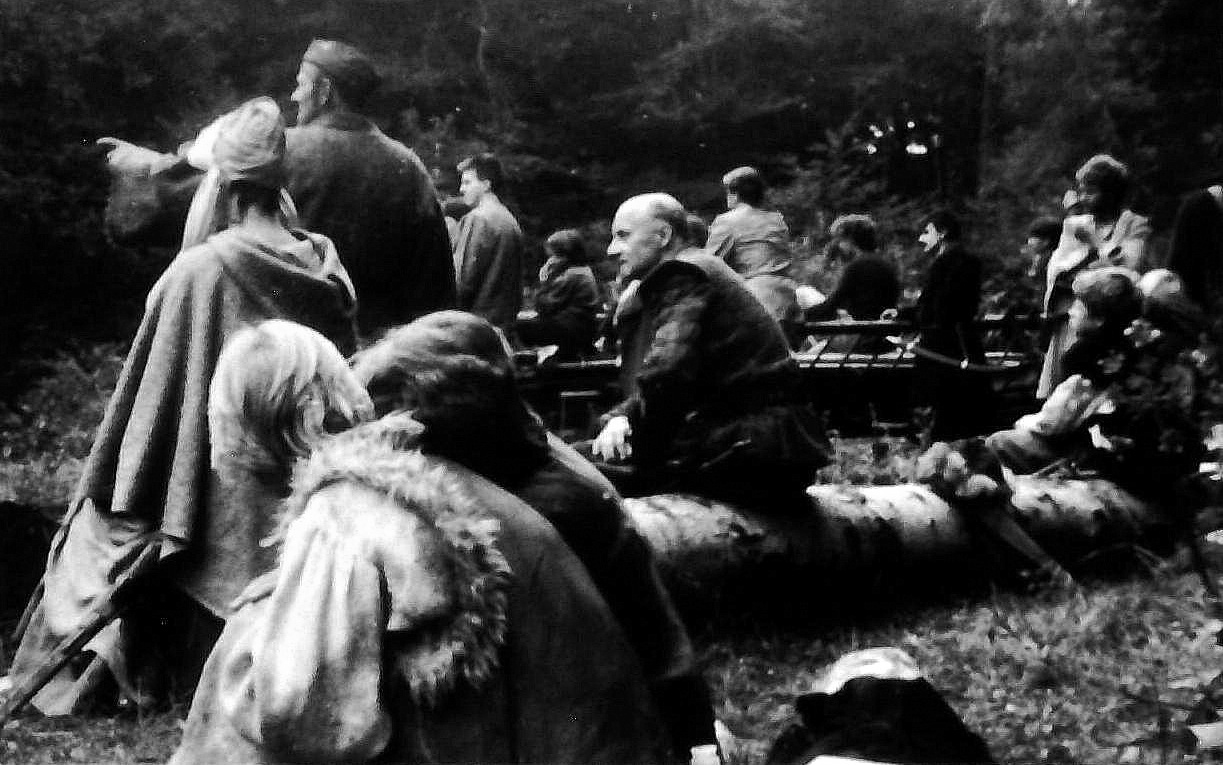
- Marek Walczewski (center) during the filming of crimes in Gruszka n. Lesko.
- Born: 9 April 1937; Kraków, Poland
- Died: 26 May 2009 (aged 72); Warsaw, Poland
- Occupation: Actor
- Years active: 1963–2004

Marek Walczewski (9 April 1937 – 26 May 2009) was a Polish actor. He appeared in 55 films and television shows between 1963 and 2004.

== Partial filmography ==
- Passenger (1963) - Tadeusz, husband of Marta
- Ruchome piaski (1969) - Father
- The Third Part of the Night (1971) - Rozenkranc
- The Wedding (1973) - Host
- The Promised Land (1975) - Bum-Bum
- The Story of Sin (1975) - Plaza-Splawski
- Nights and Days (1975) - Daleniecki
- W srodku lata (1976) - Dlugonos
- Death of a President (1977) - Eligiusz Niewiadomski
- Do krwi ostatniej (1978) - Władysław Anders
- The Tin Drum (1979) - Schugger-Leo
- Chcialbym sie zgubic... (1979) - Director Bulwa
- Golem (1980) - Pernat
- Spotkanie na Atlantyku (1980) - Walter
- The War of the Worlds: Next Century (1981) - Committee Receptionist
- Dolina Issy (1982) - Masiulis
- Przeprowadzka (1982)
- Synteza (1984) - Diaz
- O-Bi, O-Ba: The End of Civilization (1985) - Soft's Boss
- Vabank II, czyli riposta (1985) - Twardijewicz
- Ga, Ga - Chwala bohaterom (1986) - Oficer sledczy
- Nikt nie jest winien (1986) - Ryszard
- Cudzoziemka (1986) - Violinist January Badzki
- Kingsajz (1988) - Ala's Father
- Zabij mnie, glino (1988) - Paser
- Co lubia tygrysy (1989) - Sexuologist
- Havet stiger (1990) - Horvat
- Seszele (1991)
- Les enfants du vent (1991)
- A Bachelor's Life Abroad (1992) - Carousel Owner Schumann
- Conversation with a Cupboard Man (1993) - Teatcher
- Pajeczarki (1993) - Painter
- Enak (1993) - State Department
- Dwa ksiezyce (1993) - Mecenas
- El detective y la muerte (1994) - Hombre de Plástico
- Les Milles (1995) - Prof. Pick
- Dzien wielkiej ryby (1997) - Lawyer
- 13 posterunek - Sr. Aspirant Stępień
- The Hexer (2001) - Eyck of Denesle
- Ubu król (2003) - General Lascy
- Stranger (2004) - Stefan, father of Ewa
