= Contact (1978 film) =

- Screenshot from the film
- Directed by: Vladimir Tarasov
- Written by: Alexander Kostinsky
- Edited by: Natalia Abramova
- Music by: George Gershwin, Nino Rota
- Distributed by: Soyuzmultfilm
- Release date: 1978 (USSR)
- Running time: 9 min 47 sec
- Country: Soviet Union

Contact or Kontakt (Russian: Контакт) is a 1978 Soviet animated short film.

== Plot ==
During a beautiful summer day a painter walks around countryside. He stops by a butterfly thinking that some people would kill it to add to their collection, but the painter smiles and lets it fly away. Similarly, the painter watches a bird, but instead of capturing it, he lets it fly away as well. Going over a hill the painter finds a picturesque pond, and being extremely happy rushes towards it to have a rest next to the water.

While he is resting on the grass, humming the tune of Speak Softly Love, a large spaceship lands near him. An alien exits the spaceship, photographs the environment and tries to contact the painter by changing his appearance to resemble nearby animals and objects and by touching him. The painter is frightened and tries to run away losing his belongings one by one (boots, hat, scarf, smoking pipe and paints), but falls from a cliff and hurts his leg. The alien picks up the items in order to return them to the painter. But the painter thinks that the alien is going to lock him in a cage and torture as some people do with animals.

Unable to move further because of his hurt leg, the painter covers his head with his hands, ready to accept his fate. The alien approaches the painter and tries to hum the same tune that the painter hummed earlier, but makes some mistakes. The painter understands that the alien is friendly, tries to teach him how to hum the tune, and they walk away together hand in hand.

The film has no dialogue in any language. All communication is made using music, gestures and gazes; the alien also tries to communicate by shapeshifting. Director Vladimir Tarasov explored this theme of universal communication in his other films; he considered animation "the Esperanto of all mankind".

== Influence and recognition ==
Even though The Godfather films were not distributed in the Soviet Union, the theme music was familiar to Soviet people thanks to this short film.

Contact received awards at the following festivals:

- XVIII Festival of science fiction films in Trieste, 1979
- VIII Festival of short and documentary films in Lille, 1979

== Bibliography ==
- Soviet Film. 1979. p. 3.
- Soviet Film, Volumes 332-343. Sovexportfilm. 1985. p. 85.
- Soviet Film. 1986. p. 84.
- Bendazzi, Giannalberto (23 October 2015). Animation: A World History: Volume II: The Birth of a Style - The Three Markets. Boca Raton, FL: CRC Press. p. 292. ISBN 9781317519911.
