= Sharyn L. Ross =

American film editor

- Occupation: Film editor
- Years active: 1982–present

Sharyn L. Ross is an American film editor who began her career working on 1982's Liquid Sky.

== Selected filmography ==
- Peel (2019)
- Stolen from Suburbia (2015)
- Shouting Secrets (2011)
- Clubland (1999)
- Benefit of the Doubt (1993)
- There Goes the Neighborhood (1992)
- Heart of the Deal (1990)
- Ernest Goes to Jail (1990)
- Ernest Saves Christmas (1988)
- Doin' Time on Planet Earth (1988)
- Under Cover (1987)
- Playing for Keeps (1986)
- A Stroke of Genius (1984)
- Sleepaway Camp (1983)
- Liquid Sky (1982)
