= Brenda Hutchinson =

American classical composer

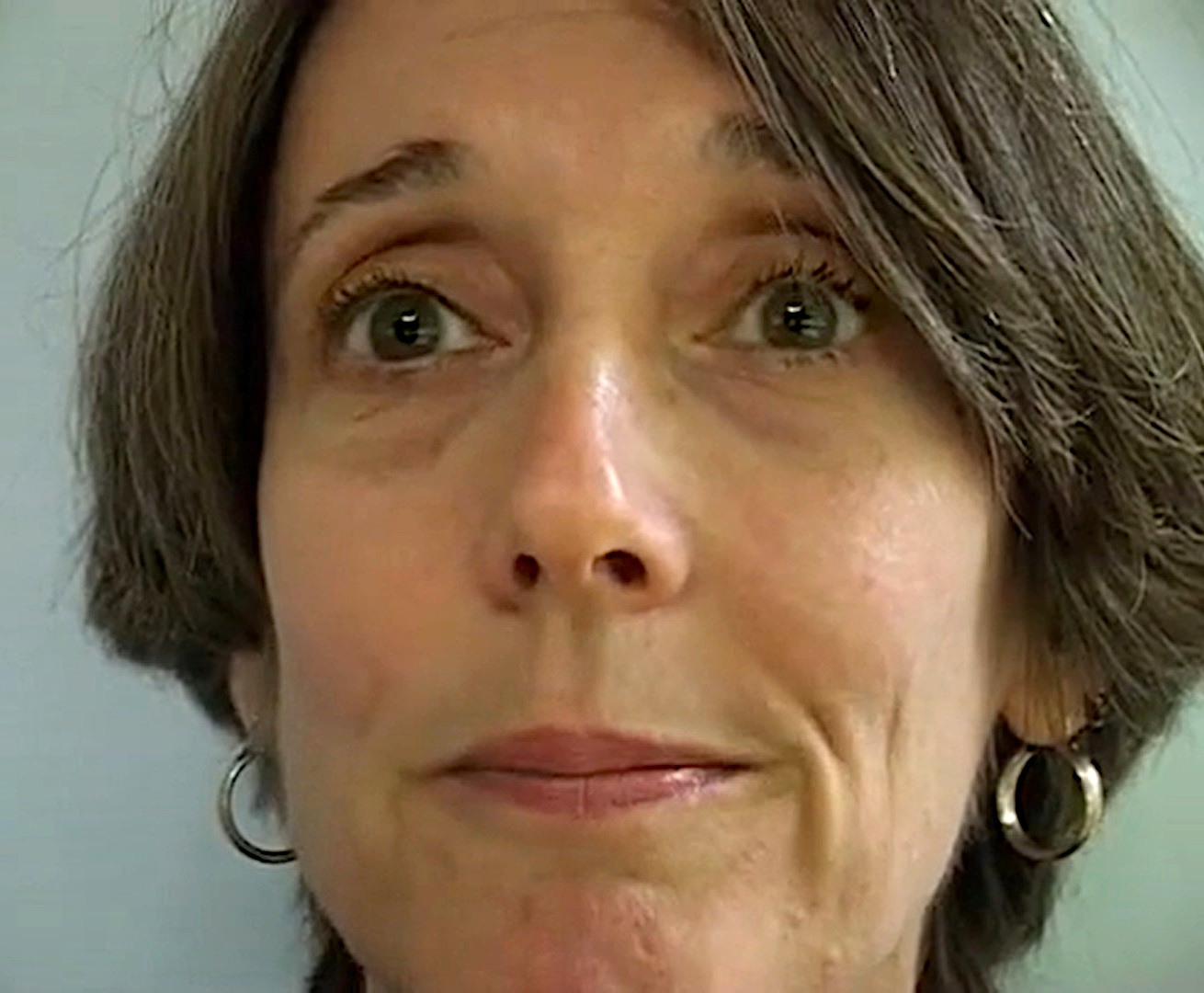
Brenda Hutchinson (circa 2003) in music is (Speaking Portraits) (Vol. I)

Brenda Hutchinson is an American composer and sound artist who has developed a body of work based on a perspective about interacting with the public and non-artists through personal, reciprocal engagement with listening and sounding. Hutchinson encourages her participants to experiment with sound, share stories, and make music. She often bases her electroacoustic compositions on recordings of these individual collaborative experiences, creating "sonic portraits" or "aural pictures" of people and situations.

In addition to her ethnographic pieces, Hutchinson has composed for film (Liquid Sky, 1982, co-composed with Clive Smith), invented instruments (Giant Music Box, Long Tube, and gestural interface for the Long Tube), and is active as a performer/improviser.

Hutchinson earned her M.A. in Music Composition from the University of California, San Diego, where she studied with Pauline Oliveros, Roger Reynolds, Bernard Rands, and Robert Erickson. Performances of her work have been presented in New York City at Lincoln Center, Merkin Concert Hall, and The Kitchen, as well as in San Francisco at New Langton Arts, The Lab, and the Exploratorium.

== Discography ==
- Liquid Sky (with Clive Smith), Varese Sarabande LP STV 81181, VCD47181, 1982.
- Interlude from Voices of Reason on TELLUS, The Audio Cassette Magazine, TELLUS #9, 1985.
- Slow Death on a Thorny Rose (with Gerald Lindahl) on TELLUS, The Audio Cassette Magazine, TELLUS #16 "Tango", 1987.
- EEEYAH! on The Aerial: A Journal in Sound, Aerial #4, 1989.
- Seldom Still, cassette, Pauline Oliveros Foundation, BH-C-1, 1989.
- Vanishing Act (with Constance DeJong) on Siteless Sounds, TELLUS #25, 1991.
- Long Tube Trio on Minimall, TELLUS #27, 1993.
- Family Album, VOYS, Pauline Oliveros Foundation, HB-CD-2, 1999.
- How Do You Get To Carnegie Hall?, soundprint.org and Third Coast Audio International Festival, https://www.thirdcoastfestival.org/explore/feature/how-do-you-get-to-carnegie-hall, 2001.
- Turaluralura Lament, Homo Sonorus: An International Anthology of Sound Poetry, Edited / Curated by Dmitry Bulatov, The National Center for Contemporary Art. Kaliningrad Branch, 2001.
- (New) Violet Flame, soundprint.org, http://soundprint.org/radio/display_show/ID/89/name/Violet+Flame, 2001.
- Long Tube-Solos and Duets, Pauline Oliveros Foundation, HB-CD-3, 2002.

== Bibliography ==
- Sabrina Peña Young. (2009). The Feminine Musique: Multimedia and Women Today. ISBN 978-0-557-08403-6
- Hinkle-Turner, Elizabeth (2006). Crossing the Line: Women Composers and Music Technology. Burlington, VT. Ashgate. ISBN 0-7546-0461-6
- Croydon, Philip ed. (2001). "New Grove Dictionary". Brenda Hutchinson. Macmillan Publishers Limited.
- Roberts, Mary Lee Being Around Brenda Hutchinson. Open Space Magazine, Spring 2001, issue 3

== Books and articles ==
- Hutchinson, Brenda. “Was hat das mit Musikzu tun?” Remembering Pauline Oliveros (translated from English into German for this publication), Musik Texte: Zeitschrift Für Neue Musik. Heft 152. February. (2017) Verlag Musik Text. Köln.
- Hutchinson, Brenda. “Sound, Listening, and Public Engagement”. Ear/Wave/Event. Issue Two: Listening? Online publication by Bill Dietz and Woody Sullender (2015).
- Hutchinson, Brenda. What Can You Do? reclaiming public space through direct engagement with strangers. (2012) ISBN 978-0-9859372-0-1
- Hutchinson, Brenda. “Tiny Offerings”. Deep Listening Anthology II: Scores from the Deep Listening Community. Edited by Marc Jensen. Deep Listening Publications (2010), p. 54
- Hutchinson, Brenda. "Sound Initiated Drawing and Memory Impairment". Perspectives on the Electroacoustic Work. Canadian Electroacoustic Community eContact! 12.4 (2010).
- Hutchinson, Brenda. "Don't Stop the Music". Exploratorium Quarterly, volume 10, issue 4, Winter (1986).
