= O-Bi, O-Ba: The End of Civilization =

- Theatrical release poster
- Directed by: Piotr Szulkin
- Written by: Piotr Szulkin
- Starring: Jerzy Stuhr; Krystyna Janda
- Cinematography: Witold Sobociński
- Edited by: Elżbieta Kurkowska
- Music by: Jerzy Satanowski
- Release date: 28 January 1985
- Running time: 85 minutes
- Country: Poland
- Language: Polish

O-Bi, O-Ba: The End of Civilization (Polish: O-bi, o-ba: Koniec cywilizacji) is a 1985 Polish post-apocalyptic drama film written and directed by Piotr Szulkin.

Starring Jerzy Stuhr and Krystyna Janda, the film takes place in a post-apocalyptic future where humans live in an isolated vault which is falling apart. Their only grain of hope lies in a vessel known as The Ark, which is said to be on its way to rescue them; however, the existence of The Ark is a myth planted by the main character, Soft, whose profession is to ensure that citizen morale is maintained.

== Plot ==
One year after the end of nuclear war, a collective of survivors are living in an underground city called "The Dome." Life for most citizens is nasty and brutish, but authorities' promises that prosperity will come soon in the form of a giant ark gives some hope for the future.

== Cast ==
- Jerzy Stuhr as Soft
- Krystyna Janda as Gea
- Mariusz Dmochowski as millionaire
- Kalina Jędrusik as millionaire's wife
- Marek Walczewski as Soft's boss
- Jan Nowicki as engineer
- Henryk Bista as chubby
- Leon Niemczyk as well kept
- Krzysztof Majchrzak as man in freezer
- Stanisław Igar as craftsman
- Mariusz Benoit as doctor
- Włodzimierz Musiał as Kraft

== Release ==
The film premiered in Poland on 28 January 1985. It was shown at the Polish Film Festival in Gdynia where Andrzej Kowalczyk won the prize for Best Production Design for his work on the film. The Polish DVD was released in December 2003 as part of a box set with two other Szulkin films, The War of the Worlds: Next Century and Ga-ga: Glory to the Heroes.

== Reception ==
Kim Newman found the movie to be a serious, respectful treatment of its subject.
