= Hongmei Zhang =

Chinese-American biostatistician

Hongmei Zhang is a Chinese-American biostatistician at the University of Memphis, where she is Bruns Endowed Professor in the Division of Epidemiology, Biostatistics, and Environmental Health Sciences, director of the division, program coordinator for biostatistics, and affiliated professor in the departments of mathematical sciences and biology. Her statistical interests include feature selection, biclustering, and Bayesian networks; she is also interested in the application of statistical methods to phenotype and genetic data and to epigenetics.

== Education and career ==
Zhang has three master's degrees: one in electronic engineering, earned in 1997 from the Nanjing Institute of Technology, a second one in mathematics in 1999 from Truman State University, and a third one in statistics in 2001 from Iowa State University. She completed her Ph.D. at Iowa State University in 2003. Her dissertation, Probability Models for Design and Analysis of Genetic Data, was supervised by Hal Stern.

She became an assistant professor of mathematics and statistics at the University of West Florida in 2003, and moved in 2007 to the University of South Carolina as an assistant professor of epidemiology and biostatistics. She was given tenure there as an associate professor in 2012. She moved to her present position at the University of Memphis in 2013, and was promoted to professor and given the Bruns Endowed Professorship in 2017.

== Contributions ==
Zhang is the author of Analyzing High-Dimensional Gene Expression and DNA Methylation Data with R (CRC Press, 2020).

Her research has included work on the role of epigenetics in childhood asthma.

== Recognition ==
Zhang was named a Fellow of the American Statistical Association in 2021. She was elected chair of the ASA Risk Analysis program in 2021.
