= Elizabeth Lake (Wisconsin and Illinois) =

Lake in the state of Wisconsin, United States

- Location within Illinois Location within Wisconsin Location within the United States
- Location: Kenosha County, Wisconsin; McHenry County, Illinois
- Coordinates: 42°30′30″N 88°16′08″W
- Type: Lake
- Etymology: named for Elizabeth Barrett Browning
- Basin countries: United States
- Surface area: 725 acres (293 ha)
- Max. depth: 32 ft (9.8 m)
- Surface elevation: 794 ft (242 m)

Elizabeth Lake is a lake in Kenosha County, Wisconsin and McHenry County, Illinois.

Elizabeth Lake was named for Elizabeth Barrett Browning, an English poet.

== See also ==
- List of lakes in Illinois
- List of lakes in Wisconsin
