= Dianne Kay =

American actress

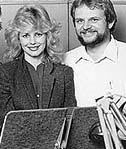
- Education: University of Arizona
- Occupation: Actress
- Years active: 1977–1999
- Known for: Nancy Bradford in Eight Is Enough
- Children: 1

Dianne Kay (born March 29, 1954) is an American retired actress best known for playing Nancy Bradford on ABC's Eight Is Enough from 1977 to 1981.

== Early years ==
Kay is the daughter of Peter and Miriam Kay. Her father was a state representative in Arizona. She began acting in Phoenix when she was 13, performing on stage and making commercials. She graduated from Arcadia High School in 1972 and graduated from the University of Arizona with a degree in TV programming and public relations. While at the university she modeled and produced some talk shows in Tucson.

== Career ==
Kay went to Hollywood in 1976, making a living by modeling and making TV commercials.

Kay had a large role in Steven Spielberg's period comedy film 1941 (1979). Kay played Richard Mulligan's daughter on the short-lived ABC sitcom Reggie in 1983. She later appeared in the Eight is Enough reunion television movies in 1987 and 1989. She appeared on the pilot episode of Flamingo Road, and was a regular on the short-lived series Glitter. Her last appearance was on a 1999 episode of Dick Van Dyke's detective series Diagnosis: Murder, as the unwitting wife of a serial killer.

== Filmography ==
Film and television
Year	Title	Role	Notes
1976	The Kids From C.A.P.E.R.	Meter Maid	Episode: "The Goodfather"
1977	Starsky & Hutch	Joanna Haymes	Episode: "The Psychic"
1977	Dog and Cat	Connie	Television movie
1977-1981	Eight Is Enough	Nancy Bradford	111 episodes
1979	1941	Betty Douglas	
1980	Flamingo Road	Annabelle Troy	Episode: "Pilot"
1981	The Nashville Grab	Katie Morrison	Television movie
1981	Fantasy Island	Beth Martinique	1 episode
1982	Cass Malloy	Tina Marie Nelson	1 episode (pilot for She's the Sheriff)
1982	Darkroom	Claire	Episode: "Who's There?"
1982	Portrait of a Showgirl	Marci	Television movie
1983	Trapper John, M.D.	Jeanette Murray	Episode: "Baby on the Line"
1983	Reggie	Linda Potter Lockett	6 episodes
1983	Hotel	Jenifer Jane Powell	Episode: "The Offer"
1984	Simon & Simon	Catherine 'Cathy' Donald	Episode: "The Wrong Stuff"; Episode: "Corpus Delecti"
1984	Fantasy Island	Roxanne Palmer	1 episode
1984	The Love Boat	Leslie Palmer	1 episode
1984-1985	Glitter	Jennifer Douglas	13 episodes
1987	Once a Hero	Rachel Kirk	Episode: "Pilot"
1987	Murder, She Wrote	Monica Blane	Episode: "Witness for the Defense"
1987	Eight Is Enough: A Family Reunion	Nancy Bradford	Television movie
1987	Jake and the Fatman	Sally Rogers	Episode: "Love for Sale"
1988	Andy Colby's Incredible Adventure	Mrs. Colby	
1989	An Eight Is Enough Wedding	Nancy Bradford	Television movie
1994	Hangin' with Mr. Cooper	Reporter	Episode: "No Money"
1998	Falling Sky	Waitress	Direct-to-video
1999	Diagnosis: Murder	Anne Weber	Episode: "Voices Carry"
