= Button (film) =

- Directed by: Vladimir Tarasov
- Distributed by: Soyuzmultfilm
- Release date: 1982 (Soviet Union)
- Running time: 11 minutes
- Country: Soviet Union

Button (Russian: Пуговица, romanized: Pugovitsa) is a Soviet animated film directed by Vladimir Tarasov and released by the Soyuzmultfilm studio in 1982. It is based on a short story by Herbert G. Wells.

== Plot ==
A young artist sits in his studio in front of a blank canvas, searching for inspiration for his next painting. His concentration is constantly interrupted by the annoying buzzing of a fly. When he finally catches the fly, he doesn’t kill it but instead lets it out the window. However, the fly soon returns and lands on a mirror. As the artist tries to catch it, he glimpses his own reflection, sparking the idea to paint a self-portrait. But as he sketches the pencil outline, he notices one of the buttons on his shirt is poorly sewn. Frustrated by this small imperfection, he tries to fix it, pricks his finger, and, annoyed, rips the button off altogether. Then, as he colors in the portrait, he begins to transform it—imagining himself as a wealthy playboy in a fancy suit, set against the backdrop of a new car, a luxurious mansion with a pool, and even a private jet (in the film’s monochrome style, the portrait becomes vividly colored in these fantasy elements).

Unexpectedly, the painted version of himself comes to life: when a fly lands on the canvas, this double coldly and deliberately kills it. Thinking it’s a figment of his imagination, the artist shows the portrait to his beloved girlfriend, proud of the result. But the painted version, growing more like the artist’s opposite, begins to flirt with her, enticing her to enter his luxurious world within the painting. Disturbed, the artist grabs a can of white paint and covers the portrait. Upset at missing her chance to step into this painted world of luxury, the girlfriend runs off.

In the final scene, the artist stands in a gallery, watching a crowd gather around his unembellished self-portrait, drawn simply in pencil. His girlfriend approaches him and sews back on the button he had ripped off—this time, the button is colored, adding a touch of vibrancy to his otherwise monochrome reality.
