= Contract (1985 film) =

- Directed by: Vladimir Tarasov
- Distributed by: Soyuzmultfilm
- Release date: 1985 (USSR)
- Running time: 10 mins, 3 seconds
- Country: Soviet Union

Contract (Russian: Контракт) is a 1985 Soviet/Russian animation based on the short science fiction story Company Store (1958) by Robert Silverberg and directed by Vladimir Tarasov. The song I Can't Give You Anything but Love, Baby is used in the animation.

== Plot ==
A colonist arrives on a deserted planet and is immediately attacked by various monsters. Moments before the colonist meets his death, a protective field is activated by the trading robot QBF-41. It turns out that the monsters are merely a ploy used by the robot.

Using the mass transmitter (a device that creates "everything necessary for life" for free), the colonist orders shaving razors which arrives at a huge shipping cost. It turns out that luxuries do not fall under the umbrella of the necessities of life. However QBF-41 offers a sample tube of shaving cream free of charge. The colonist asks to pay for it and it turns out he has no right to use the services of a competing firm. The robot also receives a similar warning and is deactivated. The colonist is then deprived from food and the mass transmitter. The colonist uses batteries from his life supplies to reactivate the robot, and together they are left alone on the surface of a lifeless planet.

== Bibliography ==
- Soviet Film, Volumes 332-343. Sovexportfilm. 1985. p. 85.
