= Randy Josselyn =

American film and television actor (born 1974)

Randy Josselyn (born February 1, 1974) is an American film and television actor whose TV appearances include Family Matters, Undressed, 7th Heaven, The Fresh Prince of Bel-Air, Picket Fences and Full House.

== Early life and education ==
He was born on February 1, 1974, in Los Angeles, California. He graduated from Trabuco Hills High School in 1992.

== Career ==
He first started his career by appearing in 104 episodes of Down to Earth as J.J. Preston. This was later followed by an appearance in Dolly in 1987, starring as Andy Colby in the film Andy Colby's Incredible Adventure, Punky Brewster and Too Good To be True in 1988.

He also starred in Fever Lake (1996) with Corey Haim and Mario Lopez.

== Filmography ==
=== Film ===
Year	Film	Role	Notes
1988	Andy Colby's Incredible Adventure	Andy Colby	
1988	Too Good to Be True		
1993	Sworn to Vengeance		
1996	Fever Lake	Bobby	

=== TV ===
Year	Series	Role	Notes
1984-1987	Down To Earth	J.J. Preston	
1987	Dolly		
1988	Punky Brewster	Jimmy	
1989	Just the 10 of Us	Peter	
1989–1990	Family Matters	Rodney Beckett	
1991	Full House	Ryan	
1992	Blossom	Chad	
1992	The Fresh Prince of Bel Air	Student	
1993	Phenom	Jesse	
1994	Picket Fences	Jimmy	
1994	Sister, Sister	Bellboy	
1998	7th Heaven	George	
1999	Undressed	Dean	
