= Andy Colby's Incredible Adventure =

- Directed by: Deborah Brock
- Written by: Deborah Brock; Jed Horovitz
- Produced by: Roger Corman; Jed Horovitz
- Starring: Randy Josselyn; Dianne Kay; Chuck Kovacic; John Franklin; Vince Edwards
- Cinematography: David Sperling
- Edited by: Tim Amyx
- Music by: Ernest Troost; James Horner
- Production company: Concorde-New Horizons
- Distributed by: Concorde-New Horizons
- Release date: 1988
- Running time: 75 minutes
- Country: United States
- Language: English

Andy Colby's Incredible Adventure is a 1988 science fiction children's film directed by Deborah Brock and written by Brock and Jed Horovitz. It stars Randy Josselyn, Dianne Kay, Chuck Kovacic, John Franklin, and Vince Edwards. Its plot is about a boy who has to travel through several videos and static-filled channels in order to rescue his sister, who was snatched into the television because she sat too close to it.

As it was thought the film's original release title would be confused with Bill & Ted's Excellent Adventure, the name was changed to Andy and the Airwave Rangers for 1989 video release. The film is referred to as a full-length "cheater" in that it takes advantage of film highlights gleaned from previous Roger Corman films Space Raiders, Wizards of the Lost Kingdom, Deathsport, Chopping Mall, and Wheels of Fire.

== Plot ==
Andy Colby (Randy Josselyn) is a 12-year-old boy with too much time on his hands and an addiction to movies. He goes to a local video store looking for a movie he hasn't seen and asks the crazy video store clerk (John Bluto), for a real adventure. He is given a new video that isn't even on the shelves yet. He is also given instructions to never let go of the remote and don't sit too close to the television.

Unfortunately, his sister Bonnie (Jessica Puscas) is instead sucked into the TV and Andy has to rescue her. In his haste he ends up letting go of the remote and gets too close to the screen. With the help of characters from past movies, Andy has to face many trials to get his sister away from the purple and barely menacing villain, Lord Chroma (Chuck Kovacic).

== Cast ==
- Randy Josselyn as Andy Colby
- Dianne Kay as Mrs. Colby
- John Bluto as Video Store Clerk
- Chuck Kovacic as Lord Chroma
- Don Sparks as The Glitch
- John Franklin as The Gatekeeper
- Lara Piper as Bionda
- Jessica Puscas as Bonnie Colby
- Vince Edwards as Space Raider
- Patsy Pease as Space Raider
- Luca Bercovici as Space Raider
- Drew Snyder as Space Raider
- Thom Christopher as Space Raider
- Don Washburn as Space Raider
- Bo Svenson as Kor The Conqueror
- Erik Estrada
- Richard Thomas

== Release ==
After its limited 1988 theatrical release as Andy Colby’s Incredibly Awesome Adventure, the film was released in 1989 as Andy and the Airwave Rangers. Over its various video releases the film was sometimes titled Andy Colby's Incredible Video Adventure. This film had little impact on the market of the late 80s. It is a ‘B’ film and was considered so in its various straight to VHS releases. Though released in VHS in 1989 and DVD in 2006, the film can still be found theatrically at locations showing older films, such as The Cinefamily Silent Movie Theater in Los Angeles.

== Criticism ==
Allrovi wrote that with the film's "crazy-quilt melange", its "young stars perform as well as possible under the circumstances (it's hard to be convincing while reacting to stock footage), but the film's acting honors go to Chuck Kovacic as the wigged-out villain." The film had DVD release on February 7, 2006 by Walt Disney Video.
