= Death Run =

1987 film by Mike Murphy

- DVD cover
- Directed by: Michael J. Murphy
- Produced by: Jeanne Griffin
- Starring: Rob Bartlett; Debbi Stevens; Eddie Kirby; Wendy Parsons; Patrick Olliver
- Music by: Graham Hunt; Philip Love; Unbreaker & Cature; Truffle
- Distributed by: Powerhouse Films
- Release date: 1987
- Running time: 70 minutes
- Country: United Kingdom
- Language: English
- Budget: £20,000 (estimated)

Death Run is a 1987 low-budget British science fiction film directed by Michael J. Murphy. Shot on Super 8mm, it contains bargain basement production values but a great deal of action scenes and dynamic camerawork.

== Plot ==
Just before a nuclear war breaks out, a scientist at the British National Research Centre puts Paul (Rob Bartlett) and his girlfriend Jenny (Wendy Parsons) into suspended animation so they can live to see better days. 25 years later, the unit runs out of power and the couple is reanimated.

They camp in peace for a few days, until they are beset and captured by a biker gang. The gang take Jenny and Paul to their home, a decadent city led by the Messiah (Patrick Olliver), a nazi chic-wearing megalomaniac with a deformed hand. Jenny is enrolled into the Messiah's harem while Paul is thrown in a cell. He is contacted by a sympathetic jailer called Barbara (Debri Stevens), who promises to arrange his escape and spare him from being forced to participate in "the Run".

A prisoner with no name, known as Hero (Eddie Kirby), joins Paul and tells him he was the only man to ever survive the Run. They team up to escape: when Barbara arrives to feed them, they initiate a fight with her guards, which they win with Barbara's help. They subdue the rest of the gang by releasing captive mutants, who gleefully start killing the bikers. They then hijack a car and pick up Jenny. They fight some more gang members when they reach a gasworks at the outskirts of the city, and keep driving until they run out of petrol.

They encounter a pregnant woman (Kate Kneafsey), who shares their hatred of the Messiah and shelters them among her people. A romance begins to blossom between Barbara and Hero. That night, however, they find Jenny dead and realise that their hosts are cannibals. They kill all but the pregnant woman, who reveals that she was raped by the Messiah and that the gang were using her resulting pregnancy to make her seem sympathetic to the rebels. They forgive her and decide to move on to elude pursuit by the Messiah's cronies. They don't go far before being ambushed by mutants, and they use up all their petrol incinerating them.

Hero comes up with a plan: he trains Paul until he is fit enough to survive the Run, then lets him get captured by the Messiah. Paul performs the Run, which turns out to involve running down a hill while handcuffed to a metal wire which is fed with high-voltage electricity, all while fighting mutants bare-handed. Paul runs down the hill all the way into the forest, where the Messiah cannot see him, and thus allows Hero to get rid of the mutants for him and break his cuffs. Hero also captures a crony and handcuffs him to the wire to act as a decoy.

The Messiah learns of the trick though, and sends all his men after the two. They dispatch most of them with ease, although Hero has a protracted wrestling match with a burly crony. He eventually succeeds in impaling his opponent with a fence post. The Messiah is finally left vulnerable, and his harem girls take turns stabbing him, until Paul finishes him off with a machete. Paul promises to end the Messiah's evil and found a new society based on good.

Some time later, Paul is building a house for his village of good. The pregnant woman has had her baby, and he allows her to shelter in the house to breastfeed. The film ends with a shot of the baby's hand, which is deformed just like the Messiah's.

== Reception ==
Owing to its obscurity, this film has not been reviewed by many eminent critics, and is best known among genre film fans. It has achieved some popularity there, including a complimentary review at The Zone and from Internet personality Johnny Shitcase of Shitcase Cinema, who found it highly amusing.
