= Liquid Sky =

1982 science fiction film by Slava Tsukerman

- Theatrical release poster
- Directed by: Slava Tsukerman
- Written by: Slava Tsukerman; Anne Carlisle; Nina V. Kerova
- Produced by: Slava Tsukerman; Nina V. Kerova; Robert E. Field
- Starring: Anne Carlisle; Paula E. Sheppard
- Cinematography: Yuri Neyman
- Edited by: Sharyn L. Ross
- Music by: Slava Tsukerman; Clive Smith; Brenda I. Hutchinson
- Distributed by: Cinevista; Media Home Entertainment
- Release date: August 1982 (Montreal World Film Festival)
- Running time: 112 minutes
- Country: United States
- Language: English
- Budget: US$500,000
- Box office: $1.7 million

Liquid Sky is a 1982 American independent science fiction film directed by Slava Tsukerman and starring Anne Carlisle and Paula E. Sheppard. It debuted at the Montreal Film festival in August 1982 and was well received at several film festivals thereafter. It was produced with a budget of $500,000. It became the most successful independent film of 1983, grossing $1.7 million worldwide.

The film is seen as heavily influencing a club scene that emerged in the early 2000s in Brooklyn, Berlin, Paris, and London called electroclash.

== Plot ==
A New Wave fashion show is being held in a crowded Manhattan nightclub. Among the models are bisexual, cocaine-addicted Margaret and her similarly cocaine-addicted nemesis Jimmy. Margaret's drug-dealing girlfriend, Adrian, is constantly hassled by Jimmy because he does not have the money to pay for more drugs.

A small flying saucer lands on the roof of the penthouse apartment occupied by Margaret and Adrian. Jimmy accompanies Margaret home before the show, looking for Adrian's drugs. Margaret and Jimmy return to the club to participate in the show. During preparations, both agree to a photo shoot the following night on Margaret's rooftop. Margaret is subsequently raped by a man she meets in the nightclub.

German scientist Johann Hoffman has been secretly observing the aliens from the Empire State Building. Johann needs somewhere to continue his surveillance when the observation deck closes. He seeks help from the only person he knows in the city, college drama teacher Owen, who is on his way to meet a former student. Johann shows him a photo of the alien, which looks like a retina. Seeking a vantage point on his own, Johann stumbles into Sylvia's building. Sylvia, who is Jimmy's mother, invites him to her apartment for dinner. Across town, Katherine states her objection to the heroin use of her boyfriend, failed writer and addict Paul.

Margaret is seduced by Owen, her former acting professor. After having sex with Margaret, Owen dies and a translucent crystal protrudes from his head. She removes it, revealing no blood and when completely free of the wound, it evaporates into thin air.

Adrian returns to the penthouse and discovers Owen's corpse, but she is not bothered. Adrian decides to lead a hell-themed wake for Owen. In a bout of psychopathic narcissism and necrophilia, Adrian mounts Owen's face and climaxes while Margaret watches, who pleads for her to stop. A fight ensues and Adrian draws a switchblade on Margaret. They struggle over control of the knife and eventually give up. Adrian then puts Owen's body in a cardboard box and drags it onto the roof where she comforts Margaret, saying they will leave the body behind and depart for Berlin. She leaves to retrieve food for dinner.

At a liquor store, Adrian is confronted by Johann, who attempts to warn her, but is snubbed by a paranoid Adrian, who is convinced Johann is a cop. While Margaret is alone in the apartment, Paul, Adrian's client, returns; Paul attempts to rape her but he is killed by the same crystal. After realizing everyone she has sex with dies, Paul's body disappears.

From Sylvia's apartment, Johann continues his observation between dinner and dodging Sylvia's attempts to seduce him. Adrian arrives home and they prepare a rotisserie chicken and potatoes in aluminum pans on their bed. They are interrupted when the crew arrives at the apartment for the fashion shoot.

During the shoot, Margaret is taunted by Jimmy and the crew, so she forces him to have oral sex with her, knowing it will kill him. After he dies, his body instantly disappears. Adrian, confronted by this anomalous death, antagonizes Margaret into having sex with her, to prove her wrong while playing into her egotistic complex of dominance over the submissive Margaret, who pleads with her not to. Margaret is then held down by the stylist and her companion while Adrian rapes Margaret, achieving climax; she then disappears.

Margaret unplugs all the lights, and applies glow make up while she rants about her identity, upbringing, society and the culture of 1980s Manhattan. She then returns to the club and sees the strange man who raped her and convinces him to go back with her to her apartment, as he is thrilled by her newfound deadly prowess.

Margaret has sex with the date rapist and his body disappears afterwards. She then looks out the window and speaks to the invisible entity "Indian" that she associates with the deaths. After witnessing the deaths through the window in Sylvia's apartment, Johann goes across the street to Margaret's apartment.

Johann reveals that the alien in the flying saucer is extracting endorphins produced by the brain when an orgasm occurs. Margaret survived because she never experienced an orgasm. Margaret stabs Johann to death, which Sylvia witnesses through a telescope. Seeing the alien craft leaving, Margaret injects herself with heroin to induce a wild autoerotic orgasm to ensure the aliens take her with them.

Sylvia and Katherine arrive at the apartment together and reach the penthouse in time to see Margaret being abducted by the aliens. The saucer floats off into outer space.

== Cast ==
- Anne Carlisle as Margaret/Jimmy
- Paula E. Sheppard as Adrian
- Susan Doukas as Sylvia
- Otto von Wernherr as Johann Hoffman
- Bob Brady as Owen
- Elaine C. Grove as Katherine
- Stanley Knap as Paul
- Jack Adalist as Vincent
- Lloyd Ziff as Lester
- Harry Lum as Chinese Food Deliveryman
- Roy MacArthur as Jack
- Sara Carlisle as Nellie
- Nina V. Kerova as Designer
- Alan Preston as Photographer
- Christine Hatfull as Hair Stylist

== Production ==
Liquid Sky was an adaptation and formation from a previous script titled "Sweet Sixteen" from director Slava Tsukerman. After not being able to fund the script, Tsukerman knew he needed to write a new script that would be producible. His wife, Nina V. Kerova, had been writing scripts based on a woman who could not orgasm. He had an idea for a movie about aliens from outer space. He and his wife started collaborating; because of language barriers and American speech, they hired friend and co-writer Anne Carlisle to help them write the script. After the three writers collaborated over dinner one night, the title "Liquid Sky" was born.

Liquid Sky was produced and directed by Slava Tsukerman, who, prior to making Liquid Sky, had had a successful career as a documentary and TV film director in the USSR and Israel. The screenplay was written by Tsukerman, his wife and ubiquitous co-producer Nina V. Kerova, and Anne Carlisle, who also enacted the film's two leading roles. The director of photography, Yuri Neyman, a Russian émigré, was also the film's special effects expert. Anne Carlisle also wrote a novel based on the film in 1987.

Although the film is loosely centered around early 1980s punk subculture, the film's score uses a series of strident synthesizer music pieces. The music was composed by Slava Tsukerman, Clive Smith and Brenda Hutchinson using the Fairlight CMI. Most of it was original, but included interpretations of Baroque composer Marin Marais's Sonnerie de Ste-Geneviève du Mont-de-Paris, Carl Orff's Trionfo di Afrodite, and Anthony Philip Heinrich's Laurel Waltz. All of these were orchestrated in a series of ominous, dissonant arrangements and nightmarish marches. Excerpts from "Beautiful Bend" by Boris Midney are also featured.

=== Filming ===
Liquid Sky was shot without any major actors, large funding, or even permits. It was shot in several downtown New York City locations.

=== Cinematography ===
Yuri Neyman, A.S.C., is both the cinematographer and special effects director for Liquid Sky. Director Slava Tsukerman, cinematographer Yuri Neyman, and Production Designer Marina Levikova worked closely together to create the distinct, unique cinematic look and vivid feel of Liquid Sky. The overall look and feel of the film was inspired by German Expressionism and Bertolt Brecht. At the time, "punk" was not well known. The crew and cinematographer knew that they needed to "create" a feel and look for "punk". The cinematography in Liquid Sky is a form of expressionism. The film was shot to make you feel the emotions of the characters, expressed through powerful light, colors, contrast, composition, and movement. The reality of the cinematography is a world expressed and painted with emotion rather than practicality. All three department heads were successful filmmakers from the USSR who discovered filmmaking in their teenage years. The cinematography was well received by the community and filmmakers. In a 1984 February issue of American Cinematographer, reviewers of Liquid Sky cinematography were quoted as saying it is "the picture's asset" and "On its simplest level, it could be just as satisfying to be watched with its sound off, as a spectacular work of moving art." The magazine would go as far as to comment "New York has never been photographed better before."

The film was shot on 35mm film and had an aspect ratio of 1.85:1. It was re-released in 2017 with 4K master restore to digital.

=== Sound design ===
To create unusual sounds by manipulating real-world sounds, director Slava Tsukerman chose to use a digital sampling synthesizer known as the Fairlight CMI. Brenda Hutchinson and Clive Smith were the music composers for the soundtrack. During the process, Tsukerman brought over three or four classical music pieces that would be programmed into the Fairlight CMI. Much like a computer, every sound and every note would be programmed with a code. When composing, Tsukerman would tap a rhythm or hum a melody, and Hutchinson and Smith would play around with ideas on the Fairlight. Percussion sounds were used throughout the movie. Tsukerman often rejected re-recording a tape when not perfect, loving the rawness of the imperfections. He was quoted as saying "No, I like it. Let’s make it quick and dirty." During foley and sound design, materials such as wind chimes, metal, glass, and wood were used to create the sounds of the alien creatures. While composing, Smith never saw a visual from the film. He did not see his work integrated with the visuals until the premiere. He created music and sound solely from what Tsukerman communicated to him. He said that he and Hutchinson were the composers, but that Tsukerman had the vision.

== Release and reception ==
=== Home media ===
The film was digitally restored in 4K resolution in 2017 by Vinegar Syndrome, and released as a Blu-ray/DVD combo pack on April 24, 2018.

J. Hoberman of The New York Times wrote: "On Variety’s top-grossing film chart for over half a year, Liquid Sky was perhaps the most successful independent film of its day".

=== Critical response ===
On review aggregator website Rotten Tomatoes, the film holds an approval rating of 93%, based on 27 reviews, and an average rating of 7.2/10.

=== Awards ===
- Montreal World Film Festival – First Jury Award
- Sydney Film Festival – Audience Award
- Cartagena Film Festival – Special Jury Prize for Visual Impact
- Brussels International Film Festival – Special Prize of the Jury
- Cinemanila International Film Festival – Special Jury Prize

== Legacy ==
=== Sequel ===
In a 2014 interview with The Awl, Slava Tsukerman confirmed that he intended to make a sequel, Liquid Sky 2; with Anne Carlisle returning in the role of Margaret.

As of 2020, however, the script had still not been completed, Tsukerman claiming that Carlisle was returning to New York to work with him on it.

=== Novelization ===
Anne Carlisle wrote a novel Liquid Sky based on the screenplay of the movie. It was published as a Dolphin (Doubleday) paperback in 1987.

== See also ==
- I Come in Peace, a 1990 science fiction film in which an alien extracts endorphins from humans by forcibly overdosing them on artificial heroin
- List of cult films
