= Vladimir Tarasov =

Russian animator and animation director (born 1939)

Vladimir Tarasov Владимир Тарасов
- Born: Vladimir Ilich Tarasov; 7 February 1939 (age 86); Moscow, USSR
- Occupation(s): Animator; Animation director

Vladimir Ilich Tarasov (Russian: Владимир Ильич Тарасов; born 7 February 1939 in Moscow) is a Russian animator and animation director. He is best known for his Soviet-era science fiction short films, such as The Pass, Contact and Contract, among others.

== Biography ==
He studied at the Moscow Polygraphic Institute (Moscow Fine Art and Design University) from 1965 until 1970. Since 1957 he worked at the studio Soyuzmultfilm first as an animator and then as an art director with V. Y. Bordzilovsky, M. A. Botov and V. D. Degtyaryov and then from 1970 till 1991 as the director. He is one of the founders of "Studio 13" and worked there as a director during the period 1991–1994. He was also an organizer and founder of the film schools in Zee Institute of Creative Art (ZICA) in India (also a teacher and director in the period from 1995 to 1999) and Tarbiat Modares University in Iran from 2000 till 2004.

He has worked with artists M. S. Zherebchevsky, V. Peskov, N. I. Koshkin, S. P. Tyunin and others. He received the title Honored Artist of the RSFSR in 1989.

== Work ==
- Cowboys in the City, 1973
- Mirror of Time, (Зеркало времени), 1976
- Forward March, Time!, (Вперёд, Время!), 1977
- Contact (Контакт), 1978
- Shooting Range (Тир), 1979
- The Return (Возвращение), 1980
- Button (Пуговица), 1982
- Contract (Контракт), 1985
- The Pass (Перевал), 1988
- The 17th and 18th episodes of Nu, pogodi! (Ну, погоди!) (1993–94)
