= Golem (1979 film) =

1979 Polish film

- Promotional release poster
- Directed by: Piotr Szulkin
- Written by: Piotr Szulkin; Tadeusz Sobolewski
- Starring: Marek Walczewski; Krystyna Janda; Joanna Żółkowska
- Release date: 1979
- Running time: 92 minutes
- Country: Poland
- Language: Polish

Golem is a 1979 Polish science fiction film directed and co-written by Piotr Szulkin. Inspired by the titular being in Jewish folklore, as well as the 1915 novel The Golem by Austrian author Gustav Meyrink, the film takes place in a 21st-century dystopia and reimagines the golem as a genetic clone.
