= Slava Tsukerman =

Russian film director (1939–2026)

- Слава Цукерман
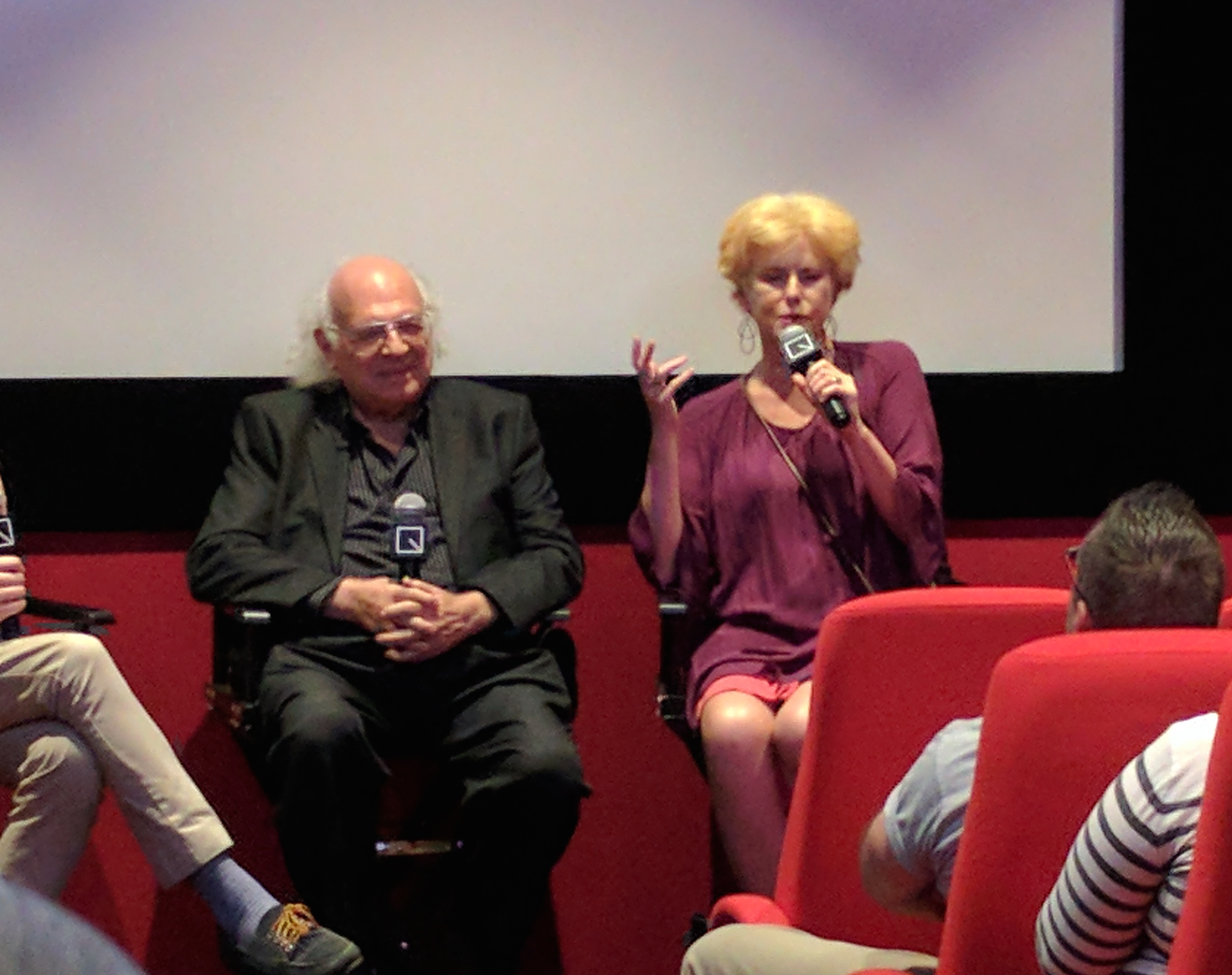
- Tsukerman (left) and Anne Carlisle at a screening of Liquid Sky at the Quad Cinema, New York City, in 2017
- Born: April 25, 1939; Moscow, Russian SFSR, USSR
- Died: February 28, 2026 (aged 86); New York City, U.S.
- Occupations: Film director; screenwriter; producer

Vladislav "Slava" Markovich Tsukerman (Russian: Владислав (Слава) Маркович Цукерман; April 25, 1939 – February 28, 2026) was a Russian film director, screenwriter and producer of Jewish origin. He was born in Moscow in the Soviet Union. In 1973 he emigrated with his wife Nina Kerova to Israel. In 1976 he moved to New York City. He is best known for producing, directing, and writing the screenplay for the 1982 cult film Liquid Sky. He also directed the 2004 documentary Stalin's Wife (about Nadezhda Alliluyeva) and the 2008 film Perestroika. He resided in New York City with his wife and producing partner Nina Kerova.

In 2014, Tsukerman confirmed in an interview with The Awl that a sequel to Liquid Sky titled Liquid Sky 2 was in the works. Lead actress Anne Carlisle would be returning in the sequel in the role of Margaret.

In the 1960s he studied at the Moscow Institute of Civil Engineering (MISI), where he began creating. Tsukerman made his first film at 21 years of age, titled I Believe in Spring. It was the first independent short fiction film in Soviet history. It won first prize at the All-Union Festival of Amateur Films in Moscow. It went on to win a prize at the Montreal World Film Festival. In the 1970s he immigrated to Israel and worked for Israeli television. There, he filmed a documentary titled Once Upon a Time There Were Russians in Jerusalem. The film won Best Documentary and Best Director at The World Television Film Festival in Hollywood.

Tsukerman died at his home in Manhattan on February 28, 2026, at the age of 86.

== Awards ==
- Gold Medal of VDNH (Highest Award of Soviet Industry)
- 1970 – Lomonosov Prize of the 1st degree (Highest award of the USSR Academy of Sciences)
- 1982 – Special Prize of the Jury – Montréal Film Festival – Liquid Sky
- 1983 – Special Jury Prize – Cartagena International Film Festival – Liquid Sky
- 1983 – Special Prize of the Jury – Brussels Film Festival (BRFF) – Liquid Sky
- 2001 – Best Directing – Kinotavr Film Festival – Poor Liza
