= Piotr Szulkin =

Polish film director and writer

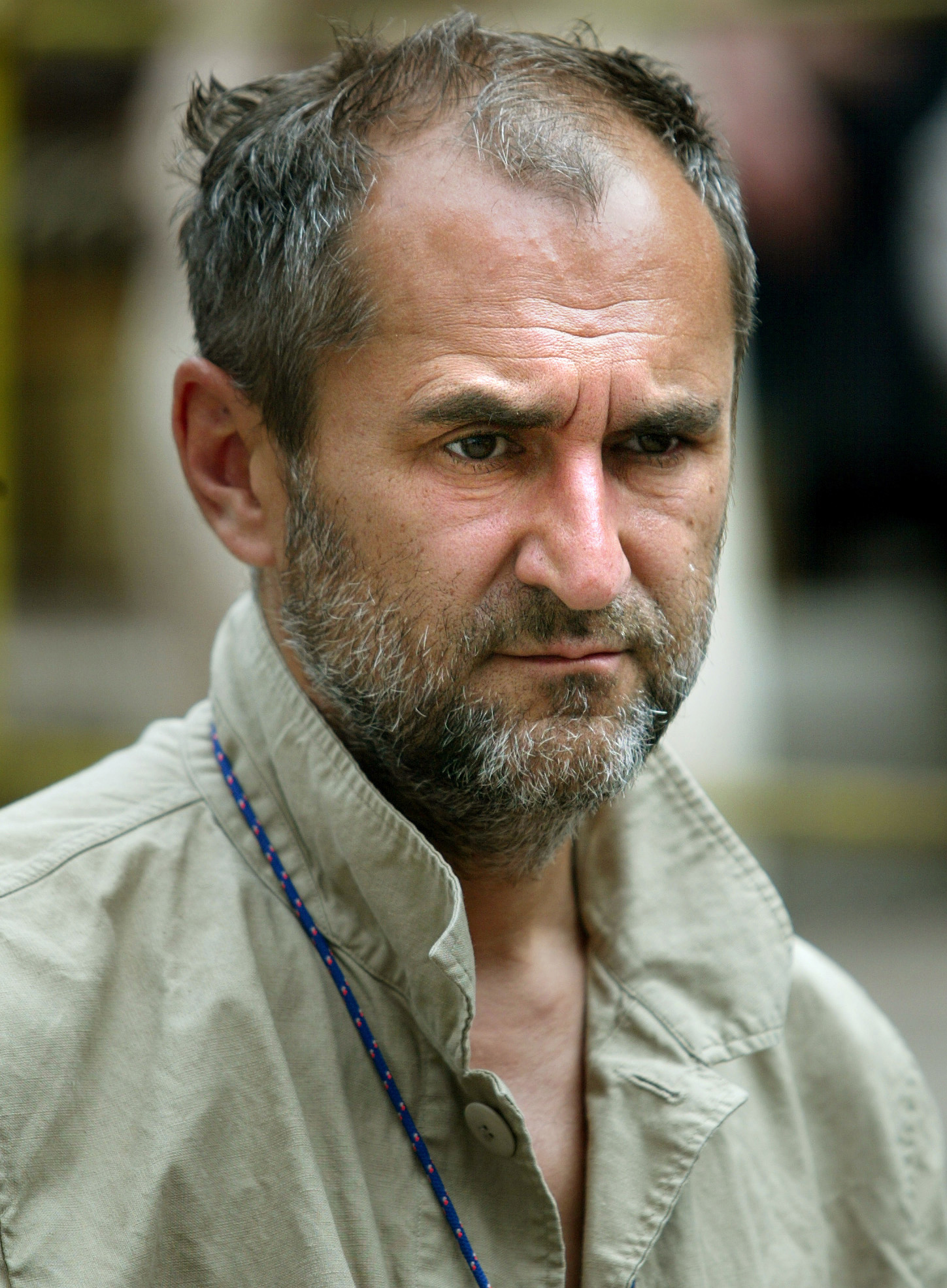
- Born: 26 April 1950; Gdańsk, Poland
- Died: 3 August 2018 (aged 68); Warsaw, Poland
- Occupations: Film director Screenwriter
- Years active: 1967-2003

Piotr Andrzej Szulkin (Polish pronunciation: [ˈpjɔtr ˈʂulkʲin]; 26 April 1950 – 3 August 2018) was a Polish film director and writer. He directed over thirty films, both Polish and international productions. He was a recipient of "Best Science Fiction Film Director" at Eurocon in 1984. During the latter part of his career, he was also a professor at the National Film School in Łódź.

== Personal life ==
He was the son of Paweł Szulkin (1911-1987), a Polish physicist from an assimilated Jewish family (whose parents were Idel Szulkin and Małka Frydzon). His paternal uncle was Michał Szulkin (1908-1992), a historian and publicist.

In 2013, Piotr Szulkin demanded the removal of information about the Jewish ancestry of Paweł Szulkin in his biography in the Polski Słownik Biograficzny (Polish National Dictionary). After Piotr Szulkin sued Polski Słownik Biograficzny, in January 2014, the Civil Court in Kraków, as a protective action, put a one-year prohibition on the dissemination of the volume of Polski Słownik Biograficzny including the biography of Paweł Szulkin.

Szulkin was married to Renata Karwowska.

== Films directed ==
- 1975 Dziewcę z ciortem
- 1977 Oczy uroczne
- 1978 Kobiety pracujące
- 1979 Golem
- 1981 Wojna światów – następne stulecie (The War of the Worlds: Next Century)
- 1984 O-Bi, O-Ba. Koniec cywilizacji
- 1985 Ga, Ga. Chwała bohaterom
- 1990 Femina
- 1993 Mięso (Ironica)
- 2003 Ubu Król

== Scripts written ==
- 1972 Raz, dwa, trzy
- 1972 Wszystko
- 1974 Przed kamerą SBB
- 1975 Zespół SBB
- 1975 Narodziny
- 1976 Życie codzienne
- 1977 Oczy uroczne
- 1980 Golem
- 1981 Wojna światów - Następne stulecie
- 1984 O-Bi, O-Ba. Koniec cywilizacji
- 1985 Ga, Ga. Chwała bohaterom
- 1993 Mięso (Ironica)
- 2003 Ubu Król

== Actor ==
- 1978 Szpital przemienienia (as Jakub)
- 1986 Kołysanka (Lullaby, A (The Lullabye)
- 1985 Képvadászok
- 1989 Lawa jako Diabeł I
- 1992 Kiedy rozum śpi
