= Anne Carlisle =

American actress

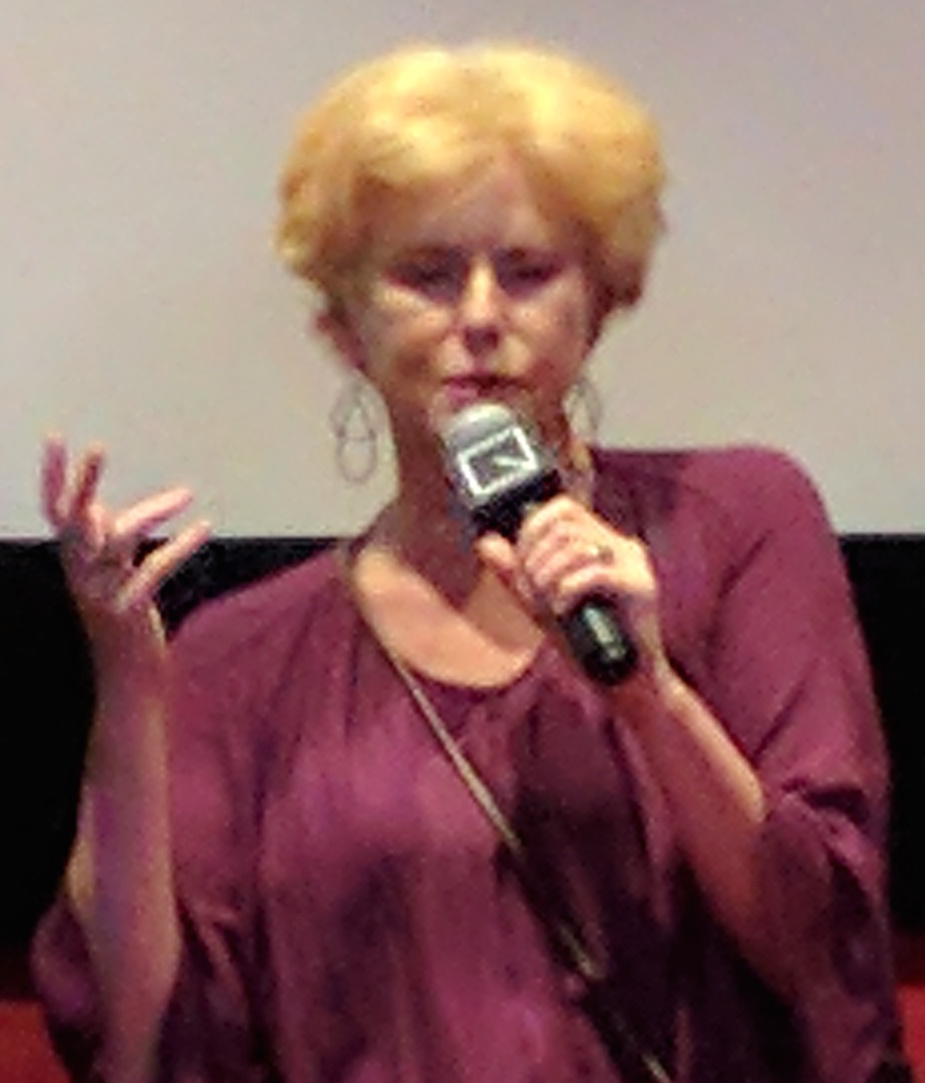
- Carlisle at a screening of Liquid Sky at the Quad Cinema, New York City, in 2017
- Born: 1956 (age 69–70); United States
- Occupations: Actress; writer; artist
- Years active: 1982–2000
- Spouse: Kenneth Master

Anne Carlisle (born 1956) is an American artist, actress, performance artist, acting teacher, author, and model.

== Career ==
Carlisle is known for co-writing and playing both the lead female and male counterpart roles in the 1982 cult, new wave film Liquid Sky. She also played a minor role of Victoria in the 1985 Susan Seidelman film Desperately Seeking Susan, the cross dresser prostitute Gwendoline in Crocodile Dundee and starred in an episode of TV series Miami Vice. Carlisle also adapted and wrote a novel version of Liquid Sky.

Carlisle posed for Playboy in 1984.

In 2014, in an interview with The Awl it was stated by Liquid Sky director Slava Tsukerman that a sequel, Liquid Sky 2, was in the works. Anne Carlisle would be returning in the sequel in the role of Margaret.

Carlisle has practiced as a fine artist for five decades, having studied under her mentor Reuben Hale at Palm Beach Community College (A.A. 1975) in Lake Worth, FL, then at the School of Visual Arts (B.F.A. 1979) in New York, NY, and then in the New York University, SEHNAP Art Therapy Program (M.A. 1995) in New York, NY. She currently has an art studio in Boynton Beach, FL, and is a founding member of the board of directors for The Artwork of Reuben Hale, a nonprofit in West Palm Beach, FL. Established in 2019, they plan to open the artist's former home to the community as a historic artist's studio and sculpture garden.

== Filmography ==
Anne Carlisle film and television credits
Year	Title	Role	Notes
1981	New York Beat Movie	Fashion show model	Film
1982	Liquid Sky	Margaret / Jimmy	Film
1984	Perfect Strangers	Sally	Film
1985	Desperately Seeking Susan	Victoria	Film
1986	Miami Vice	Lydia Sugarman	TV series, 1 episode: "Yankee Dollar"
1986	Crocodile Dundee	Gwendoline	Film
1987	The Equalizer	Advertiser	TV series, 1 episode: "A Place to Stay"
1988	The Suicide Club	Catherine	Film
1988	Bum Rap	Grace	Film
1988	Nick & Hillary	Kathy Watson	TV series, 1 episode
1990	High Score	Olympia	Film
2000	Downtown 81	Fashion show model	Film
