= The War of the Worlds: Next Century =

1983 Polish film

- Theatrical release poster
- Polish: Wojna światów – następne stulecie
- Directed by: Piotr Szulkin
- Written by: Piotr Szulkin
- Starring: Krystyna Janda; Jerzy Stuhr; Janusz Gojos; Bożena Dykiel; Zbigniew Buczkowski; Witold Pyrkosz; Stanisław Tym; Roman Wilhelmi
- Cinematography: Zygmunt Samosiuk
- Edited by: Elżbieta Kurkowska
- Music by: Jerzy Maksymiuk; Józef Skrzek
- Production company: Zespol Filmowy "Perspektywa"
- Distributed by: Asociace Ceských Filmových Klubu
- Release dates: September 11, 1981 (Gdańsk); February 20, 1983 (Poland)
- Running time: 92 minutes
- Country: Poland
- Language: Polish

The War of the Worlds: Next Century (Polish: Wojna światów – następne stulecie) is a 1981 Polish dystopian film written and directed by Piotr Szulkin. Although it was inspired by, including the title deriving from, H. G. Wells' The War of the Worlds, it is not an adaptation of the novel.

The story follows a news presenter called Iron Idem (Roman Wilhelmi) who is forced to assist in the agenda of the newly-invaded Martians. Krystyna Janda, Jerzy Stuhr, Janusz Gajos, Bożena Dykiel, Zbigniew Buczkowski, Witold Pyrkosz, and Stanisław Tym also star. The film premiered at the Gdańsk Film Festival on 11 September 1981, before releasing theatrically in Poland on 20 February 1983.

== Plot ==
The film starts with the arrival of a more advanced civilization from Mars which purports to have a friendly attitude towards Earthlings. The place visited by the Martians resembles a police state in which a huge role is played by television, which is used as a propaganda tool.

The film's protagonist, Iron Idem, is a news presenter for the TV program Iron Idem's Independent News. The stories that air on his program, though, are carefully chosen by Idem's boss; once the aliens arrive, the program quickly shifts its messaging to be overtly in favor of their presence. Not long after this, Idem wakes up one morning to find a group of police officers and aliens ransacking his apartment and kidnapping his wife in a body bag. He is forced to collaborate with the state apparatus, which is working together with blood-thirsty Martians to encourage people to donate blood.

After being thrown out of his flat, Idem has a chance to observe stupefied citizens who fall victim to the repression of the state apparatus. Finally, the main protagonist rebels and criticizes society during a TV Super Show which is a concert organized as a farewell to the Martians.

Later, Idem is sitting at an outdoor market when a local water supply worker recognizes him from his recent speech on television. The man says that Idem "failed to pull it off," referring to his poorly received criticism of the martians and the state response to their visit. He asks what more Idem needs aside from the current government, which provides "everything under a single pillar, a healthy climate, beer available." Jaded by this response and by his misinterpreted speech, Idem takes off his wig and gives it to the water supply worker's child, telling the young boy that tomorrow he will take Idem's place.

As he is leaving the market, Idem is stopped by the same old man who was trying to destroy the televisions earlier. He confides that he is going to blow up the local TV station, and asks Idem to help him get in, since he works for the station and has special access to its offices. The old man goes on to say that someone gave him explosives and encouraged him to carry out the job. Suspicious, Idem warns that the situation sounds like a set up. Sure enough, Idem is pulled into a car by presumably government workers, who make him watch as the old man is blown up. They assure him that the man will become an idol of resistance, memorialized in statue form, but Idem does not appear to be consoled.

One day after the Martians' departure, Earth's media outlets collectively change their depiction of events. The visit from the aliens is viewed as an aggressive invasion, and Iron Idem is depicted as the main collaborator. While on trial, Idem agrees to play his sensational television character up until his inevitable execution, in exchange for a chance to see his wife one last time. Idem's former employer agrees to this, and Idem's wife is delivered dead in the same bag her captors used to kidnap her. Finally, he is sentenced to death by firing squad. Idem is tied to a pole, and a television screen in the foreground indicates that the event is going to filmed for the public. However, when the firing squad aim and shoot their guns, it is only the version of Idem on the television screen who collapses dead; the Idem in front of the cameras, unscathed and conscious, appears amazed at his survival. He frees himself from the pole and leaves the television studio, stepping into an outside world obfuscated by light and mist.

== Cast ==
- Krystyna Janda as Gea
- Jerzy Stuhr as Attorney
- Janusz Gojos as Water Supply Worker
- Bożena Dykiel as Nurse
- Zbigniew Buczkowski as Policeman
- Witold Pyrkosz as Judge
- Stanisław Tym as Secret Agent
- Roman Wilhelmi as Iron Idem

== Release ==
The War of the Worlds: Next Century had its world premiere at the Gdańsk Film Festival on September 11, 1981. It was immediately banned by the Polish government upon its release because it depicted political parallels with the political context of the country at that time, and did not receive a theatrical release in Poland until 20 February 1983.
