= List of horror films of 1976 =

A list of horror films released in 1976.

Title	Director(s)	Cast	Country	Notes	Ref.
A*P*E	Paul Leder	Rod Arrants, Joanna Kerns	United States; South Korea		
Alice, Sweet Alice	Alfred Sole	Linda Miller, Paula Sheppard, Brooke Shields, Mildred Clinton	United States	Alternative titles: Communion; Holy Terror	
Blood Bath	Joel Reed	Harve Presnell, Doris Roberts, P. J. Soles	United States		
Blood Sucking Freaks	Joel Reed	Ernie Pysher, Viju Krem, Seamus O'Brien	United States		
Bloodlust	Marijan David Vajda	Werner Pochath	Switzerland		
Born for Hell	Denis Héroux	Mathieu Carrière, Debra Berger, Eva Mattes	Canada, West Germany, Italy, France	Alternative titles: Naked Massacre; Die Hinrichtung	
Burnt Offerings	Dan Curtis	Karen Black, Oliver Reed, Burgess Meredith	United States		
Carrie	Brian De Palma	Sissy Spacek, Piper Laurie, Amy Irving	United States		
The Clown Murders	Martyn Burke	Stephen Young, Lawrence Dane, John Candy	Canada		
Dark August	Martin Goldman	Kim Hunter, J. J. Barry	United States		
Death at Love House	E. W. Swackhamer	Robert Wagner, Kate Jackson	United States	Television film Alternative title(s): The Shrine of Lorna Love	
Death Machines	Paul Kyriazi	Mari Honjo, Ronald L. Marchini, Philip DeAngelo	United States		
Death Weekend	William Fruet	Brenda Vaccaro, Don Stroud, Chuck Shamata	Canada	Alternative title(s): The House by the Lake	
Dogs	Burt Brinckerhoff	David McCallum, Sandra McCabe, George Wyner	United States		
Dracula and Son, aka Dracula père et fils	Édouard Molinaro	Christopher Lee	France	horror-comedy	
Dr. Black, Mr. Hyde	William Crain	Bernie Casey, Rosalind Cash, Marie O'Henry	United States	Alternative title(s): The Watts Monster	
Drive-In Massacre	Stu Segall	John F. Goff, Steve Vincent, Douglas Gudbye	United States		
Eaten Alive	Tobe Hooper	Neville Brand, Mel Ferrer, Marilyn Burns	United States	Alternative title(s): Death Trap; Horror Hotel Massacre; Legend of the Bayou; Starlight Slaughter	
Embryo	Ralph Nelson	Rock Hudson, Barbara Carrera, Diane Ladd	United States		
The Food of the Gods	Bert I. Gordon	Marjoe Gortner, Pamela Franklin, Ralph Meeker, Ida Lupino	United States		
God Told Me To	Larry Cohen	Sylvia Sidney, Richard Lynch, Tony Lo Bianco	United States	Alternative title(s): Demon	
Grizzly	William Girdler	Mary Ann Hearn, Charles Kissinger, Joan McCall	United States		
Haunts	Herb Freed	May Britt, Cameron Mitchell	United States		
The House with Laughing Windows	Pupi Avati	Lino Capolicchio, Francesca Marciano	Italy		
Inquisition	Jacinto Molina	Juan Gallardo, Daniela Giordano	Spain		
Island of Death	Nico Mastorakis	Gerard Gonalons, Jessica Dublin, Nikos Tsachiridis	Greece	Alternative title(s): Devils in Mykonos; Ta paidia tou Diavolou; Killing Daylight; Children of Death	
J. D.'s Revenge	Arthur Marks	Glynn E. Turman, Joan Pringle, Carl Crudup	United States		
Jack the Ripper	Jesús Franco	Lina Romay, Klaus Kinski, Herbert Fux	Switzerland; West Germany		
The Keeper	T. Y. Drake	Christopher Lee, Tell Schreiber	Canada		
Land of the Minotaur	Kostas Karagiannis	Donald Pleasence, Jessica Dublin, Peter Cushing	Greece; United Kingdom; United States		
The Legend of the Wolf Woman	Rino Di Silvestro	Dagmar Lassander, Annik Borel, Tino Carraro	Italy		
The Little Girl Who Lives Down the Lane	Nicolas Gessner	Jodie Foster, Martin Sheen, Scott Jacoby	Canada; France		
Look What's Happened to Rosemary's Baby	Sam O'Steen	Stephen McHattie, Patty Duke, Ruth Gordon	United States	Television film	
Mansion of the Doomed	Michael Pataki	Richard Basehart, Gloria Grahame, Lance Henriksen	United States		
Massacre at Central High	Rene Daalder	Andrew Stevens, Robert Carradine, Kimberly Beck	United States		
Meatcleaver Massacre	Evan Lee	Christopher Lee	United States		
Nightmare in Badham County	John Llewellyn Moxey	Deborah Raffin, Lynne Moody, Chuck Connors, Fionnula Flanagan, Robert Reed, Tina Louise, Robert Reed, Della Reese, Lana Wood and Ralph Bellamy	United States	Television film	
Obsession	Brian De Palma	Cliff Robertson, Geneviève Bujold, John Lithgow	United States		
The Omen	Richard Donner	Gregory Peck, Lee Remick, David Warner	United States	First film of The Omen franchise	
The Premonition	Robert Schnitzer	Sharon Farrell, Edward Bell	United States		
The Rat Savior	Krsto Papić	Boris Festini, Zdenka Trach, Mirjana Majurec	Yugoslavia	Alternative titles: The Redeemer	
Rattlers	John McCauley	Elizabeth Guadalupe Chauvet, Sam Chew, Dan Priest	United States	Television film	
Sasquatch, the Legend of Bigfoot	Ed Ragozzino	George Lauris, Steve Boergadine, Jim Bradford	United States		
Satan's Slave	Norman J. Warren	Michael Gough, Martin Potter, Candace Glendenning	United Kingdom		
The Savage Bees	Guerdon Trueblood	Ben Johnson, Michael Parks, Gretchen Corbett	United States	Television film	
Savage Weekend	David Paulsen	Christopher Allport, David Gale, William Sanderson	United States		
Schizo	Pete Walker	Lynne Frederick, John Leyton	United Kingdom		
Shadow of the Hawk	George McCowan	Jan-Michael Vincent, Marilyn Hassett, Chief Dan George	United States; Canada		
Shogun's Sadism	Yūji Makiguchi	Yûsuke Kazato, Rena Uchimura	Japan	Alternative titles: The Joy of Torture 2: Oxen Split Torturing	
Snuff	Michael Findlay, Horacio Fredriksson, Simon Nuchtern	Margarita Amuchástegui, Aldo Mayo	Argentina; Canada; United States		
Squirm	Jeff Lieberman	Jean Sullivan, Don Scardino, Patricia Pearcy	United States		
The Tenant	Roman Polanski	Roman Polanski, Isabelle Adjani, Shelley Winters	France		
To the Devil a Daughter	Peter Sykes	Richard Widmark, Christopher Lee, Honor Blackman	West Germany; United Kingdom		
The Town That Dreaded Sundown	Charles B. Pierce	Ben Johnson, Andrew Prine, Dawn Wells	United States		
Track of the Moon Beast	Richard Ashe	Chase Cordell, Leigh Drake, Gregorio Sala	United States		
Who Can Kill a Child?	Narciso Ibáñez Serrador	Lewis Fiander, Prunella Ransome	Spain	Alternative title(s): Island of the Damned; Lucifer's Curse; Death is Child's Play; Would You Kill a Child?	
The Witch Who Came from the Sea	Matt Cimber	Millie Perkins, Lonny Chapman, Vanessa Brown	United States		

== Sources ==
- Albright, Brian (2012). Regional Horror Films, 1958-1990: A State-by-State Guide with Interviews. Jefferson, North Carolina: McFarland. ISBN 978-1-476-60042-0.
- Chibnall, Steve; Petley, Julian, eds. (2002). British Horror Cinema. New York City, New York: Routledge. ISBN 978-0-415-23003-2.
- Deal, David (2007). Television Fright Films of the 1970s. Jefferson, North Carolina: McFarland. ISBN 978-0-786-42929-5.
- Hardy, Phil, ed. (1995). The Overlook Film Encyclopedia. Vol. 3. Overlook Press. ISBN 0-87951-624-0.
- Hawkins, Joan (2000). Cutting edge: art-horror and the horrific avant-garde. University of Minnesota Press. ISBN 0-8166-3413-0.
- Muir, John Kenneth (2007). Horror Films of the 1970s. Jefferson, North Carolina: McFarland. ISBN 978-0-786-49156-8.
- Murguía, Salvador Jimenez, ed. (2016). The Encyclopedia of Japanese Horror Films. Lanham, Maryland: Rowman and Littlefield. ISBN 978-1-442-26167-9.
- Stanley, John (1988). Revenge of the Creature Features Movie Guide: An A to Z Encyclopedia to the Cinema of the Fantastic, or, Is There a Mad Doctor In the House?. Pacifica, California: Creatures at Large Press. ISBN 0-940064-04-9.
- Stanley, John (2000). Creature Features: The Science Fiction, Fantasy, and Horror Movie Guide. New York: Berkley Boulevard Books. ISBN 978-0-425-17517-0.
- Stine, Scott Aaron (2015). The Gorehound's Guide to Splatter Films of the 1960s and 1970s. Jefferson, North Carolina: McFarland. ISBN 978-0-786-49140-7.
- Young, R. G. (2000). The Encyclopedia of Fantastic Film: Ali Baba to Zombies. New York City: Hal Leonard Corporation. ISBN 1-55783-269-2.
