= Elvis and Me =

Book by Priscilla Presley

Elvis and Me: The True Story of the Love Between Priscilla Presley and the King of Rock N' Roll
- Author: Priscilla Presley; Sandra Harmon
- Language: English
- Publisher: Berkley
- Publication date: 1985
- Publication place: United States
- Pages: 320 p.
- ISBN: 978-0425091036
- LC Class: ML420.P96 P68

Elvis and Me: The True Story of the Love Between Priscilla Presley and the King of Rock N' Roll is a 1985 memoir written by Priscilla Presley, with Sandra Harmon. In the book, Priscilla talks about meeting Elvis Presley, their marriage, and the factors and issues that led to the couple's divorce.

The book adaptation rights were purchased in 1987. In 1988, the book was adapted into the two-part ABC miniseries Elvis and Me, written by Joyce Eliason and directed by Larry Peerce; it stars Dale Midkiff as Elvis and Susan Walters as Priscilla. In 2023, a film adaptation, Priscilla, written and directed by Sofia Coppola, was released; Priscilla executive produced the film, and Cailee Spaeny stars in the title role, alongside Jacob Elordi as Elvis.

== Elements in the story ==
=== Memphis: Elvis' family and Graceland ===
Priscilla wrote that Elvis did not approve of his father’s relationship with divorcee Dee Stanley and did not attend their wedding. After the marriage, Elvis bought a home on Dolan Drive in Memphis, Tennessee, where his father, Vernon, and his new wife resided. On the rare occasions that Dee Stanley-Presley came to Graceland, Elvis did his best to be civil towards his stepmother.

Priscilla describes how her father reluctantly allowed her to live in Memphis, Tennessee to be near Elvis. The initial arrangement was that Priscilla would live with Vernon and Dee, while attending a Memphis Catholic school. Contrary to this arrangement, however, Priscilla gradually moved in with Elvis.

=== The nights with Elvis ===
Priscilla's descriptions of the nights she spent with Elvis, before their marriage, suggest that the star was not overtly sexual towards her. The couple kissed and engaged in petting, but Elvis always stopped the make-out sessions, before it led to actual intercourse.

While describing a "cleansing period" in Elvis's life, Priscilla claims that "any sexual temptations were against everything he was striving for, and he did not wish to betray me, the girl waiting for him, at home, who was preparing to be his wife."

According to her account, Elvis told Priscilla that they had to wait until they were married, before having sex. He said, "I'm not saying we can't do other things. It's just the actual encounter. I want to save it." Priscilla adds, "Fearful of not pleasing him—of destroying my image as his little girl—I resigned myself to the long wait. Instead of consummating our love in the usual way, he began teaching me other means of pleasing him. We had a strong connection, much of it sexual. The two of us created some exciting and wild times."

=== Daily life with Elvis ===
Priscilla notes that prescription drugs were present, from the first time she visited Elvis in America. He took placidyls, to get to sleep, in ever-increasing doses. Elvis would wake up at his normal time, which was around 4:00 in the afternoon, but for a few hours, he would be groggy and irritable, from the heavy dose of pills. He then began taking Dexedrine, in order to wake up.

Elvis liked old movie classics revolving around family or struggles to survive in the world. Les Misérables, Wuthering Heights, It's a Wonderful Life, Mr. Skeffington, Miracle on 34th Street, Letter from an Unknown Woman and The Way of All Flesh, the story of a self-sacrificing father, were among his favorites.

Priscilla also describes several episodes involving Elvis' explosive temper and his jealous nature, including the time he went into a rage and threatened to fire a male employee (Memphis Mafia member Jerry Schilling), who, supposedly, acted too "friendly" with Priscilla.

=== Affairs with other women ===
Conversely, she writes about Presley's double standard for his own behavior. His promiscuity with other women led to several confrontations. Priscilla says she was aware he had been dating Anita Wood, a girl from Memphis, Tennessee, when they first met in Germany and that he had continued the relationship for nearly two years, following his discharge from the Army. When he asked Priscilla to move to Memphis, Tennessee, he told her the relationship with Wood was over, but she describes, later, finding a packet of love letters from Wood in the attic at Graceland. However, according to Elvis's own words, he did not have sex with Anita Wood the whole four years he was with her. "Just to a point," he said, "then I stopped. It was difficult for her too, but that's just how I feel."

Presley admitted he had a number of affairs with some of the women who co-starred in his films, but all the relationships were before he met Priscilla and "meant nothing." Nevertheless, she understood these affairs were going on, while he was professing love to Anita Wood.

In a televised interview on January 14, 2005, with Larry King on CNN's Larry King Live, Anita Wood said that following media reports of a girlfriend in Germany, Elvis "had me believing that she (Priscilla) was just a friend, that daddy was in the Army with him, and there was nothing to it, whatsoever."

Priscilla also writes of other times she became suspicious of Elvis' infidelity. One such time was when Elvis released "(Marie's the Name) His Latest Flame"; Priscilla wondered, at that time, if Elvis was dating a girl named Marie.

=== The Ann-Margret affair ===
Of the many women involved with Elvis, the one whom Priscilla felt that her relationship with Elvis was most threatened by, was actress/singer Ann-Margret, who co-starred with Elvis in the film Viva Las Vegas. In her book, Priscilla devotes four pages to the subject (175 to 178). There was a lot of publicity about a romance between Elvis and Ann-Margret, during the 1963 filming and in the following weeks, when Elvis returned to record music and prepare for his next film. Despite his denials of an affair, Priscilla went to Los Angeles and stayed with him. Aware Priscilla was there, Ann-Margret took matters into her own hands and suddenly announced to the Los Angeles press that she was engaged to Elvis Presley. The news was picked up by every major newspaper in America, and Elvis informed Priscilla that he and Colonel Tom Parker thought it best for her to "go back to Memphis, till it calms down." Outraged, Priscilla picked up a vase and hurled it across the room, screaming that Ann-Margret should "keep her ass in Sweden, where she belongs." Desperate to please him, however, she went back to Graceland the next day. Elvis returned two weeks later, and admitted to the affair, but he promised it was over. Of all the movie stars Elvis Presley worked with, Ann-Margret was the only one to attend his funeral.

The very next line of Priscilla's book says that after the Ann-Margret ordeal, she soon suspected there were other women. She began traveling with him, but says she would still "get crazed with worry." She was afraid that the moment she was away from him, another woman could slip in. Priscilla relates how her insecurities would lead her to imitate the other woman's appearance (changing her clothes, hairstyle, and makeup), to hopefully please him.

If she forcefully challenged Presley on her suspicions, he would threaten to send her home to her parents. One such confrontation (over Shelley Fabares, another Presley film co-star) led to a screaming match, where he told her to get out. With her bags packed and a chauffeur ready to take her to the airport, Elvis changed his mind, at the last minute, and she willingly stayed. (In the TV movie, the confrontation was portrayed over the Ann-Margret affair, not over Fabares, as written in the book).

Priscilla writes that it was years later before she realized his tactics were part of a need to control her. This pattern began, before they were married, but in her 2005 made-for-television documentary, titled Elvis by the Presleys, she admitted that during their marriage, he had affairs with other women.

=== The Beatles' shadow, mysticism, and drugs ===
By 1965, the Beatles had overwhelmed the music industry, and Presley's record sales declined noticeably. Uncertain about who he was and where his career was going, Elvis turned to spiritualism, dragging an uninterested Priscilla with him. He had not performed live for several years and labeled most of his movies a joke. By the time filming was to begin on Clambake (released 1967), Presley's growing distress with the quality of his films led to a despondency, accompanied by overeating, and his normal 170 pound (77 kg) weight ballooned to 200 lb (91 kg). The movie studio ordered him to lose the weight quickly, marking the introduction of diet pills to the already excessive regimen of placidyls and Dexedrine, which would eventually kill him.

In his search for a "higher state of consciousness," Presley became fascinated with the occult and metaphysical phenomena. During his spiritual quest, everyone around them saw Presley's personality change, dramatically, from vibrant and playful to passive and introverted. Presley went through a period of celibacy, in keeping with the teachings of an Indian guru. "He was going through a cleansing period, physically and spiritually. He loved me and deeply wanted to be faithful to me, but he never felt certain that he could resist temptation. It was a persistent battle, and it even got to the point where he felt he had to resist me." For the next few weeks, Elvis felt the need to withdraw himself from the temptations of sex. He said, "We have to control our desires, so they don't control us. If we can control sex, then we can master all other desires." When they were in bed, "he took his usual dose of sleeping pills, handed me mine, and then, fighting off drowsiness, from the pills, pored over his metaphysical books." Priscilla was not interested, and she recalled Elvis saying, "Things will never work out, between us, Cilla, because you don't show any interest in me or my philosophies."

When this phase of his life passed, she and Elvis had a bonfire and burned the stacks of magazines and books he had accumulated on the subject. They tried marijuana, during this time, but they did not like it, as it made them ravenously hungry. Although Presley abhorred street drugs, Priscilla tells how they used LSD. While they both thought it had been an "extraordinary experience," they were afraid of it and experimented, with that specific drug, only once.

=== Marriage, family, and the Nancy Sinatra factor ===
Elvis and Priscilla were married on May 1, 1967, in Las Vegas, Nevada. She wrote that being called "Mrs. Elvis Presley" sounded better than live-in Lolita, teen heartthrob or the other labels given her in the past by some of the press. After the wedding ceremony, Frank Sinatra's private jet flew them to their Palm Springs, California home. Being the romantic that he was, Elvis carried his new bride across the threshold singing "The Hawaiian Wedding Song", then carried her straight to the bedroom.

After a second wedding reception at Graceland for friends and Memphis locals, Elvis and Priscilla went to his ranch near Horn Lake, Mississippi, where they locked themselves away for several days of much needed privacy. However, the press and the curious lined a fence on the property's perimeter and stood on the tops of cars to take photos.

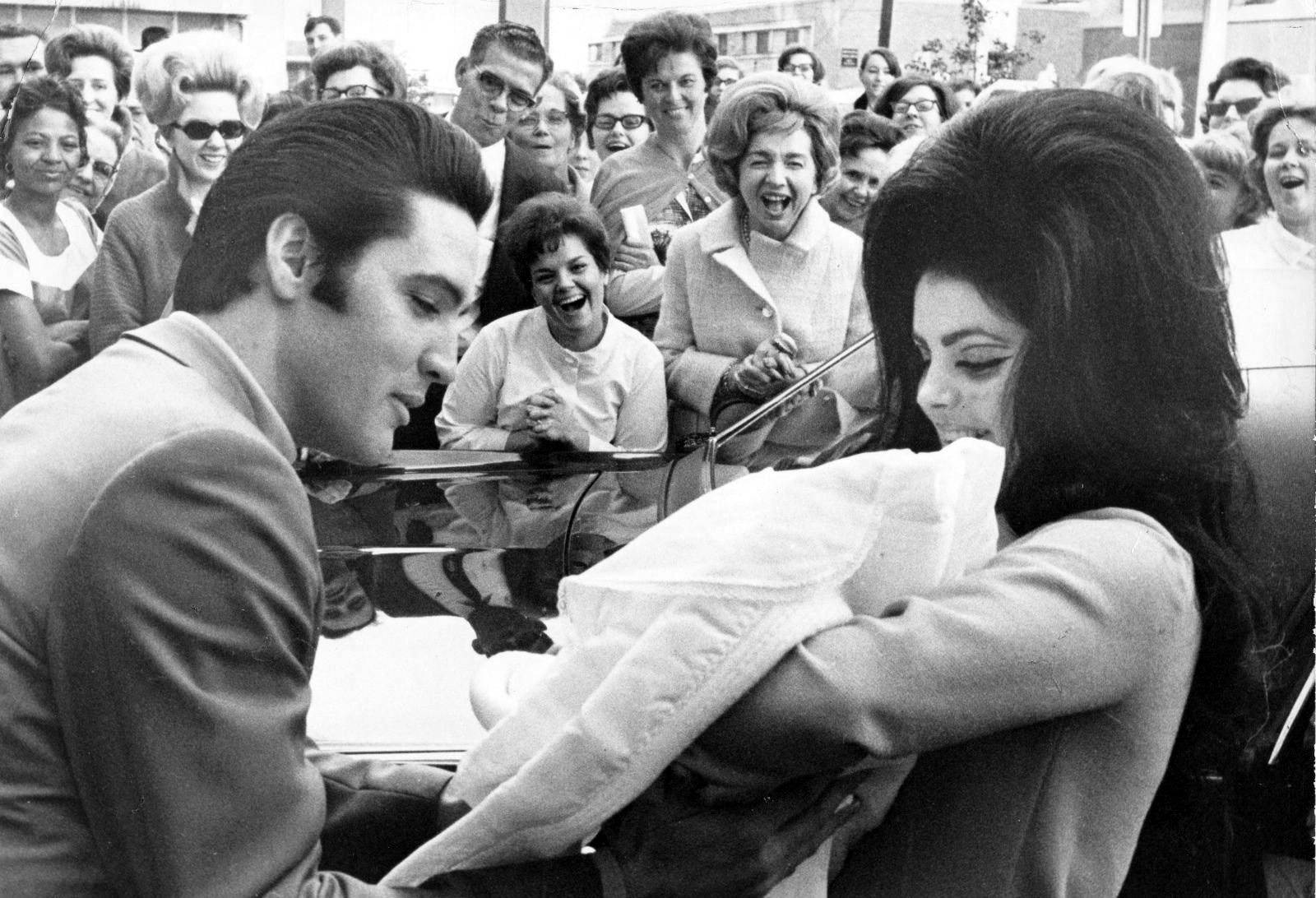
Elvis Presley and Priscilla with newborn Lisa Marie in February 1968

While they planned on having children, Elvis and Priscilla had hoped to wait awhile, and Priscilla was not prepared for her pregnancy. She considered an abortion, in part because Elvis had made derogatory comments in the past about "women using pregnancy as an excuse to let themselves go." Feeling insecure, she dieted to the point that by the time she gave birth, she then weighed less than she had before becoming pregnant. During Priscilla's pregnancy, she and Elvis had sex passionately until she began hearing rumors about Elvis and Nancy Sinatra, his co-star in the film Speedway. When Priscilla confronted Elvis about the stories, he dismissed them out of hand, telling her she was being overly sensitive due to her "condition" (pregnancy). However, six months into her pregnancy, Nancy Sinatra telephoned Priscilla and said she wanted to give her a baby shower. Priscilla was apprehensive about such a request coming from a woman she hardly knew, but Elvis convinced her to accept the offer. Priscilla went along with it and she and Sinatra got along well together. Everything seemed fine until a week or so later, when Elvis informed Priscilla that he needed time to think and wanted a trial separation. Devastated, she told him: "You've got it. Just tell me when to leave." She lived in agony for days, and Elvis silently changed his mind about the separation proposal. Two months later, their daughter Lisa Marie was born in Memphis on February 1, 1968.

=== The '68 Comeback Special to the end ===
Free to shape his own career, after the MGM motion picture contract expired in 1968, although still required to complete two more films, Presley accepted an offer from the NBC network to do a television special. NBC executives offered "open development,” along with a young director named Steve Binder, who was receptive to presenting Presley in a way that he could be himself. Elvis Presley's '68 Comeback Special was an enormous success, being the highest-rated television special of the year, and his closing song, titled, “If I Can Dream,” became his first million-selling record in several years.

The television special motivated Elvis, and he began recording at the American Sound Studios in Memphis, Tennessee, which was owned by Chips Moman. Filled with new energy, he recorded so many songs that RCA Records needed a year and a half to release them all. Included in these sessions were hits such as "Suspicious Minds,” which went to number one on the Billboard Charts, along with "In the Ghetto" and "Kentucky Rain." He was signed on to perform, for a month, at the then-new and just-completed International Hotel in Las Vegas. Every show was sold out, with thousands being turned away at the door. This success led to a five-year contract for appearances, twice a year, with the largest fee ever paid to any singer in history. Unfortunately, his renewed popularity brought a large increase in the number of death threats, requiring a significant increase in personal security.

After years of personal unhappiness, due to the state of his career, for a time, his triumphant return to a live stage brought new vitality to their marriage. However, the renewed stardom, with regular touring around the United States and appearances in Las Vegas, meant he was away from his family more, and his pattern of infidelity returned. When Elvis suggested Priscilla cut back on her visits to see him, it only added to her anxieties. Things grew worse, when she returned to their Palm Springs home and found a number of letters from girls showing they had obviously been there.

Priscilla Presley admits she had two affairs of her own, and by 1972, the tumultuous marriage was irreparably broken down. The last straw, for Priscilla, came when Elvis, possibly having learned of the second affair with her karate instructor, Mike Stone, had rough sex with her in his Las Vegas hotel room, telling her, "This is how a real man makes love to a woman." Also, during this time, Elvis considered hiring a hit man to kill Stone, but ultimately did not follow through with the idea.

Separated on February 23, 1972, the Presleys divorced, amicably, on October 9, 1973, mutually agreeing to share custody of their daughter, Lisa Marie. Elvis had made another televised special, called Elvis: Aloha from Hawaii, in January 1973, but after not seeing him for several months, prior to the actual court hearing, Priscilla was bewildered by his physical appearance. She remarked on how swollen his hands were, when she held them in hers. Less than four years later, Elvis died. After his death, his father, Vernon, agreed to have Elvis's body reburied, to deter thieves.

== Critical reception ==
The Los Angeles Times's Robert Hilburn wrote a critical review of the memoir, concluding: "Priscilla's intent here no doubt was to share her love for her late husband, but the book is little more than a carnival curio in what has become the sideshow called Elvis. The larger question raised by the book is the obligation survivors have to famous loved ones. One rule of thumb may be this paraphrase on the old saw: 'If you can't say anything significant, don't say anything at all.'"

Broox Sledge of the Enterprise-Journal wrote that, "If Elvis is your idol, perhaps you would be happier not reading Elvis and Me [...] Priscilla has taken her late husband and presented him to the world, warts and all. Some of the warts are attractive. Some are splotchy." In her review of the book for the Tallahassee Democrat, Dannye Romine discussed the concept of Peter Pan syndrome, opining that, "Peter Pan Presley was clearly an emotionally impetuous man-child who never grew up and Priscilla was oh-such-an adoring Wendy who never encouraged him to grow up."

== Influence ==
The song "Personal Jesus" by Depeche Mode was inspired by Elvis and Me.

"It's about how Elvis was her [Priscilla Presley's] man and her mentor and how often that happens in love relationships," [Martin] Gore said. "How everybody's heart is like a god in some way."

— "Personal Jesus", Rolling Stone, archived from the original on October 16, 2007

== Adaptations ==
Elvis and Me was adapted into the 1988 two-part made-for-television miniseries of the same name. Written by Joyce Eliason and directed by Larry Peerce, the miniseries stars Dale Midkiff as Elvis and Susan Walters as Priscilla. The miniseries premiered on ABC in February 1988.

In 2022, it was announced that Sofia Coppola would direct a film adaptation of the memoir, starring Cailee Spaeny as Priscilla and Jacob Elordi as Elvis. The film, titled Priscilla, premiered at the 80th Venice International Film Festival on September 4, 2023. It received a limited theatrical release in the US by A24 on October 27, 2023, followed by a wide release on November 3. Priscilla served as executive producer on the film.
