= All My Sons (film) =

1948 film by Irving Reis

- Theatrical release poster
- Directed by: Irving Reis
- Screenplay by: Chester Erskine
- Based on: the play All My Sons by Arthur Miller
- Produced by: Chester Erskine
- Starring: Edward G. Robinson; Burt Lancaster; Louisa Horton; Mady Christians
- Cinematography: Russell Metty
- Edited by: Ralph Dawson
- Music by: Leith Stevens
- Production company: Universal-International Pictures
- Distributed by: Universal-International Pictures
- Release date: May 1948
- Running time: 94 minutes
- Country: United States
- Language: English
- Budget: $2 million

All My Sons is a 1948 film noir drama directed by Irving Reis and starring Edward G. Robinson and Burt Lancaster. The supporting cast features Louisa Horton, Mady Christians, Howard Duff, Arlene Francis, and Harry Morgan. The film is based on Arthur Miller's 1946 play of the same name. It was produced and distributed by Universal Pictures.

== Plot ==
Joe Keller is sorry to hear son Chris plans to wed Ann Deever and move to Chicago, for he hoped Chris would someday take over the manufacturing business Joe built from the ground up.

Ann's father Herb was Joe's business partner, but when both men were charged with shipping defective airplane parts that resulted in wartime crashes and deaths, only Herb was convicted and sent to prison.

Another son of the Kellers' is in the Army air corps, missing in action and presumed dead. Ann used to be engaged to him and her engagement to his brother upsets Kate Keller, who hasn't yet accepted that son Larry is gone for good.

Ann's attorney brother George strongly discourages her from marrying a Keller, and many in town still whisper that Joe was responsible for the death of twenty-one pilots. A war widow even calls Joe a murderer to his face in a restaurant.

On a visit to Ann's father in prison, Chris hears how Joe called in sick on the one day the Army came to pick up the airplane parts. Joe admits to Chris that he knew they were defective, but repairs would have been costly and could have bankrupted the business. Chris strikes his father in anger at hearing this.

A letter from Larry reveals that he knew of his father's guilt and intended to go on a suicide mission in a plane, no longer wanting to live with the family's shame. This is the final disgrace for Joe, who shoots himself. Chris and Ann leave together with Kate's blessing to their future.

== Cast ==
- Edward G. Robinson as Joe Keller
- Burt Lancaster as Chris Keller
- Louisa Horton as Ann Deever
- Mady Christians as Kate Keller
- Frank Conroy as Herb Deever
- Howard Duff as George Deever
- Lloyd Gough as Jim Bayliss
- Arlene Francis as Sue Bayliss
- Harry Morgan as Frank Lubey
- Elisabeth Fraser as Lydia Lubey
- Jerry Hausner as Halliday
- William Ruhl as Ed
- Herbert Heywood as McGraw
- Herb Vigran as Wertheimer
- Charles Meredith as Ellsworth
- Walter Soderling as Charles
- Pat Flaherty as Bartender
- Harry Harvey as Judge

== Production ==
Reportedly Burt Lancaster postponed his own first production, Kiss the Blood Off My Hands in order to take the role of Chris, an ex-GI who initially idolizes his father, not knowing what he has done.

== Reception ==
=== Box Office ===
The film made a relatively small loss for Universal.

=== Critical response ===
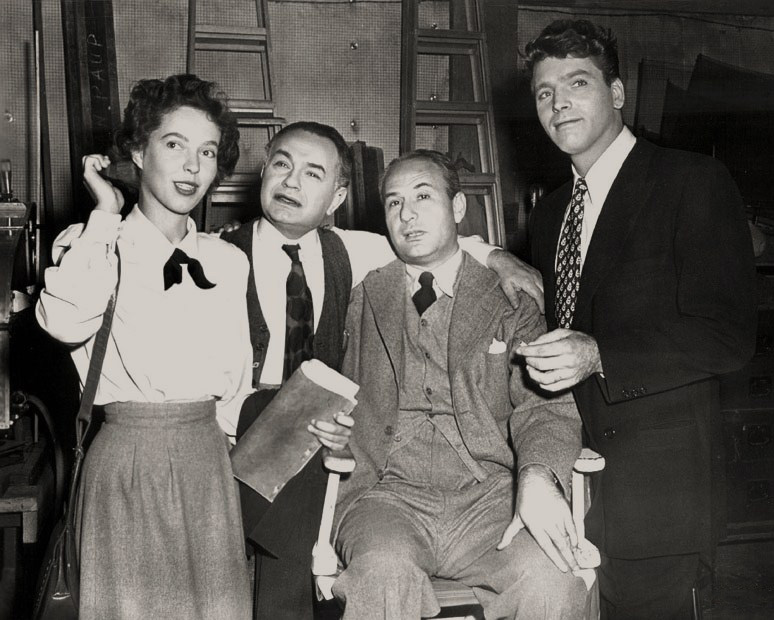
Louisa Horton, Edward G. Robinson, Chester Erskine and Burt Lancaster, 1948

In his film review, critic Bosley Crowther contrasted Arthur Miller's play to the screenplay. While stating that the screenplay was more restrained, he praised the acting. He wrote, "In the role of this rugged individualist, Mr. Robinson does a superior job of showing the shades of personality in a little tough guy who has a softer side. Arrogant, ruthless, and dynamic in those moments when his 'business' is at stake, he is also tender and considerate in the presence of those he loves ... As the right-thinking son of this corrupt man, Burt Lancaster is surprisingly good and, although he appears a bit dim-witted at times, that is not implausible. Louisa Horton is natural as his sweetheart and Mady Christians plays the mother intensely. Irving Reis' direction is slightly stilted in some scenes but generally matches the tempo of a fluid script". Critic and writer James Agee writing in The Nation in 1948 characterized it as "A feast for the self-righteous; Ibsen for beginners; for the morally curious a sad bore. By the standards of the Screen Writers' Guild this sort of thing is the white hope of Hollywood. Entirely well-intended and sincerely acted; but not an interesting play, and certainly not a movie." Pauline Kael wrote: "Arthur Miller conceived this idea-ridden melodrama ... Surprisingly, it does work up some energy, but by then you have to be a little saintly to care." Leonard Maltin gave it three of four stars: "Post-WW2 drama is well acted, but verbose and preachy." Leslie Halliwell gave it one of four stars: "Heady family melodrama from a taut and topical stage play. The film is well-meaning but artificial and unconvincing."

=== Accolades ===
Nominations

- Writers Guild of America Award: Best Written American Drama – Chester Erskine; The Robert Meltzer Award (Screenplay Dealing Most Ably with Problems of the American Scene) – Chester Erskine; 1949.

== Bibliography ==
- Fetrow, Alan G. Feature Films, 1940-1949: a United States Filmography. McFarland, 1994.
