= Anne Haney =

American actress (1934–2001)

- Born: Anne Ryan Thomas; March 4, 1934; Memphis, Tennessee, U.S.
- Died: May 26, 2001 (aged 67); Studio City, California, U.S.
- Other names: Anne T. Haney; Ann Harvey
- Education: University of North Carolina at Chapel Hill (BA)
- Occupation: Actress
- Years active: 1970–2001
- Spouse: John Haney (m. 1957; died 1980)
- Children: 1

Anne Ryan Haney (née Thomas; March 4, 1934 – May 26, 2001) was an American character actress. She appeared in small supporting roles in around 50 film and television productions and was best known for her roles as Mrs. Sellner in Mrs. Doubtfire, Mrs. Chapil in The American President and Greta in Liar Liar.

== Early years ==
Haney was born to Robert Lee and Dorothy Margaret Thomas on March 4, 1934, in Memphis, Tennessee. She attended East High School and Southwestern at Memphis before earning her Bachelor of Arts from University of North Carolina at Chapel Hill.

== Career ==
Haney began acting in 1970, appearing in commercials and in local theatrical productions in Atlanta, Jacksonville, and Norfolk, Virginia.

Haney appeared in the Star Trek: The Next Generation episode "The Survivors" as Rishon Uxbridge, and later appeared as a Bajoran arbitrator in the Star Trek: Deep Space Nine episode "Dax". She was a regular guest-star during the syndicated run of Mama's Family, playing Alberta Meechum, the nemesis of Thelma Harper. On Our House she played fussy neighbour Virginia Taft. She was also a recurring cast member of L.A. Law, playing Judge Marilyn Travelini. Haney guest starred on Benson, Cheers, Designing Women, The Golden Girls, Charmed, Boy Meets World, Columbo, ER, NYPD Blue, Curb Your Enthusiasm and Ally McBeal. She also appeared in the television movies LBJ: The Early Years (1987) and Elvis and Me (1988).

Haney also became known for a number of film appearances. In 1993, she was cast as Mrs. Sellner, a family court supervisor in Mrs. Doubtfire. In 1995, she appeared as Mrs. Chapil in The American President. In 1997, she played Greta in Liar Liar. In 1999, she appeared in Forces of Nature and The Out-of-Towners.

== Personal life ==
She was married to John Haney, a public television executive whom she met at the University of North Carolina at Chapel Hill, where she had been studying drama, radio, and television. They were married from November 30, 1957, until his death on April 9, 1980; the marriage produced one daughter. As for her reason for coming to Hollywood, she said, "My husband died, my daughter went to college, the dog got fleas, and the maid quit. So I had to come to Hollywood.”

== Death ==
Haney died of congestive heart failure, aged 67, at her home in Studio City, Los Angeles, California on May 26, 2001.

== Selected filmography ==
- Summer of My German Soldier (1978) – Mrs. Benn
- Hopscotch (1980) – Mrs. Myerson
- The Night the Lights Went Out in Georgia (1981) – Waitress
- The Children Nobody Wanted (1981, made-for-television) – Mrs. Lightheart
- Making Love (1982) – Lila
- Some Kind of Hero (1982) – Monica Lewis
- Frances (1982) – Hairdresser
- Cheers (1982) – Miss Gilder
- The Osterman Weekend (1983) – Honeymoon Bride
- Benson (1984) – Nun
- Impulse (1984) – Mrs. Piersall
- The Night They Saved Christmas (1984) – Hedda
- St. Elsewhere (1984) – Mrs. Clifford
- The Bad Seed (1985) – Alice Fern
- Lime Street (1985) – Evelyn Camp
- Malice in Wonderland (1985) – Dema's Secretary
- Mr. Belvedere (1985, Episode "Sweet Charity") – Molly
- The Best of Times (1986) – Marcy
- The Golden Girls (1986) – Bonnie
- Blind Justice (1986) – Jim's mother
- The Twilight Zone (1986, Episode "The Toys of Caliban") – Mary Ross
- Mama's Family (1986–1989) – Alberta Meechum
- LBJ: The Early Years (1987) – Rebekah Baines Johnson
- Cold Steel (1987) – Anna Modine
- Our House (1988) – Virginia Taft
- Elvis and Me (1988) – Grandma Minnie Mae Presley
- Beauty and the Beast Episode "Dead of Winter" (1988) - Tamara
- Star Trek: The Next Generation (1989) – Rishon Uxbridge
- Who's the Boss (1989, Episode "To Tony, With Love") – Mrs. Bunch
- Columbo (1990, Episode "Agenda For Murder") – Louise
- Quantum Leap (1991, Episode "A Single Drop of Rain") – Grace Beaumont
- LA Law (1992) – Judge Marilyn Travelini
- Northern Exposure (1992) – Judge Elizabeth Percy
- The Golden Palace (1992) – Vivian
- Star Trek: Deep Space Nine (1993) – Renora
- Mrs. Doubtfire (1993) – Mrs. Sellner
- ER (1994) - Mrs Packer
- The American President (1995) – Mrs. Chapil
- Mother (1996) – Helen
- NYPD Blue (1996, Episode "Head Case") – Mrs. Reese
- Liar Liar (1997) – Greta
- Changing Habits (1997) – Sister Humiliata
- Midnight in the Garden of Good and Evil (1997) – Margaret Williams
- The Lesser Evil (1998) – Derek's Mother
- Psycho (1998) – Mrs. Chambers
- Forces of Nature (1999) – Emma
- The Out-of-Towners (1999) – Woman in Bathroom
- Charmed (2000, Episode "How to Make a Quilt Out of Americans") – Aunt Gail
- Curb Your Enthusiasm (2000, Episode "Ted and Mary") – Mary's Mother (final appearance)
