= Louisa Horton =

American actress

Louisa Horton Hill
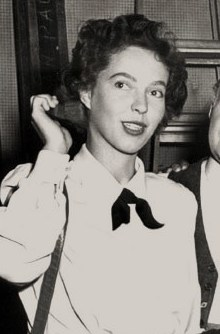
- Horton in 1948
- Born: Louisa Horton; September 20, 1920; Beijing, China
- Died: January 25, 2008 (aged 87); Englewood, New Jersey, U.S.
- Occupation: Actress
- Years active: 1948–2005
- Spouse: George Roy Hill (m. 1951; div. 1971)
- Children: 4

Louisa Fleetwood Horton (September 20, 1920 – January 25, 2008) was an American film, television and stage actress, who used her given name, Louisa Horton, professionally. She was the former wife of the late The Sting director, George Roy Hill, with whom she had four children.

== Early life ==
Horton was born to Jeter Rice and Frances Breckinridge (née Steele) Horton in Beijing, China. The daughter of a United States Marine Corps officer, she was raised in Haiti and the area around Washington, D.C.

== Career ==
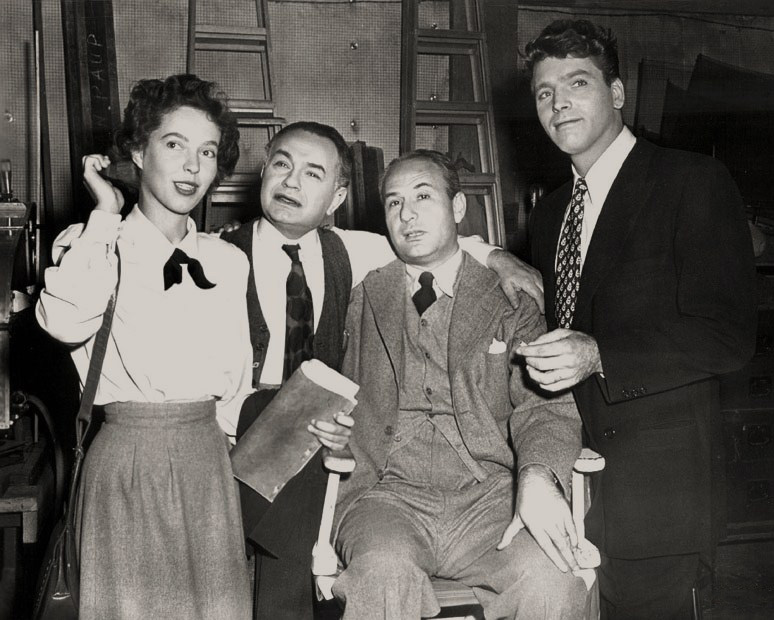
All My Sons: Horton, Edward G. Robinson, Chester Erskine (producer) and Burt Lancaster, 1948

Horton made her feature film debut in All My Sons in 1948, opposite Edward G. Robinson and Burt Lancaster in a film based upon the play by Arthur Miller. Her additional film credits included Swashbuckler, a 1976 film starring James Earl Jones and Robert Shaw.

She made her Broadway debut in 1946, playing the lead in the romantic comedy The Voice of the Turtle. She later received attention for her role as the mother of a lesbian daughter in the off-Broadway play The Blessing in 1989.

Her television roles include many live television series.

== Personal life ==
Horton met her husband George Roy Hill when they were both actors in a Shakespeare repertory company. They were married in 1951, and had four children, but divorced in the 1970s. They reportedly remained close even after their separation. George Roy Hill, who was best known for directing the 1973's The Sting, an Oscar-winning film, as well as 1969's Butch Cassidy and the Sundance Kid, died in 2002.

== Death ==
She lived in Manhattan for nearly 50 years before her death. Louisa Horton Hill died on January 25, 2008, at the Lillian Booth Actors' Fund Home in Englewood, New Jersey, aged 87. She was survived by four children and 12 grandchildren.

== Filmography ==
Year	Title	Role	Notes
1948	All My Sons	Ann Deever	
1952	Walk East on Beacon	Mrs. Elaine Wilben	
1976	Swashbuckler	Lady Barnet	
1976	Alice, Sweet Alice	Dr. Whitman	
