= The Mississippi (TV series) =

Legal drama television series

- Created by: Darryl Ponicsan
- Starring: Ralph Waite; Linda Miller; Stan Shaw
- Composer: Lee Holdridge
- Country of origin: United States
- Original language: English
- No. of seasons: 2
- No. of episodes: 23

Production
- Running time: 60 minutes
- Production companies: Ralph Waite Productions; Hajeno Productions; Warner Bros. Television

Original release
- Network: CBS
- Release: March 25, 1983 – March 6, 1984

Promotional picture for The Mississippi

The Mississippi is an American legal drama television series which ran for 2 seasons from 1983 to 1984 on CBS. The series consisted of 24 episodes: 1 pilot, 6 first-season episodes and 17 episodes in the second season. The series was written by Aubrey Solomon and starred Ralph Waite, Linda Miller, and Stan Shaw.

== Plot ==
Ralph Waite played Ben Walker, a successful criminal attorney who, after retiring his law practice, sought a simpler life on the Mississippi River as the captain of a stern wheel river boat. Conflicting with his desire for an easy retirement from legal practice, he'd find at every port someone who needed a good attorney, and he would end up defending him or her. His “crew” consisted of Stella McMullen and Lafayette 'Lafe' Tate, both of whom were more interested in helping people, fighting crime, and becoming attorneys than in running the tug.

Filming occurred in several cities along the Mississippi River including Natchez, Mississippi, and Memphis, Tennessee.

== Cast ==
- Ralph Waite as Ben Walker
- Linda Miller as Stella McMullen
- Stan Shaw as Lafayette "Lafe" Tate

== Episodes ==
=== Season 1: 1982–83 ===
No. overall	No. in season	Title	Directed by	Written by	Original release date
0	0	"The Mississippi"	Richard C. Sarafian	Darryl Ponicsan	June 14, 1982
Series pilot.
1	1	"Murder at Mt. Parnassus"	Lee H. Katzin	Jerry Ziegman	March 25, 1983
2	2	"Edge of the River"	Lee H. Katzin	Shel Willens	April 1, 1983
3	3	"Beyond a Reasonable Doubt"	Russ Mayberry	Terry Louise Fisher	April 8, 1983
4	4	"We Remember, We Revere"	Leo Penn	Story by : John Wilder & Paul Savage; Teleplay by : Paul Savage	April 15, 1983
5	5	"Mardi Gras"	Ralph Waite	Jeffrey Lane	April 29, 1983
6	6	"Old Hatreds Die Hard"	Leo Penn	Story by : John Wilder & Paul Savage; Teleplay by : Paul Savage	May 6, 1983

=== Season 2: 1983–84 ===
No. overall	No. in season	Title	Directed by	Written by	Original release date
7	1	"There Is a Tiger in the Town"	Jeffrey Hayden	Robert Crais	September 27, 1983
8	2	"Cradle to Grave"	Leo Penn	Patricia Green	October 4, 1983
9	3	"The Trial of Ben Walker"	David Shaw	David Shaw	October 11, 1983
10	4	"The Last Voice You Hear"	Alex March	David Karp	October 18, 1983
11	5	"The Shooting"	Georg Stanford Brown	Sidney Ellis	October 25, 1983
12	6	"Peace with Honor"	Robert Sallin	Patricia Green	November 1, 1983
13	7	"Joey"	Alex March	Irv Pearlberg	November 8, 1983
14	8	"Crisis of Identity"	Harry Harris	David Shaw	November 15, 1983
15	9	"A Town Without Pity"	Oz Scott	Steve Greenberg & Aubrey Solomon	November 22, 1983
16	10	"G.I. Blues"	Leo Penn	Story by : Preston Marshall Ransone & Art Eisenson; Teleplay by : James M. Miller	November 13, 1983
17	11	"Between Fathers and Sons"	John Patterson	Chris Manheim	December 13, 1983
18	12	"The Big Leagues"	Leo Penn	Irv Pearlberg	December 27, 1983
19	13	"Going Back to Hannibal"	Allen Reisner	Alan Brennert	January 10, 1984
20	14	"Wheels of Justice"	William Wiard	David Shaw, Ed Waters	January 17, 1984
21	15	"Informed Consent"	Oz Scott	Rogers Turrentine	January 24, 1984
22	16	"Abigail"	Alex March	Irv Pearlberg	February 7, 1984
23	17	"Home Again"	Allen Reisner	Alan Brennert	March 6, 1984

== US television ratings ==
Season	Episodes	Start date	End date	Nielsen rank	Nielsen rating
1982–83	6	March 25, 1983	May 6, 1983	15	19.3 (Note: Ted with 9 to 5)
1983–84	17	September 27, 1983	March 6, 1984	66	13.6 (Note: Tied with Mama's Family and Automan)

== Awards ==
The episode "Old Hatreds Die Hard" was nominated for a 1983 Primetime Emmy Award for Outstanding Directing for a Drama Series.
