= Linda Miller (actress) =

American actress (b. 1942)

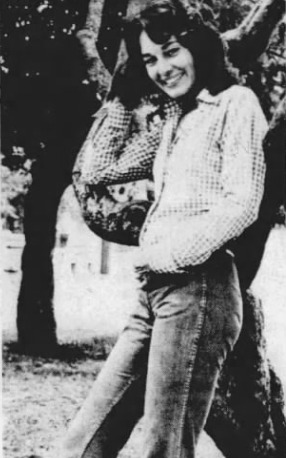
- Miller in 1974
- Born: Linda Mae Gleason; September 16, 1942 (age 84); New York City, U.S.
- Education: Catholic University of America
- Occupation: Actress
- Years active: 1967–present
- Spouse: Jason Miller (m. 1963; div. 1973)
- Children: 3, including Jason Patric
- Parents: Jackie Gleason; Genevieve Halford

Linda Mae Miller (née Gleason; born September 16, 1942) is an American film, stage, and television actress. The daughter of actor and comedian Jackie Gleason and the mother of actor Jason Patric, Miller began working professionally as a child, later appearing on Broadway in a production of Black Picture Show (1975), for which she was nominated for a Tony Award for Best Featured Actress in a Play. She would go on to star in television and in feature films such as the drama One Summer Love, and the horror film Alice, Sweet Alice (both 1976).

== Early life ==
Miller was born Linda Mae Gleason on September 16, 1942, in New York City, the second child of actor Jackie Gleason and dancer Genevieve Halford. She began working in commercials and local stage productions beginning at age nine. Through her father, she is of Irish ancestry. She has one older sister, Geraldine. Miller was raised Catholic by her parents; her mother was described by her sister as "more Catholic than the Pope."

Miller attended the Catholic University of America in Washington, D.C., where she met playwright Jason Miller, then a graduate student. The two were married in 1963.

== Film and stage career ==
Miller was nominated for a Tony Award for Best Featured Actress in 1975 for her role in the Broadway play Black Picture Show. She had a regular role in the 1983 TV series The Mississippi, and her film credits include roles in One Summer Love (1976), Alice, Sweet Alice (1976), An Unmarried Woman (1978), Night of the Juggler (1980) and 2 Little, 2 Late (1999). She also played Ann Beaulieu in the 1988 television movie adaptation of Elvis and Me.

== Personal life ==
From her marriage to playwright and actor Jason Miller, she has three children, including actor Jason Patric.

== Filmography ==
=== Film ===
| Year | Title | Role | Notes |
|---|---|---|---|
| 1967 | Strange Rampage | Janis Payne | |
| 1976 | One Summer Love | Willa | |
| 1976 | Alice, Sweet Alice | Catherine Spages | |
| 1978 | An Unmarried Woman | Jeannette Lewin | |
| 1980 | Night of the Juggler | Barbara Boyd | |
| 1989 | Private Debts | Rhetta Francis | Short film |
| 1990 | Dark Romances Vol. 2 | Marley's Mother | Direct-to-video |
| 1999 | 2 Little, 2 Late | Molly White | |
| 2000 | The Claim | Tobacco Chippie #2 | |
| 2009 | 17 Again | Female Janitor | |
| 2014 | Too Many Cooks | Veronica Van Cook | TV short |

=== Television ===
| Year | Title | Role | Notes |
|---|---|---|---|
| 1977 | Special Treat | Mrs. Burke | Episode: "A Little Bit Different" |
| 1977 | Husbands and Wives | Helene Cutter | TV movie |
| 1980 | Seizure: The Story of Kathy Morris | Lili Connought | TV movie |
| 1983–1984 | The Mississippi | Stella McMullen | Main cast |
| 1985 | Highway to Heaven | Carol Fowler | Episode: "The Secret" |
| 1986 | It's a Living | Gloria Beebe | Episode: "Nancy's Sister" |
| 1987 | Houston Knights | Rose Ellen Hale | Episode: "Mirrors" |
| 1987 | Mr. President | | Episode: "The Magnetic Presidency" |
| 1988 | Ohara | Sarah Dillon | Episode: "The Light Around the Body" |
| 1988 | Elvis and Me | Ann Beaulieu | TV movie |
| 1989 | Freddy's Nightmares | Cathy Jennings | Episode: "Dream Come True" |
| 1991 | Equal Justice | Judith | Episode: "Do the Wrong Thing" |
| 2000 | Law & Order | Jury Foreperson | Episode: "Standoff" |
| 2002 | Law & Order: Criminal Intent | Off. Douglas | Episode: "Tuxedo Hill" |
| 2003 | Law & Order: Criminal Intent | Det. Morris | Episode: "Undaunted Mettle" |
| 2005 | Black Tie Nights | Candy's Boss | Episode: "Dutch Treat" |
| 2006 | Conviction | Foreperson | Episode: "Downhill" |
| 2008–2009 | 3Way | Frankie | 3 episodes |
| 2009 | Law & Order | Sergeant | Episode: "Great Satan" |

== Stage credits ==
| Year | Title | Role | Notes | Ref. |
|---|---|---|---|---|
| 1975 | Black Picture Show | Jane | Nominated—Tony Award for Best Featured Actress in a Play | |
