= Night of the Juggler =

- Theatrical release poster
- Directed by: Robert Butler
- Written by: William P. McGivern (novel); Rick Natkin; William W. Norton (as Bill Norton Sr.)
- Produced by: Jay Weston
- Starring: James Brolin; Cliff Gorman; Richard S. Castellano; Julie Carmen; Linda Miller
- Cinematography: Victor J. Kemper
- Edited by: Argyle Nelson Jr.
- Music by: Artie Kane
- Production company: GCC Productions
- Distributed by: Columbia Pictures
- Release date: June 6, 1980
- Running time: 101 minutes
- Country: United States
- Language: English
- Budget: $6.5 million
- Box office: $54,961

Night of the Juggler is a 1980 American thriller film starring James Brolin.

== Plot ==
Sean Boyd, a former cop, aligns with Maria, a street smart young clerk from the New York City dog pound, on a search for his daughter, who is kidnapped by Gus Soltic, a psychopath, after being mistaken for the daughter of a wealthy real estate developer that he blames for the deterioration of his once beloved South Bronx childhood neighborhood. His search is met with obstacles as he runs afoul of the police in his pursuit, including a corrupt former colleague bent on revenge against him. Meanwhile, the kidnapper is ready to kill anybody, including his young hostage, unless his ransom demands are met.

== Cast ==
- James Brolin as Sean Boyd
- Cliff Gorman as Gus Soltic
- Richard S. Castellano as Lieutenant Tonelli
- Julie Carmen as Maria
- Linda Miller as Barbara Boyd
- Abby Bluestone as Kathy Boyd
- Barton Heyman as The Preacher
- Dan Hedaya as Sergeant Barnes
- Sully Boyar as Larry, The Dog Catcher
- Mandy Patinkin as Allesandro, The Cabbie
- Marco St. John as Hampton Richmond Clayton

== Production ==
Filming started in New York City in July 1978 with Sidney J. Furie directing. James Brolin broke his foot during filming, delaying the production. Furie quit the film in August, after one-third of the film was complete; Robert Butler replaced Furie.

== Reception ==
On the review aggregator website Rotten Tomatoes, 94% of 16 critics' reviews are positive.
