= My Mother Was Never a Kid =

- ABC Afterschool Special episode
- Episode no.: Season 9 Episode 7
- Original air date: March 16, 1981

"My Mother Was Never a Kid" is a 1981 episode of the American television anthology series ABC Afterschool Special, which aired on March 16, 1981. It was based on the 1977 Francine Pascal novel Hangin' Out With CiCi, which in turn was the first teen novel in the "Victoria Martin" trilogy series. It was also the first of two Pascal teen novels that were adapted into Afterschool Specials for the network, the other being The Hand-Me-Down Kid.

== Premise ==
The story revolved around Victoria Martin, a 14-year-old New Yorker whose attempts to be part of the current generation has gotten her into trouble at school (smoking in the girls' bathroom is cited as an example). When her mother Felicia finds out what happened and decides to ground her, Victoria argues with her, leaves the apartment and takes a trip on the subway to meet her friend. During the ride, Victoria kept thinking about how her mother could not understand how she could relate to what she was going through and wonder if her mother was ever a kid.Until an accidental slam on the subway car brake causes Victoria to fall on the floor.

When Victoria comes to a few seconds later, she starts noticing something different: The subway car is clean and has no graffiti; people are dressed differently and when she gets off the train, she is shocked that her neighborhood is nothing like the present day—it's 1944. As she tries to figure out what happened, she runs into another 14-year-old teen named CiCi, with whom she becomes fast friends. Victoria also discovers that she and CiCi seem to have a lot in common, only to discover that after CiCi invites her to stay at her house, CiCi's mother is Victoria's grandma and CiCi is the nickname of Felicia, who will be her mother in the future. This sudden surprise of fate gives Victoria a chance to learn a lot about her mother's past and, at the same time, about her own, which she will discover as she returns to the present day.

== Reception and legacy ==
The program was nominated for five Daytime Emmy Awards in 1981, taking home two for "Outstanding Individual Achievement in Children's Programming—Art Direction/Scenic Design/Set Decoration" and "Outstanding Individual Achievement in Children's Programming—Makeup and Hair Design."

The program was named to the ALA Notable Children's Videos list in 1980.

The episode was also spoofed by RiffTrax, this time featuring Mary Jo Pehl and Bridget Nelson, on May 12, 2019.

== Cast ==
- Rachael Longaker as CiCi
- Mary Beth Manning as Victoria Martin
- Holland Taylor as Felicia Martin
- Jane Lowry as Esther Drew
- Elizabeth Ward as Nina Martin
- Gale Mayron as Steffie
- Carol Morley as Mrs. Serrada
- Nancy Beattie as Old Lady
- Judith Grimley as Betty
- Vincent Murray as Steve
- Jack Mather as Store Manager
- Joe Cosentino as Ted Davis
