= Jane Lowry =

American actress (1937–2019)

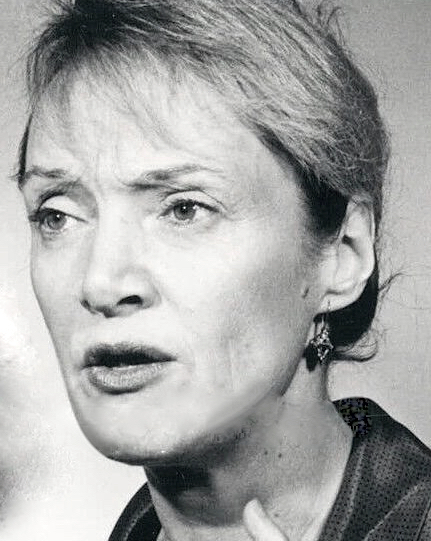
- Lowry in 1970
- Born: February 11, 1937; Minneapolis, Minnesota, U.S.
- Died: November 15, 2019 (aged 82); New York City, U.S.
- Occupation: Actress
- Relatives: Thomas Lowry (grandfather)

Jane Lowry (February 11, 1937 – November 15, 2019) was an American actress primarily known for her theater work on Broadway and regional theater, as well as her singular leading role in Alfred Sole's horror film Alice, Sweet Alice (1976).

A native of Minnesota, Lowry studied theater at Northwestern University under Alvina Krause. She began her career in experimental off-off-Broadway theater, appearing in numerous Joe Cino-produced plays at New York City's Caffe Cino. She later landed roles on Broadway in Poor Bitos in 1964, and as the understudy in the role of Julia in Tennessee Williams's A Delicate Balance, staged at the Martin Beck Theatre in 1966.

In the 1970s, she starred in several productions for the Circle Repertory Company, and made her feature debut as Annie DeLorenze in Alice, Sweet Alice (1976). In 1981, she appeared in the ABC Afterschool Special My Mother Was Never a Kid opposite Holland Taylor.

== Early life ==
Lowry was born in Minneapolis, Minnesota on February 11, 1937 and raised in Wayzata. Her father, Goodrich Lowry, was a banking executive and the son of Thomas Lowry, founder of the Twin City Rapid Transit Company.

She attended the Northrop Collegiate School in Minneapolis before completing her high school education at Miss Hall's School, a boarding school in Pittsfield, Massachusetts. Lowry graduated with a degree in theater from Northwestern University, studying under Alvina Krause. While at Northwestern, she appeared in a production of Cherry Orchard, directed by Krause.

== Career ==
Lowry began her theater career in New York appearing in off-off-Broadway stage productions at Caffe Cino for theater producer Joe Cino, and quickly became a favorite of his. She appeared in And He Made Her, a Biblical-themed play, as Eve in 1961, which was staged at the Cherry Lane Theatre. She next starred in the Caffe Cino's Babel, Babel, Little Tower in June 1961, portraying a waitress, followed by a role as a dancer in Now She Dances! (also 1961), the latter directed by Doric Wilson.

In 1963, she starred in a Michael Kahn-directed production of War, opposite Jerome Dempsey and Gerome Ragni. The following year, she starred in a Broadway production of Poor Bitos at the Cort Theatre. In 1969, she starred as Olga in a Circle Repertory Company production Anton Chekhov's Three Sisters, directed by Marshall W. Mason, followed by the Circle Repertory's A Practical Ritual (1970), in which she co-starred with Spalding Gray.

She made her feature film debut with an unknown role in Believe in Me (1971), originally titled Speed is of Essence. She subsequently had a major supporting role as the aunt of a child suspected in the murder of her sister in Alice, Sweet Alice (1976). Appearing in Cracks at the Theatre de Lys in 1976, Emory Lewis of the Hackensack Record positively compared Lowry to Eve Arden, an actress she was often compared to as they bore similar features. In 1979, Lowry starred as Miss Sophie Gluck in a Hudson Theatre production of Tennessee Williams's A Lovely Sunday for Creve Coeur. In 1981, Lowry co-starred with Holland Taylor in the ABC Afterschool Special My Mother Was Never a Kid.

== Death ==
Lowry died in New York City on November 15, 2019, following a brief illness.

== Filmography ==
Year	Title	Role	Notes	Ref.
1971	Believe in Me	Unknown role		
1976	Alice, Sweet Alice	Annie DeLorenze		
1981	My Mother Was Never a Kid	Esther Drew	ABC Afterschool Special	

== Select stage credits ==
Year	Title	Role	Notes	Ref.
1961	And He Made Her	Eve	Cherry Lane Theatre	
1961	Now She Dances!	Gladys	Caffe Cino	
1961	Babel, Babel, Little Tower	Eppie	Caffe Cino	
1963	War	Lady	Vandam Theatre, New York	
1964	Poor Bitos	Lila	Cort Theatre	
1966–1967	A Delicate Balance	Julia (understudy)	Martin Beck Theatre	
1967	The Time of Your Life	Kitty Duval	Loretto-Hilton Center, St. Louis	
1969	Three Sisters	Olga	Circle Repertory Company	
1970	A Practical Ritual		Circle Repertory Company	
1970	Toys in the Attic	Albertine Prine	Meadow Brook Theater, Oakland University	
1975	The Hot l Baltimore	Suzy	Circle in the Square Theatre	
1975	Ah, Wilderness!	Lily	Stage/West, Springfield, Massachusetts	
1976	Cracks	Irene	Theatre de Lys	
1977	The Hostage	Miss Gilchrist	Cincinnati Playhouse in the Park	
1979	A Lovely Sunday for Creve Coeur	Miss Sophie Gluck	Hudson Theatre	
1979	The Dodge Boys	Vicky	Hudson Theatre	
1982	The Summer People	Ellen Adamson	Coconut Grove Playhouse, Miami	

== Sources ==
- Bottoms, Stephen J. (2008). Playing Underground: A Critical History of the 1960s Off-Off-Broadway Movement. Ann Arbor, Michigan: University of Michigan Press.
- Kronenberger, Louis (1975). The Best Plays. New York: Dodd, Mead & Co. ISBN 978-0-396-07220-1.
- Muir, John Kenneth (2007). Horror Films of the 1970s. Jefferson, North Carolina: McFarland. ISBN 978-0-786-43104-5.
- Plunka, Gene A. (1999). Jean-Claude Van Itallie and the Off-Broadway Theater. Wilmington, Delaware: University of Delaware Press. ISBN 978-0-874-13664-7.
- Stone, Wendell C. (2005). Caffe Cino: The Birthplace of Off-Off-Broadway. Carbondale, Illinois: Southern Illinois University Press. ISBN 978-0-809-38831-8.
- Susoyev, Steve (2007). Return to the Caffe Cino: A Collection of Plays and Memoirs. San Francisco, California: Moving Finger Press. ISBN 978-0-977-42141-1.
- Terrace, Vincent (June 19, 2013). Television Specials: 5,336 Entertainment Programs, 1936-2012 (2nd ed.). Jefferson, North Carolina: McFarland. ISBN 978-0-786-47444-8.
