= One Summer Love =

1976 film by Gilbert Cates

- theatrical poster
- Directed by: Gilbert Cates
- Written by: N. Richard Nash
- Produced by: Gilbert Cates
- Starring: Beau Bridges; Susan Sarandon
- Cinematography: Gerald Hirschfeld
- Edited by: Barry Malkin
- Music by: Stephen Lawrence
- Distributed by: American International Pictures
- Release date: 1976
- Running time: 98 minutes
- Country: United States
- Language: English

One Summer Love, originally titled Dragonfly, is a 1976 romantic drama film directed by Gilbert Cates from a screenplay by N. Richard Nash. It stars Beau Bridges and Susan Sarandon and features Mildred Dunnock and Ann Wedgeworth.

== Plot ==
After being released from a mental hospital, Jesse (Bridges) sets out to find and rejoin his off-beat family. While doing so, he meets a pretty young woman named Chloe (Sarandon) who works in a movie theatre, and they fall in love, which resolves his psychological problems.

== Cast ==
- Beau Bridges as Jesse Arlington
- Susan Sarandon as Chloe Farna
- James Noble as Dr. Lee
- Harriet Rogers as Mrs. Patterson
- Ann Wedgeworth as Pearlie Greyhound
- Linda Miller as Willa Arlington
- Richard Hamilton as Old Car Man
- Martin Burke as Lonny Arlington
- Michael B. Miller as Gabe
- Mildred Dunnock as Miss Barrow
