= The War Next Door =

American sitcom

- Genre: Sitcom
- Created by: Will McRobb; Chris Viscardi
- Starring: Linden Ashby; Damian Young; Susan Walters
- Composer: Donald Quan
- Country of origin: United States
- Original language: English
- No. of seasons: 1
- No. of episodes: 13 (5 unaired)

Production
- Executive producer: Will McRobb; Chris Viscardi
- Producer: Kevin Lafferty
- Running time: 30 minutes
- Production companies: Wellsville Pictures; USA Cable Entertainment

Original release
- Network: USA Network
- Release: July 23 – September 24, 2000

The War Next Door is an American sitcom created by Will McRobb and Chris Viscardi. The show used non-canon humor as one of the two main characters dies at the end of each episode, only to reappear alive the following episode as if nothing had happened. The show ran for only 8 out of 13 episodes and was broadcast on USA Network from July 23 to September 24, 2000.

== Summary ==
Kennedy Smith, a super secret agent, just wants to retire. Unfortunately, his seemingly indestructible nemesis, Kriegman, wants to make his life hell and so moves into the suburbs and becomes Smith's next-door neighbor and evil opponent.

== Cast ==
- Linden Ashby as Kennedy Smith
- Damian Young as Allan Kriegman
- Susan Walters as Lili Smith
- Tara Rosling as Barbara Bush
- Nicole Dicker as Ellis Smith
- Mark Rendall as Lucas Smith

== Episodes ==
No.	Title	Directed by	Written by	Original release date
1	"Kill Kill Kill"	Damon Santostefano	Will McRobb and Chris Viscardi	July 23, 2000
2	"Menage-a-Kill"	Bruce McDonald	Joe Stillman	July 30, 2000
3	"Father Knows Death"	Bruce Seth Green	Tim Hill & Michael Rubiner	August 6, 2000
4	"Death of a Salesman"	David Grossman	Roger S.H. Schulman	August 13, 2000
5	"Death Dish"	Don McCutcheon	Ned Goldreyer	August 20, 2000
6	"Get a Death"	Milan Cheylov	Dan Redican	August 27, 2000
7	"Blood Is Thicker Than Death"	Milan Cheylov	Dan E. Fesman & Harry Victor	September 17, 2000
8	"And Baby Makes Death"	David Straiton	Nell Scovell	September 24, 2000
9	"Death in the Hood"	N/A	N/A	Unaired
10	"Killing with Kindness"	N/A	N/A	Unaired
11	"Paul Is Dead"	N/A	N/A	Unaired
12	"The End of the World as We Know It: Part 1"	N/A	N/A	Unaired
13	"The End of the World as We Know It: Part 2"	N/A	N/A	Unaired
