= Elvis and Me (miniseries) =

- Genre: Biographical drama
- Based on: Elvis and Me by Priscilla Presley, with Sandra Harmon
- Written by: Joyce Eliason
- Directed by: Larry Peerce
- Starring: Susan Walters; Dale Midkiff
- Country of origin: United States
- Original language: English
- No. of episodes: 2

Original release
- Network: ABC
- Release: February 7 – February 8, 1988

Elvis and Me is a 1988 American two-part television miniseries directed by Larry Peerce, and adapted by Joyce Eliason from the 1985 memoir of the same name by Priscilla Presley. It stars Susan Walters as Priscilla, and Dale Midkiff as Elvis Presley.

Elvis and Me aired on ABC on February 7–8, 1988. The first part of the miniseries was ranked the week's fifth most-watched program, as well as ABC's highest-rated television film of the season. Following the airing of the second part, Elvis and Me was ranked as ABC's second highest-rated miniseries ever broadcast, behind Lace (1984).

== Cast ==
- Susan Walters as Priscilla Beaulieu Presley
- Dale Midkiff as Elvis Presley
- Linda Miller as Ann Beaulieu
- Jon Cypher as Captain Joseph Paul Beaulieu
- Billy Green Bush as Vernon Presley
- Anne Haney as Grandma Minnie Mae Presley
- Marshall R. Teague as Rick Colton
- Hugh Gillin as Colonel Tom Parker
- Mark Thomas Miller as Jerry Schilling
- Elden Henson as Don Beaulieu
- Vivian Bonnell as Alberta
- Greta Brown as Tully
- Lynn Hamilton as Hattie
- Elizabeth Hoffman as Mother Superior
- Danni Sue Nolan as Woman Reporter

== Production ==
Filming took place in 1987 in Quebec City, Canada, which doubled for West Germany; other filming locations included Tennessee; Las Vegas and Beverly Hills, California.

Post-production was complicated by a hurried editing process, born out of a desire to get the miniseries to air before the 1988 Winter Olympics.
