= Swashbuckler (film) =

1976 American romantic adventure film by James Goldstone

- Original film poster by John Solie
- Directed by: James Goldstone
- Written by: Paul Wheeler
- Screenplay by: Jeffrey Bloom
- Produced by: Elliott Kastner; Jennings Lang; William S. Gilmore
- Starring: Robert Shaw; James Earl Jones; Peter Boyle; Geneviève Bujold; Beau Bridges; Geoffrey Holder
- Cinematography: Philip H. Lathrop
- Edited by: Edward A. Biery
- Music by: John Addison
- Production company: Universal Pictures
- Distributed by: Universal Pictures
- Release date: July 29, 1976
- Running time: 101 minutes
- Country: United States
- Language: English
- Budget: $8 million

Swashbuckler is a 1976 American swashbuckler adventure film. The film is based on the story "The Scarlet Buccaneer", written by Paul Wheeler and adapted for the screen by Jeffrey Bloom. It was directed by James Goldstone and stars Robert Shaw, James Earl Jones, Peter Boyle, Geneviève Bujold, Beau Bridges and Geoffrey Holder.

The film was released in the UK as The Scarlet Buccaneer.

The film is set in 1718 Jamaica. The acting governor of the island has imprisoned the island's primary judge, and persecuted the judge's family. The judge's daughter hires a pirate captain to assassinate the governor on her behalf. In the process, the captain falls in love with her.

== Plot ==
In Jamaica in 1718, a band of pirates led by Captain "Red" Ned Lynch oppose the greedy acting Governor, the evil Lord Durant. Durant has illegally and ruthlessly imprisoned his Lord High Justice James Barnet (taking over the role himself), taken his possessions and lands, and mercilessly evicted the judge's wife and daughter. Mrs. Barnet and Jane, the daughter do abscond with family jewels and coins. Jane Barnet vocally protests and seeks out a way to overthrow Durant and rescue her now-imprisoned father. After she stumbles upon a drunk Lynch who has given away a family cameo to a bar wench, Jane recognizes it and begins a bar room brawl. There is an attraction between Jane and Lynch but they play it off. The two banter until Jane offers Lynch 10,000 doubloons if he attempts to assassinate Durant and rescue her father.

The ensuing ambush fails, resulting in Jane and three of Lynch's crew being captured and sentenced to death by Lord Durant. The other prisoners, including the judge, are also awaiting execution. Lord Durant has planned to execute all and then sneak away with his illegal booty. Driven by love, Lynch returns to the island and joins forces with the local inhabitants to overthrow the military forces, remove Durant, and return everything Durant has stolen to its rightful owners. In the process Durant is killed by Lynch and all the prisoners are released. Lynch and Jane embrace and board his ship in triumph.

== Cast ==
- Robert Shaw as Captain "Red" Ned Lynch
- James Earl Jones as Nick Debrett
- Peter Boyle as Lord Durant
- Geneviève Bujold as Jane Barnet
- Beau Bridges as Major Folly
- Geoffrey Holder as Cudjo Quadrill
- Avery Schreiber as Pulaski
- Tom Clancy as Mr. Moonbeam
- Anjelica Huston as Woman of Dark Visage
- Bernard Behrens as Sir James Barnet
- Dorothy Tristan as Alice
- Mark Baker as Lute Player
- Kip Niven as Willard Culverwell
- Tom Fitzsimmons as Corporal
- Louisa Horton as Lady Barnet
- Sid Haig as Bald Pirate
- Robert Ruth as Bearded Pirate
- Bob Morgan as Peg Legged Pirate (credited as Robert Morgan)

== Production ==
Pirate films had gone out of fashion with major Hollywood studios since the 1950s, due in part to their high cost. The success of The Three Musketeers (1973) showed that there was still an appetite for swashbucklers, so original producer Eliot Kastner prepared a pirate script where most of the action took place on shore.

"It was prepared to avoid all the hazards of filming on water and it could have been inexpensively made", said co-producer Jennings Lang. "But we decided that it would be cheating the public to do a pirate movie without boats, that would not be using the basic material."

The film was shot in Mexico and on the galleon Golden Hinde, a replica of the Golden Hind captained by English privateer Francis Drake from 1577 to 1580, which had been moored in San Francisco harbor after a five-month journey to California from England. According to the Special Feature section of the DVD, it was the only pirate movie filmed aboard an actual ship of that era.

"I just hope the audience doesn't think its too small", said Goldstone during production about the ship. "All those Errol Flynn movies—the captain's table was 17 feet long. There are parts of our ship that aren't even that wide."

Anjelica Huston was cast for her role over Martine Beswicke and Barbara Steele. Robert Morgan, a stuntman who lost his leg making How the West Was Won (1963), played a one-legged pirate. Robert Shaw said during filming:

I'm underplaying this part when all the others are overplaying. I'm trying to be real but I'm also trying to find some sort of contemporary style. It's a mix between 1976 and what we used to call panache. It's as if you were to do Gary Cooper in '76 – I stand apart and alone. In Jaws I was conscious of overplaying. I'm not ashamed of it. I had to bring those American guys up to a certain pitch of energy. But here I'm taking it down and trying to go in the other way. Trying to be real in an unreal situation. I hate all this action, I loathe it. What am I doing running around like this? I'm better off sitting down, playing a scene like I'm talking to you. What I know about life is a fair bit, but it is not contained in sword fights or running up and down the masts of a ship or taking a punch. It's doubly hard because I'm English. English actors are always being asked to play princes or generals or pirate captains. I never get to sit in a booth with a girl and have a conversation.

Geneviève Bujold made the film under her contract with Universal, in part to avoid a lawsuit due to her backing out of an earlier project at the studio (she took her role in Earthquake for the same reason). She said later she did not regret making the film because "Robert Shaw is a man worth knowing."

Director James Goldstone stated during filming:

We're not doing a boffo comedy. We are not making fun of ourselves. One of the cardinal rules here is that every actor really believe what he is doing could actually happen... I hope to evoke all those feelings that audiences felt when they first saw Errol Flynn's movies, but at the same time I realise that if you saw an actual Errol Flynn movie today, marvelous as they were, you'd laugh. My job here is to keep the energy up, the motion moving forward, to maintain a level of joy.

Costume director Burton Miller said:

Instead of researching the period, I took on producer Jennings Lang's challenge for a non-historical approach and started walking along the [Sunset] Strip. I took what groupies and rock stars wear today and took it back 200 years... The film offered more avenues for self expression than anything I'd ever done before. Universal were very generous [with the costume budget].

Geneviève Bujold said it took two days to shoot her nude swimming scene.

== Release ==
The working title for the film was Swashbuckler, which was changed during production to The Blarney Cock. "We want to avoid the movie being considered a kid's picture", said Lang. "We wanted a title that is arresting to adults as well as kids. This ship in the movie is called "The Blarney Cock", so we decided to make use of that name as the title."

Before release, however, Universal had a change of heart about the suggestive nature of the title and it was reverted to Swashbuckler.

== Reception ==
The film fared poorly at the box office and was described as an "expensive flop". In Leonard Maltin's 2015 publication of movie ratings, the film is rated as a "BOMB". On the other hand, film critic Roger Ebert gave the movie three stars, admiring it as an actual pirate movie at a time when the genre had died out.

== Novelization ==
Bensen, D. R. (1976). Swashbuckler. New York: Bantam Books. ISBN 0553102451. OCLC 0553102451.
