= Mildred Clinton =

American actress (1914–2010)

- Mildred Clinton in Alice, Sweet Alice (1976)
- Born: November 2, 1914; Brooklyn, New York City, U.S.
- Died: December 18, 2010 (aged 96); New York City, U.S.
- Occupation: Actress
- Years active: 1955–2000

Mildred Clinton (November 2, 1914 – December 18, 2010) was an American actress. Clinton had a supporting part in Serpico (1973), and starred in the 1976 horror film Alice, Sweet Alice. In her later career she frequently collaborated with director Spike Lee, appearing in small parts in his films Crooklyn (1994), Summer of Sam (1999), and Bamboozled (2000).

== Biography ==
Clinton was born in 1914 in Brooklyn, New York City. She had her first film role in The Trapp Family in America (1958), and later appeared in Sidney Lumet's Serpico (1973), playing the mother of Frank Serpico (portrayed by Al Pacino). In 1976, she appeared in a lead role in the low-budget horror film Alice, Sweet Alice. Clinton also worked in theater, appearing in a minor part in a 1954–1955 Broadway production of Quadrille, and as Miss Sullivan in The Wrong Way Lightbulb in 1969.

In addition to film and theater, Clinton was a frequent actress in radio plays for CBS Radio Mystery Theater, and also had a recurring role as Judge Sussman on the soap opera The Edge of Night from 1975 to 1976. In her later career, Clinton appeared in several films by Spike Lee: Crooklyn (1994), Summer of Sam (1999), and Bamboozled (2000), the latter of which was her last film credit.

On television, Clinton had a one-woman show, One Woman's Experience that debuted on WABD in New York City on October 8, 1952.

Clinton died on December 18, 2010, in New York City.

== Filmography ==
=== Film ===
Year	Title	Role	Notes
1958	The Trapp Family in America		
1971	A New Leaf	Mrs. Heinrich	Uncredited
1973	Serpico	Mrs. Serpico	
1976	Alice, Sweet Alice	Mrs. Tredoni	
1983	Au nom de tous les miens		English version, Voice, Uncredited
1986	Seize the Day	Woman 2	
1994	Crooklyn	Mrs. Columbo	
1999	Summer of Sam	Italian Woman at Murder Site	
2000	Bamboozled	Louise	(final film role)

=== Television ===
Year	Title	Role	Notes
1955	The Jack Benny Program	Hotel Maid	1 episode
1957	The Big Story	Rachel Tucker	1 episode
1960	Armstrong Circle Theatre	Maria Gozzi	1 episode
1961–62	Car 54, Where Are You?	Mrs. Colby / Mrs. Abrams / Sandra Abrams	3 episodes
1975–76	The Edge of Night	Judge Sussman	Recurring role
1989	Kate & Allie		1 episode
