= Alice, Sweet Alice =

1976 American slasher film by Alfred Sole

- 1977 theatrical poster
- Directed by: Alfred Sole
- Screenplay by: Rosemary Ritvo; Alfred Sole
- Produced by: Richard K. Rosenberg; Alfred Sole
- Starring: Linda Miller; Mildred Clinton; Paula Sheppard; Niles McMaster; Brooke Shields
- Cinematography: John Friberg; Chuck Hall
- Edited by: Edward Salier
- Music by: Stephen J. Lawrence
- Production companies: Harristown Funding, Ltd.
- Distributed by: Allied Artists
- Release dates: November 12, 1976 (Chicago Film Festival); November 18, 1977 (U.S.)
- Running time: 107 minutes
- Country: United States
- Language: English
- Budget: $350,000 (Note: Some contemporaneous newspaper reports indicate the film was made on a budget of $500,000–$1 million, though director Alfred Sole claims the picture was made on budget of $350,000.)

Alice, Sweet Alice, originally titled Communion, is a 1976 American psychological slasher film directed by Alfred Sole, written by Sole and Rosemary Ritvo, and starring Linda Miller, Paula Sheppard, and Brooke Shields in her film debut. Set in 1961 Paterson, New Jersey, the film focuses on a troubled adolescent girl (Sheppard) who becomes a suspect in the brutal murder of her younger sister (Shields) at the latter's First Communion, as well as in a series of unsolved stabbings that follow. Mildred Clinton, Niles McMaster, and Jane Lowry co-star, with Louisa Horton and Lillian Roth appearing in minor roles.

Sole developed the film's screenplay with Ritvo, an English professor who was his neighbor, drawing influence from Nicolas Roeg's Don't Look Now (1973) and the films of Alfred Hitchcock. He assembled a cast of New York City-based actors to appear in the film, largely from theater backgrounds. Principal photography took place throughout the summer of 1975 on location in Paterson and Newark, New Jersey. Through his architectural career restoring historic buildings in Paterson, Sole was able to secure several properties there as filming locations.

The film premiered at the 12th Chicago International Film Festival in November 1976 under its original title, Communion; it opened in England in September 1977 under this same name. After being acquired by Allied Artists, the film was re-titled Alice, Sweet Alice, and released in the United States on November 18, 1977. It was theatrically reissued again in 1981 by Dynamite Entertainment under the title Holy Terror, with a marketing campaign that exploited Shields's appearance in the film following her rising profile. Because the film was not properly registered for copyright between its reissues, it was widely distributed in the home media market by public domain companies until 1997 when Sole made small editorial changes to the film, allowing him to re-copyright it in a variant version.

Alice, Sweet Alice received mixed reviews from film critics, though it was met with largely favorable reception in England. Sole's direction and Sheppard's performance received praise, though many critics found the film's graphic violence and religious themes obscene and anti-Catholic. It received accolades from several film festivals and critical associations. In the years since its release, it has gained a cult following and is considered a contemporary classic of the slasher subgenre in critical circles, as well as an example of an "American giallo." It has also been the focus of scholarship in the areas of horror film studies, particularly regarding its depictions of Roman Catholicism, child emotional neglect, and the disintegration of the American nuclear family.

== Plot ==
In 1961, in Paterson, New Jersey, divorced mother Catherine Spages visits Father Tom with her two daughters, nine-year-old Karen and twelve-year-old Alice, who both attend St. Michael's Parish Girls' School. Karen is preparing for her First Communion, and Father Tom gives her his mother's crucifix as a gift. A jealous Alice puts on a Halloween mask, frightening Father Tom's housekeeper, Mrs. Tredoni. Alice steals Karen's porcelain doll, scares her, and threatens her if she tells anyone.

Moments before her First Communion, Karen is strangled to death in the church transept by a person wearing a Halloween mask and a yellow raincoat; her crucifix is ripped from her neck and her body is set on fire. A nun makes the horrific discovery, disrupting the communion ceremony. After Karen's funeral, Catherine's ex-husband Dominick begins to investigate her murder independently while Detective Spina handles the case formally. Spina suspects Alice may be responsible for her sister's murder based on her documented history of antisocial behavior. Catherine's sister Annie moves in to help her, though Alice and Annie despise each other. Annie also expresses her belief that Alice murdered Karen, much to her husband Jim's dissent.

Catherine sends Alice to deliver a rent check to their landlord, the morbidly obese Mr. Alphonso. When he attempts to molest her, Alice hurts his pet kitten by strangling it and hurling it at the floor. Annie is attacked and stabbed by a masked figure in the apartment stairwell. At the hospital, she claims that Alice tried to kill her. Alice is detained and takes a polygraph examination, and insists Karen is the one that attacked Annie. The results show Alice is telling the truth, but she is still sent to a psychiatric institution for evaluation.

Dominick receives a hysterical phone call from someone claiming to be Annie's daughter Angela, saying that she has Karen's crucifix. Dominick agrees to meet her at an abandoned industrial building. There, the figure stabs him and bludgeons him with a brick before binding him with rope. Dominick sees that the killer is in fact Mrs. Tredoni, who chastises Dominick and Catherine as sinners because of their premarital conception of Alice and subsequent divorce. After Dominick bites Karen's crucifix off Mrs. Tredoni's neck, she pushes him out a window to his death.

Catherine goes to visit Father Tom. He is not home but Mrs. Tredoni invites her in. She explains that when her own daughter died on the day of her First Communion, she realized that children are punished for their parents' sins. In her grief and madness, she devotes herself to the church. Father Tom arrives and tells Catherine that Dominick has died. During Dominick's autopsy, the pathologist finds Karen's crucifix in his mouth, and Alice is eliminated as a suspect. Father Tom and Catherine go get Alice from the institution.

Mrs. Tredoni sneaks into Catherine's apartment building. Mr. Alphonso wakes up screaming, as Alice had mischievously placed a jar of cockroaches on him while he slept. He encounters Mrs. Tredoni in the stairwell and mistakes her for Alice. Mr. Alphonso shoves her against a wall, unmasking her before she stabs him and flees. Detective Spina witnesses Mrs. Tredoni running out maskless through the back door, but is unable to save Mr. Alphonso.

Mrs. Tredoni rushes to the church, unaware the police are stationed there in hopes of apprehending her. During Mass, Father Tom denies Mrs. Tredoni communion and discreetly attempts to escort her to police. She stabs the priest in the throat in front of the congregation as the police rush in. While Father Tom bleeds to death, Alice emerges from the chaotic scene carrying Mrs. Tredoni's shopping bag, and places the bloodstained butcher knife into it.

== Cast ==
- Linda Miller as Catherine Spages
- Mildred Clinton as Mrs. Tredoni
- Paula Sheppard as Alice Spages
- Niles McMaster as Dominick "Dom" Spages
- Brooke Shields as Karen Spages
- Jane Lowry as Annie DeLorenze
- Rudolph Willrich as Father Tom
- Michael Hardstark as Detective Spina
- Alphonso DeNoble as Mr. Alphonso
- Gary Allen as Jim DeLorenze
- Louisa Horton as Dr. Whitman
- Tom Signorelli as Detective Brennan
- Antonino Rocca as Funeral Director
- Lillian Roth as Pathologist
- Sally Anne Golden as Policewoman
- Kathy Rich as Angela DeLorenze
- Marco Quazzo as Robert DeLorenze
- Ted Tinling as Detective Cranston
- Patrick Gorman as Father Pat
- Mary Boylan and Mother Superior
- Peter Bosche as Monsignor
- Joseph Rossi as Father Joe

== Analysis and themes ==
=== Catholicism ===
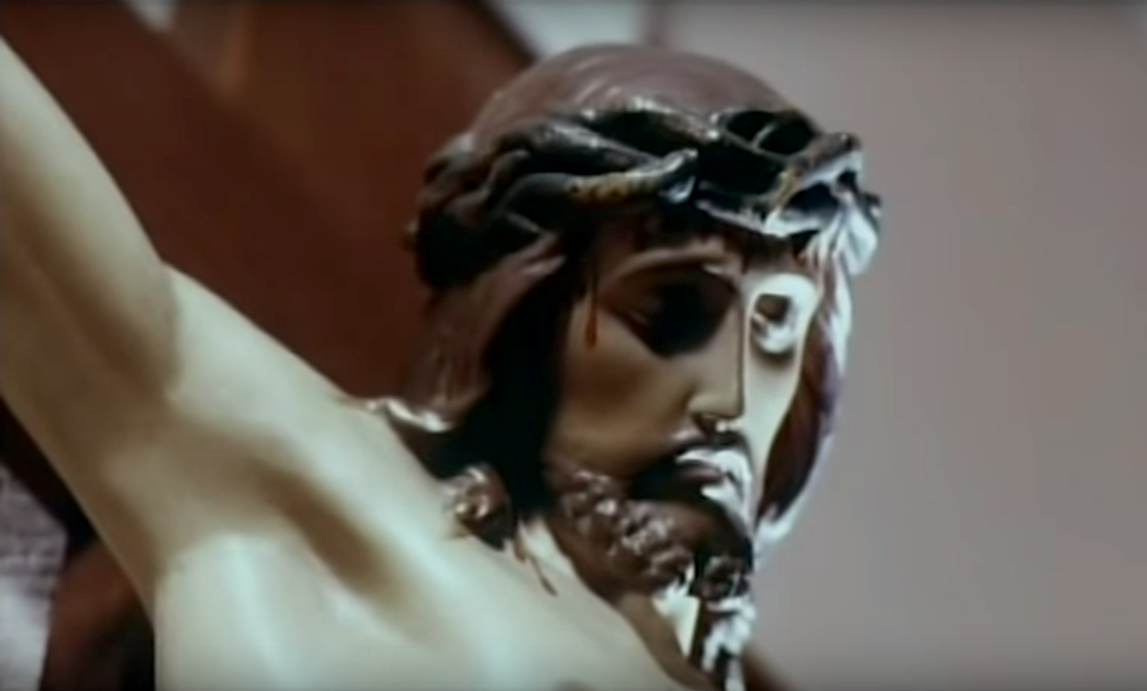
Catholic iconography is a frequent motif in the film.

Numerous film scholars have noted the film's hysterical portrayal of Catholicism and religious institutions to be in direct confluence with the motives of its villain, Mrs. Tredoni, whose ultimate goal is to "punish" the sinning members of her parish; this has resulted in some claiming the film to be overtly "anti-Catholic". Writer-director Sole's own proclaiming of himself as an "ex-Catholic" has also been cited regarding the interpretations of the film's religious themes and undertones. Prior to writing and directing Alice, Sweet Alice, Sole had directed his debut feature, a softcore adult film titled Deep Sleep, in 1972. The release of the film resulted in obscenity charges being brought against him in the state of New Jersey, as well as formal excommunication from the Catholic Church. This event has been credited as influential to the apparent anti-Catholic bent of Alice, Sweet Alice.

The murder scenes in the film have been described by genre scholars such as John Kenneth Muir as "stark and shocking," and noted for their use of "powerful imagery" correlating with the film's religious overtones. Muir views the film as a precursor to such films as Seven (1995), which focus on individuals being punished by death for their sins and character flaws. Catholic iconography is featured prominently throughout the film, including votive candles, crucifixes, and rosaries, as well as artistic depictions of the Virgin Mary in sculptures and paintings. In his book Hearths of Darkness: The Family in the American Horror Film (1996), writer Tony Williams commented that the "adolescent psychotic fantasies" of Alice are paralleled with the ritual practices of the Catholic Church. Williams concludes that the film "bleakly indicts oppressive forces of family and religion as responsible for producing monsters," and that its ambiguous conclusion suggests that Alice herself has become "polluted by the [same] social system" that drove Mrs. Tredoni to commit the murders in the film.

Sheila O'Malley of Film Comment notes that: "From one scene to the next, religious iconography overwhelms the screen: paintings of Mary and Christ, marble statues, crosses on every wall, religion leering at the characters from behind. Parishioners kneel at the altar, pushing out fat tongues for communion (Communion was the film's original title), looking like a parade of aggressive Rolling Stones logos. Religion is not a refuge in Alice, Sweet Alice. It is a rejection of the body itself, but the body—its tongues, its teeth, its menstruation—will not be denied."

Additionally, Chuck Bowen of Slant Magazine observes that the presentation of the church sequences signifies a closed-in nature that "favors cramped medium shots and close-ups that induce claustrophobia. The characters always appear to be cramped together in the church, on top of one another, and their homes are composed of similarly small passageways." Despite this, Bowen asserts that the film is not "exactly an indictment of the church," but rather a "febrile portrait... of how society enables dysfunction on multiple fronts, from the domestic to the religious to the psychiatric." Writer Troy Howarth echoes this reading in his book Unholy Communion: Alice, Sweet Alice from Script to Screen (2021), writing that the film "is not strictly anti-religion... Sole stops short of suggesting that everybody in the Church is corrupt." He cites the sympathetic portrayal of Father Tom to support this, suggesting that it is "the dogma itself which is at the heart of Sole's commentary" rather than the church community at large.

=== Familial dissolution ===
Both Bowen and Williams note familial dissolution as a central theme of Alice, Sweet Alice, citing the backstory involving the Spages and Dominick's separation from Catherine, resulting in a fractured family dynamic exacerbated by the moral code of their religious community. Bowen states: "Sole allows these reverberations, particularly the parallel bitterness existing between Catherine and Annie and Karen and Alice, both of which have been intensified by religion, to gradually assert themselves into our minds... Catherine and Dom's splintered relationship is also portrayed as a gateway to chaos, primarily for Catherine's distracted nature and unwillingness to face the truth of her family."

Scholar Claire Sisco King notes in a 2007 essay that the film is preoccupied with the theme of theatrical performativity perpetrated by children who are emotionally neglected by their parents. King suggests that the title character of Alice is ostracized by her mother and aunt, and lacking attention from her absent father, who only returns after Karen's murder. King elaborates on Alice's performativity:

Alice is driven by her own out-of-control desires, including her jealousy of her sister and her desire for attention. The identity of the killer, who is later revealed to be Mrs. Tredoni, the deranged housekeeper for the beloved local priest, remains concealed by a costume: a plastic Halloween mask and a yellow rain slicker. Suggesting an overt connection between performance and feminine monstrosity, the mask depicts an ornately made-up female face... By asserting such a strong and obvious link between female bodies and performance, this film attempts to cover over the extent to which masculine identity may also be dependent upon performance. The film continually asserts this association between female perversion and performance through its depictions of Alice's need to act up.

Writer David J. Hogan considers Alice, Sweet Alice among a series of films made between the 1970s and 1980s preoccupied with sibling rivalry, and which feature "violations of the integrity of the nuclear family." Hogan views the film as an extension of such features as What Ever Happened to Baby Jane? (1962), an earlier film that blended horror with familial drama between siblings.

== Production ==
=== Development ===
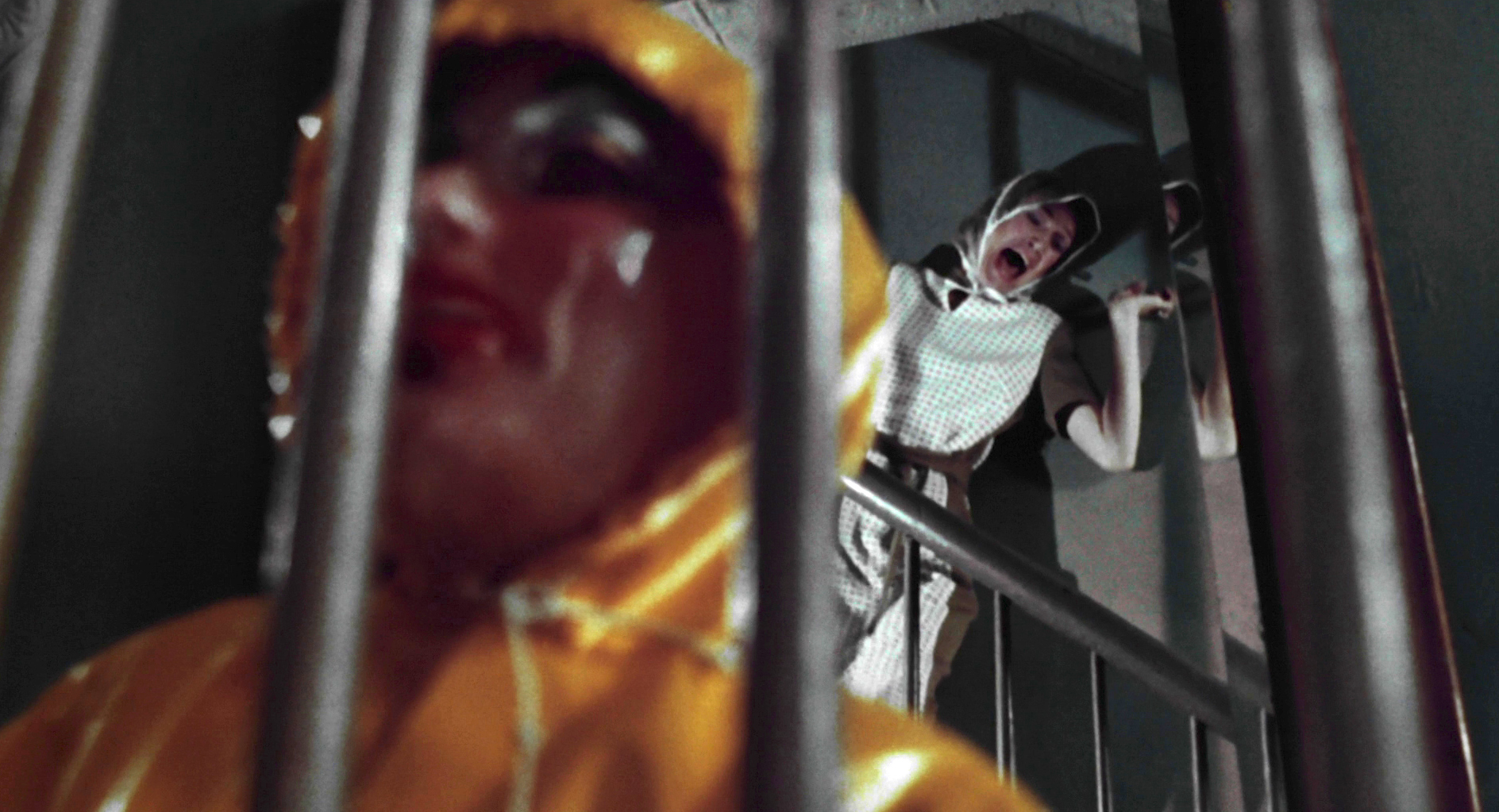
The killer's yellow raincoat is a recurring motif in the film, and a direct reference to the killer with a red raincoat in Don't Look Now (1973).

Director Alfred Sole began writing the film in 1974, collaborating with co-writer Rosemary Ritvo on the script. Ritvo, an English doctoral student at Fordham University, was Sole's neighbor, and the two often talked about films together. "She was a Catholic and we would talk about the Catholic church, religion and stuff like that. Then we started talking about films and theater and I discovered she had a great love of horror films," Sole recalled. The two began meeting during weekends and workshopping the screenplay together. At the time, Sole was working professionally as an architect in New Jersey. Ritvo and Sole wrote approximately two to three drafts of the screenplay before it was completed.

Sole was inspired to make the film after seeing Nicolas Roeg's 1973 psychological thriller, Don't Look Now, based on the short story by Daphne du Maurier. As a result, Alice, Sweet Alice makes several visual references to Don't Look Now, namely the usage of the raincoat that is featured on the villains in both films. In developing the character of Alice, Sole and screenwriter Ritvo aspired to create a "child who has been neglected, and who could go either way," dividing the audience in regards to her guilt or innocence in the crimes committed. Sole chose to set the film in 1960s-era Paterson, New Jersey, his hometown, and culled much of the family drama and dynamics from his own Italian-Catholic upbringing. The character of Mrs. Tredoni, the villain, was based on a woman who lived at the Catholic rectory next-door to his grandmother's house and looked after the clergy.

Sole was also influenced by the works of Alfred Hitchcock, as well as the 1955 French film Les Diaboliques, while assembling compositions in the film. Although many critics have drawn comparisons to Italian giallo films and the works of Dario Argento in particular, Sole claimed to have not seen Argento's work at the time. Nonetheless, the film's incorporation of subtle dark humor and its unsympathetic portrayal of religion—both motifs of giallo thrillers—led to the film's reputation as one of the most "gialloesque" American films in history.

The film was co-produced by Sole and Richard K. Rosenberg, an attorney from Glen Rock, New Jersey who had previously represented Sole.

=== Casting ===
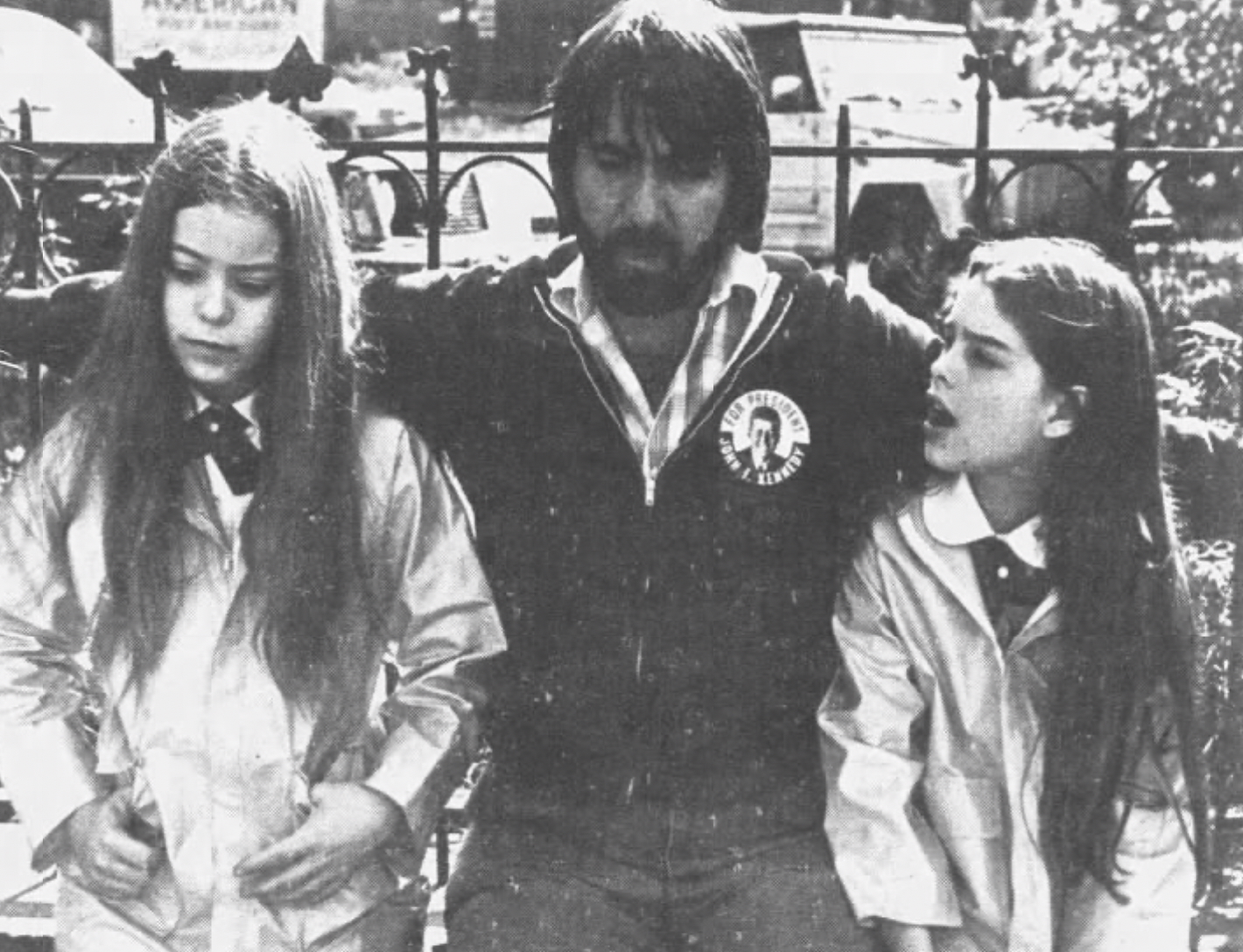
Paula Sheppard, Alfred Sole, and Brooke Shields on the set of Alice, Sweet Alice, 1975

Sole, at the time an inexperienced filmmaker, did not have a casting director to cast the film, and instead would approach various stage actors about playing the parts. "I didn't have a working knowledge of what an actor does," Sole recalled, "so I started going to a lot of theater." Sole would approach actors after shows with his screenplay in hopes of casting them. Brooke Shields was cast in the film as Karen after auditioning in New York City in 1975; director Sole had seen her modeling in a Vogue advertisement, and contacted her mother about the film, expressing his interest in her playing the role of young Karen. For her audition, Shields was required to mime as though she were being strangled to death. Sole recalled that Shields's mother "bent over backwards to help me out."

Sole cast 18-year-old Paula Sheppard, then a dance student at HB Studio, as 12-year-old Alice, the protagonist suspected of her sister's murder. Sole first spotted Sheppard performing as a dancer in a stage production at Connecticut College. Sheppard recalled that he approached her after the performance and asked if she wanted to act in his film: "Several other guys had approached me [before] with the same line, and they were obviously creeps. Alfred seemed kind and honest though, so I talked to him about it." Because Sheppard stood under 5 feet (1.5 m) tall, Sole felt she could pass as an adolescent. "When I saw her, I thought she was fabulous," Sole recalled. "She looked old, she looked young, she looked mean, she looked happy... You know what I mean? She had a great face." In a subsequent interview, Sheppard reflected on her casting: "I never acted before in my life, and to this day I still don’t know why Alfred wanted me in this picture. It was tough to act. I never went to acting school or even paid much attention to actresses in films." Sheppard celebrated her 19th birthday during the shoot on July 7, 1976.

Linda Miller, an actress and daughter of Jackie Gleason, was cast in the role of Alice and Karen's mother, Catherine. Niles McMaster, a Chicago business executive turned actor, was cast as Dominick Spages, Catherine's estranged husband and father of Alice and Karen. Both Miller and McMaster auditioned for their roles via a casting call.

Of the supporting cast, Alphonso De Noble, a New Jersey native, was cast as the sleazy landlord after director Sole had seen him impersonating a priest in local cemeteries. Sole had originally sought veteran stage actress Geraldine Page for the role of Mrs. Tredoni; Page, however, could not due to obligations in a Broadway production, but recommended fellow stage actress Mildred Clinton, who played the role. Tom Signorelli, who played Detective Brennan, an officer investigating the crimes, was a New York stage actor. Lillian Roth, a former film actress-turned-Broadway performer, was cast in a minor role as the pathologist, marking her first film role since Take a Chance in 1933. Actor James Farentino was at one time attached to the project in an unspecified role, per a newspaper advert promoting an April 17, 1975 motion picture contract signing for the film held in Paterson.

In the years after the film's release, Sole spoke favorably of Shields and Sheppard, though he recalled that much of the cast were "New York actors who were doing me a favor." He also commented that he and Miller clashed significantly, describing her as "really difficult to work with... A real nightmare." Despite this, he conceded: "Linda is an excellent actor; they all are."

=== Filming ===
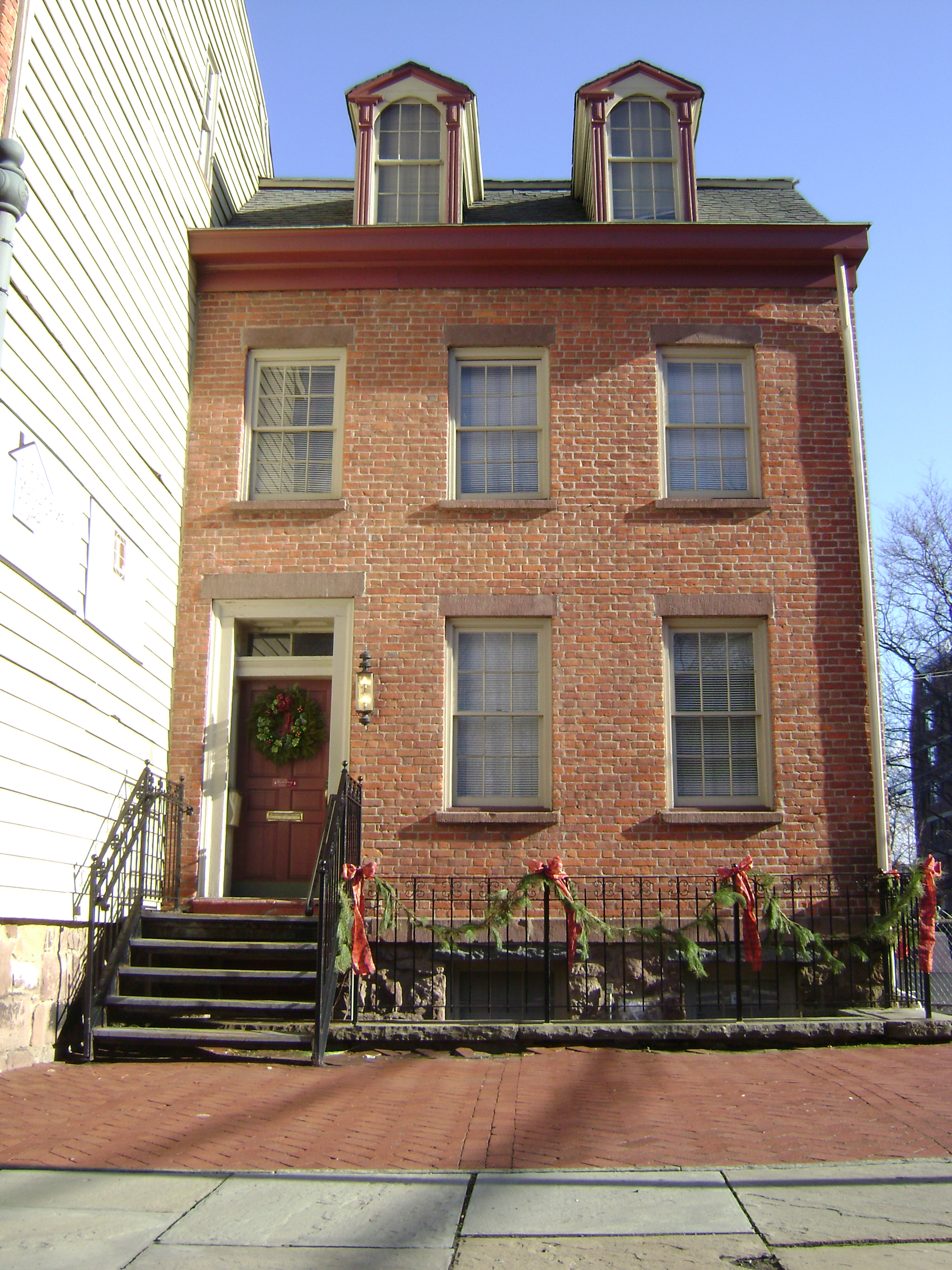
The Spages' apartment building interiors were shot in the historic home of British silk manufacturer John Ryle.

The film was primarily shot on location in Paterson, New Jersey in the summer of 1975, with much of the crew being based out of New York City. It was the first major motion picture to be filmed entirely in the state of New Jersey since 1933. While some newspaper sources stated the budget was $1 million, Sole claimed the film ultimately cost $350,000. To help finance the film, Sole refinanced his home and cleared his life savings. "My family was really supportive," he recalled, "and my mother cooked for the crew, my neighbors chipped in; everyone was just so kind and supportive of me that we eventually got it made." In addition to Paterson, some photography took place in the city of Newark.

Approximately 90% of the film was shot using a 16 mm camera, as Sole wanted the frames to have "wide" appearance with significant foreground. Sole's occupation as a local restorational architect in Paterson helped him secure several shooting locations, effectively lending the film a modern Gothic aesthetic. Among the Paterson locations was the historic Rogers Locomotive and Machine Works building, where several sequences were filmed. Exteriors of the church were shot at St. Michael's Parish in Newark and the First Presbyterian Church in Paterson (demolished two years after filming), while the church interiors were filmed inside the chapel of Paterson General Hospital. Additional photography took place at Paterson's Great Falls, Westside Park, and at the Governor Morris Hotel in Morris Township. The stairwell interiors of the Spages' apartment building were filmed inside the historic former home of British silk manufacturer John Ryle.

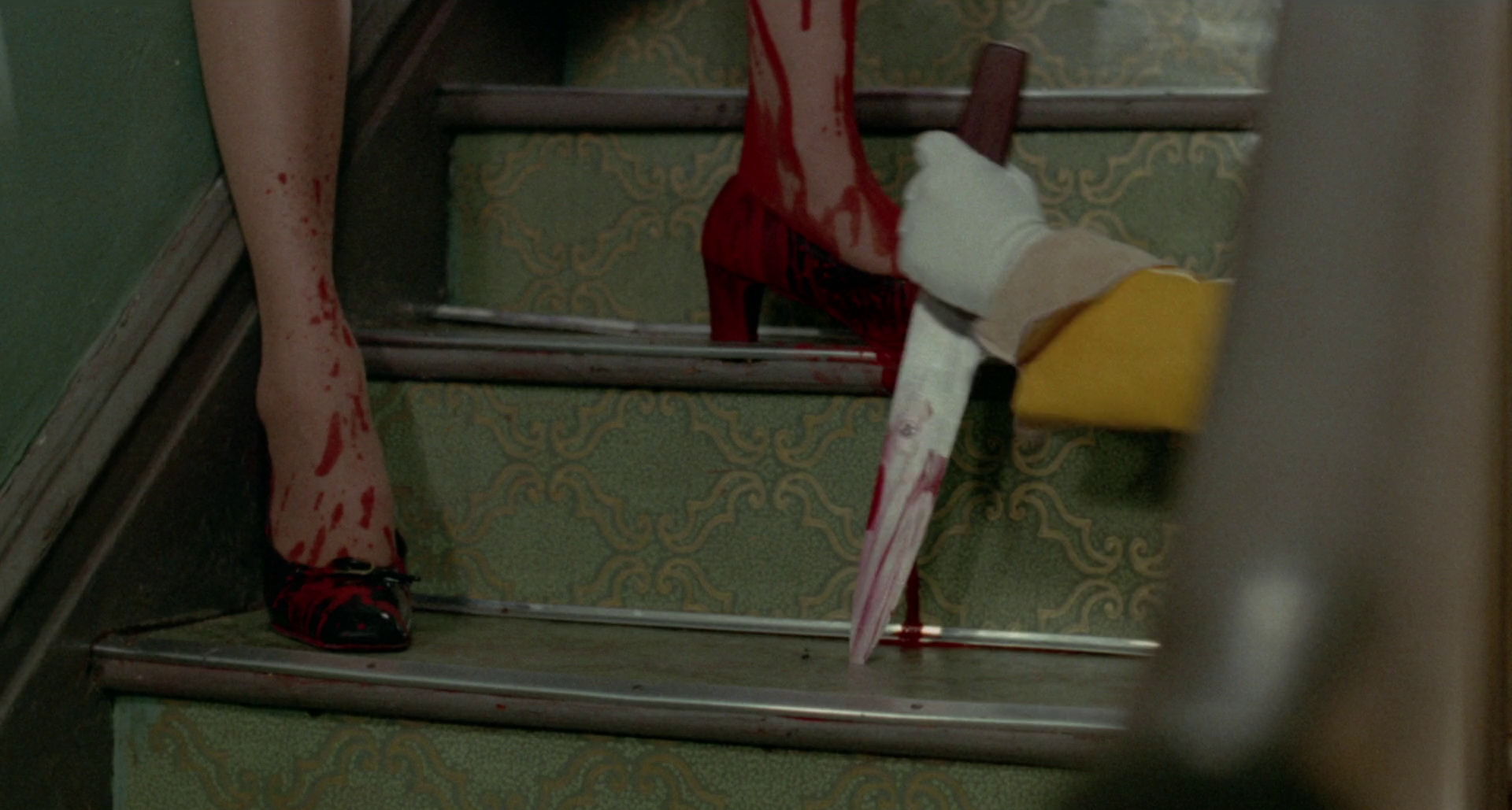
Sole used a collapsible knife to shoot the various stabbing sequences.

The production was periodically postponed during filming, with Sole stating that sometimes two- to four-week breaks would be taken between filming sessions because of budget issues, during which the production sought out additional funding. On one occasion, filming was temporarily halted after actress Linda Miller attempted suicide by slitting her wrist while shooting the film's final sequence in the church. After a week of convalescing, Miller returned to the set and completed her scenes, though a bandage can be seen on her wrist in several sequences. Because of the repeated starts and stops, the production had to recurrently hire new cameramen; Sole estimated that a total of six different cameramen worked on the film. The total number of shooting days was around 20, as estimated by Sole.

For the film's special effects, which included multiple murder sequences by bludgeoning and stabbing, Sole hired friend William Lustig, who would later direct the cult horror film Maniac (1980). Lustig also worked as an assistant cameraman on the film. Dick Vorisek, who had previously worked on Dog Day Afternoon (1975) and Carrie (1976), was hired onto the film as chief sound engineer after Sole was put in contact with him through Technicolor. The special effects in the film were achieved via practical methods, such as the stabbing sequences, which were shot using a fake retractable knife designed by Sole's friend, an engineer. The film's props were all sourced locally, including the mask worn by both Alice and Mrs. Tredoni, as well as Alice's beloved doll, both of which Sole found in a Paterson toy store.

== Music ==
"Prelude"
Stephen J. Lawrence's main prelude theme for Alice, Sweet Alice, featuring repetitive keyboards and dissonant string arrangements.

The original score for Alice, Sweet Alice was composed by Stephen J. Lawrence, and features the use of dissonant string arrangements, church organs, and repetitive keyboard progressions. At the time, Lawrence had never composed a score for a horror film. In writing the musical accompaniments to the film's murder sequences, Lawrence was inspired by the work of Bernard Herrmann, particularly his score for Psycho (1960). Lawrence also cited the works of Ennio Morricone and Franz Waxman as influences on the score. Lawrence's score for the film earned him a music award at the Paris International Festival of Fantastic and Science-Fiction Film.

In a 2007 review of the film for DVD Talk, critic Glenn Erickson called it "a good score [that] approaches a Bernard Herrmann tone, without overdoing it." Chris Alexander of ComingSoon.net made a similar comparison to the work of Herrmann, adding that the score is "subtly effective when it needs to be and more aggressive during the frequent shock scenes."

In 2021, Waxwork Records released the full score for the first time on vinyl.

== Release ==
=== Theatrical ===
Alice, Sweet Alice was shown under its original title, Communion, at the 12th Chicago International Film Festival on November 12, 1976, where it earned a Silver Medal award. It opened at the Fabian Theatre in Paterson, New Jersey, the following day, November 13, 1976. The Paterson premiere of the film was attended by approximately 2,000 audience members.

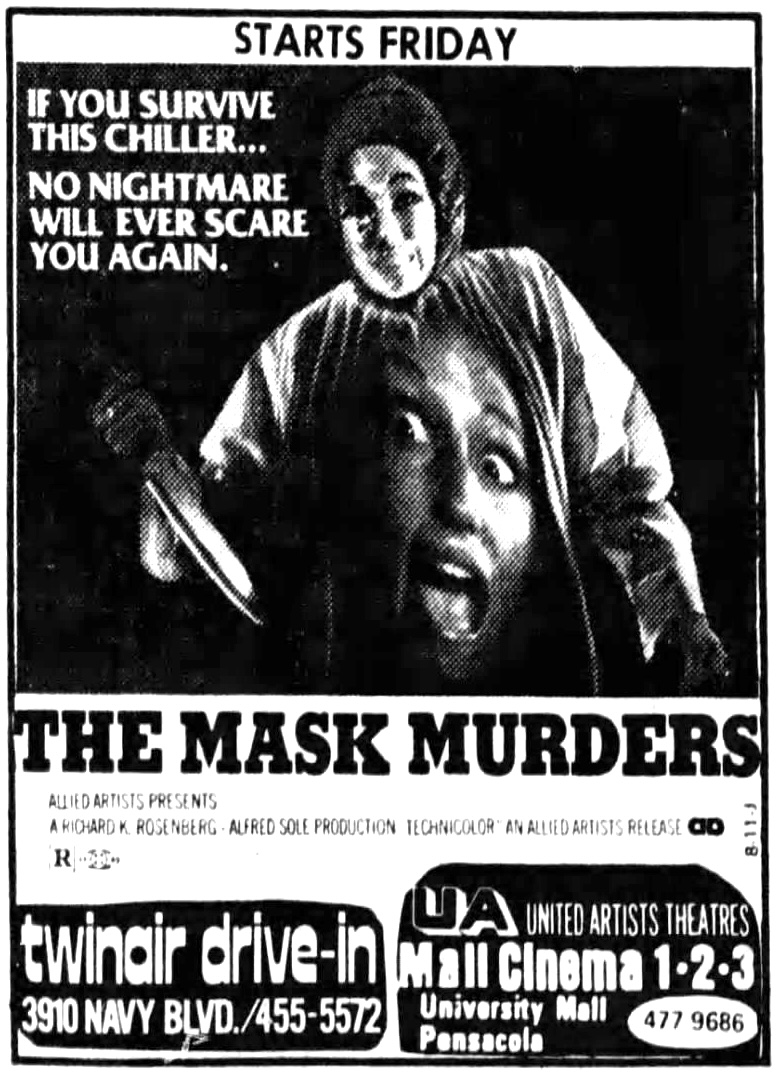
A 1977 American newspaper advertisement promoting the film under a rare alternate title, The Mask Murders.

The film was initially considered for major U.S. theatrical distribution by Paramount Pictures and Universal Pictures before ultimately being acquired by Columbia Pictures. As part of their distribution deal, Columbia secured a book tie-in by author Frank Lauria, which was eventually published in 1977 by Bantam Books. The studio's chief stipulation was that Sole cut a total of three minutes out of the film, to which he agreed. However, following a monetary dispute between Columbia and producer Richard Rosenberg, Columbia ultimately dropped the film from its roster.

In the United Kingdom, Hemdale Film Corporation purchased distribution rights to the film, premiering it in London on September 8, 1977. The British Board of Film Classification cut several minutes from the film for its release in the United Kingdom, including a brief cut that shows Alice gripping a kitten by its neck. Sole later commented: "The kitten was never harmed at all and it was just the camera angle that made it look so violent."

Allied Artists subsequently purchased the film for North American distribution, but mandated that it be re-titled as they felt Communion would lead the public to incorrectly perceive it to be a Christian film. Executive Jerry Grunberg commented that, while the film was well received by test audiences, "almost no one" liked the original title, a claim that was contested by producer Rosenberg. In August 1977, Allied Artists briefly issued the film under the title The Mask Murders, with screenings in Pensacola, Florida, and La Crosse, Wisconsin. The studio revised the title once again to Alice, Sweet Alice, releasing it under this name in 76 theaters in the United States on November 18, 1977. (Note: Newspaper sources show a release in cities such as Philadelphia and Orlando occurring on November 18, 1977.) While Sole expressed dislike for the title, it is the one under which the film became most widely known. The phrase appears in a quote in Volume 16 of the Publications of the Catholic Truth Society, published in 1898, which reads: "Then there is Alice—sweet Alice—your eldest born, who leans over the back of your chair and sweeps your face with her brown curls."

Following the rising fame of Brooke Shields after her performance in Pretty Baby (1978), the film was sub-licensed and reissued for a third time in 1981 under the title Holy Terror through producer Max Rosenberg's distributor Dynamite Entertainment. Promotional materials for this release emphasized Shields's appearance in the film, making it appear as though she was a starring cast member. Shields and her advisers threatened legal action against Dynamite Entertainment, and in May 1981 came to an agreement that Dynamite revise their marketing campaign to minimize her contribution to the film.

=== Home media ===
Due to the changes in distributors and titles as well as a myriad of legal problems, the film was not properly registered with the United States Copyright Office and lapsed into the public domain. As a result, it became widely released in the home media market in the ensuing years. Some VHS versions of the film released in the 1980s feature a truncated 98-minute cut of the film, such as a release by Celebrity Home Entertainment in 1987.

In March 1997, the Roan Group issued the film on LaserDisc in a 106-minute "director's cut" version, with remastering supervised by director Alfred Sole. The LaserDisc also features an audio commentary by Sole and editor Edward Salier as a bonus feature. For this release, Sole made a "small set of editorial changes" which allowed him to re-copyright the film in a variant version. Sole deleted approximately 90 seconds from the original theatrical cut, mainly consisting of a brief scene in which Dominick receives a phone call from his second wife. While the original version still remains in the public domain, most releases use Sole's new director's cut.

In November 1998, Anchor Bay Entertainment released this version on VHS, branded as a restored "collector's edition." The following year, Anchor Bay issued a DVD edition, featuring the same version along with the audio commentary present on the Roan Group LaserDisc. After this edition of the film was deleted, it was re-released on DVD by Hens Tooth Video in 2007, featuring the same master used by Roan and Anchor Bay.

In the United Kingdom, the film was released on VHS by Tartan Video in 1998, and again in 2003 by Video International. In both versions, cuts were mainly made to obscure the sequence in which Alice aggressively grabs a kitten and throws it onto the floor, which were also removed during the film's original British theatrical release. In 2014, 88 Films put out the first-ever anamorphic widescreen DVD in the United Kingdom, utilizing a digitally processed and noise-reduced version of the 1997 Laserdisc master used for the Anchor Bay and Hens Tooth DVD releases. 88 Films then followed up with a British premiere on Blu-ray on July 9, 2018, utilizing a 2K restoration of a 35 mm print.

On August 6, 2019, Arrow Films released a North American Blu-ray edition licensed through Warner Bros. Pictures, who own the original theatrical cut and its camera negative via their acquisition of the Allied Artists catalogue. Arrow's Blu-ray edition utilizes a 2K restoration of the camera negative, sporting both the original Communion and Holy Terror versions, along with several newly produced extras and the alternate Alice, Sweet Alice opening credits. This version reinstates the scene showing Dominick phoning his wife, which Sole had excised for the 1997 LaserDisc master. On February 11, 2025, Arrow Films reissued the film in 4K UHD Blu-ray format. Chuck Bowen of Slant Magazine praised the 4K restoration, calling it "positively gorgeous... every color here has a highly differentiated presence that stands in stark contrast to muddier prior presentations of the film, which should hopefully increase awareness of the film’s artistry."

== Reception ==
=== Critical response ===
Alice, Sweet Alice received mixed reviews from critics upon release, though it largely received critical praise in England. Roger Ebert gave the film a favorable review, stating: "Director Alfred Sole has a brilliant touch for the macabre and there are some splendidly chilling scenes," while US Magazine called the film a "superior modern Gothic thriller." (Note: Quotation is cited from the back cover artwork on the 1999 DVD release of the film by Anchor Bay Entertainment.)

Daniel Ruth of The Tampa Tribune praised the screenplay, referring to it as "a tight, well-paced melodrama that keeps its audience guessing who the murderer is until the last possible moment," while Leonard Maltin awarded the film a mixed 2 out of 4 stars, calling it "[an] OK murder mystery." Bill Brownstein of the Montreal Gazette declared the film "a gory and effective" surprise, praising its cinematography despite its story having "gaps and inconsistencies."

Some critics, such as Vincent Canby of The New York Times, noted the authenticity of the film's characters and settings: "Mr. Sole, whose first feature this is, knows how to direct actors, how to manipulate suspense and when to shift gears: the identity of the killer is revealed at just that point when the audience is about to make the identification, after which the film becomes less of a horror film than an exercise in suspense. He also has a good feeling for the lower middle-class locale and the realities of the lives of the people who live in it." Ernest Leogrande of the New York Daily News echoed Canby's sentiment, awarding the film two-and-a-half stars out of four and writing that it "has qualities that take it out of the usual run of sanguinary homicidal horror movies, an attention given to dialogue, to authenticity of setting and to revelatory and atmospheric touches." The Evening Standard's Alexander Walker praised Sole's direction, citing the film's "crude energy" and "stylistic consistency... it is a text-book on how to thrill and, even more, how to suggest a social texture to a murder melodrama. Every element plays its part."

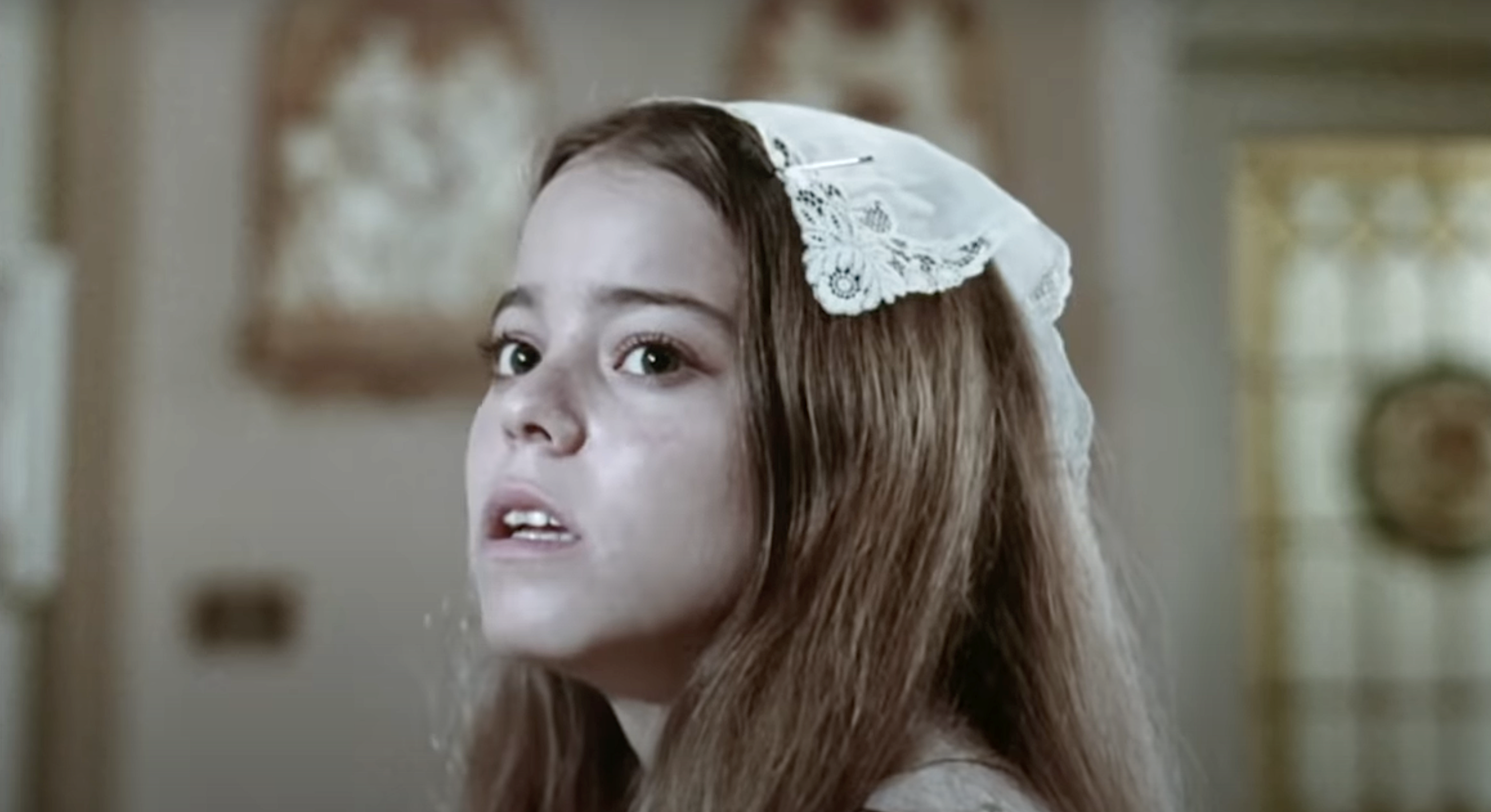
Paula Sheppard received critical praise for her performance as Alice Spages.

Despite some favorable reviews, numerous critics deemed the film obscene due to its violent content, among them Linda Gross of the Los Angeles Times, who, though praising Sheppard and Shields's performances, summarized the film as "foul... Alice, which offers 105 minutes of atrociousness and bloody homicides perpetrated upon children by other children and infirm adults, is an obscenity." The Boston Globe's Michael Blowen similarly deemed the film a "gross vulgarity of an exploitation picture [that] begins as a slick, glossy thriller [but] gradually degenerates into a bloody mess... Sole employs craftsmanlike camerawork and swift editing in an attempt to gloss over the inconsistent script, but this film's complete lack of originality cannot be hidden." William Whitaker of the Abilene Reporter-News also criticized the film's violence as "a little too much after awhile," but conceded that the "script has enough imagination and the direction enough insight to make it passable fare."

The film's unflattering depiction of Catholicism drew significant commentary from critics in both Ireland and its home country of the United States. Tom McElfresh of The Cincinnati Enquirer was particularly critical, describing the film as "wholly, totally terrible," and a "mishmash full of sexual innuendo and rage at the Catholic church." Writing for The Roanoke Times, critic Chris Gladden was dismissive of the film's violent content and "unspeakably disgusting" characters, also deeming its setting within a Catholic parish as "tasteless." The Sunday Telegraph's David Castell similarly noted the film's preoccupation with "distorted religious passion," but conceded that numerous sequences are "so well-staged as to argue persuasively that we have found in Mr. Sole a film-maker of special gifts." Derek Malcolm of The Guardian highlighted the film's commentary on Catholicism, but felt its message was profound, as it "turns a totally exploitative subject matter into an analysis of a small community's religious hypocrisy and hysteria." Malcolm also felt that the characters were realistically written and praised Sheppard's lead performance.

=== Accolades ===
Award/association	Year	Category	Recipient(s) and nominee(s)	Result	Ref.
Chicago International Film Festival	1976	Silver Medal	Alfred Sole	Won	
Paris International Festival of Fantastic and Science-Fiction Film	1977	Best Original Score	Stephen J. Lawrence	Won	
Virgin Islands International Film Festival	1976	Gold Medal	Alfred Sole	Won	

== Legacy ==
In the years following its release, Alice, Sweet Alice garnered a reputation as a cult film. On the review aggregator website Rotten Tomatoes, 71% of 14 critics' reviews are positive, with an average rating of 6.1/10. The website's consensus reads: "Alice, Sweet Alice offsets some of its more ludicrous elements with campy slasher thrills and a dazzlingly macabre atmosphere." Metacritic, which uses a weighted average, assigned the film a score of 67 out of 100, based on 5 critics, indicating "generally favorable" reviews.

TV Guide praised it as "an excellent low-budget horror film from director Sole, whose impressive grasp of filmmaking technique and eye for the grotesque keeps the viewer on edge throughout the movie." Jeremiah Kipp of Slant Magazine noted in his 2005 review of the film: "Possibly the closest American relation to an Italian giallo, the film is head-trippingly hilarious (Jane Lowry, as Aunt Annie, may be the nuttiest screamer in the history of cinema) and features some of the more disquieting set pieces you'll ever see in a horror film." Time Out, London praised the film for constructing "a running commentary on the themes of Alfred Hitchcock: against a carefully evoked background of Catholicism emerge twin themes of repression and guilt."

Horror film scholar Scott Aaron Stine, in The Gorehound's Guide to Splatter Films of the 1960s and 1970s, notes the film as "Compelling, and not entirely predictable, Sole's first (and only truly worthwhile) effort is driven by strong anti-Catholic messages (á la Pete Walker) and—even more pertinent—littered with unflinchingly disturbing scenes of violence that are reminiscent of [Dario] Argento's earlier handling of brutality."

In 2005, Alice, Sweet Alice ranked #89 on Bravo's The 100 Scariest Movie Moments for the scene when Alice scares Karen in the warehouse. In 2017, the film was ranked the fourth-best slasher film of all time by Complex magazine.

== Related works ==
=== Novelization ===
Communion, a tie-in novelization by author Frank Lauria (originally commissioned by Columbia Pictures before the studio dropped the film from its roster) was published in July 1977 by Bantam Books. The tie-in novelization was reissued twice with alternate cover art bearing the film's subsequent re-titles, Alice, Sweet Alice, and Holy Terror.

=== Proposed remake ===
In 2007, director Dante Tomaselli announced his intent to direct a remake, confirmed that he had completed a script with Michael Gingold. Tomaselli intended to score the film using original music along with re-mastered and remixed music from the original film. In 2013 actress Kathryn Morris was cast in the role of Catherine Spages. The remake was to be set in the 1970s, as Tomaselli wanted to be "somewhat more recent while not at all losing its retro style." In May 2016, Tomaselli revealed that the film was delayed due to lack of funds, but also stated that he had been in recent contact with "solid prospects from European production companies and producers."

== Sources ==
- Armstrong, Kent Byron (2000). Slasher Films: An International Filmography, 1960 Through 2001. Jefferson, North Carolina: McFarland. ISBN 978-0-786-41462-8.
- Boyd, David; Palmer, R. Barton, eds. (2006). After Hitchcock: Influence, Imitation, and Intertextuality. Austin, Texas: University of Texas Press. ISBN 978-0-292-71338-3.
- Drebit, Scott (2024). A Cut Below: A Celebration of B Horror Movies, 1950s-1980s. Jefferson, North Carolina: McFarland. ISBN 978-1-476-69195-4.
- Edwards, Matthew (2017). Twisted Visions: Interviews with Cult Horror Filmmakers. Jefferson, North Carolina: McFarland. ISBN 978-1-476-66376-0.
- Everman, Welch (2000). Cult Horror Films: From Attack of the 50 Foot Woman to Zombies of Mora Tau. Secaucus, New Jersey: Carol Publishing Group. ISBN 978-0-806-51425-3.
- Gingold, Michael (2021). "The Locations of Alice, Sweet Alice". In Howarth, Troy (ed.). Unholy Communion: Alice, Sweet Alice, from Script to Screen. Orlando, Florida: BearManor Media. pp. 61–72. ISBN 978-1-629-33766-1.
- Hogan, David J. (2010). Dark Romance: Sexuality in the Horror Film. Jefferson, North Carolina: McFarland. ISBN 978-0-786-46248-3.
- Howarth, Troy (2021). Unholy Communion: Alice, Sweet Alice, from Script to Screen. Orlando, Florida: BearManor Media. ISBN 978-1-629-33766-1.
- King, Claire Sisco (April 2007). "Acting Out and Sounding Off: Sacrifice and Performativity in Alice, Sweet Alice". Text and Performance Quarterly. 27 (2): 124–142. doi:10.1080/10462930701251199. S2CID 219640591.
- Kord, T. S. (2016). Little Horrors: How Cinema's Evil Children Play on Our Guilt. Jefferson, North Carolina: McFarland. ISBN 978-1-476-62666-6.
- Lukeman, Adam (2003). Fangoria's 101 Best Horror Movies You've Never Seen: A Celebration of the World's Most Unheralded Fright Flicks. New York: Three Rivers Press. ISBN 978-1-400-04749-9.
- Maltin, Leonard (2015). Leonard Maltin's 2015 Movie Guide. New York: Penguin. ISBN 978-0-451-41810-4.
- Marriott, James; Newman, Kim (2006). Horror: The Definitive Guide to the Cinema of Fear. London, England: André Deutsch. ISBN 978-0-233-00201-9.
- Meyers, Ric (2011). For One Week Only: The World of Exploitation Films. Guilford, Connecticut: Eirini Press. ISBN 978-0-979-99893-5.
- Muir, John Kenneth (2007). Horror Films of the 1970s. Jefferson, North Carolina: McFarland. ISBN 978-0-786-43104-5.
- Rockett, Kevin (2004). Irish Film Censorship: A Cultural Journey from Silent Cinema to Internet Pornography. Dublin, Ireland: Four Courts. ISBN 978-1-851-82844-9.
- Rotskoff, Lori; Lovett, Laura L., eds. (2012). When We Were Free to Be: Looking Back at a Children's Classic and the Difference It Made. Chapel Hill, North Carolina: University of North Carolina Press. ISBN 978-0-807-83723-8.
- Smith, Richard Harland (2019). Alice, Sweet Alice (Blu-ray audio commentary). Arrow Films. OCLC 1296652483.
- Sole, Alfred; Salier, Edward (1999) [1997]. Alice, Sweet Alice (DVD audio commentary). Troy, Michigan: Anchor Bay Entertainment. OCLC 178777132.
- Stine, Scott Aaron (2015). The Gorehound's Guide to Splatter Films of the 1960s and 1970s. Jefferson, North Carolina: McFarland. ISBN 978-0-786-49140-7.
- Williams, Tony (1996). Hearths of Darkness: The Family in the American Horror Film. Cranbury, New Jersey: Associated University Presses. ISBN 978-0-838-63564-3.
