= Susan Walters =

American actress

- Occupations: Actress, former model
- Years active: 1983–present
- Spouse: Linden Ashby (m. 1986)
- Children: 2

Susan Walters is an American actress, best known for her roles as Lorna Forbes on the ABC daytime soap opera Loving from 1983 to late 1986 and as Diane Jenkins on the CBS soap opera The Young and the Restless from 2001 to 2004, again briefly in 2010, and once more starting in March 2022. For her performance in this role, she won the Daytime Emmy Award for Outstanding Supporting Actress in a Drama Series in 2025. She had recurring roles as Principal Rimkus on The CW's One Tree Hill, as Carol Lockwood on The CW's The Vampire Diaries and as Natalie Martin on the MTV series Teen Wolf.

== Life and career ==
Walters began her television career playing Lorna Forbes Perelli on the soap opera Loving from the pilot in June 1983 to late 1986. Her first role after Loving was in the 1987 film Russkies.

Aaron Spelling hired Walters for several of his productions: in Hotel during its last season (as Ryan Thomas) 1987–1988; in the 1988 television miniseries Elvis and Me as Priscilla Presley; in Nightingales (as Bridget Loring) 1988–1989; and in Melrose Place (as Tiffany Hart).

Other credits include a starring role in 1990 in Dear John, the short-lived prime time series Point Pleasant, and a guest role on CSI: Miami. In 1993, she played Lee Gilrich in an episode of Murder, She Wrote. She garnered attention for her appearances as "Mulva" (real name Dolores) on Seinfeld, which she played in 1993 and again in 1996.

Walters starred as Anne Osborne in the TV series of The Big Easy on the USA Network in 1996. In 1999, she appeared in the Disney Channel movie Horse Sense, as well as its 2001 sequel, Jumping Ship. In 2000, she also portrayed the lead character opposite her husband Linden Ashby on the TV-series The War Next Door.

From 2001 through 2004, she returned to daytime soap opera when she took on the role of Diane Jenkins on The Young and the Restless. In 2010, Walters reprised the role for two episodes.

In 2009, Walters starred in the episode "Pilot" of the first season of Drop Dead Diva alongside her husband, Linden Ashby, as a couple getting divorced. After portraying Principal Rimkus on One Tree Hill in 2009, Walters recurred in the role of Carol Lockwood on The Vampire Diaries from 2009 through 2012.

In 2014, Walters made guest star or recurring appearances on three different series: She played Maia in the CW series Star-Crossed, Lindsay in the CBS series Reckless and Natalie Martin on the MTV series Teen Wolf. In 2015, Walters starred in season 2 episode 7 of How to Get Away with Murder.

In 2022, Walters returned to her role as Diane Jenkins at the conclusion of the March 23, 2022, episode of The Young and the Restless.

== Filmography ==
=== Film ===
Year	Title	Role	Notes
1987	Russkies	Diane	
1991	Defending Your Life	Daniel's Wife	
1992	Galaxies Are Colliding	Beth	
1996	Two Guys Talkin' About Girls	Cindy One	Direct-to-video
1997	'Til There Was You	Robin	
1997	Two Came Back	Allie	
2002	Gale Force	Susan Billings	Direct-to-video
2010	Blood Done Sign My Name	Martha Tyson	
2010	Slow Moe	Mrs. Beth Mobley	
2011	Big Mommas: Like Father, Like Son	Mall Mother	Cameo
2013	Grape	Shari	Short film
2014	Kill the Messenger	Los Angeles Times Editor	Cameo
2017	Wedding Wonderland	Deidre Reynolds	
2018	Virginia Minnesota	Suzette	
2020	Honesty Weekend	Naomi Goodson	
2021	Aftermath	Farrah	

=== Television ===
Year	Title	Role	Notes
1983–1986	Loving	Lorna Forbes	
1987	The Facts of Life	Cynthia Parks	Episode: "Younger Than Springtime"
1987	Who's the Boss	Kitty	Episode: "Mona"
1987–1988	Hotel	Ryan Thomas	11 episodes
1988	Elvis and Me	Priscilla Beaulieu Presley	Television film
1988	Nightingales	Bridget Loring	Television film
1988	Simon & Simon	Marian Fitzwalter	Episode: "The Merry Adventures of Robert Hood"
1989	Nightingales	Bridget Loring	Main role; 13 episodes
1989	Hardball	Madeline Warwick	Episode: "The Silver Scream"
1990	Grand Slam	Ann	Television film
1990	In the Line of Duty: A Cop for the Killing	Julie Tobias	Television film
1990–1992	Dear John	Mary Beth Sutton	Recurring role; 55 episodes
1993	Murder, She Wrote	Lee Gillrich	Episode: "For Whom the Ball Tolls"
1993	Matlock	Melanie Kerns	Episode: "The Haunted"
1993–1996	Seinfeld	Dolores/Mystery Woman	Episodes: "The Junior Mint" & "The Foundation"
1994	The Counterfeit Conressa	Palmer Hewitt	Television film
1994	XXX's & OOO's	Reed Barrett	Television film
1995	Texas Justice	Karen Masters	Television film
1995	Strange Luck	Rosemary	Episode: "Walk Away"
1996–1997	The Big Easy	Anne Osborne	22 episodes
1997	Spy Game	Margo DeSalle	Episode: "Dead and Gone, Honey"
1997	Nash Bridges	Mary Tod Butler	Episode: "Lost and Found"
1997	Two Came Back	Allie	Television film
1998	Hotel del Sol		Episode: "Pilot"
1998	Caroline in the City	Laura Sterling	Episode: "Caroline and the Reluctant Father"
1998	Melrose Place	Christine Denton / Tiffany Hart	7 episodes
1998	I Married a Monster	Kelly Victoria Drummond	Television film
1998	Love Boat: The Next Wave	Amy	Episode: "Dust, Lust, Destiny"
1999	Where the Truth Lies	Penny Morgan	Television film
1999	Horse Sense	Jules Biggs	Television film
1999–2000	Family Law	Tina	Episodes: "Holt vs. Holt" & "Necessity"
2000	The War Next Door	Lili Smith	Main Role; 8 episodes
2000	Providence	Kerry King	Episode: "The Reunion"
2001	Jumping Ship	Jules Biggs	Television film
2001	Crossing Jordan	Gail Horton	Episode: "The Ties That Bind"
2001–2004, 2010, 2022–present	The Young and the Restless	Diane Jenkins	304 episodes
2002	The Ellen Show	Katie	Episode: "Shallow Gal"
2003	CSI: Crime Scene Investigation	Merrit	Episode: "Forever"
2003	Carnivale	Young Becca Donovan	Episode: "Tipton"
2004	JAG	Rachel Smithfield	Episode: "Coming Home"
2004	Summerland	Carol McFarlane	Episode: "To Thine Self Be True"
2004	Combustion	Allison Saunders	Television film
2005–2006	Point Pleasant	Meg Kramer	Main role; 13 episodes
2006	CSI: Miami	Mary Kinnan	Episode: "Speed Kills"
2006	Cold Case	Jane Robinson	Episode: "Joseph"
2006	Split Decision	Debris Radford	Television film
2007	Without a Trace	Jenny Darcy	Episode: "Without You"
2007	Framed for Murder	Claire	Television film
2009	One Tree Hill	Principal Rimkus	Recurring role; 3 episodes
2009	Drop Dead Diva	Vicki Wellner	Episode: "Pilot"
2009	Army Wives	Annette	Episode: "Shrapnel and Alibis"
2009–2012	The Vampire Diaries	Carol Lockwood	Recurring role; 33 episodes
2010	Marry Me	Stella Grafton	Television Mini-series
2011–2017	Teen Wolf	Natalie Martin	Guest role (seasons 1–2); Recurring role (seasons 3–6); 24 episodes
2013	The Following	Prosecutor	Episode: "Pilot"
2013	Perception	Anne Wallace	Episode: "Toxic"
2014	Star-Crossed	Maia	Recurring role; 5 episodes
2014	Reckless	Lindsay Adams	Recurring role; 4 episodes
2015	Girlfriends' Guide to Divorce	Karen	Episode: "Rule #3: Don't Stand in the Doorway"
2015	How to Get Away with Murder	Sharon Tidwell	Episode: "I Want You to Die"
2016, 2018–2020, 2022	The Flash	Dr. Carla Tannhauser	Guest role; 6 episodes
2017	When the Street Lights Go On	Mrs. Munroe	Unaired television series
2018	NCIS	Marcy Brooks	Episode: "Fallout"
2018	The Fosters	Diane Hunter	Recurring role; 3 episodes
2018	Murdered at 17	Carley Emerson	Television film
2019–2021	Good Trouble	Diane Hunter	3 episodes
2021	Tell Me Your Secrets	Angela Miller	Recurring role; 2 episodes
2021	The Rookie	Sloan	Episode: "Fire Fight"

=== Video games ===
Year	Title	Role	Notes
1993	X-Men	Mystique	Voice role
1995	X-Men 2: Clone Wars	Mystique	Voice role

== Awards and nominations ==
Year	Award	Category	Nominated work	Result	Ref.
2025	Daytime Emmy Awards	Outstanding Supporting Actress in a Drama Series	The Young and the Restless	Won	

Preceded by Alex Donnelley	Diane Jenkins (role); 2001–04; 2010; 2022–present	Succeeded by Maura West
Preceded by Maura West	Diane Jenkins (role); 2001–04; 2010; 2022–present	Incumbent
