= Lani O'Grady =

American actress (1954–2001)

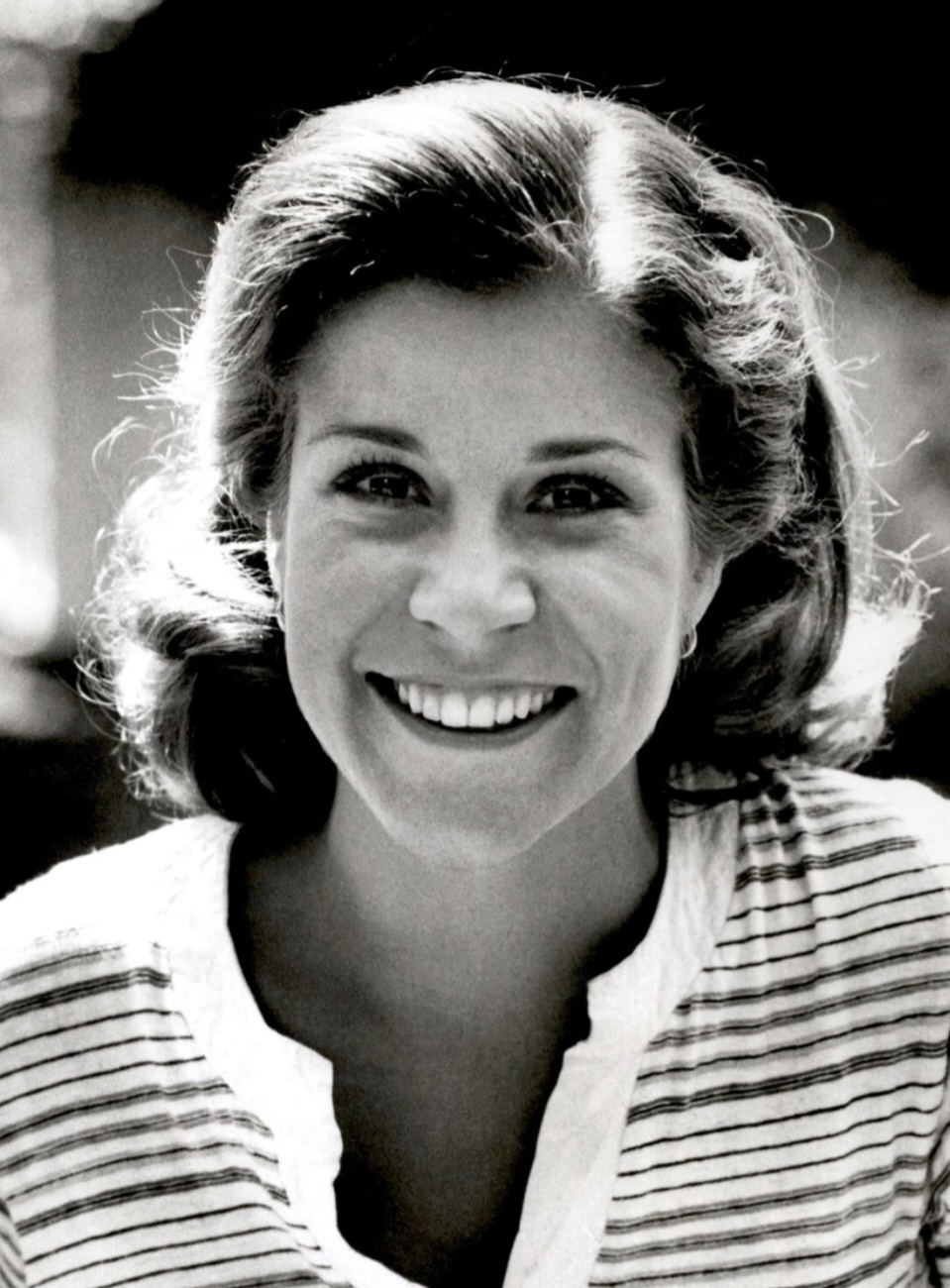
- O'Grady in Eight Is Enough, 1977
- Born: Lanita Rose Agrati; October 2, 1954; Walnut Grove, California, U.S.
- Died: September 25, 2001 (aged 46); Valencia, California, U.S.
- Occupations: Actress; talent agent
- Years active: 1969–1990
- Television: Eight Is Enough
- Relatives: Don Grady (brother)

Lani O'Grady (born Lanita Rose Agrati, October 2, 1954 – September 25, 2001) was an American actress and talent agent. She is best remembered for her role as Mary Bradford, the eldest sister from Eight Is Enough.

== Early life ==
O'Grady was born Lanita Rose Agrati in Walnut Grove, California to Mary B. Grady, a children's talent agent. She was the sister of actor/musician Don Grady. Even as a youngster, she had a low-pitched voice.

== Career ==
O'Grady began acting at age 13 with a role in the television series The High Chaparral. In the early 1970s, she appeared on Harry O and had a role in the 1975 television movie Cage Without a Key, starring Susan Dey. In 1976, she co-starred in the feature film Massacre at Central High along with Kimberly Beck (who appeared as Nancy in the Eight Is Enough pilot).

The following year, O'Grady landed the role of Mary Bradford in the series Eight Is Enough, and she changed her name to O'Grady. She appeared in 112 episodes of the series. She also reprised the role of Mary Bradford in two Eight Is Enough television movies in 1987 and 1989.

After the series ended in 1981, O'Grady had a role in the 1982 television movie The Kid with the Broken Halo. Her last acting role was as Mrs. Kramer in Days of Our Lives in 1990.

== Personal life and death ==
After suffering from agoraphobia and memory blackouts in the early 1990s, O'Grady retired from acting and became a talent agent. She also began taking non-narcotic medication for a diagnosed brain chemical imbalance. In a 1994 interview with the Los Angeles Times, O'Grady said she had suffered from panic attacks since the age of 18 but was not diagnosed with panic disorder until she was 21. She also admitted to abusing prescription drugs, including Valium, as well as alcohol.

In December 1998, she entered the Thalians Mental Health Department at Cedars-Sinai Medical Center for detoxification.

O'Grady died at her home in Valencia, California at the age of 46 on September 25, 2001. An autopsy revealed high levels of the painkiller Vicodin and antidepressant Prozac in her bloodstream. The Los Angeles County Coroner's office stated she died of "multiple-drug intoxication"; the coroner was unable to determine if her death was accidental.

== Filmography ==
Film and television
Year	Title	Role	Notes
1969	The High Chaparral	Penny	Episode: "Time of Your Life"
1970	Headmaster	Judy	Episode: "Count the Ways I Love You"
1973	The Delphi Bureau	Girl	Episode: "The Face That Never Was Project"
1975	Cage Without a Key	Noreen	TV movie
1975	Harry O	Jean; Helen	Episode: "Street Games"; Episode: "Exercise in Fatality"
1976	Baby Blue Marine	Girl #2	
1976	Massacre at Central High	Jane	
1977	The Hazing	Campus Girl	
1977-1981	Eight Is Enough	Mary Bradford	112 episodes
1979-1980	The Love Boat	Maude Victor / Robin	3 episodes
1982	Quincy, M.E.	Zanger's Customer	Uncredited, Episode: "Bitter Pill"
1982	The Kid with the Broken Halo	Julie McNulty	TV movie
1987	Eight Is Enough: A Family Reunion	Mary Bradford	TV movie
1989	An Eight Is Enough Wedding	Mary Bradford	TV movie, (final film role)
1990	Days of Our Lives	Mrs. Kramer	TV series
