= Lucas Tanner =

American television series

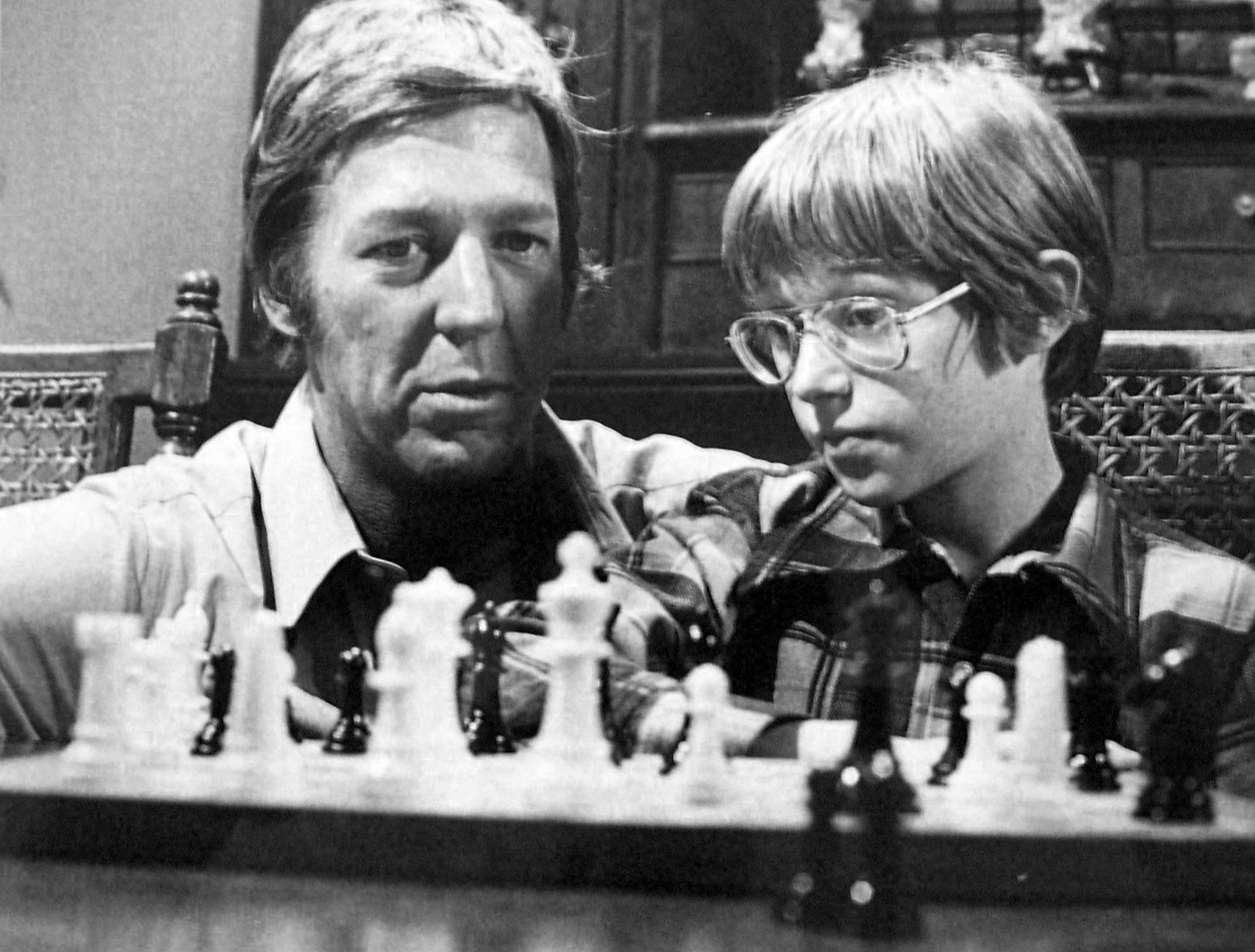
- David Hartman as Lucas Tanner with a gifted student, Scott Glaser (Alfred Lutter III), in the episode "Thirteen Going on Twenty."
- Genre: School drama
- Created by: Jerry McNeely
- Starring: David Hartman; Rosemary Murphy; Robbie Rist
- Composer: David Shire
- Country of origin: United States
- Original language: English
- No. of seasons: 1
- No. of episodes: 22

Production
- Executive producer: David Victor
- Producers: Jay Benson; Jerry McNeely
- Cinematography: Harry L. Wolf
- Editors: Tony Martinelli; Robert Watts; John J. Dumas; Edward Haire; Richard Bracken
- Running time: 60 min
- Production companies: Groverton Productions; R.B. Productions; Universal Television

Original release
- Network: NBC
- Release: September 11, 1974 – April 9, 1975

Lucas Tanner is an American drama series aired on NBC during the 1974–75 season. The title character, played by David Hartman, is a former baseball player and sportswriter who becomes an English teacher at the fictional Harry S Truman Memorial High School in Webster Groves, Missouri, a suburb of St. Louis. He changed professions following the death of his wife and child. Episodes often deal with the resistance of traditional teachers to Tanner's unorthodox teaching style.

Regular co-stars included Rosemary Murphy, Kimberly Beck, John Randolph, and ten-year-old Robbie Rist.

Unusually, the show was actually filmed on location in Webster Groves to a significant degree, though John Marshall High School in Los Angeles served as the setting for the fictional Truman Memorial High School. However, the location filming gave Lucas Tanner a somewhat unusual "look" for a prime-time TV series.

A 90-minute pilot film of the series aired on NBC the week of May 4, 1974; the pilot also starred Kathleen Quinlan and Joe Garagiola.

This series was Hartman's last work as an actor. In November 1975, he began as co-host of ABC's Good Morning America. To date, he has not returned to acting.

== Episodes ==
No.	Title	Directed by	Written by	Original release date
0	"Lucas Tanner"	Richard Donner	Jerry McNeely	May 8, 1974
90-minute pilot.
1	"A Matter of Love"	Gordon Hessler	John McGreevey	September 11, 1974
2	"Instant Replay"	Gordon Hessler	Robert Van Scoyk	September 18, 1974
3	"Thirteen Going on Twenty"	Walter Doniger	Jerry McNeely	October 2, 1974
4	"Winners and Losers"	Leo Penn	Eugene Price	October 9, 1974
5	"A Question of Privacy"	Jerry McNeely	Jerry McNeely	October 16, 1974
6	"Three Letter Word"	Walter Doniger	Leonard & Arlene Stadd	October 23, 1974
7	"By the Numbers"	William Asher	Sue Milburn	November 6, 1974
8	"Echoes"	Walter Doniger	Arthur Heinemann	November 13, 1974
9	"Look the Other Way"	Jerry London	S : Gene Thompson; S/T : Arthur Heinemann	November 20, 1974
10	"Cheers"	Paul Kransky	William Froug	December 4, 1974
11	"Merry Gentlemen"	Walter Doniger	Robert Van Scoyk	December 25, 1974
12	"Bonus Baby"	Randal Kleiser	Bruce Shelly & David Ketchum	January 8, 1975
13	"Pay the Two Dollars"	Allen Baron	Robert Van Scoyk	January 15, 1975
14	"Those Who Cannot, Teach"	Robert Scheerer	S : Lila Garrett; T : Judy Burns & Robert Van Scoyk	January 22, 1975
15	"What's Wrong with Bobbie?"	Walter Doniger	Booker T. Bradshaw & David P. Lewis	January 29, 1975
16	"Collision"	Alexander Singer	T : Robert Van Scoyk; S/T : Max Hodge	February 5, 1975
17	"Why Not a Happy Ending?"	Charles S. Dubin	T : Judy Burns; S/T : Claire Whitaker	February 12, 1975
18	"Shattered"	Richard Bennett	T : Robert Van Scoyk; S/T : Ann M. Beckett	February 19, 1975
19	"The Noise of a Quiet Weekend"	Leo Penn	S : Joel Clark; T : Robert Van Scoyk	February 26, 1975
20	"Requiem for a Son"	Robert Scheerer	David P. Lewis & Booker T. Bradshaw	March 12, 1975
21	"A Touch of Bribery"	Paul Kransky	Eugene Price	April 2, 1975
22	"One to One"	Charles S. Dubin	T : Robert Van Scoyk; S/T : Norman Hudis	April 9, 1975
