= Run, Joe, Run =

- Created by: Richard H. Landau
- Starring: Arch Whiting; Chad States
- Narrated by: Paul Frees
- Opening theme: Richard LaSalle
- Ending theme: Richard LaSalle
- Country of origin: United States
- Original language: English
- No. of seasons: 2
- No. of episodes: 26

Production
- Executive producer: William P. D'Angelo
- Producer: Dick O'Connor
- Cinematography: Alan Stensvold
- Editors: Lovell Ellis; Rudy Freeman; Antranig Mahakian
- Running time: 22 minutes
- Production company: D'Angelo Productions

Original release
- Network: NBC
- Release: September 7, 1974 – November 30, 1975

Run, Joe, Run is a Saturday-morning television program that aired on NBC from 1974 to 1975. It centered on Joe, a German Shepherd in the military's K-9 corps, and his master, Sergeant Will Corey (played by Arch Whiting).

The show was considered as a cross between Lassie and The Fugitive. Like The Fugitive, and later The Incredible Hulk, it centered on a falsely accused person (in this case, the "person" was a dog) running from authorities and helping people it meets along the way. The show was produced by D'Angelo Productions, which also produced the NBC young adult drama Westwind, and other live-action series for Saturday mornings.

== Plot ==
One day, during training, Joe was falsely accused of attacking his master, a crime for which the dog would be euthanised as punishment. However, the dog escaped before being killed and a $200 bounty was put on its head. Sgt. Corey believed Joe was innocent and joined the pursuit, hoping to find Joe before the authorities did.

During the show's second season, Sgt. Corey, having never found Joe (although he always came close), was called back to duty. Joe then teamed with a hiker, Josh McCoy (played by Chad States), and continued to help others, all the while still on the run.

== Cast ==
Paul Frees provided the voice narration for the program.

- Arch Whiting as SGT William Corey (season 1)
- Chad States as Josh McCoy (season 2)

== Episodes ==
=== Season 1 (1974–75) ===
No. overall	No. in season	Title	Directed by	Written by	Original release date	Prod. code
1	1	"Bounty Hunter"	N/A	Richard H. Landau, Arlene Stadd, and Leonard Stadd	September 7, 1974	101
Joe is being tracked down by a bounty hunter. Guest stars: Jeanne Cooper, James Griffith, and Harry Hickox
2	2	"Yardbirds"	N/A	John C. Higgins	September 14, 1974	102
Joe comes to a railroad station where he uses his Army training to help a guard. Guest stars: Bobby Hall, Buck Kartalian, and Bill Walker
3	3	"Bon Voyage"	N/A	Martin Donovan	September 21, 1974	103
Joe helps a fisherman get his nephew back in school. Guest stars: Paul Picerni and Ricky Powell
4	4	"Missionary"	N/A	Richard H. Landau	September 28, 1974	104
Two bounty hunters are to try to chase Joe. Guest stars: Joby Baker, Sandy McPeak, Patricia Morrow, and Owen Orr
5	5	"False Alarm"	N/A	Richard Bluel	October 5, 1974	105
Joe becomes a fire dog; two boys are setting off false alarms; when a real fire starts they learn the hard way about what they've done. Guest stars: Sean Manning, Jimmy McNichol, and Richard X. Slattery
6	6	"The Big Race"	N/A	Donald Boyle	October 12, 1974	106
Joe runs into criminals. Guest stars: Ivor Francis, Karen Purcill, and Dub Taylor
7	7	"Homecoming"	Allen Baron	Harte Catlin and Richard H. Landau	October 19, 1974	107
With Joe hurt, a little girl nurses him back to health. Guest stars: Donald Briggs, Kristy McNichol, E.J. Peaker, Donnelly Rhodes, Albert Salmi, and Maggie Thrett
8	8	"Six Seals, Two Whales and a Dog"	Herman Hoffman	Martin Donovan and Richard H. Landau	October 26, 1974	108
A little boy and his father make Joe a part of their dolphin act. Guest stars: Todd Bass, James Hampton, Shepherd Sanders, and Bill Zuckert
9	9	"Little Big Bear Hunter"	N/A	Maurice Tombragel	November 2, 1974	109
Joe helps a young Indian while he tries to prove his manhood and encounters a wild bear. Guest stars: Frank DeKova and Claudio Martínez
10	10	"Sunken Treasure"	Allen Baron	Richard H. Landau, Arlene Stadd, and Leonard Stadd	November 9, 1974	110
While rescuing a boy, Joe discovers a packet of valuable jewels on him. Guest stars: Chuck McCann and Robbie Rist
11	11	"The Mute"	N/A	Martin Donovan	November 16, 1974	111
After being injured in a fall, Joe is helped by a mute boy. Guest stars: Julie Adams, Heshimu Cumbuka, and Hank Jones
12	12	"Blind Girl"	Charles R. Rondeau	Richard H. Landau	November 23, 1974	112
Joe leads a blind girl, who's gotten lost in the forest, to safety while in return she saves him from harm. Guest stars: Paul Carr, Larry Pennell, Pat Priest, and Michelle Riskas
13	13	"Little Old Lady Antique Dealer"	Allen Baron	Richard H. Landau, Arlene Stadd, and Leonard Stadd	November 30, 1974	113
Joe befriends an elderly antiques dealer. Guest stars: Jack Ging, Eric Laneuville, and Ruth McDevitt

=== Season 2 (1975) ===
No. overall	No. in season	Title	Directed by	Written by	Original release date	Prod. code
14	1	"Joe's New Friend"	N/A	Harte Catlin	September 6, 1975	201
While being chased by two hunters, Joe meets Josh McCoy.
15	2	"The Secret, Part 1"	N/A	Roy M. Rogosin	September 13, 1975	202
While working as a handyman, Josh is accused of robbing the house.
16	3	"The Secret, Part 2"	N/A	Roy M. Rogosin	September 20, 1975	203
Joe and Josh get caught up in a truck hijacking.
17	4	"Rip Off"	N/A	N/A	September 27, 1975	204
Joe and Josh are unaware that a pair of motorcyclists hid a sack of stolen diamonds in Josh's backpack. Guest stars: Owen Orr and Tom Stern
18	5	"The Prisoner"	N/A	N/A	October 4, 1975	205
Joe searches for an escaped prisoner from a crashed plane. Guest stars: Phil Chambers, Jeff Corey, Roy Jenson, and William Mims
19	6	"The Town Hero"	N/A	N/A	October 11, 1975	206
A dogcatcher tries to use Joe and other dogs he's captured to help him commit crimes. Guest star: Walter Brooke
20	7	"Trackdown"	N/A	N/A	October 18, 1975	207
Joe chases a fugitive car thief. Guest stars: Eddie Foy III and Matt Greene
21	8	"The Htchhiker"	N/A	N/A	October 25, 1975	208
Josh breaks his leg. Guest stars: Virginia Gregg and Sid Haig
22	9	"The Wild Stallion"	N/A	N/A	November 1, 1975	209
Joe and Josh find work on a farm where the farmer obsesses over a horse. Guest stars: Don Dubbins and Shannon Terhune
23	10	"The Runaway"	N/A	N/A	November 8, 1975	210
Josh meets a female runaway. Guest stars: Susan Alpern and Robert Carradine
24	11	"The Long Wait"	N/A	N/A	November 15, 1975	211
Josh tries to end a 30-year feud.
25	12	"The Scrap Heap"	N/A	N/A	November 22, 1975	212
Josh gets a job driving a vintage car that is later stolen by thieves who intend to strip it.
26	13	"The Hunters"	N/A	N/A	November 30, 1975	213
When Josh gets a job in a cafe, it is taken over by bank robbers. Guest star: Ralph Meeker

== See also ==
- The Littlest Hobo
