= Tommy Leonetti =

American singer-songwriter (1929–1979)

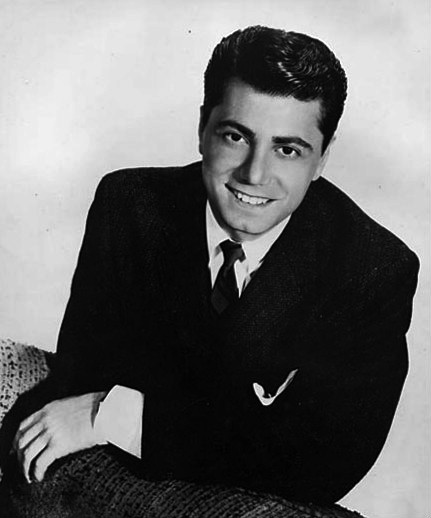
- Leonetti in the 1950s
- Born: Nicola Tomaso Lionetti; September 10, 1929; Bergen County, New Jersey U.S.
- Died: September 15, 1979 (aged 50); Houston, Texas, U.S.
- Occupations: Singer-songwriter, actor
- Years active: 1950–1978

Tommy Leonetti (born Nicola Tomaso Lionetti; September 10, 1929 – September 15, 1979) was an American pop singer-songwriter and actor of the 1950s, 1960s and 1970s. In Australia his most famous song was "My City of Sydney" (written by Leonetti and Bobby Troup) and was used by the Australian television station ATN7 in Sydney for its identification into the 1980s and used in the last day of analogue television broadcasting in Australia on 3 December 2013. In America he achieved greater success as a songwriter for movies and Broadway plays.

== Personal life ==
Tommy Leonetti was born Nicola Tomaso Lionetti in Bergen County, New Jersey in 1929 to Domenico Rocco Lionetti (1886–1969) and Domenica Mirra (1891–1960). His parents were immigrants from Toritto. He was married in 1958 to Patricia Quinn (later "Alice" in the 1968 film Alice's Restaurant) and divorced in 1964 (no children). He later married the American actress Cindy Robbins on November 27, 1965, in Beverly Hills, California.

== Actor ==
Leonetti acted in minor roles in American TV series: Gomer Pyle, U.S.M.C. (1964–1965 as 'Corporal Nick Cuccinelli'), I Spy (1966), Hawaii Five-O (1977), The Waltons (1978) and The Eddie Capra Mysteries (1978). He also had a film role in The Human Duplicators (1965) a science fiction alien invasion movie.

== Singer and entertainer ==
"Free", Leonetti's 1956 single, has been described as a US one-hit wonder peaking at number 23 on Billboard magazine's pop charts. He also had a minor hit with his version of "I Cried" which reached number 30 in 1954. Your Hit Parade (1957–1958), The Steve Allen Show (1958–1959) and The Tonight Show Starring Johnny Carson (1971–1973) featured performances by Leonetti. He also hit in the US with the only charted version of the spiritual "Kum Ba Yah" in early 1969, which hit No. 54 on the Billboard Hot 100 while topping at No. 4 on the Adult Contemporary chart (Billboard Hot 100 January 1, 1969, and the Adult Contemporary Chart on 12/18/68 (both from Joel Whitburn presents Across the Charts The 1960s). Tommy also hit the Adult Contemporary charts on 12/16/67 with his Columbia single "You Knew About Her All the Time" and again on 7/27/68 with "All the Brave Young Faces of the Night." On 1/4/64 Tommy's recording of "Soul Dance" (RCA) hit the Bubbling Under the Hot 100 at No. 105 where it remained for 5 weeks (all info from Across the Charts 1960s, Joel Whitburn, Record Research, Menomonee Falls, WI). While in Australia, Leonetti hosted his own talk-show from 1968 to 1970 for ATN-7, and provided the basis for the parody character Norman Gunston (according to creator Garry McDonald).

His final US chart record was "When I Needed You Most Of All", which, in 1974, reached Record World No. 120 in a 6-week chart run.

He had a number 4 hit in Melbourne in 1968 with "Let’s Take a Walk" (In an interview, his stepdaughter Kimberly Beck claimed she wrote "Let's Take a Walk" when she was 9 years old and recorded it with her stepfather Tommy at age 11 while residing in Sydney, Australia. Leonetti's rendition of "My City of Sydney" (written by Leonetti and Bobby Troup, was used by ATN7 for nightly sign-off can be viewed on Video on YouTube. Sydney punk rockers XL Capris (with lead vocalist Johanna Pigott) provided their version in 1979 (also on Video on YouTube), this promo includes blue-tinged portions from Leonetti's TV sign-off. Other versions were performed by yodeler Mary Schneider, 1990s punk rockers Frenzal Rhomb and James Valentine on his radio show in February 2008. "My City of Sydney" was usually followed by a cartoon of a kangaroo putting its joey to sleep on a bed made from the words "ATN Channel 7," and was in use as late as 1984, when it was replaced by animator Debbie Glasser's cartoon about Sydney.

== In Australian popular culture ==
According to Garry McDonald, the character of Norman Gunston and his television show were initially devised as a parody of Leonetti's late-night Sydney TV variety show, The Tommy Leonetti Show, hosted by Leonetti from 1969 to 1970.

== Songwriter and music composer ==
The American Society of Composers, Authors and Publishers (ASCAP) lists 49 works credited to "Tommy Leonetti". Music for films included: Squeeze a Flower (1970), Massacre at Central High (1976, starred stepdaughter Beck) and She Came to the Valley (1979). He also co-wrote (with Jill Williams) and sang "Cross Roads" for Massacre at Central High. TV music included: The ABC Weekend Special episodes 1.2 "The Ransom of Red Chief", 1.9 "Soup and Me", 2.5 "Little Lulu" and 2.6 "Soup for President".

== Death ==
Leonetti died in 1979 in Houston, Texas after a long battle with cancer.

== Discography ==
=== Albums ===
- Dream Street (1958, RCA Camden)
- Nobody Else But Me (1964, RCA Victor)
- Tommy Leonetti Sings the Winners (1965, RCA Victor)
- Trombones, Guitars and Me (1966, RCA Victor)
- Today (1973, RCA Victor)
