= Massacre at Central High =

1976 American horror thriller film by Rene Daalder

- Theatrical release poster
- Directed by: Rene Daalder
- Written by: Rene Daalder
- Produced by: Jerome Bauman; Harold Sobel
- Starring: Derrel Maury; Andrew Stevens; Robert Carradine; Kimberly Beck; Ray Underwood; Steve Bond
- Cinematography: Bertram van Munster
- Edited by: Harry Keramidas
- Music by: Tommy Leonetti
- Distributed by: Brian Distributing Corporation
- Release date: April 28, 1976
- Running time: 87 minutes
- Country: United States
- Language: English
- Budget: $500,000

Massacre at Central High (released as Blackboard Massacre in the UK) is a 1976 American thriller film directed by Rene Daalder and starring Derrel Maury, Kimberly Beck, Robert Carradine, and Andrew Stevens. The plot follows a series of revenge killings at a fictional American high school, after which the oppressed students take on the role of their bully oppressors. Despite its title, it is not a slasher film but an unusual blend of political allegory, social commentary, and low-budget exploitation; with the exception of the final sequence, no "adult" characters (such as teachers and parents) are seen.

== Plot ==
David (Derrel Maury), a new student at Central High, meets Mark (Andrew Stevens), an old friend whom he once helped out of a jam at their previous school. Mark tells David that the school can be like a country club for him if he befriends Bruce (Ray Underwood), Craig (Steve Bond), and Paul (Damon Douglas), the bullies who rule the school student body; Mark has become their somewhat reluctant accomplice.

Over the next few days, David witnesses Bruce, Craig, and Paul torment the other students, including the scrawny Spoony; the overweight Oscar; Arthur, the school's hearing-impaired librarian; and Rodney, who drives a rundown car that is vandalized by the bullies. After David forcibly thwarts the trio's attempt to rape two female students, Mary and Jane, in an empty classroom, the bullies approach Mark and tell him he only has one more chance to talk David into minding his own business. Meanwhile, David has taken a liking to Mark's girlfriend, and that night when Mark catches David and Theresa having a naked frolic in the ocean, a dejected Mark tells the trio he couldn't make any headway with David. The three bullies decide to take matters into their own hands. Mark insists that he be kept out of whatever plans the trio has for David.

One evening, David is repairing Rodney's car in his garage when the bullies appear and kick the jack out from under the vehicle. One of the wheels crushes David's right leg, crippling him.

After being discharged from hospital, David takes revenge on the trio by arranging fatal "accidents": he electrocutes Bruce by sabotaging his hang-glider to fly into a power line, tricks Craig into high-diving into an empty swimming pool, and pushes Paul's van off a cliff with Paul in it.

The school changes after the bullies' deaths. At first the students support each other, but soon the formerly tormented students become bullies themselves, and try to form alliances with David to control the school. In due course more deaths occur: Arthur is killed when his hearing-aid malfunctions, Oscar's locker explodes when he opens it, and Rodney's car blows up when he starts the engine. While camping under a cliff, Spoony, Mary, and Jane find a box of dynamite but ignore it; when they return to their tent for a threesome, an explosion causes a rockslide, killing them also.

The police blame Spoony, Mary, and Jane for the carnage, but Mark is aware that David is responsible. David bluntly confirms this for his old friend, stating that he killed the bullies to give the tormented students a chance to be happy, but was so disgusted to see them turn into even worse people that he killed them as well. He also calls himself a "madman" while laughing mirthlessly. Mark tells Theresa they must prevent David from killing more people at the school dance with a bomb he has planted in the school basement. Realizing the only way to stop David is by playing on the last sympathies he has towards them, Mark and Theresa enter the gym where the dance is being held. David tells them to leave or they'll die, but they both tell him they're not going anywhere regardless of what that will mean for them. David begins to leave the school but then turns around and limps to the basement, where he removes the bomb. He takes the device outside to dismantle it but there isn't enough time and it blows up, killing him instantly and bringing everyone outside to see the fiery aftermath. To save David's reputation, Mark and Theresa agree to tell the police that Spoony, Mary, and Jane had planted the bomb, and that David had given his life to save everyone.

== Cast ==
- Derrel Maury as David
- Andrew Stevens as Mark
- Robert Carradine as Spoony
- Kimberly Beck as Theresa
- Ray Underwood as Bruce
- Steve Bond as Craig
- Damon Douglas as Paul
- Rex Steven Sikes as Rodney
- Lani O'Grady as Jane
- Dennis Kort as Arthur
- Cheryl Smith as Mary
- Jeffrey Winner as Oscar
- Tom Logan as Harvey

== Production and release ==
Massacre at Central High was written and directed by Rene Daalder in his second feature-film effort, having previously directed the 1969 Dutch drama film De blanke slavin (Trans: The White Slave). Daalder had been recommended to producers Jerome Bauman, and Harold Sobel by Russ Meyer, for whom Daalder had written an unproduced script. Lead actor Derrel Maury was originally cast in the supporting role of Rodney, but later switched roles with fellow actor Rex Sikes. Principal photography commenced in early 1976 over a three-week period in Los Angeles and Malibu. Exteriors of the fictional Central High were shot at Pomona College while interior scenes were shot in Villa Cabrini High School in Burbank.

It was shot in 35mm film, and has a running time of 87 minutes.

=== Alternative version ===
The Italian version of this film, called Sexy Jeans, was edited with pornographic inserts.

== Home media ==
Massacre at Central High was first released on VHS in 1981 in a clamshell case by Electric Video Inc. and a later release with an ordinary slipsleeve box came in 1986 from Viking Video Classics. In the UK, it was released by Apex Video, when exactly is unknown. The film was released on DVD for the first time by TBC on May 28, 2001. It was later released by Black Horse on September 27, 2004, and Desert Island Films on February 18, 2012. Synapse Films released a limited edition Blu-ray and DVD edition of the film on November 18, 2020.

== Reception and legacy ==
Massacre at Central High attracted little attention when first released, but when reissued in 1980, New York Times critic Vincent Canby praised it as "an original, fascinating work", and named it as one of his 20 favorite films of the year. Roger Ebert also discussed the film favorably on his television show Sneak Previews, describing it as "intelligent and uncompromising". (Note: Sources stating that Ebert included the film in his annual "Top 10" list appear to be a confusion with Canby, as Ebert did not publish a written review of the film.) Dave Sindelar from Fantastic Movie Musings and Ramblings praised the film's characters, political subtext, and depth, while criticizing some of the dialogue, and soundtrack. Sindelar concluded his review by writing, "Nevertheless, movies with this much thoughtfulness behind them are uncommon, and whatever its flaws, the movie is definitely worth viewing." TV Guide gave the film three out of five stars, writing, "Massacre at Central High is a fascinating little movie that delivers its expected exploitation thrills while presenting a political allegory, albeit a somewhat confused one." Time Out London also reviewed the film favorably, calling it "An intriguing, diagrammatic example of subversive cinema."

The film's director, Rene Daalder, described Massacre at Central High as "eerily predicting punk and Columbine". (Note: Given the context of this statement, it may be that Daalder was referring to punk culture in cinema rather than punk music.) It has also been cited as a possible influence on the 1988 black comedy Heathers.

By contrast, John Ross Bowie, in comparing the film with the more comedic Heathers, dismissed Massacre at Central High as "exploitative" and "devoid of technique", and criticized its technical flaws and "wooden acting".
