= Cage Without a Key =

1975 film by Buzz Kulik

- Promotional poster
- Genre: Drama
- Screenplay by: Joanna Lee
- Directed by: Buzz Kulik
- Starring: Susan Dey; Sam Bottoms; Katherine Helmond; Lani O'Grady; Anne Bloom
- Music by: Michel Legrand
- Country of origin: United States
- Original language: English

Production
- Executive producer: Douglas S. Cramer
- Producer: Buzz Kulik
- Production locations: Dorothy E. Kirby Center - 1500 S. McDonnell Avenue, Commerce, California
- Cinematography: Charles F. Wheeler
- Editor: Roland Gross
- Running time: 96 minutes
- Production companies: Douglas S. Cramer Company; Columbia Pictures Television

Original release
- Network: CBS
- Release: March 14, 1975

Cage Without a Key is a 1975 American made-for-television drama film directed by Buzz Kulik and starring Susan Dey and Sam Bottoms, with Jonelle Allen and Lani O'Grady in supporting roles. The film premiered on the CBS television network the evening of March 14, 1975, later repeating at various times on The CBS Late Movie. The film was released on VHS under the title Imprisoned Women.

Cage Without a Key was filmed at Las Palmas School for Girls in Commerce, California, now known as the Dorothy Kirby Center. It was a juvenile detention center, not an actual women's prison. Many of the extras were actual inmates.

== Plot ==
17-year-old, Valerie Smith, newly graduated from high school, heads off on a road trip to San Francisco with her friend Joleen. They have just started out when Joleen's car breaks down, but one of Joleen's friends, Buddy (Sam Bottoms) pulls up and offers to take Valerie the rest of the way. He is overly familiar; Valerie does not know him and is reluctant to accept the offer, but is ultimately pressured into accepting the ride. Not far into the trip Buddy decides to rob a liquor store and forces Valerie to assist him at gunpoint. The shopkeeper raises the alarm and is shot dead; the police arrive and both Buddy and Valerie are arrested.

At her trial, Buddy insists that he and Valerie were secret lovers and that it was only at her urging that he committed the robbery. All the witnesses back his version that she was a willing participant, and she is duly convicted of the murder and sent to the San Marcos School for Girls.

It is a big modern prison campus and has modern facilities like a hair salon and its own modern euphemistic language, including the rebranding of solitary confinement as "meditation". The staff meanwhile eschew all modern correctional techniques, keeping the girls in their place by reinforcing their uselessness whenever possible, and failing to intervene in their most blatant acts of skulduggery. The prisoners are divided into two rival camps - one led by the duplicitous, scheming Susie Kurosawa, who is a favorite of the staff, and the other by the forthright Tommy Washington.

Valerie knows she does not belong in this circle and tries to avoid taking sides, but after her 14-year-old friend Sarah has a vat of boiling water tipped over her by the Kurosawa gang, she decides that aligning herself to Tommy's crew might be in her best interests. She continues to battle, aghast at the way the "school" is managed, and not fully comprehending that prison could be much, much worse. She becomes a bit manic.

Away from the prison, her attorney resorts to some very creative work to explode Buddy's story, but when he does it is almost in vain as Valerie prepares to join in on an escape attempt after suffering one tragedy, where Wanda dies from a blood clot, one unhappy setback too many, when a fight breaks out during a running exercise, and Valerie gets involved, trying to subdue Susie. However, when Tommy gets involved, Susie stabs her to death with a knife and Susie is taken away for murder.

== Cast ==
- Susan Dey as Valerie Smith
- Sam Bottoms as Buddy Goleta
- Katherine Helmond as Mrs. Little
- Lani O'Grady as Noreen
- Anne Bloom as Joleen
- Karen Carlson as Betty Holian
- Edith Díaz as Angel Perez
- Susie Elene as Suzy Kurosawa
- Dawn Frame as Sarah
- Victoria Huxtable as Jamie
- Karen Morrow as Mrs. Turner
- Margaret Willock as Wanda Polsky
- Ann D'Andrea as Ann D'Andrea
- Annette Henley as Rosie
- Marc Alaimo as Workman
- Carol Carrington as Juvenile Hall Matron

== Reception ==
The Herald Journal noted that it is a "dramatization of a fictional story, based on real life incidents found in the records of several juvenile schools of detention in the United States." They go on to state the film is a "gut-numbing, inside the walls look look at life in a type of juvenile penal facility that can be found in some places in this nation."

The Republican said "the theme of this film – how a poorly run juvenile detention home can turn teenagers into hardened criminals – is placed in Kulik's careful hands and his treatment of the material and of the cast keeps this shocker from going awry." The Cincinnati Post opined that "the film was magnificently done and had many messages to convey; it exposed how our children are denied the civil rights accorded to the most derelict of adults and it showed that love and caring can exist under the most miserable conditions and that hate destroys."

The Boston Globe commented it is "a crude, contrived melodrama that is calculated to stir the emotions, which it certainly does ... we find homosexuality, drugs, gang warfare and cruelty explicitly depicted ... but there is just too much calculation here to give it validity."

== See also ==
- List of LGBTQ-related films of 1975
