= Susan Richardson =

American actress

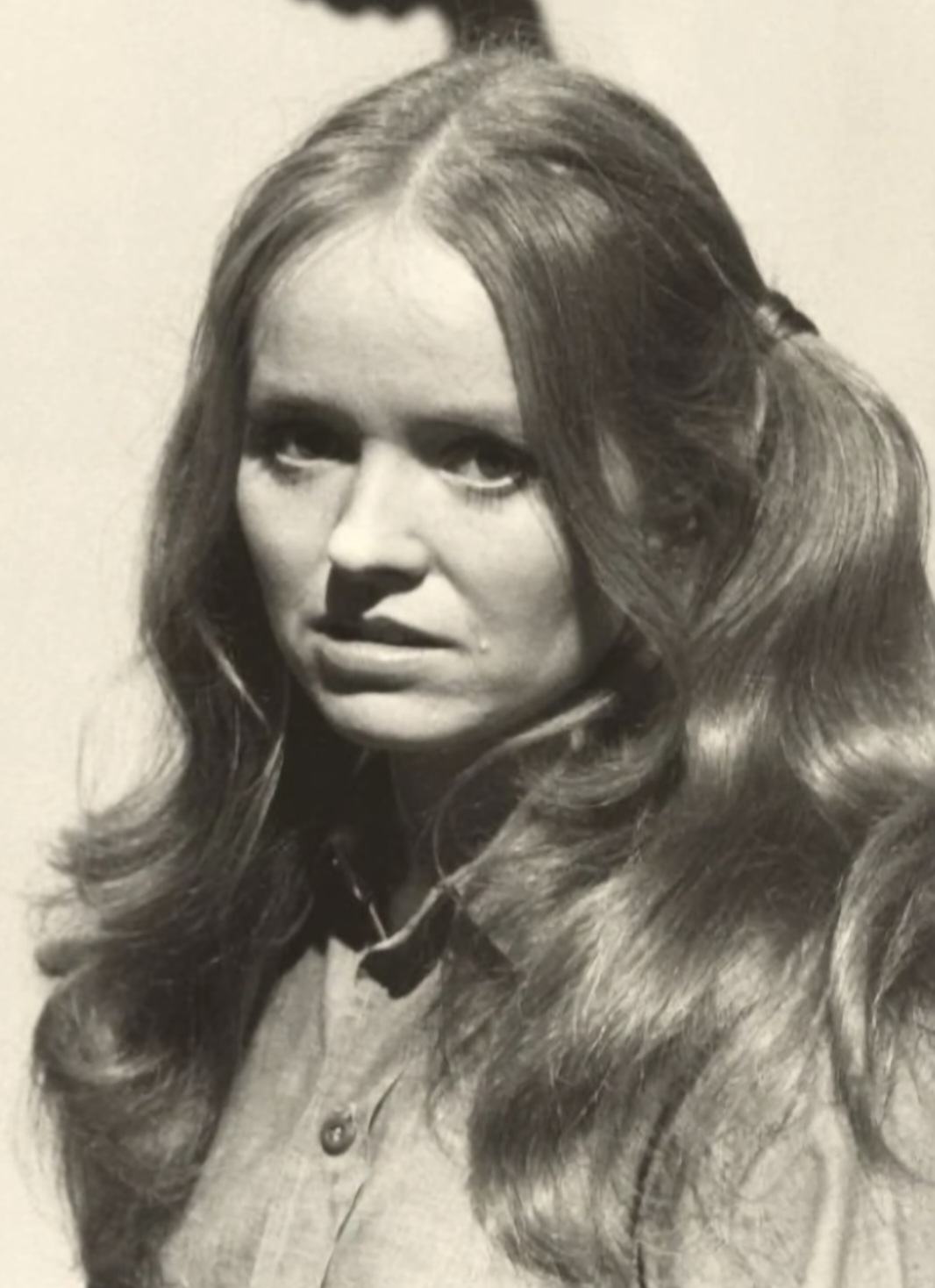
- Richardson in The Runaways, 1979
- Born: Coatesville, Pennsylvania, U.S.
- Occupations: Actress, nursing home caregiver, author and illustrator of children's books
- Years active: 1973–1999
- Known for: Susan Bradford in Eight Is Enough
- Spouse: Michael Virden (m. 1978; div. 1985)
- Children: 1

Susan Richardson is an American retired actress, best known for her role as Susan Bradford on the television series Eight Is Enough, which she played from 1977 to 1981.

== Early life ==
Born in Coatesville, Pennsylvania, Richardson first started acting in plays in high school. She graduated from Coatesville Area Senior High School in Coatesville, Pennsylvania in 1969, and moved to Hollywood in 1971.

== Career ==
Initially, Richardson played bit parts in feature films American Graffiti (1973) and A Star Is Born (1976), and she guest-starred on the television series Happy Days and The Streets of San Francisco. Shortly before her 25th birthday, about six years after moving to the West Coast, Richardson was picked to play the fourth-oldest child in the Bradford family on Eight Is Enough.

In her Eight Is Enough heyday, Richardson appeared in two installments of Battle of the Network Stars (May 1979 and December 1980), as well as numerous appearances on The $20,000 Pyramid, Password Plus, and Match Game, in addition to a one-hour All-Star episode of Family Feud in 1978 and a three-episode celebrity tournament on the daytime version in May 1979.

== Personal life ==
On March 15, 1978, Richardson married Michael Virden, and shortly thereafter became pregnant, which was also written into Eight Is Enough. She gave birth to their daughter, Sarah, on February 27, 1980. After her pregnancy, a rumor was spread that Richardson would lose her job if she did not shed her pregnancy weight; she had gained 90 lb (41 kg). Finding it very difficult to slim down by normal means, she started using cocaine.

In December 1987, Richardson claimed that she was held captive in South Korea.

In January 2013, The Huffington Post published a report from a National Enquirer interview with Richardson. She reported she had experienced extremely hard times, living in an unheated trailer with a rotting floor in Wagontown, Pennsylvania, not far from her hometown of Coatesville. Richardson said she had developed diabetes, suffered three mini-strokes, had lost 60 lb (27 kg), and lost her teeth as the result of a digestive condition.

== Filmography ==
Film and television
Year	Title	Role	Notes
1973	American Graffiti	Judy	
1974	Nakia	Nancy	Episode: "A Matter of Choice"
1975	The Streets of San Francisco	Marlene Hollander	Episode "The Programming of Charlie Blake"
1975	Happy Days	Carol Danson	Episode: "Fonzie Joins the Band"
1976	A Star Is Born	Groupie	
1977	The McLean Stevenson Show	Sharlene	Episode: "The Great Rift"
1977–81	Eight Is Enough	Susan Bradford Stockwell	112 episodes
1979	The Runaways	Kathleen Randolph	Episode: "Screams in the Night"
1981	The Love Boat	Emily Parker	Episode: "He's My Brother/Zeke and Zelda/Teach Me Tonight"
1982	Fantasy Island	Ellen	Episode: "The Magic Camera/Mata Hari/Valerie"
1982	CHiPs	Snow Pink	Episode: "Battle of the Bands"
1982	One Day at a Time	Eloise	Episodes: "The Honeymoon Is Over", "First Things First"
1987	Eight Is Enough: A Family Reunion	Susan Bradford	TV movie
1987	Soldiers of Innocence	Sister Elizabeth	
1989	An Eight Is Enough Wedding	Susan Bradford	TV movie
