= Arch Whiting =

American television actor

- Born: Harold Joseph Archambault; September 29, 1936; Larchmont, New York, U.S.
- Died: May 7, 2007 (aged 70); Black Mountain, North Carolina, U.S.
- Occupation: Television actor
- Years active: 1950s–1976

Harold Joseph Archambault (September 29, 1936 – May 7, 2007) was an American television actor. He was known for playing radio engineer Sparks in the American science fiction television series Voyage to the Bottom of the Sea.

== Life and career ==
Whiting was born in Larchmont, New York. He began his career in the 1950s, where Whiting worked as a production assistant on the variety television program The Ed Sullivan Show. Whiting studied acting with Sanford Meisner. In 1959, he appeared in the television series Paradise Kid, in which Whiting said that, "it was a flop". He continued his career, mainly appearing on television, as his credits includes, The Fugitive, Mannix, Land of the Giants, The F.B.I., Star Trek: The Original Series, Joe Forrester, Cannon, Garrison's Gorillas, Run for Your Life, Barnaby Jones and The Bold Ones: The Lawyers.

Later in his career, Whiting co-starred in the science fiction television series Voyage to the Bottom of the Sea, where he played the role of the radio engineer Sparks. He was hired by creator, Irwin Allen. Whiting then co-starred in the new NBC television series Run, Joe, Run, where he played the role of Sgt. William Corey.

== Death ==
Whiting died on May 7, 2007 in Black Mountain, North Carolina, at the age of 70.
