= Harvey Laidman =

American television director (1942–2025)

- Born: Harvey S. Laidman; February 22, 1942; Cleveland, Ohio, U.S.
- Died: January 3, 2025 (aged 82); Simi Valley, California, U.S.
- Occupation: Television director

Harvey S. Laidman (February 22, 1942 – January 3, 2025) was an American television director. He directed for television programs including Magnum, P.I., The Waltons, Tales of the Gold Monkey, Matlock, The Dukes of Hazzard, Quantum Leap, Eight Is Enough, Jake and the Fatman, Quincy, M.E., Knight Rider and Hawaii Five-O.

Laidman died from cancer in Simi Valley, California, on January 3, 2025, at the age of 82.
