= Cindy Robbins =

American actress

Cynthia Chenault
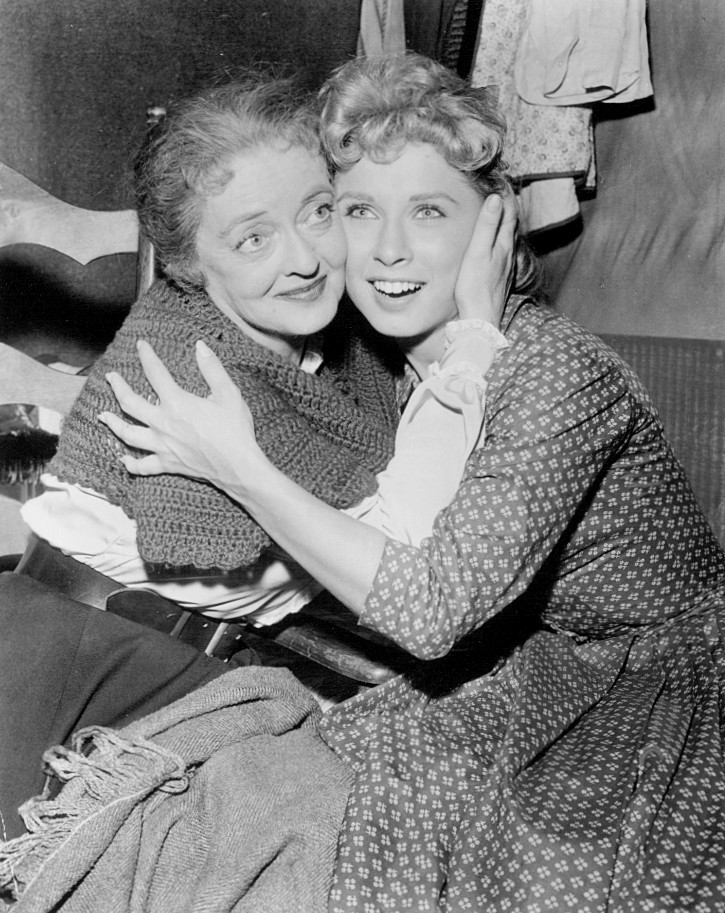
- Robbins with Bette Davis in Wagon Train, 1959
- Born: Cynthia Robichaux; January 5, 1937 (age 89); Hammond, Louisiana, U.S.
- Occupations: Actor, television producer & writer
- Years active: 1955–present
- Spouses: Tommy Leonetti (m. 1964–1979) (his death) Robert Chenault (m. 1983–2009) (his death)
- Children: Kimberly Beck

Cynthia Chenault (née Robichaux) is an American television actress and producer/writer active from the mid-1950s to the present. She used the screen name Cindy Robbins in her acting credits.

== Early years ==
Robbins was born Cynthia Robichaux in Hammond, Louisiana. Her mother operated a dancing school in Pascagoula, Mississippi, and Robbins began dancing at age five. When she was eight years old, her family moved to California. When she was a student at Glendale High School, her career plans changed from dancing to acting. In 1952, she was the school's representative at an annual drama festival. She has four sisters. She is of French descent.

== Career ==
=== Stage ===
Robbins's entertainment debut came in Ken Murray's Blackouts when she was 11 years old. On Broadway, she portrayed Molly Belmont in By the Beautiful Sea (1954), and Janice Dawson in Happy Town (1959). She also had a lead role in The Vacant Lot at the La Jolla Playhouse.

=== Television ===
Her first acting role on television was in 1955, in the episode Moonfire of the television western series Brave Eagle. In 1960, Robbins appeared as a ballerina in the "Bullets and Ballet" episode of Tightrope!.

Her last acting role in television was on the television comedy series McHale's Navy in 1964.

Her best-known role was that of Carol Porter, one of the daughters in the one-season situation comedy The Tom Ewell Show (1960–61). She also made two guest appearances on Perry Mason, including the role of Teddi Hart in the 1960 episode "The Case of the Treacherous Toupee" and the role of Mabel Richmond in the 1962 episode "The Case of Melancholy Marksman".

Her other television work consisted of appearances in comedy shows (Ensign O'Toole, Father Knows Best, The Adventures of Ozzie and Harriet, Leave It to Beaver), McHale's Navy and military/action shows (Steve Canyon, Whirlybirds, Harbor Command), westerns (Wagon Train, The Tall Man), and dramas (Westinghouse Desilu Playhouse, Tightrope!, Dragnet).

=== Film ===
She appeared in several films from 1957 to 1959:

- I Was a Teenage Werewolf (1957) playing Pearl, Vic's Girl
- Dino (1957), a Sal Mineo drama, playing Sylvia
- Rockabilly Baby (1957), a film about family secrets and small-town life (featuring Les Brown and His Band of Renown), playing Vougette #1
- Gunsight Ridge (1957), a Joel McCrea Western, playing the Bride
- This Earth Is Mine (1959), a Rock Hudson drama about California wine country, playing Buz Dietrick

=== Producing/writing ===
In the mid-1980s, she produced/wrote several ABC Weekend Specials (notably, Pippi Longstocking) and a CBS Schoolbreak Special. She was also a writer in 1984 for the TV cartoon series Heathcliff & the Catillac Cats.

== Personal life ==
She has one child, actress Kimberly Beck.

Cynthia, then still known as Cindy Robbins, married New Jersey singer-songwriter Tommy Leonetti on November 27, 1965, in Beverly Hills, California.
