= I Cried =

"I Cried" is a popular song written by Michael Elias and Billy Duke.

The best-selling version was done by Patti Page, reaching number 13 on the Billboard chart in 1954. It was released by Mercury Records as catalog number 70416. The song was a two-sided hit, with the flip side "What a Dream" doing even better on the chart. It entered the chart on September 1, 1954, and stayed on for three weeks, peaking at number 26 on the Billboard Best Seller chart. Another version, by Tommy Leonetti, reached number 30 the same year. The song reached number 18 on the Cash Box best-selling record chart in that year.

The song was covered by Eddie Holman in his 1970 album, I Love You.
