= Westwind (TV series) =

- Genre: Children's adventure
- Created by: Richard M. Bluel; William P. D'Angelo
- Written by: Richard M. Bluel; William P. D'Angelo
- Directed by: Christian Nyby
- Starring: Van Williams; Niki Dantine; Kimberly Beck; Steve Burns; Thomas Asinsin; John Carradine
- Theme music composer: Richard LaSalle
- Country of origin: United States
- Original language: English
- No. of seasons: 1
- No. of episodes: 13

Production
- Producer: William P. D'Angelo
- Running time: 30 min
- Production company: William P. D'Angelo Productions

Original release
- Network: NBC
- Release: September 6 – November 29, 1975

Westwind is a 1975 young adult television action drama on the NBC Saturday morning line up. The show chronicled the adventures of the Andrews family as they sailed the ocean on their yacht. It ran for one season with a total of 13 episodes produced.

== Premise ==
The show was named for the twin masted yacht, Westwind. The plot of the show concentrated on a scientist/photographer couple and their two teenage children sailing around the islands of the Pacific, finding danger and adventure.

== Cast ==
The cast included:

- Van Williams as Steve Andrews
- Niki Dantine as Kate Andrews
- Steve Burns as Tom Andrews
- Kimberly Beck as Robin Andrews
- Thomas Asinsin as Keoki

John Carradine appeared in two episodes as Captain Hooks.

== Production ==
The show was known for its lush photography on land and underwater by Lamar Borem. Borem was the photographer for the television series Flipper. The show was filmed in Hawaii and its introduction was narrated by voice actor Paul Frees. The show was produced by William P. D'Angelo Productions, who were responsible for another NBC live-action children's drama, Run, Joe, Run. The show did moderately well in terms of ratings but was canceled because of high production costs as compared to the standard production cost of the other Saturday morning shows.

Network censors demanded that no cleavage should be shown by girls wearing bikinis. The show's producers added inserts to the bikini tops that ended up drawing more attention to the girls' chests.

== Episodes ==
No.	Title	Original release date
1	"Shark"	September 6, 1975
2	"The Menehunes"	September 13, 1975
3	"Terror Beach"	September 20, 1975
4	"Killer Kahuna"	September 27, 1975
5	"Captain Hooks and The Crooks"	October 4, 1975
6	"The Sea Jackals"	October 11, 1975
7	"Tutu Kane and the Shark God"	October 18, 1975
8	"The Deadly Photo"	October 25, 1975
9	"Web of Mystery"	November 1, 1975
10	"The Night Marchers"	November 8, 1975
11	"The Sea Snakes"	November 15, 1975
12	"Captain Hooks and the Aborigines"	November 22, 1975
13	"Ransom at Makena Bay"	November 29, 1975
