= Eight Is Enough =

American comedy-drama television series (1977–1981)

- Genre: Comedy drama
- Based on: Eight Is Enough by Tom Braden
- Developed by: William Blinn
- Starring: Dick Van Patten; Diana Hyland; Betty Buckley; Grant Goodeve; Lani O'Grady; Laurie Walters; Susan Richardson; Dianne Kay; Connie Newton; Willie Aames; Adam Rich
- Theme music composer: Fred Werner (Season 1 & 2 opening theme); Song: from Season 3 onwards – "Eight Is Enough" Music by Lee Holdridge; Lyrics by Molly-Ann Leikin
- Composers: John Beal; Alexander Courage; Earle Hagen; Miles Goodman
- Country of origin: United States
- Original language: English
- No. of seasons: 5
- No. of episodes: 112

Production
- Executive producers: Philip Capice; Lee Rich
- Producers: Robert L. Jacks; Gary Adelson; Greg Strangis; Phil Fehrle
- Camera setup: Single-camera
- Running time: 50 minutes
- Production company: Lorimar Productions

Original release
- Network: ABC
- Release: March 15, 1977 – May 23, 1981

Related
- Eight Is Enough: A Family Reunion (1987); Eight Is Enough: A Wedding (1989)

Eight Is Enough is an American comedy-drama television series that aired on ABC from March 15, 1977, to May 23, 1981. The show was modeled on the life of syndicated newspaper columnist Tom Braden (Tom Bradford on the show), a real-life parent with eight children, who wrote a book by the same title.

== Synopsis ==
The show centers on a Sacramento, California, family with eight children (from oldest to youngest: 22-year-old David, 21-year-old Mary, 20-year-old Joanie, 19-year-old Susan, 18-year-old Nancy, 16-year-old Elizabeth, 15-year-old Tommy, and 8-year-old Nicholas). The father, Tom Bradford (Dick Van Patten), is a newspaper columnist for the fictional Sacramento Register. His wife Joan, based on Joan Braden, was a homemaker and took care of the children.

Joan was played by Diana Hyland (born Diane Gentner) and in early 1977, she was diagnosed with breast cancer. While performing a mastectomy, doctors discovered her cancer had metastasized. During filming her health suddenly deteriorated, and Hyland died on March 27, 1977, having filmed only four episodes. As a result, her character's death was written into the second season of the series.

The second season begins in the fall of 1977 with Tom as a widower. He eventually meets and falls in love with Sandra Sue "Abby" Abbott (Betty Buckley), a widowed schoolteacher who comes to the house to tutor Tommy after he breaks his leg in a football game. Abby and Tom marry in one of the series' TV movie broadcasts on November 9, 1977. The role went to Buckley after being approved by network chief Brandon Tartikoff, who felt that the character of Miss Collins, the sympathetic high school gym teacher she had played in the 1976 film Carrie, would translate seamlessly to the series.

In the fourth season, in another of the series' TV movie broadcasts in September 1979, both David and Susan get married in a double wedding. As the series progresses, Abby receives her Ph.D. in education and starts a job counseling students at the local high school; oldest son David starts his own construction company; second-eldest daughter Joanie works as a TV producer; eldest daughter Mary becomes a medical doctor; third daughter Susan marries a baseball player, Merle "The Pearl" Stockwell, and has a baby; second-youngest son Tommy becomes a musician in a rock-and-roll band. Ralph Macchio also joins the cast as Jeremy Andretti, Abby's orphaned nephew.

== Cast and characters ==
=== Main ===
- Dick Van Patten as Thomas "Tom" Bradford Sr.
- Diana Hyland as Joan Wells Bradford (season 1)
- Betty Buckley as Sandra Sue "Abby" Mitchell Abbott Bradford (seasons 2–5)
- Grant Goodeve as David Bradford
- Lani O'Grady as Mary Bradford
- Laurie Walters as Joan "Joanie" Bradford
- Susan Richardson as Susan Bradford Stockwell
- Dianne Kay as Nancy Bradford
- Connie Newton/Needham as Elizabeth Bradford (switched to new married name, Needham, at start of season 4)
- Willie Aames as Thomas "Tommy" Bradford Jr.
- Adam Rich as Nicholas Bradford

In the pilot (filmed in April 1976), the role of David was played by Mark Hamill, Nancy was played by Kimberly Beck, and Tommy was played by Chris English. When ABC screened the pilot, they were reportedly unhappy with the performances of Beck and English, who were let go and replaced by Dianne Kay and Willie Aames. After the pilot initially failed to sell, Beck wanted to play a prominent role on the ABC miniseries Rich Man, Poor Man Book II, so the network granted her a release from her Eight Is Enough contract. Hamill sought to get out of his five-year contract on Eight Is Enough to take the film opportunities that followed his starring role as Luke Skywalker in George Lucas's Star Wars. After Hamill injured his face in a car crash, Lorimar Productions granted his request and the role was re-cast with Grant Goodeve.

The cast of Eight Is Enough (seasons 2–5) Top row (left to right): Kay, Van Patten, Goodeve, and Walters Middle row: Richardson, Newton, and Buckley Bottom row: Rich, O'Grady, and Aames

=== Recurring ===
- Jennifer Darling as Donna (1977–1981)
- Michael Thoma as Dr. Greg Maxwell (1977–1981)
- Virginia Vincent as Daisy Maxwell (1977–1981)
- Janis Paige as Vivian "Auntie V" Bradford (1977–1980)
- Joan Prather as Janet McArthur Bradford (1979–1981)
- Brian Patrick Clarke as Merle "The Pearl" Stockwell (1979–1981)
- Ralph Macchio as Jeremy Andretti (1980–1981)
- Micheal Goodrow as Ernie Fields (1979–1981)
- James Karen as Eliot Randolph (1978–1981)
- Michele Greene as Jill (1980–1981)
- Nicholas Pryor as Jeffrey Trout (1979–1981)
- Jack Elam as Joe Simon (1978-1980)

== Production ==
The show was developed by writer William Blinn and was a Lorimar Production. It was originally distributed by Worldvision Enterprises. The show's team of producers included Robert L. Jacks, Gary Adelson, Greg Strangis, and Phil Fehrle. Executive producers were Lee Rich and Philip Capice.

The home featured in the exterior shots was on Chiquita Street near Lankershim Boulevard in Studio City, Los Angeles. The house has since been demolished and replaced. For the first three years the show filmed interior scenes at The Burbank Studios now known as the Warner Bros. Ranch. From the fourth season the show filmed interiors at MGM Studios in Culver City.

As a production of the Lorimar stable, who were concurrently producing CBS's The Waltons, writers were often contracted by the producers and were shared between both programs. (Waltons co-star Will Geer also made an Eight Is Enough guest appearance during season 2.) Regular writers included Peter Lefcourt, the writing teams of Gwen Bagni and Paul Dubov, Rod Peterson and Claire Whittaker, Bill Nuss and Dusty Kay (brother of "Nancy Bradford" Dianne Kay), Nick Thiel and David Braff, J. Miyoko Hensley and Steven Hensley, Bruce Shelly, Sandra Kay Siegel, Gil Grant, Karen I. Hall, and Hindi Brooks, who soon became the show's long-time story editor. In-house directors included Philip Leacock, Harry Harris, and Irving J. Moore. As an in-joke, the character name of one of Nicholas Bradford's best friends was Irving Julius Moore, a nod to the director of the same name whose middle name was, in fact, Joseph.

== Music ==
=== Theme ===
For the show's first two seasons, an upbeat instrumental piece written by Fred Werner was used as the show's opening theme. Beginning with the show's third season, this was replaced by a slowed-down vocal theme titled "Eight Is Enough," which was sung by series co-star Grant Goodeve. The song had music by Lee Holdridge and lyrics by Molly-Ann Leikin, and was first heard in a longer arrangement on the last episode of the second season titled "Who's on First?", which was also performed by Goodeve.

=== Score ===
Early episodes had instrumental music by Fred Werner and Alexander Courage, but the show's real musical stamp came from composer Earle Hagen, who had a knack of composing memorable cues as he had previously been the in-house composer on The Andy Griffith Show. He composed a love theme for Tom and Abby, a theme that permeated the show in various incarnations throughout the remainder of the series. Some later episodes were scored by John Beal and Miles Goodman.

Back-to-back industry strikes in the show's last seasons affected the show's score, with both the 1980 SAG actors' strike and 1981 writers' strike forcing cost-cutting measures. Some of the later episodes were tracked with a combination of uncredited library music and original music by Hagen, Beal, and Goodman.

== Reception and cancellation ==
The series jump-started acting careers for several of its young stars. It cemented teen idol status for Grant Goodeve (David), Willie Aames (Tommy), and Ralph Macchio, who played Abby's orphaned nephew Jeremy later in the show's last season. Aames went on to star with Scott Baio in Charles in Charge. Goodeve started a minor singing career, following his rendition of the show's theme song, and initially hosted HGTV's If Walls Could Talk. Macchio gained the most fame in feature films, such as The Karate Kid and its sequels as well as My Cousin Vinny.

After the end of the show's fifth season (112 one-hour episodes), production costs and declining ratings caused the show to be cancelled with seven other shows that season (including The Waltons). Variety's headline on the cancellation stated "Eight Shows In, Eight Shows Out". In a 2000 episode of E! True Hollywood Story, Dick Van Patten stated that no one contacted him to inform him of the cancellation. Instead, he read about it in a newspaper.

The series had two reunion movies on NBC. In Eight Is Enough: A Family Reunion on October 18, 1987, Mary Frann replaced Betty Buckley as Abby; Buckley had been filming Frantic during its production. Then came An Eight Is Enough Wedding on October 15, 1989, this time with Sandy Faison as Abby. Both movies aired opposite Game 2 of the World Series on ABC.

== Nielsen Ratings ==
- 1976–1977 — #23
- 1977–1978 — #12
- 1978–1979 — #11
- 1979–1980 — #12
- 1980–1981 — Not in Top 30

== Series overview ==
Season	Episodes	Originally released	
Season	Episodes	First released	Last released
1	9	March 15, 1977	August 10, 1977
2	26	September 14, 1977	May 10, 1978
3	27	September 6, 1978	May 23, 1979
4	28	September 5, 1979	April 30, 1980
5	22	October 29, 1980	May 23, 1981

== Episodes ==
=== Season 1 (1977) ===
No. overall	No. in season	Title	Directed by	Written by	Original release date
1	1	"Never Try Eating Nectarines Since Juice May Dispense"	E. W. Swackhamer	William Blinn	March 15, 1977
Pilot episode: After 15-year-old Elizabeth is arrested for the possession of narcotics, Tom and Joan Bradford are faced with the dual problems of raising money for her defense and trying to understand why 21-year-old David Bradford moved away from home after objecting to the way they handled the drug bust. Note: In the Pilot, David was played by Mark Hamill, Nancy was played by Kimberly Beck, and Tommy played by Chris English. When ABC picked up the show, they were recast, respectively, with Grant Goodeve, Dianne Kay, and Willie Aames.
2	2	"Schussboomer"	David Moessinger	Norman Lessing	March 22, 1977
Tom and Joan are reluctant to let Susan go away for an unchaperoned ski weekend; Mary's unwed pregnant friend stays with the Bradfords.
3	3	"Pieces of Eight"	Reza Badiyi	Greg Strangis	March 29, 1977
Tom is forced to face a newspaper strike, a wife who wants a job, and a daughter who wants to become a model.
4	4	"Women, Ducks, and the Domino Theory"	Vincent McEveety	Peter Lefcourt	April 5, 1977
Tommy falls in love for the first time and learns life's most difficult lesson; some of the Bradfords question the time-honored tradition of an annual duck-hunting trip. Notes: Main cast member Diana Hyland does not appear in this episode. Charlene Tilton (as Wendy Spring) guest stars.
5	5	"Turnabout"	Harvey S. Laidman	Katharyn Powers	April 12, 1977
David's romance with an older woman becomes a topic for argument; the family plans a surprise anniversary party for the Maxwells. Notes: 1) Adrienne Barbeau (as Jennifer Linden) special guest stars. 2) Fourth and final appearance of main cast member Diana Hyland, who died March 27, 1977. 3) Originally scheduled for March 29, 1977, two days after Hyland's death.
6	6	"Quarantine"	Harry Harris	Gwen Bagni & Paul Dubov	April 19, 1977
When Mary's new boyfriend is hospitalized with an exotic illness, the Bradford family and a visitor are questioned by the health department.
7	7	"V Is for Vivian"	Harry Harris	Rod Peterson & Claire Whitaker	April 26, 1977
Tom's swinging sister visits, exciting and influencing the kids to live for the moment. Note: Janis Paige (as Auntie V) guest stars, and subsequently becomes a recurring character throughout the series.
8	8	"Hit and Run"	Ralph Senensky	C. Robert Brooks and Robert L. McCullough	May 3, 1977
Tom finds that Joanie has been blackmailed into asking for a retraction in his newspaper column after she crumples the fender on a classic sports car; Tommy pays penance for breaking a church window; Elizabeth makes multiple dates for a school dance. Notes: Peter Coffield and Molly Dodd guest star.
9	9	"The Gipper Caper"	William F. Claxton	William Blinn	August 10, 1977
Filming date: February 23 – March 4, 1977; A football game becomes a blood-and-guts event. Note: This episode's working title was "What Hath Roone Arledge Wrought?" This was held back by ABC until the show moved to Wednesday nights, after the series was picked up for the fall schedule.

=== Season 2 (1977–78) ===
No. overall	No. in season	Title	Directed by	Written by	Original release date	Prod. code
10	1	"Is There a Doctor in the House?"	Harry Harris	Story by : Gwen Bagni & Paul Dubov & John Kubichan; Teleplay by : Gwen Bagni & Paul Dubov	September 14, 1977	188367
The widowed Tom and the temporarily single Doctor Maxwell try their luck as middle-aged swinging singles; the kids cull their meager finances together to help David pay off a gambling debt. Beth Howland appears in this episode.
11	2	"Trial Marriage"	Philip Leacock	Leonard Stadd & Toni Van Horne	September 21, 1977	188366
Tom disapproves when Mary moves in with her boyfriend. Enter a teacher named Sandra Sue "Abby" Abbott to sort all this out while tutoring Tommy. Note: Don Johnson (as Doug, Mary's boyfriend) guest stars. Betty Buckley's (as Sandra Sue "Abby" Abbott) first appearance.
12	3	"Triangles"	Philip Leacock	Bruce Shelly	September 28, 1977	188368
David's roommate dates both Joanie and Susan; Tom spends quality time with Nicholas as well as goes on his first official date with Abby; Tommy hosts a garage sale. Note: John Shea (as Jonathan Moracci, David's roommate) guest stars.
13	4	"Double Trouble"	Harry Harris	Joyce Perry	October 5, 1977	188379
Problems develop when Tom and Abby break up and he begins dating divorcee Ellen Manning; Nancy enters a beauty contest; David attempts to meet women at a laundromat.
14	5	"Mortgage Burnin' Blues"	William Wiard	Parke Perine	October 19, 1977	188372
A party at the Bradfords' spirals out of control; Nicholas tries to get arrested in order to be paid attention to. Gerald McRaney appears in this episode.
15	6	"Dark Horse"	Harry Harris	Bill Nuss & Dusty Kay	October 26, 1977	188369
Tom and Abby decide to get married after having put aside their own problems to help Mary run for the board of education.
16	7	"The Bard and the Bod"	Irving J. Moore	Michael Weinberger	November 2, 1977	188373
The family tries to hide from Tom Joanie's upcoming nudity onstage in a local Shakespearean production; David purchases jewelry from a co-worker, not knowing it is stolen.
17	8	"Children of the Groom"	Philip Leacock	Hindi Brooks	November 9, 1977	188377A-188377B
18	9	"Children of the Groom"	Philip Leacock	Hindi Brooks	November 9, 1977	188377A-188377B
Tom and Abby decide to marry despite complications caused by his children. Note: Louise Latham (as Katherine Mitchell, Abby’s mother), Dennis Patrick (as Harry Mitchell, Abby’s father) and Sylvia Sidney (as Evelin, Abby’s aunt) guest star. Note: This was a special 2-hour episode; syndicated versions of this episode split it into two hour-long parts, cutting some scenes out.
19	10	"I Quit"	David Swift	Greg Strangis	November 16, 1977	188382
Tom Bradford "resigns" as father when the kids accuse him of being a dictator. Nevertheless, the family members travel to San Francisco for their own individual reasons.
20	11	"All's Fair in Love and War"	David Swift	Story by : Matt Robinson; Teleplay by : Marion Hargrove	November 23, 1977	188370
Tom's liberal attitudes are put to the test when Mary dates the black son of his old military friend; Nicholas tries to avoid confronting bullies at school; the girls try to hire a maid for the household. Note: Dorian Harewood (as Colonel Richard Connelly) guest stars.
21	12	"The Return of Auntie V"	Ray Marsh	Rod Peterson & Claire Whitaker	November 30, 1977	188381
Tom's flamboyant sister gives the newlyweds the down-payment on a new mansion. Note: Janis Paige (as Aunt Vivian) guest stars.
22	13	"Yes, Nicholas, There is a Santa Claus"	Harry Harris	Hindi Brooks	December 14, 1977	188374-A/B
23	14	"Yes, Nicholas, There is a Santa Claus"	Harry Harris	Hindi Brooks	December 14, 1977	188374-A/B
A present Joan hid before her death restores the Bradfords' spirit after a Christmas burglar steals their gifts. Note: This was a special 2-hour episode; syndicated versions of this episode split it into two hour-long parts, cutting some scenes out. Will Geer and Judy Strangis guest-star.
24	15	"A Hair of the Dog"	Alf Kjellin	Peter Lefcourt	January 4, 1978	188383
On Tom's birthday, the family gives him a unique present; Tommy uses David's empty apartment for a drunken party. Danny Bonaduce appears in this episode.
25	16	"Author! Author!"	Irving J. Moore	David Hurwitz & Larry Arnstein	January 11, 1978	188384
Tom receives unexpected resistance from his family when he decides to write a novel.
26	17	"Much Ado About Garbage"	Harvey S. Laidman	Story by : Parke Perine & Robert Holt; Teleplay by : Greg Strangis & Peter Lefcourt	January 18, 1978	188389
Tom has been suspended from his job without pay after accusing the city officials and garbage company of corruption and refusing to reveal his sources to a grand jury; Nicholas is caught in the middle of a controversy over his new BB gun.
27	18	"Dear Miss Dinah"	Irving J. Moore	Story by : Paul Dubov & Gwen Bagni and Carole & Michael Raschella; Teleplay by : Paul Dubov & Gwen Bagni	January 25, 1978	188371
Tom doles out sage advice in the hometown newspaper's advice-to-the-lovelorn column but loses his cool when Elizabeth asks if she should take "The Pill"; Abby takes a leave of absence from her job, upsetting her relationship with Tom; David gives Tommy lessons in auto shop.
28	19	"Hard Hats and Hard Heads"	Barry Crane	Story by : Gary Adelson; Teleplay by : Gary Adelson and Greg Strangis & Peter Lefcourt	February 1, 1978	188390
Encouraged by his friend's success, David trades in his hard hat for a newsman's notepad; Joanie, Nancy and Susan try to out-diet one another; Tommy tries out for the football team.
29	20	"Seven Days in February"	Irving J. Moore	Bill Nuss & Dusty Kay	February 8, 1978	188386
Dating woes: Nancy decides to convert to Judaism when she falls in love with a man she believes is Jewish; Susan falls for a bore; Joanie is attracted to a sullen poet; David reluctantly agrees to a blind date.
30	21	"The Boyfriend"	Earl Bellamy	Story by : Robert L. McCullough & Joel Tappis; Teleplay by : Larry Arnstein & David Hurwitz	February 15, 1978	188388
Susan's boyfriend and Abby are suspected of having an affair when they work together on a project; Tommy and his friend try to gain access to the girls' locker room at school; Nicholas is appointed "Water Monitor" of the household.
31	22	"Great Expectations"	Arnold Laven	Bruce Shelly	February 22, 1978	188391
Tommy cheats in school in order to meet his father's expectations; the kids pool together their money to buy another car; Joanie directs her first play...at Nicholas' elementary school.
32	23	"Long Night's Journey into Day"	Philip Leacock	Greg Strangis & Gary Adelson & Peter Lefcourt	March 1, 1978	188394
Members of the Bradford family are forced to take shifts to keep Abby awake for 24 hours after she falls and suffers a concussion. Note: This show is a retrospective, composed largely of scenes from past episodes. Nicholas does an on-camera introduction.
33	24	"The Lost Weekend"	Harry Harris	Peter Lefcourt & Greg Strangis	April 28, 1978	188393
The Bradford children quickly transform an idyllic holiday away from parents.
34	25	"Poor Little Rich Girl"	Philip Leacock	Story by : Kathy Donnell & Madeline DiMaggio; Teleplay by : Kathy Donnell & Madeline DiMaggio and Paul M. Belous & Robert Wolterstorff	May 3, 1978	188395
Filming date: February 8–17, 1978; The self-assured daughter of a prominent contractor showers David with expensive gifts in an attempt to buy his affections; Joanie forces her new-found philosophy on the family; Tom and Nicholas build a go-kart in the garage.
35	26	"Who's on First?"	Ray Marsh	Bill Nuss & Dusty Kay	May 10, 1978	188392
The Bradfords stage a talent show to support a local orphanage; Nicholas runs away from home, making it as far as David's apartment. Note: The first appearance of the season three theme song, as performed by David during the talent show.

=== Season 3 (1978–79) ===
No. overall	No. in season	Title	Directed by	Written by	Original release date	Prod. code
36	1	"Who's Crazy Here?"	Harry Harris	J. Miyoko Hensley & Steven Hensley	September 6, 1978	
Tom secretly sees a psychiatrist, which makes Abby fear Tom is having an affair and the kids fear their father has heart trouble; Tommy takes the definition of "double-date" to a whole other level.
37	2	"Nine is Too Much"	Stan Lathan	Teleplay by : Bruce Shelly & Peter Lefcourt and Shirl Hendryx; Story by : Shirl Hendryx & Earle Doud & John Agnew	September 13, 1978	188655
When Abby manages Nicholas' Little League team, Tom provides unwanted coaching from the bleachers, and America's favorite pastime becomes the Bradfords' biggest headache; the girls lobby for more phone lines in the household.
38	3	"Here We Go Again!" "Oh, No...Not Again!"	Arnold Laven	Peter Lefcourt	September 20, 1978	188664
All the Bradfords wonder if there is going to be a new Bradford; Tom is audited by the IRS; Joanie begins talking to her plants; Nancy becomes a telemarketer; Nicholas plays "post office" with a girl at school.
39	4	"Cinderella's Understudy"	Marc Daniels	Nick Thiel & David Braff	September 27, 1978	188656
Joanie's debut as an actress becomes a conflict of interests for Tom, torn between his role of proud parent, and his unexpected role as theater critic; Abby is reluctant to allow the kids to drive her antique MG; Susan meets a guy more attracted to the MG than to her; Nicholas tries to avoid a schoolgirl who cannot stop calling him at home.
40	5	"Milk and Sympathy"	Irving J. Moore	Barbara Elaine Smith	October 11, 1978	188654
Nicholas falls head-over-heels in puppy love with his fourth-grade teacher; the family acquires a painting that may be a lost masterpiece; Tommy has a case of trenchmouth before a hot date.
41	6	"The Flunked and the Funked"	Irving J. Moore	Bruce Shelly	October 18, 1978	188653
Nancy drops out of school to get a job and finds that excitement and wealth are not part of the life of an unskilled worker; Tom begins teaching a journalism class; Nicholas and his friend make crank calls.
42	7	"Cops and Toddlers"	Irving J. Moore	Sandra Kay Siegel	October 25, 1978	188658
Nancy brings home a group of toddlers for her nursery job; Susan gets rejected at the police academy; Joanie inadvertently meddles in David's personal life. Corey Feldman appears in this episode.
43	8	"The Hipbone's Connected to the Thighbone"	Irving J. Moore	Parke Perine	November 1, 1978	188659
Mary is frustrated with what she perceives as sexism in medical school; Tommy is anxious to earn his driver's license; Nicholas learns how to flip cards.
44	9	"Fast and Loose"	Stan Lathan	Greg Strangis	November 8, 1978	188666
David struggles to cope with the loss of a close friend, and ends up being arrested for bar-room brawling; Nicholas takes in a stray cat. Note: This is the first appearance of recurring character Janet McArthur, the future Mrs. David Bradford (and future divorcée). She is played by Meridith Baer in this episode, but from her next appearance in "Moving Out" onward, the character is played by Joan Prather.
45	10	"War Between the Bradfords"	Harry Harris	Dusty Kay	November 15, 1978	
Abby's schoolboard speech on modern women in society creates a Bradford battle of the sexes; Nancy's job as a gas station attendant comes with a lesson in male chauvinism as well.
46	11	"All the Vice-President's Men"	Harvey S. Laidman	Robert L. McCullough & Jacqueline Simmel-McKane	November 22, 1978	188663
Thanksgiving for the Bradford clan arrives in a storm of red tape when the Vice-President of the United States accepts an invitation from Nicholas to visit their home for the holiday; Tommy gets ripped off by a shifty used car salesman; Elizabeth considers getting a nose job.
47	12	"You Won't Have Nicholas to Kick Around Anymore"	Harry Harris	Hindi Brooks	November 29, 1978	188657
48	13	"You Won't Have Nicholas to Kick Around Anymore"	Harry Harris	Hindi Brooks	November 29, 1978	188657
When Nicholas accidentally starts a fire that destroys the celebration of Tom and Abby's first anniversary, the unhappy youngster leaves home in search of a new family. Notes: This was a special 2-hour episode; syndicated versions of this episode split it into two hour-long parts, cutting some scenes out. Jack Elam guest stars.
49	14	"Alone at Last"	Harvey S. Laidman	Teleplay by : J. Miyoko Hensley & Steven Hensley; Story by : Martin Roth	December 6, 1978	188652
After bundling their brood off to the mountains for a camping trip, Tom and Abby soon find their romantic weekend alone disturbed by too much peace and quiet. But first, household routines are disrupted by a precocious little girl Susan brings home from her daycare center.
50	15	"The Yearning Point"	Stan Lathan	Larry Arnstein & David Hurwitz	January 10, 1979	188660
Elizabeth's dream of going to a posh Eastern dance school conflicts with the Bradford household budget, not to mention her abilities; Nancy trains to be a hair stylist at home, with no Bradfords volunteering to be guinea pigs; Tommy becomes a con in order to score concert tickets.
51	16	"Moving Out"	Arnold Laven	Nick Thiel & David Braff	January 17, 1979	188671
When Tom gets upset about Susan's boyfriend taking a shower in the upstairs bathroom, Joanie coming in after curfew and Nancy sunbathing topless in the backyard, the girls move out of the house into their own apartment; Nicholas develops a complex about his stature. Notes: This was part one of a special 2-hour episode (part two bearing the title, "Mother's Rule"); syndicated versions of this episode split it into two hour-long parts, cutting some scenes out. This is also Joan Prather's first appearance as Janet.
52	17	"Mother's Rule"	Earl Bellamy	Sandra Kay Siegel	January 17, 1979	188669
The second part of this two-hour episode deals with the fallout from Susan, Joanie and Nancy moving out: their collective first step into independence runs into a snag when it comes to sharing the apartment equally. Back at home, Tom abolishes all curfews, using reverse psychology to get the remaining Bradfords to honor theirs; this, too, goes awry. Note: This was part two of a special 2-hour episode (part one bearing the title, "Moving Out"); syndicated versions of this episode split it into two hour-long parts, cutting some scenes out.
53	18	"Inlaws and Outlaws"	Vincent McEveety	Bruce Shelly	January 24, 1979	188672
The mutiny by Susan, Joanie and Nancy continues, and Abby's parents announce their marital estrangement.
54	19	"Horror Story"	Irving J. Moore	Chris Manheim & Pat Green	January 31, 1979	188676
When a thunderstorm causes a power failure, the Bradford children use their vivid imaginations to transform the old homestead into a hysterical haunted house.
55	20	"Just the Ten of Us"	Stan Lathan	J. Miyoko Hensley & Steven Hensley	February 14, 1979	188673
When David and his girlfriend decide to live together, their decision threatens Tom's chance to win the "Father of the Year" award, along with an all-expenses-paid trip to Hawaii for the entire Bradford family; Tommy makes the van he inherits from David his own, inside and out.
56	21	"Best of Friends"	Gerald Mayer	David Braff & Nick Thiel	February 21, 1979	188676
Tommy rocks the Bradford family foundation with the shocking news of his impending marriage and fatherhood; Nicholas faces fierce competition from a rival lemonade stand around the block run by two girls. Rosanna Arquette and Tracey Gold (alongside younger sister Missy Gold) guest star.
57	22	"The Kid Who Came to Dinner"	Irving J. Moore	Chris Manheim & Pat Green	February 28, 1979	188678
When Nicholas discovers that his new playmate has no parents, the youngest Bradford tries to turn friendship into brotherhood; Abby and a colleague research the family for their psychology course.
58	23	"The Better Part of Valor"	Vincent McEveety	Dusty Kay	March 7, 1979	188674
Abby finds her relationship with Tommy threatened when she returns to teaching and flunks the school basketball star, causing Tommy -- and herself -- peer-group problems; Tom does what he can to avoid David's girlfriend's visiting, and very boring, parents. James Cromwell appears in this episode.
59	24	"Dads, Daughters, Different Drummers"	Robert L. Friend	Bruce Shelly	March 14, 1979	188679
When Tom forbids Joanie to see her new boyfriend, she runs away from home to be with the handsome young writer she loves; Tom hires David to remodel the living room; Nicholas' teacher recommends he take up a musical instrument.
60	25	"The Final Days"	Vincent McEveety	Nick Thiel & David Braff	May 2, 1979	188681
Tom's editorial, on "Passing the torch to a younger generation", ignites a Grey Power demonstration by Sacramento's indignant senior citizens...in the Bradford's front yard; Tommy tries to use Elizabeth's influence to book his band for her prom. Abe Vigoda guest stars.
61	26	"Marriage and Other Flights of Fancy"	Harry Harris	Greg Strangis	May 9, 1979	
62	27	"Marriage and Other Flights of Fancy"	Harry Harris	Greg Strangis	May 9, 1979	
David, despite the family's concern and his father's objections, teams up with an outspoken female in a cross-country quest for new beginnings; Tom's ego is deflated when his story gets published in an adult magazine. Note: This was a special 2-hour episode; syndicated versions of this episode split it into two hour-long parts, cutting some scenes out. Noah Beery Jr. guest stars.
63	28	"The Graduates"	Harry Harris	Sandra Kay Siegel	May 23, 1979	188682
Graduation is hardly what the Bradfords expected —- with Joanie upset over her future, Elizabeth suspended from her commencement exercises where her father is to be the guest speaker, and Tommy unable to decide what hairstyle to adopt next.

=== Season 4 (1979–80) ===
No. overall	No. in season	Title	Directed by	Written by	Original release date
64	1	"Merle the Pearl"	Stan Lathan	Nick Thiel & David Braff	September 5, 1979
Nicholas' plan to impress his girlfriend backfires when star pitcher Merle Stockwell (Brian Patrick Clarke, in his debut appearance) ignores them at the ballpark, but Merle falls for Susan instead; Tom tries to have the family conserve gas; Tommy's plan to set up his friend Ernie on a date backfires.
65	2	"The Cupid Crisis"	Leslie H. Martinson	Bruce Shelly	September 12, 1979
When Tom makes a "losers pay for the dinners" bet on a touch football game between his family and the Maxwells, it's a wild "hut, hut, hut". Complicating matters: David returns home, determined to win Janet back; and Merle wants to propose to Susan.
66	3	"I Do, I Do, I Do, I Do"	Harry Harris	Sandra Kay Siegel	September 19, 1979
David and Janet set a wedding date, which turns out to be the same day Merle and Susan choose, to accommodate Merle's ball-playing career move; Nancy delivers singing telegrams.
67	4	"Ten Ships in the Night"	Arnold Laven	Steven Hensley & J. Miyoko Hensley	September 26, 1979
When Abby decides to return to school full-time, Nicholas winds up left out with no one home after school; Nancy decides to seek out a more serious career.
68	5	"The Night They Raided Bradfords"	David Moessinger	Story by : Jock Paritz; Teleplay by : Chris Manheim & Pat Green	October 3, 1979
Merle's sister from Arkansas pays the Bradfords a visit, unaccustomed to the family's diverse eccentricities.
69	6	"The Devil and Mr. Bradford"	Arnold Laven	Gil Grant	October 24, 1979
Tom makes a hasty exit from a movie theater with little Nicholas in tow after he discovers too late that this version of "Snow White..." is X-rated; Mary finds a pregnancy test kit hidden in the linen closet; Joanie faces an existential crisis when assigned to a story at the local news station.
70	7	"Big Shoes, Little Feet"	Carl Kugel	Linda Elstad	October 31, 1979
Nicholas cuts school when his new teacher holds the successes of his siblings over his head as motivation; Tom's looking for a partner for a father-son golf tournament...only to come up one son short; Nancy burns the candle at both ends for David's sake.
71	8	"Fathers and Other Strangers"	Harry Harris	Gil Grant	November 7, 1979
72	9	"Fathers and Other Strangers"	Harry Harris	Gil Grant	November 7, 1979
Aunt Vivian comes up with a plan to take the entire Bradford clan to Hawaii. Her plan: to reunite Tom with their estranged father. Meanwhile, Tom clashes with Tommy over his schoolwork conflicting with his band. Notes: This was a special 2-hour episode; syndicated versions of this episode split it into two hour-long parts, cutting some scenes out. Janis Paige and David Wayne guest star.
73	10	"Letter to One Bradford"	Jack Bender	Story by : Juliet Packer; Teleplay by : Sandra Kay Siegel	November 14, 1979
Because he broke a chain letter, Nicholas believes he is to blame for the family's run of bad luck, culminating in Tommy being hospitalized; Nancy hosts a Chinese foreign exchange student.
74	11	"Separate Ways"	Jack Bender	Nick Thiel & David Braff	November 21, 1979
Susan and Merle reach an impasse regarding their careers; Tom is reluctant to let the women attempt to fix the household heater; Nicholas goes on strike, insisting on a higher allowance. Notes: This is part one of a two-part episode, concluded with the episode titled, "Arrivals." Jonathan Frakes guest stars.
75	12	"Arrivals"	Harry Harris	Bruce Shelly	November 28, 1979
Due to her separation from Merle, a depressed Susan comes home to the Bradfords...but the secret she's carrying is a surprise to the family; Joanie bonds with a practitioner of E.S.P.; Tommy uses Nicholas as a "babe magnet". Note: This is part two of a two-part episode, preceded by the earlier episode, "Separate Ways."
76	13	"Brotherhood, Sisterhood"	Harry Harris	Story by : Ken Berg & Mitzi McCall & Anne Convy; Teleplay by : Nick Thiel & David Braff	December 5, 1979
Tom convinces David to hire Tommy on at the construction company, but Tommy struggles as the boss's brother; Elizabeth seeks advice about making friends and meeting guys at college from her sisters, with unfortunate results; Tom brings Nicholas to work for a school report.
77	14	"Mary, He's Married"	Irving J. Moore	James Schmerer	December 12, 1979
Mary's friendship with a married doctor begins to develop into a romance; Nicholas dabbles in sales with face cream; Joanie tries to produce a documentary on her family for a promotion at work.
78	15	"My Son, The Prom Queen"	Irving J. Moore	Story by : Parke Perine; Teleplay by : Bruce Shelly	January 9, 1980
When Tommy gets embroiled in a battle of the sexes, he runs for the title of Prom Queen at his high school...and gets support from the female population at the school; Joanie has her say after a humiliating audition; Abby and Janet attempt to bond in a Bradford-less Sacramento -- a geographical impossibility.
79	16	"The Courage to Be"	Jack Bender	Story by : John Wirth; Teleplay by : Gil Grant	January 16, 1980
Tommy tries to help Ernie with his drinking problem; busy Abby and the Bradford girls pool their resources to hire a maid; Nicholas and his friend want to be "famous".
80	17	"Semi-Centennial Bradford"	Bernard McEveety	Story by : J. Miyoko Hensley & Steven Hensley & Max Hodge; Teleplay by : J. Miyoko Hensley & Steven Hensley	January 23, 1980
It's a less-than-happy 50th birthday for Tom when, already bothered by his age, he believes the newspaper is trying to replace him with a younger columnist; Nancy is keen to drop her current beau...until Elizabeth begins to show interest in him.
81	18	"The Commitment"	Jack Bender	Nick Thiel & David Braff	January 30, 1980
Tommy and his girlfriend Jill (Michele Greene) find their ideas of commitment do not necessarily match each other, as Tommy finds himself attracted to Mary's older friend; Nicholas tries to play Cupid for a friend, but finds himself as a target of unrequited love in return; Tom and David plan a surprise for Susan's baby shower. Markie Post guest stars.
82	19	"Seven More Days in February"	John Patterson	Gil Grant & Gary Adelson	February 6, 1980
Cupid runs amok in the Bradford household during Spring Break, causing Mary to fall for a young psychiatrist who really wants to be a stand-up comic, Nancy to swoon over an archaeologist on his way to his first dig and Joanie to be swept away by an S.A.P. (self-analysis programmer).
83	20	"The Return of Joe Simons"	Jack Bender	Bruce Shelly	February 13, 1980
Tom questions the motives of both Joe Simons (promising Nicholas gold nuggets) and his new secretary (promising Tom eternal devotion); Joanie tries in vain to come up with an on-camera gimmick for David's fledgling business. Jack Elam returns as Joe Simons.
84	21	"Bradford vs. Bradford"	Leslie H. Martinson	Nick Thiel & David Braff	February 27, 1980
Janet and David's marriage is threatened when she starts working overtime at the office with a handsome lawyer; Tommy doesn't like the idea of Ernie hanging out with Elizabeth; Nicholas learns to appreciate what he has via his schoolfriend Jackson.
85	22	"Memories"	Vincent McEveety	Channing Gibson	March 5, 1980
A visiting ex-POW revives painful memories for Abby, who leaves for Carmel to make peace with the past; Nicholas goes steady with a girl who seems to like his present to her more than she likes him; Nancy gets tired of loaning money out to her siblings.
86	23	"Official Positions"	Leslie H. Martinson	Paul Schneider & Margaret Schneider	March 19, 1980
Tough coach Merle recruits the girls for a charity basketball team; Tom gets jealous when a publisher offers to publish Abby's thesis instead of his book; Nicholas gets his friend Jackson's mom a job helping with Abby's book.
87	24	"A Matter of Mentors"	Vincent McEveety	Story by : Pat Green & Chris Manheim & E. F. Wallengren; Teleplay by : Pat Green & Chris Manheim	March 26, 1980
Joanie gets an important assignment at work but Jeffrey believes that the boss will be expecting a favor in return; Nicholas has a problem with a bully that he can't hit back; Tommy is appointed the Bradford household accountant believing he can do the job better than his father.
88	25	"Roll Over Bradford"	Stan Lathan	Story by : Gary Adelson & Gil Grant & William Daley; Teleplay by : Gary Adelson & Gil Grant	April 2, 1980
Tom hits the roof when Tommy gets more interested in a music career than college, so Tommy and Ernie drive to Los Angeles for an audition; Aunt Vivian returns, with a blah fiancé in tow. Janis Paige returns as Auntie V.
89	26	"A Little Triangle"	Vincent McEveety	Story by : Nick Thiel & David Braff & Gail Honigberg; Teleplay by : Nick Thiel & David Braff	April 9, 1980
Nancy dates a widower with a young daughter...and feels a greater connection with her; Tommy tries to get Ernie a prom date; Nicholas starts a dog-grooming business.
90	27	"Grad Night"	Irving J. Moore	Chris Manheim & Pat Green	April 30, 1980
The Bradford clan vacates the house for Tommy, Ernie and their girlfriends on Graduation Night. Eric Stoltz guest stars.

=== Season 5 (1980–81) ===
No. overall	No. in season	Title	Directed by	Written by	Original release date	Prod. code
91	1	"And Baby Makes Nine"	Harry Harris	Hindi Brooks	October 29, 1980	189041
92	2	"And Baby Makes Nine"	Harry Harris	Hindi Brooks	October 29, 1980	189041
A very pregnant Susan is in an automobile accident; Elizabeth moves in with her boyfriend behind Tom's back; Merle pitches for the New York Mets; Tom unwittingly becomes Scout Master of Nicholas' troop. Notes: This was a special 90-minute episode; syndicated versions of this episode split it into two hour-long parts, cutting some scenes out. This season started later than normal due to the actors' strike of 1980.
93	3	"Jeremy"	Jack Bender	Gil Grant	November 5, 1980	189045
There's trouble brewing when the newest member of the Bradford household -- Abby's troubled nephew Jeremy -- shares a smoke with Nicholas; Jeremy's father tries to explain his absence; Joanie's on-air news anchor debut does not go as planned. Notes: Although Ralph Macchio very briefly appears, without any lines, at the end of part two of "And Baby Makes Nine", this is the first proper appearance of the character Jeremy in the show. Bubba Smith also appears in the episode.
94	4	"Welcome to Memorial, Dr. Bradford"	Bernard McEveety	Channing Gibson	November 12, 1980	189043
Abby gets a job as a school guidance counselor at one of the most violent schools in the city; the Bradfords become Tom's chauffeur after he fails his driver's exam; Nicholas is dared to steal from a store.
95	5	"Generations"	Harry Harris	Story by : Michael Marks and J. Miyoko Hensley & Steven Hensley; Teleplay by : Karen Hall & Michael Marks and J. Miyoko Hensley & Steven Hensley	November 19, 1980	189046
While baby Sandra Sue comes home from the hospital, Abby finds herself the target of criticism from the father of Tom's late wife Joan; Tommy finds a job...at a strip club.
96	6	"Holly"	Jack Bender	Story by : Bob Shayne; Teleplay by : Bob Shayne and Gary Adelson & Gil Grant	November 26, 1980	189050
Tommy falls for a young mother who's a lyricist for their band; the Bradford garage is transformed into a small nursery for Susan and her baby.
97	7	"The Maltese Airline Bag"	Harry Harris	Lee Sheldon	December 10, 1980	189049
Nicholas and his friend Marvin come into possession of an airline bag a mysterious woman gave them to deliver to an equally mysterious man who drove off before they could finish their mission; Tom senses a conspiracy against him at the office.
98	8	"Strike"	Seth Pinsker	Bruce Shelly	December 17, 1980	189062
A newspaper strike -- which Tom finds himself sympathizing with both sides -- finds finances tight at the Bradfords, until Nicholas suggests bartering as a way to survive.
99	9	"Bradfordgate"	Harry Harris	Gil Grant	January 7, 1981	189060
Tom's nomination to the Board of Education makes him compromise his beliefs...and a target of a smear campaign; Joanie goes undercover as a TV reporter; Nicholas tries to change his "cute" image.
100	10	"The Darlene Dilemma"	Rowe Wallerstein	Jeff Wilhelm	January 14, 1981	189058
A girl student Abby is counseling at her school comes between Jeremy and Tommy; Nancy lands a modeling job for a heating and cooling company with shady business practices; Nicholas turns to cooking to impress a girl.
101	11	"Second Thoughts"	Harry Harris	Karen Hall	January 21, 1981	189056
Nancy's modeling career takes off, but the price of her new fame has a downside; Joanie takes a leave of absence from work to reassess her career; Nicholas has a concert ticket which Tommy is eager to get his hands on.
102	12	"David's Rib"	Irving J. Moore	Story by : Pat Green & Bob Shayne; Teleplay by : Bruce Shelly	January 28, 1981	189061
When Joanie gets David work renovating an opera house, it generates a court battle: David vs. Janet; Nicholas receives a horse as a gift, which Abby tries to help him keep; Merle comes home from New York City, but finds new mom Susan is more than a little too tired to celebrate.
103	13	"Vows"	Irving J. Moore	Gil Grant & Gary Adelson	February 18, 1981	189063
It's a matter of vows, alright: Tom and Abby want to renew theirs for their third anniversary, but David and Janet try to hide the fact their marriage may have come to an end; Jeremy's new girlfriend comes between him and his schoolmates.
104	14	"The Way We Were"	Vincent McEveety	Sandra Kay Siegel	March 4, 1981	189065
Tommy tries to get back with Jill when she starts liking Ernie; David's depressed over his new bachelor apartment complex; Nicholas & Jeremy deliver newspapers for the Sacramento Tribune, Tom's work rival.
105	15	"If the Glass Slipper Fits"	Stan Lathan	Story by : Daryl Busby & Gerry Kroll and Karen Hall; Teleplay by : Karen Hall	March 11, 1981	189066
Nancy is asked to pose topless for an ad; Elizabeth wants to date a guy who only seems to want friendship; Nicholas becomes David's apartment-hunting guide.
106	16	"The Best Little Telethon in Sacramento"	Irving J. Moore	Bruce Shelly	March 28, 1981	189072
Joanie organizes a telethon for Channel 8; Tommy thinks twice about Jeremy managing his band; David's roommate spawns an overbearing girlfriend who works herself into another roommate. The episode features song & dance performances by Willie Aames, Connie Needham, Betty Buckley, Grant Goodeve, Dianne Kay & Adam Rich.
107	17	"Yet Another Seven Days in February?"	Rowe Wallerstein	Gary Adelson & Gil Grant	April 4, 1981	189069
The Bradford guys are the ones finding love this winter break: Tommy dates the daughter of a radio-station owner to get exposure for his band; David falls victim to the girl's mother's sexual aggressiveness; Jeremy struggles to keep up with the girl's athletic cousin. Heather Locklear guest stars.
108	18	"The Idolbreaker: Part 1"	Jack Bender	Gary Adelson & Karen Hall	April 11, 1981	189073
Tommy's band gets the biggest gig of its career when the group's agent signs them for a national tour with a top star, but it gets derailed when his ex-girlfriend has some breaking news of her own; the girls try to rehabilitate a homeless man; Nicholas defends a girl's honor against a bully.
109	19	"The Idolbreaker: Part 2"	Jack Bender	Gary Adelson & Karen Hall	April 18, 1981	189074
Tommy moves into Ellen's apartment and makes plans for their future wedding; a new sexy female reporter stirs jealousy in Joanie; Jeremy is frustrated when the Bradfords are unaware of his upcoming 16th birthday. Note: Final regular series appearance of Willie Aames as Tommy Bradford.
110	20	"Starting Over"	Harry Harris	Story by : Hollace White & Stephanie Garman and Philip Taylor & Bruce Kalish; Teleplay by : Hollace White & Stephanie Garman	May 9, 1981	189070
David and Janet begin to see each other again, but is reconciliation in the cards? Jeremy digs up a human skull in the front yard; Nicholas tries to use Elizabeth's relationship with his basketball coach as a means to an end.
111	21	"Goals"	Jack Bender	Story by : Bruce Shelly; Teleplay by : Stephanie Garman & Hollace White	May 16, 1981	189071
When he suffers a shoulder injury, Merle's playing career is in jeopardy; Mary's the target of an overzealous lovesick patient; Jeremy finds a job selling questionable products of an experimental nature.
112	22	"Father Knows Best?"	Gary Adelson	Gil Grant	May 23, 1981	189064
Filming date: March 21–27, 1981; Jeremy's father shows up to assert his parental rights; David's old high school classmates arrive for their reunion. Note: This is the second appearance of Jeremy's father in the season, but he is played by a different actor (John Considine in the episode, "Jeremy" and George DiCenzo in this episode).

== Post-series movies ==
No.	Title	Directed by	Written by	Original release date
M1	Eight Is Enough: A Family Reunion	Harry Harris	Gwen Bagni-Dubov	October 18, 1987
Tommy, David, Mary and the other Bradford siblings come home for Tom's 50th birthday. Note: Mary Frann replaced series regular Betty Buckley in the role of Abby Bradford.
M2	An Eight Is Enough Wedding	Stan Lathan	Greg Strangis	October 15, 1989
The Bradfords bring their family home for David's wedding, which is open to discussion. Note: Sandy Faison replaced series regular Betty Buckley and replacement Mary Frann in the role of Abby Bradford.

== Syndication ==
Reruns of all 112 episodes of Eight Is Enough have aired sporadically since the show's syndication debut in September 1982. The show aired on FX from 1994 to 1997, on PAX in 1998, and as part of a marathon celebrating the 50th anniversary of Warner Bros. Television on TV Land in 2005. Eight Is Enough also aired on the Chicago-based MeTV and MeToo, a sister station of MeTV, from 2008 to 2010 before MeTV spread to other markets around the U.S.

During its network run, the show was distributed by Worldvision Enterprises (also internationally in rebroadcasts), and later by Lorimar-Telepictures. All syndication rights are now held by Lorimar's successor, Warner Bros. Television.

From 2006 until 2009, the series was formerly available for streaming online on AOL's In2TV service. From 2023 until 2026, the series was available for streaming online on Tubi via the WBTV All Together Now FAST channel. From 2024 until 2026, the complete series was also available on The Roku Channel.

The series has also been available for purchase online on Amazon Prime Video and Apple TV.

=== International ===
In Italy, RAI public networks aired the first season of Eight Is Enough under the title Otto Bastano in 1978, the literal Italian translation of the original title. The remaining seasons were aired in the 1980s on Retequattro, a commercial network from Fininvest (now Mediaset), under the title La Famiglia Bradford. The Italian version excludes the laugh track.

The French version, Huit, ça suffit!, which excludes the laugh track, was successful in the 1980s in France and Quebec, and with the francophone Canadian audience in general.

In Spain during the same period, Con Ocho Basta (Spanish for "Eight Is Enough") ran on Televisión Española's Friday night line-up.

In the Philippines, Eight Is Enough aired on GMA Radio-Television Arts from 1978 to 1981.

== Home media ==
On April 17, 2012, Warner Home Video released the complete first season of Eight Is Enough on DVD in Region 1. The release includes the pilot episode (featuring Mark Hamill in the role of eldest son David) and a cast reunion special which occurred on the Today show in 2012 (sans Richardson, Rich and the late O'Grady). Several of the episodes have the wrong end credits, and the Lorimar Productions logo has also been edited out of the end credits.

On November 13, 2012, Warner Bros. released season 2, parts one and two on DVD-R via their Warner Archive Collection. These are Manufacture-on-Demand (MOD) releases and are available through Warner's online store and Amazon.com. Season 3, Parts One and Two were released on April 30, 2013.

Season 4, parts one and two were released on August 13, 2013. The fifth and final season was released on March 11, 2014.

DVD name	Episodes	Release date
The Complete First Season	9	April 17, 2012; July 16, 2019 (re-release)
The Complete Second Season, Part 1	14	November 13, 2012
The Complete Second Season, Part 2	12	November 13, 2012
The Complete Third Season, Part 1	14	April 30, 2013
The Complete Third Season, Part 2	14	April 30, 2013
The Complete Fourth Season, Part 1	14	August 13, 2013
The Complete Fourth Season, Part 2	13	August 13, 2013
The Complete Fifth Season	22	March 11, 2014

== See also ==
- The Brady Bunch (1969)
- Just the Ten of Us (1988)
