= Kimberly Beck =

American actress and model

- Other name: Kimberly Beck-Hilton
- Occupations: Actress; model; singer
- Years active: 1958–2022
- Known for: Friday the 13th: The Final Chapter; The Big Blue; Peyton Place; Massacre at Central High; Roller Boogie; Rich Man, Poor Man Book II
- Spouse: Jason Clark (m. 1988)
- Children: 2
- Relatives: Cindy Robbins (mother)

Kimberly Beck is a former American actress, model and singer. She is best known for her role as Trish Jarvis in Joseph Zito's Friday the 13th: The Final Chapter (1984). Her other film roles include Alfred Hitchcock's Marnie (1964), Luc Besson's The Big Blue (1988), George T. Miller's Frozen Assets (1992), and Roland Emmerich's Independence Day (1996).

== Life and career ==
Kimberly Beck was born to the actress Cindy Robbins. As a child, she appeared in Alfred Hitchcock's Marnie and television commercials for such products as Mattel's Barbie and Chatty dolls. She had a very brief appearance on The Munsters as a transformed Eddie Munster after Eddie (Butch Patrick) drank the rest of Grandpa (Al Lewis)'s Texas Playgirl Potion in season 1, episode 33 "Lily Munster, Girl Model".

In 1968, Beck and her stepfather Tommy Leonetti, then working in Australia, recorded the single "Let's Take a Walk", released under the name of "Tommy Leonetti and his daughter Kim". It charted at #4 on the Melbourne charts.

Beck starred in such movies as Massacre at Central High, Roller Boogie, and Friday the 13th: The Final Chapter. Among her notable television credits are General Hospital, Capitol (billed as Kimberly Beck-Hilton), Fantasy Island, Buck Rogers in the 25th Century (as Alison Michaels, one side of a Jekyll-and-Hyde character, whose counterpart Sabrina was played by Trisha Noble), Westwind, The Brady Bunch, Dynasty, Lucas Tanner and Peyton Place (as the character Kim Schuster). Beck starred on the pilot episode of Eight Is Enough as Nancy Bradford, the role that, in the series, went to Dianne Kay. She also had the role of Diane Porter in Rich Man, Poor Man Book II with Peter Strauss and appeared in a host of other well-received television miniseries productions.

In 1988, Beck married producer Jason Clark and they had two sons. She appeared in the documentary Crystal Lake Memories: The Complete History of Friday the 13th in 2013 and reprised her role as Trish Jarvis from the Friday the 13th franchise in a voiceover role for the fan film short Victim No More in 2022.

== Filmography ==
=== Film ===
| Year | Title | Role | Notes |
|---|---|---|---|
| 1958 | Torpedo Run | Dede Doyle | Uncredited |
| 1959 | The FBI Story | Jennie Hardesty (age 2) | Uncredited |
| 1963 | The Courtship of Eddie's Father | Child Party Guest | Uncredited |
| 1964 | Marnie | Jessica "Jessie" Cotton | Uncredited |
| 1968 | Yours, Mine and Ours | Janette North | |
| 1976 | Massacre at Central High | Teresa | |
| 1979 | Roller Boogie | Lana | |
| 1984 | Friday the 13th: The Final Chapter | Trish Jarvis | |
| 1987 | Maid to Order | Kim | |
| 1988 | The Big Blue | Sally | |
| 1988 | Nightmare at Noon | Cheri Griffiths | Alternate title: Death Street USA |
| 1988 | Messenger of Death | Piety Beecham | |
| 1988 | Private War | Kim | |
| 1989 | Playroom | Secretary | |
| 1990 | False Identity | Cindy Roger | |
| 1991 | Adventures in Dinosaur City | Chanteuse | |
| 1992 | Frozen Assets | Voice Actress | Voice role |
| 1994 | Killing Zoe | Woman Customer | |
| 1996 | Independence Day | Housewife | |
| 1999 | The Secret Life of Girls | Mrs. Buchinsky | |
| 2009 | Heidi 4 Paws | Clara Sesehound | Voice role |
| 2022 | Victim No More | Trish Jarvis-Mahoney | Voice role |

=== Television ===
| Year | Title | Role | Notes |
|---|---|---|---|
| 1964 | Kraft Suspense Theatre | Child #2 | 1 episode |
| 1965 | The Munsters | Girl Eddie Munster | 1 episode |
| 1965–1966 | Peyton Place | Kim Schuster | 34 episodes |
| 1966 | The Virginian | Laura Tedler | 1 episode |
| 1966 | I Dream of Jeannie | Gina | 1 episode |
| 1969 | Land of the Giants | Giant Girl | 1 episode |
| 1969 | My Three Sons | Susan Crawford | 1 episode |
| 1970 | Me and Benjie | | TV pilot |
| 1971 | Bonanza | Girl | 1 episode |
| 1971–1973 | The Brady Bunch | Laura | 2 episodes |
| 1974–1975 | Lucas Tanner | Terry Klitsner | 21 episodes |
| 1975 | Adam-12 | Jo Anne Thompson | 1 episode |
| 1975 | General Hospital | Samantha Livingston | 1 episode |
| 1975 | Mobile One | Marlene | 1 episode |
| 1975–1976 | Westwind | Robin Andrews | 13 episodes |
| 1976–1977 | Rich Man, Poor Man Book II | Diane Porter | 15 episodes |
| 1977 | Eight Is Enough | Nancy Bradford | TV pilot |
| 1977 | The Hardy Boys/Nancy Drew Mysteries | Sue | 1 episode |
| 1977 | Murder in Peyton Place | Bonnie Buehler | Television film |
| 1978 | Husbands, Wives & Lovers | Amanda | 1 episode |
| 1978 | Zuma Beach | Cathy | Television film |
| 1979 | B. J. and the Bear | Cindy Smith | 1 episode |
| 1979 | Fantasy Island | Cindy | 1 episode |
| 1979 | Starting Fresh | Stephanie Harvey | TV pilot |
| 1979 | Buck Rogers in the 25th Century | Alison Michaels | 1 episode |
| 1980 | The Misadventures of Sheriff Lobo | Vicky Bowers | 1 episode |
| 1980 | Scalpels | Nurse Connie Primble | TV pilot |
| 1980 | Freebie and the Bean | | 1 episode |
| 1981 | Mr. Merlin | Susan | 1 episode |
| 1982 | Matt Houston | Laurie Wildcat | 1 episode |
| 1982–1983 | Capitol | Julie Clegg | 260 episodes |
| 1983 | Webster | Molly | 1 episode |
| 1984 | T. J. Hooker | Linda Stevens | 1 episode |
| 1985 | Hunter | Marlene | 1 episode |
| 1985 | Hollywood Beat | Prostitute | 1 episode |
| 1985 | Deadly Intentions | Sally Raynor | Television film |
| 1986 | Crazy Like a Fox | Stella Moran | 1 episode |
| 1986 | The New Mike Hammer | Lisa Burnett | 1 episode |
| 1986–1987 | Dynasty | Claire Prentice | 4 episodes |
| 1987 | L.A. Law | Nancy Tritchler | 1 episode |
| 1987 | The Law & Harry McGraw | Phoebe Cabot | 1 episode |
| 1991 | Sons and Daughters | Blonde Girl | 1 episode |
| 1991 | The 100 Lives of Black Jack Savage | Connie | 1 episode |
| 1991 | FBI: The Untold Stories | Suzie Emory | 1 episode |
| 1991 | The Commish | Michelle Carver | 1 episode |
| 1992 | In the Deep Woods | Margot | Television film |
| 1993 | Sex, Shock and Censorship in the '90s | Marsha Miller | 1 episode |
| 1994 | Ultraman: The Ultimate Hero | Patty Miller | 1 episode |
