= Arlene Stadd =

American dramatist

- Born: January 19, 1931; Philadelphia, Pennsylvania, U.S.
- Died: February 5, 2001 (aged 70); Los Angeles, California, U.S.
- Writing career
- Language: English
- Genres: Television, theatre

Arlene Stadd was an American television writer and playwright.

Stadd married writer Leonard Stadd in 1950. After graduating from Carnegie Institute of Technology in 1951, Stadd and her husband co-wrote numerous scripts for television series such as Room 222, Hawaii Five-0, Love, American Style. Stadd also wrote episodes of Hotel and was a staff writer on The Doctors and General Hospital. Stadd and Stadd divorced in 1976.

Stadd is also known for her historical Eleanor Roosevelt themed play Eleanor.

Stadd died on February 5, 2001, at age 70 of a stroke at Cedars-Sinai Medical Center.
