= Misha Suslov =

Russian cinematographer (1939–2024)

Mikhail Suslov
- Михаил Суслов
- Suslov in 2012
- Born: Mikhail Petrovich Suslov; 23 March 1939; Russian SFSR, USSR
- Died: 5 March 2024 (aged 84)
- Education: VGIK
- Occupation: Cinematographer
- Years active: 1963–2024

Mikhail Petrovich Suslov (Russian: Михаил Петрович Суслов; 23 March 1939 – 5 March 2024), also known as Misha Suslov (Russian: Миша Суслов), was a Russian cinematographer.

== Life and career ==
Suslov was born in the USSR. In 1962 he graduated from the camera department of VGIK (workshop of Leonid Kosmatov). For three years he worked on Moscow television, where the creative association "Ekran" was being created. He filmed pop performances by Joseph Kobzon, Maya Kristalinskaya, and Muslim Magomayev. He mastered the production of short feature films and television programs.

Then he moved to the Mosfilm studio. He participated in the creation of several films, among which the historical-revolutionary film The Sixth of July, directed by Yuli Karasik, which stands out for its strict ascetic style.

Moving to the United States in 1976, in Hollywood, he worked mainly in the genres of action and crime drama, including Black Moon Rising and Champion.

Suslov worked with director John Hancock for Steal the Sky, Prancer, A Piece of Eden, Suspended Animation, The Looking Glass, and The Girls of Summer. Suslov's camerawork in the drama film Prancer added sincerity to the story of a girl finding a reindeer she believes is Santa's.

From the late 1990s, he worked regularly in Russia, including fruitfully collaborating with director Sergei Ursuliak, filming Long Farewell, Poirot's Failure, Liquidation, Isaev, Life and Fate, and And Quiet Flows the Don.

Suslov died on 5 March 2024, at the age of 84.

== Filmography ==
Year	Title	Type	Role
1963	Short Stories	TV movie	Cinematographer
1967	Arena	Film	Cinematographer
1968	The Sixth of July	Film	Cinematographer
1972	The Seagull	Film	Cinematographer
1972	Musician's Sister	Film	Cinematographer
1973	A Man at His Place	Film	Cinematographer
1973	No Place to Hide	Film	Cinematographer: Second unit
1977	The Washington Affair	Film	Cinematographer
1980	Smokey and the Judge	Film	Cinematographer
1980	Below the Belt	Film	Additional photographer
1982	Truckin' Buddy McCoy	Film	Cinematographer
1983	Strangers Kiss	Film	Cinematographer
1984	On the Line	Film	Additional cinematographer
1984	Very Close Quarters	Film	Cinematographer
1984	Shattered Vows	TV movie	Cinematographer
1985	American Playhouse	TV series	Cinematographer
1986	Black Moon Rising	Film	Director of photography
1986	3:15 the Moment of Truth	Film	Cinematographer
1986	Nobody's Fool	Film	Cinematographer
1987	The Verne Miller Story	Film	Cinematographer
1987	The Great O'Grady	Short	Cinematographer
1988	Hothouse	TV series	Cinematographer
1988	Steal the Sky	TV movie	Cinematographer
1989	Prancer	Film	Director of photography
1989	Peacemaker	Short	Cinematographer
1990	The Sleeping Car	Film	Director of photography: Second unit
1990	Against the Law	TV series	Cinematographer
1991	The Runestone	Film	Director of photography
1991	Talkin' Dirty After Dark	Film	Cinematographer
1994	Pentathlon	Film	Cinematographer
1995	Sacred Cargo	Film	Cinematographer
1996	Public Enemies	Film	Cinematographer
1998	Composition for Victory Day	Film	Cinematographer
2000	A Piece of Eden	Film	Cinematographer
2001	Suspended Animation	Film	Cinematographer
2002	Poirot's Failure	TV series	Cinematographer
2004	Long Farewell	Film	Cinematographer
2004	Tairov's Death	Film	Cinematographer
2007	Liquidation	TV mini series	Director of photography
2007	Isaev	TV mini series	Cinematographer
2009	Life and Fate	Film	Director of photography
2015	The Looking Glass	Film	Cinematographer
2015	And Quiet Flows the Don	TV mini series	Cinematographer
2018	Blackout	TV mini series	Cinematographer
2019	Odessa Streamer	TV movie	Director of photography
2020	The Girls of Summer	Film	Cinematographer

== Awards ==
- 2005 – Moskvin Prize at the film festival "Literature and Cinema" in Gatchina for the film Long Farewell
- 2008 – TEFI Award in the nomination the cinematographer of a television feature film/series for Liquidation
- 2013 – Professional award of the Association of Film and Television Producers in the field of television cinema in the nomination For the best camera work (TV series Life and Fate)
- 2015 – Professional award of the Association of Film and Television Producers in the field of television cinema in the nomination For the best camera work (TV series Quiet Don)
