= Orville Stoeber =

American singer-songwriter

Orville Stoeber (born June 20, 1947) is an American singer/songwriter, actor and artist.

He is primarily known for his 1971 album Songs on UNI records (MCA), his work as score composer for the horror film Let's Scare Jessica to Death (1971), and his collaboration with author Margaret Atwood on Hymns of the God's Gardeners (2009), utilizing lyrics from The Year of the Flood (2009), the second book of her science fiction trilogy MaddAddam.

== Music and acting career ==
After leaving the University of Nebraska for New York in the late 1960s, Stoeber, an Army brat, found work in the off-Broadway theater scene. One of his first jobs was as a singer in Robert Joffrey's 1967 multimedia ballet, Astarte. He also wrote music for A.R. Gurney Jr.'s Tonight! In Living Color! (1969) and Andy Warhol collaborator Ronald Tavel's Obie award winning play Boy on the Straight-Back Chair (1969), staged at the American Place Theatre. In 1970, Stoeber wrote music for John D. Hancock's short film Sticky My Fingers, Fleet My Feet, adapted by John Lahr from a New Yorker story, which was nominated for an Oscar. The following year, Stoeber released his debut album, Songs, and wrote the music for Hancock's horror film Let's Scare Jessica to Death. Stoeber continued to work with director Hancock as a composer and actor in several of his films, including Bang the Drum Slowly (1973), starring Robert De Niro, and Weeds (1987), starring Nick Nolte.

In 1997, he acted in the thriller film Switchback, starring Dennis Quaid and Danny Glover, and the Nathan Lane comedy Mouse Hunt. That same year, following a long hiatus, Stoeber began recording music again, after meeting literary agent Phoebe Larmore, who went on to produce his self-recorded album Whispering Roots in 2000. Subsequent albums My Fatal Flaw and Necessary Imagination were produced with record producer Ted Perlman.

In 2009, author Margaret Atwood commissioned Stoeber to compose music for the lyrics from her novel The Year of the Flood, released that year on a CD titled Hymns of the God's Gardeners, simultaneous with the publication of the best-selling novel. Stoeber accompanied Atwood and performed selected hymns in an international musical presentation of the novel tour across the US, UK and Wales, as well as in Tokyo and Toronto. In the summer of 2014, HBO optioned Atwood's MaddAddam trilogy, for a series to be directed by Darren Aronofsky.

Stoeber continues to record music and act, serving in both capacities for Hancock's 2014 film, Swan Song, and he released a CD titled In the Cloud of Unknowing in the fall of that year. In the 2000s, Stoeber, also a multimedia artist and art teacher in Venice, CA, had his art in several galleries, including Altered Space and Koplin Del Rio.

== Discography ==
- 1971: Songs
- 2005: My Fatal Flaw
- 2006: Whispering Roots
- 2009: Hymns of the God's Gardeners
- 2010: Necessary Imagination
- 2012: 8
- 2015: The Cloud of Unknowing

== Filmography ==
=== Soundtracks ===
- Sticky My Fingers, Fleet My Feet (1970) - Oscar nominated short

Let's Scare Jessica to Death (1971)

- Bang the Drum Slowly (1973)
- A Piece of the Action (1977)
- Weeds (1987)
- America Undercover - Episode: "Convicts on the Street: One Year on Parole" (1990)
- Freddy's Nightmares (1988)
- Suspended Animation (2001)
- The Looking Glass (2015)
