= Troshin =

Troshin is a Russian surname. Notable people with the surname include:

- Oleg Troshin (born 1964), Soviet racewalker
- Valeriy Troshin (born 1970), Soviet and Russian actor
- Vladimir Troshin (1926–2008), Soviet actor and singer
- Vyacheslav Troshin (born 22 May 1959), Russian diver
