= Barton Heyman =

American actor (1937–1996)

- Born: January 24, 1937; Washington, D.C., U.S.
- Died: May 15, 1996 (aged 59); New York City, U.S.
- Education: University of California, Los Angeles
- Occupation: Actor
- Years active: 1964–1996

Barton Heyman (January 24, 1937 – May 15, 1996) was an American actor. Heyman was a graduate of the University of California, Los Angeles where he studied theater arts. As an actor in films, his obituary in the Los Angeles Times asserts that he came to public attention for his role in the 1995 movie Dead Man Walking. Heyman was also a stage actor, appearing in a number of New York Shakespeare Festival productions.

== Filmography ==
Year	Title	Role	Notes
1963	The Twilight Zone	Lieutenant Blane	Season 5 Episode 9: "Probe 7, Over and Out"
1964	Deadline for Murder		
1964	Shock Treatment	1st Young Interne	Uncredited
1971	Valdez Is Coming	El Segundo	
1971	Let's Scare Jessica to Death	Duncan	
1971	Is There Sex After Death?	Brad Barlow	
1972	The Trial of the Catonsville Nine	John Hogan	
1973	Bang the Drum Slowly	Red	
1973	The Exorcist	Dr. Klein	
1973	Road Movie		
1974	The Super Cops	Police Lt. Stratton	
1975	The Happy Hooker	Dirty Harry	
1976	Baby Blue Marine	Barber	
1979	California Dreaming	Jerry	
1979	A Life of Sin		
1980	Night of the Juggler	Preacher	
1980	Cruising	Dr. Rifkin	
1985	Static	Sherriff William Orling	
1986	Billy Galvin	Kennedy	
1987	The Secret of My Success	Arnold Forbush	
1987	Weeds	Godot Player	
1988	Masquerade	Tommy McGill	
1988	The Wizard of Loneliness	Hank Kahler	
1988	Bum Rap	Dad	
1990	Quick Change	Airport Security Chief	
1990	Awakenings	Bert	
1990	The Bonfire of the Vanities	Det. Martin	
1991	Billy Bathgate	Banker	
1992	Roadside Prophets	Sheriff Quentin Durango	
1992	Raising Cain	Mack	
1993	Robot in the Family	Mr. Marshall	
1995	The Basketball Diaries	Confessional Priest	
1995	Jeffrey	Elderly Man	
1995	Dead Man Walking	Captain Beliveau	
1996	Rescuing Desire	Willard	(final film role)
