= Long Farewell =

- Russian: Долгое прощание
- Directed by: Sergei Ursuliak
- Written by: Elga Lyndina; Yuri Trifonov; Sergey Ursulyak
- Produced by: Armen Adilkhanyan; Sergey Chliyants; Olga Kostromitina; Yevgeny Ulyushkin
- Starring: Polina Agureeva; Andrei Schchennikov; Boris Kamorzin; Tatyana Lebedkova; Pyotr Merkuryev
- Cinematography: Misha Suslov
- Production company: Ministry of Culture (Russia)
- Release date: 2004
- Running time: 106 minutes
- Country: Russia
- Language: Russian

Long Farewell (Russian: Долгое прощание, romanized: Dolgoe proshchanie) is a 2004 Russian drama film directed by Sergei Ursuliak based on the story of the same name by Yuri Trifonov.

== Plot ==
The film tells about a love triangle. Actress Lyalya loves her husband, an unsuccessful writer, and she is loved by an adult successful playwright who helped her solve all problems.

== Cast ==
- Polina Agureeva as Lyalya Telepniova
  - Valentina Sharykina as Lyalya in old
- Andrei Schchennikov as Grigory Rebrov
  - Yevgeny Kindinov as Grigory in old
- Boris Kamorzin as Nikolai Smolyanov, playwright
- Tatyana Lebedkova as Irina Ignatievna
- Pyotr Merkuryev as Boris Mironovich Marevin
- Konstantin Zheldin as Pyotr Alexandrovich, Lyalya's father
- Alexander Klyukvin as Smurny
- Genrietta Yegorova as Tamara Ignatievna
- Lyudmila Arinina as episode
- Anna Antonenko-Lukonina as Anna Vasilievna
- Galina Konovalova as theater actress
- Valeriy Troshin as Kotov
- Fyodor Dobronravov as Fyodor Vasilyevich
- Valery Zhakov as episode
- Evgeniya Dmitrieva as Allochka
