= Yelena Kondulainen =

Soviet singer and actor (born 1958)

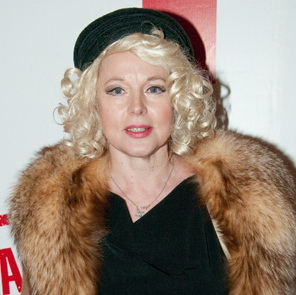
- Kondulainen in 2011
- Born: Finnish: Lembi Kontulainen, 9 April 1958 (age 68), Toksovo, Leningrad Oblast, RSFSR, USSR.
- Occupations: Actress, pop singer.
- Years active: 1979–present.
- Awards: (2002).
- Yelena Kondulainen's voice Kondulainen's interview on the Echo of Moscow program, 23 June 2009

Yelena Ivanovna Kondulainen (Russian: Елена Ивановна Кондулайнен; born 9 April 1958 as Lembi Kontulainen) is a Russian Ingrian actress, Honored Artist of the Russian Federation (2002), and pop singer.

== Life and career ==
Kondulainen comes from a family of Ingrian Finns. In 1983, she graduated from the Saint Petersburg State Theatre Arts Academy (course of Georgy Tovstonogov). She has starred in more than 40 movies.

When Kondulainen began to receive fame with the daring movie roles she played in the late 1980s, her looks were often compared – for instance – to those of Marilyn Monroe and Marlene Dietrich. Soon, she began to be referred to as the first-ever sex symbol of the Soviet Union (1922–1991), and following her performance in the 1990 movie 100 Days Before the Command also the first sex symbol in the Russian Federation (a.k.a. Russia; founded in 1991).

In 1993, Kondulainen entered politics, but only for a brief time, to help promote a movement and political party in Russia known as Free Love. Kondulainen composes music for her own songs and writes lyrics for them. She has also continuously been active in various theater arts productions. Her recent acting roles have included e.g. one in which she plays Catherine the Great (a.k.a. Catherine II).
