= Dorothy Tristan =

American actress and screenwriter (1934–2023)

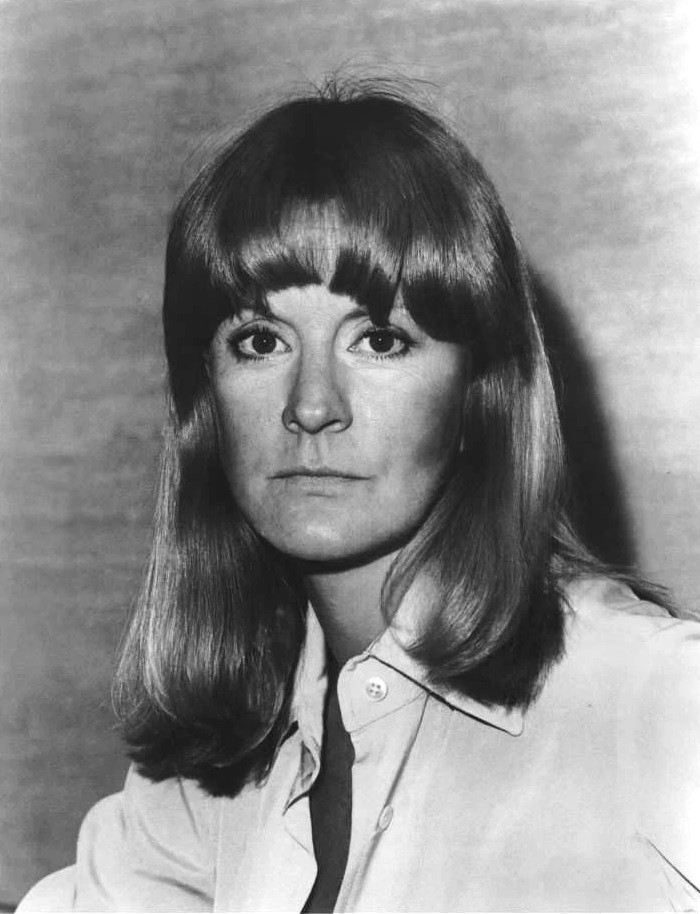
- Tristan in 1977
- Born: May 9, 1934; New York City, U.S.
- Died: January 7, 2023 (aged 88); La Porte, Indiana, U.S.
- Occupations: Actress; Screenwriter
- Notable work: Klute; Scarecrow
- Spouses: Aram Avakian (m. 1957; div. 1972) John D. Hancock (m. 1975)
- Children: 2

Dorothy Tristan (May 9, 1934 – January 7, 2023) was an American actress and screenwriter. She was best known for her roles in the films Klute, Down and Out in Beverly Hills, and Scarecrow. She co-wrote the films Steal the Sky and Weeds. She also wrote the films Suspended Animation, which is based on her novel, and A Piece of Eden. Tristan started her career as a model and was on the magazine covers of Vogue and Life. In 1957, she married her first husband, Aram Avakian. They divorced in 1972. A couple of years before that, she made her film debut in End of the Road, which was made by Avakian. In 1975, she married John D. Hancock and they would collaborate on films like Weeds.

On January 7, 2023, she died in La Porte, Indiana, of complications from Alzheimer's disease. She was 88.

== Filmography ==
=== Film ===
Year	Title	Role	Notes
1970	End of the Road	Rennie Morgan	
1971	Klute	Arlyn Page	
1973	Scarecrow	Coley	
1974	Man on a Swing	Janet Tucker	
1976	Swashbuckler	Alice	
1977	Rollercoaster	Helen	
1979	California Dreaming	Fay	
1986	Down and Out in Beverly Hills	Dorothy	
1987	Weeds	—N/a	Screenwriter
2000	A Piece of Eden	—N/a	Screenwriter
2001	Suspended Animation	—N/a	Screenwriter
2015	The Looking Glass	Karen	Also screenwriter
2020	The Girls of Summer	Woman on the Porch	

=== Television ===
Year	Title	Role	Notes
1973	Isn't It Shocking?	Doc Lovell	TV film
1974	Gunsmoke	Lyla Ross	2 episodes
1974	Kojak	Ellen	Episode: "The Best Judge Money Can Buy"
1975	Fear on Trial	Laura Faulk	TV film
1975	The Rookies	Maxine	Episode: "Ladies Day"
1976	Griffin and Phoenix	Jean Griffin	TV film
1977	The Incredible Hulk	Mrs. Griffith	Episode: "Death in the Family"
1979	The Waltons	Callie May Jordan	Episode: "The Torch"
1988	Steal the Sky	—N/a	TV film; screenwriter
