= Liquidation (miniseries) =

Russian television series

- DVD cover
- Directed by: Sergei Ursuliak
- Starring: Vladimir Mashkov, Mikhail Porechenkov, Sergei Makovetsky, Vladimir Menshov, Konstantin Lavronenko, Svetlana Kryuchkova, Aleksandr Semchev, Fedor Dobronravov, Kseniya Rappoport, Lika Nifontova, Polina Agureeva.
- Country of origin: Russia
- Original language: Russian

Production
- Cinematography: Misha Suslov
- Running time: 644 minutes

Original release
- Release: 2007

Liquidation (2007) (Russian: Ликвидация, Likvidatsiya) is a highly popular Russian television series. The year is 1946. World War II is over, but the post-war city of Odessa is ruled by serial killer prison-escapees and former Nazi collaborators.

Fallen into disfavor, Soviet general Marshal Zhukov is sent to Odessa by Soviet leader Joseph Stalin to handle the situation. Together with the head of the local criminal investigation unit, David Gottsman, Marshal Zhoukov begins a special operation post-war Odessa crime cleanup.

== Inspiration ==
The film parallels the famous 1979 Soviet film The Meeting Place Cannot Be Changed with a notable ethical shift. In the "Meeting Place", chief of criminal investigations Gleb Zheglov (played by Vladimir Vysotskiy) had a modus operandi "The thief must go to prison, no matter how I put him there" (and uses planted evidence to do so).

In Liquidation, chief of criminal investigations David Gottsman's (played by Vladimir Mashkov) motto has changed to "The thief must go to prison, but lawfully so".

The stars of the film include famous Russian actors such as Vladimir Mashkov and Konstantin Lavronenko (The Return, The Banishment). Sergei Makovetsky had to replace Andrey Krasko, who died of a heart attack during filming.

== Historical accuracy ==
On June 9, 1946, Zhukov was appointed commander of the Odessa military district, despite having previously held the post of commander-in-chief of all Soviet ground forces. The operation was codenamed "Operation Masquerade".

The film crew led by Maxim Faitelberg researched the topic to make a documentary about the operation led by Zhukov. The documentary filmmakers faced the problem of secrecy: all official appeals to both state archives and the FSB yielded no results. Then the authors of the film decided to independently find out what was happening in the city at that time. From the documents contained in Stalin's declassified "Special" folder, it is clear that in 1946, more than 500 thousand crimes were recorded throughout the country. Odessa did not stand out in these reports." Odessa historian and writer Viktor Savchenko, author of the book "Masonic Odessa, doubt the reliability of the movie. When the marshal arrived, "Sometimes up to 70 robberies were committed in one night. And in total, 80 people worked in the criminal investigation department...As soon as anyone tried to rob them, the “victims” shot to kill, not even trying to take the criminals alive. The corpses were left lying in the streets for some time as a warning. "They didn’t make arrests, they just shot several hundred people in a couple of months."

Isay Bondarev, who served in the Odessa military commandant's office in 1946 stated, "In my opinion, it is fiction, I didn’t hear anything like that, didn’t see it, didn’t know about it. If there’d been any such talk, as police officers we’d definitely have heard something."

The military command divided the city into sectors, each assigned to a unit commander. Parks, squares, train stations, restaurants and suburbs were also allocated their own guardian. Soldiers laid ambushes, searched suspicious apartments, attics and basements, and checked documents at city entrance and exit points.

New charges were brought against the Marshal for allegedly "abusing his official position, siding with the looters, and removing valuables from Germany for personal gain." On Jan. 20, 1948, the Marshal was recalled from Odessa and put in charge of the less important military district, this time in the Urals.

== Episodes ==
=== Episode 1 ===
Marshal Zhukov, the newly appointed head of the Odessa Military District, arrives in the city, and Odessa's leaders immediately begin to feel the iron grip of the Marshal of Victory. During the night before his arrival, the Criminal Investigation Unit manages to arrest members of Sam "Goosey"’s gang. Running the operation was Lt. Colonel David Gottsman, the head of the Criminal Investigation Unit for the battle against banditry. All of Gottsman’s family and close friends perished during the war. Only his two childhood friends remain – shell-shocked pilot Mark, and Yefim Petrov, ex-pickpocket who became Gottsman’s willing assistant. It was Yefim who "talked" "Goosey" into showing the place where his gang hid their stolen goods. Near this place, in the ruins, Yefim, with the help of homeless boy Mishka "Crucian", finds a deposit of thousand sets of military uniform. Gottsman gives the news to the Military Command, but Prosecutor Naimov declines to investigate, stating that he is busy. And at night, the now guarded deposit sees the arrival of an unknown truck...

=== Episode 2 ===
At night, the now guarded deposit sees the arrival of a truck with an unknown Captain. The guards are shot, and the military goods stolen. Chasing the truck proves fruitless. The bandits set fire to the truck and run it off a cliff. One bandit named Eva Radzakis is killed; the rest escape. It is discovered that Yefim hid several sets of the uniform at his home prior to the raid by the bandits. Using his contacts in the underworld of Odessa, Yefim, through the labels on the uniforms, is able to find out the warehouse they were stolen from. He even obtains a fake bill of goods that the bandits used to transport the goods, and brings it to Rodya, a counterfeiter. Rodya tells Yefim that it was not done by him and he can't help him.

=== Episode 3 ===
The case of the stolen military goods takes a tragic turn of events – Yefim is murdered. Yefim was David Gottsman's close friend and actively aided the investigation. There are almost no leads anywhere in the case, so Gottsman requests a meeting of the gang leaders of Odessa through Uncle Yeshta, kingpin in underworld who happens to live in his home. He asks them to find the man with the captain's uniform and with a scar at his left temple, who turned up several times in the investigation. Respect for Gottsman in the city is such that the thieves agree to help. They discovered that this person is "Chekan", a bandit who appeared in Odessa before the war. It is also discovered that a certain “Academic” is behind the murders and robberies. Only a contrabandist, nicknamed "Greying Greek", knows of "Academic". However, "Greying Greek"’s arrest is to be postponed, as Gottsman’s group is unexpectedly ordered to guard Marshal Zhukov, who is outside in the city. In the crowd surrounding Zhukov, Gottsman once again bumps into Mishka Crucian, who picks Zhukov’s watch in plain sight of everyone without anyone but Gottsman noticing.

=== Episode 4 ===
The case of the stolen uniforms continues grow, but all leads seem to get cut off – the goods were burnt in the truck, Yefim was found murdered, "Greying Greek" was finally arrested, but was shot dead during his transport to the station. The only real discovery was that the operations were led by "Chekan", and that the mastermind behind them was some secret “Academic”. At night, "Chekan"’s gang attempt to take away weapons from a military depot, but are caught by password checks put in place by the city’s Military Quartermaster, Vorobyov. The bandits escape with a firefight, and in two hours, Quartermaster Vorobyov is found murdered. According to doctor Arsenin, the murderers wanted to imitate a suicide. Due to the difficulty of the case, Gottsman’s group is strengthened with another member – Prosecutor’s Assistant Major Vitaliy Krechetov. Simultaneously, the Counterintelligence Unit discovers that "Chekan" was educated at a German intelligence school, where he met a top-secret agent nicknamed “Academic”, but no-one questioned has seen the “Academic” face to face. During an attempt to arrest "Chekan", two Counterintelligence officers are killed, and "Chekan" escapes. Chekan's girlfriend, Ida, convinces him to run away with the contrabandists to Turkey, but this does not fit in with the “Academic’s” plans...

=== Episode 5 ===
When "Chekan" attempts to leave Odessa, his assistant, Tolya "Zhivchik", informs seemingly leader "Shtekhel" of it and Ida is taken prisoner while "Chekan" is given a new task – selling criminals TT pistols. As a result of the new weapons, Odessa is once again drowned in a wave of murders and robberies. Within several days, Gottsman discovers through sharper Alex "Know nothing" that the weapons are passing through "Chekan". He tells Gottsman the location and time of the next delivery of weapons. An ambush is planned, but "Chekan" doesn't come to the meeting. It becomes evident that an informant is working within the ranks of the Criminal Investigation Unit. Major Dovjik, of the CIU, finds a chance to place a rat in the gang – arrested bandit Sam "Goosey". However, Gottsman himself is arrested by the MGB, after heated argument with Marshal Zhukov during a conference, and been sent out by the Marshal. Within an hour, a case of an anti-Soviet plot is fabricated against Gottsman.

=== Episode 6 ===
Marshal Zhukov doesn't forget the shrewd head of the CI Unit. He orders closure of "anti-Soviet" case, and release of Gottsman. It seems that everything bad is in the past. Gottsman adopts ex-homeless boy and pickpocket Mishka "Crucian" who is now a pupil of a boarding school for gifted children. All-loved singer Leonid Utyosov arrives for a single concert in Odessa. The whole city turns up for the show, and, as a sign of respect, entire underworld announces a "non-working" day for all criminals and even catch and beat up those who decide to pickpocket during concert. It turns out that Utyosov's unexpected arrival is part of Marshal Zhukov's plan. The concert is unexpectedly interrupted, and the leaders of Odessa gangs are arrested. The Military Counter Intelligence Unit MGB is behind the operation, but "Chekan"’s gang was preparing as well. The “Academic”, obviously knowing of Zhukov's operation, decides to make use of the Marshal's mistake. When riots in Odessa begin, "Chekan" sends his gang, together with the rioters, to military weapons caches...

=== Episode 7 ===
Zhukov's blunder leads to unexpected results – the arrest of Odessa's gang leaders leads to mass riots. Weapons caches are robbed, and a fresh wave of banditry descends upon Odessa. Through Sam "Goosey", the CI Unit discovers where "Chekan" is hiding, but counterfeiter Rodya interrupts the arrest. "Chekan" escapes once again, and Rodya is taken to the station. During the interrogation, a call, apparently from Major Dovjik who stayed at the arrest site, comes through, requesting that Gottsman come at once. Rodya is locked in an iron closet, at Gottsman's request. When Gottsman and Krechetov return, Rodya is found strangled with a necklace cord. David Gottsman figures out his killer, Army Guard Luzhov. It becomes obvious that Luzhov wasn't acting alone, and that the accomplice is close by. During an escape attempt, Luzhov is shot dead by Gottsman's assistant Captain Yakimenko.

=== Episode 8 ===
After several troublesome days, Marshal Zhukov realises that it is necessary to take extreme measures. Gottsman recommends immediately releasing Odessa's thieves. He is supported by the head of the Counter Intelligence Unit Colonel Chusov, although, in a private meeting with Zhukov, Chusov admits his intent to deal with Odessa's crime personally. The thieves are released under strict conditions dictated by Gottsman – namely, to call off their gangs and return the stolen weapons. The thieves agree, and Odessa becomes temporarily quiet. Acting on Krechetov's advice, Gottsman invites Nora, Yefim's ex-partner, to the theater, but Nora doesn't arrive. Something was pushing her away from Gottsman; something was preventing her from coming to him. Meanwhile, the bandits seem to be one step ahead of the investigation. Gottsman continuously summons his co-workers, attempting to reconstruct in detail the chain of events on the day when Rodya was killed, and each person's place in that chain. It was now known that, without a doubt, the “Academic” (or one of his employees) is working within the walls of the CI Unit.

=== Episode 9 ===
Marshal Zhukov orders the commencement of Operation “Masquerade”- military intelligence officers were dressed in expensive suits, and given money and weapons. A day before the beginning of the operation, an assassination attempt was carried out on Gottsman. By a happy coincidence, Gottsman spent the night at Krechetov's house, and a distant relative dies instead of Gottsman. However, news of Gottsman's alleged death spreads through Odessa like wildfire. Thieves immediately relax and begin to commit crime with a new spirit. At the same time, Victor Platov appears in Odessa. Platov was a platoon leader in Gottsman's command, and, before the war, got involved in Odessa's criminal underworld. Platov immediately visits the owner of a gambling house. Meanwhile, Gottsman has no doubt of a traitor within the ranks of the CI Unit. Everyone seems to fall into his circle of suspects – Captain Yakimenko, who shot Luzhov dead, Major Dovjik, with his strange contacts in the criminal world, and military doctor Arsenin, who served in the Far East and who was, on more than one occasion, interested in the investigation.

=== Episode 10 ===
Bandits are constantly ambushed and shot in Odessa, as a result of Operation “Masquerade”. It quickly becomes apparent to Gottsman that the operation was planned by the Counterintelligence Unit – the intelligence officers didn't miss even once, and are silent when interrogated. Captain Rusnochenko recognizes "Chekan" on a tram. A firefight ensues, which ends with Rusnochenko's arrest, "Fisheyed", another bandit, being shot dead and "Chekan"’s escape. While investigating "Fisheyed"’s shooting, Major Dovjik locates a flat where Ida is hiding. Ida refuses to betray "Chekan", but agrees to show the CI Unit where the stolen weapons are hidden. One day before, Dovjik brought Gottsman to a strange old psychiatrist. The blind man specialized in psychoanalysis, who, during Nazi occupation, worked with the Germans in an intelligence school. He knew several things about the “Academic”, but his description was vague and unclear, suiting almost any member of the CI Unit – Dovjik, who suspiciously quickly and easily found Ida, Yakimenko, who, as a sniper, strangely missed and killed Luzhov, and Vitaliy Krechetov, who worked as an investigator at the Second Belorussian Front, but somehow didn't remember a scandalous criminal case in 1943.

=== Episode 11 ===
Military doctor Arsenin discovers that Major Krechetov didn't serve at the Second Belorussian Front. This is confirmed by Gottsman's new driver, and appears as a serious argument against Krechetov. Along with other facts, this points to one conclusion – that Krechetov is the “Academic”, and Gottsman receives a warrant for his arrest, but Gottsman's conclusion turns out to be hasty. Krechetov reveals that he served as part of a group of commanding subfield personnel, together with the Secretary of the UWB and other equally important people. Colonel Chusov, head of the Counterintelligence Unit, confirms Krechetov's story. Krechetov remembers the knot that was used to strangle Rodya – a Samurai's knot, which points to doctor Arsenin, who served in the Far East. Arsenin seemingly disappears. "Chekan"’s girlfriend Ida brings detectives to the place where "Chekan"’s stolen weapons are hidden, but "Chekan" organizes an ambush and recaptures Ida. Meanwhile, the nightly shootings continue. As a result of Operation “Masquerade”, hundreds of thieves and gangsters are killed. Each day, Odessa buries more and more people.

=== Episode 12 ===
The CI Unit continues to search for military doctor Arsenin, but all their attempts are fruitless. The “Academic”, who turns out to be Krechetov after all, cuts all leads to the doctor. Gottsman suggests a course of action to Colonel Chusov, with the first part of the plan being to end Operation “Masquerade”. Chusov listens to Gottsman, and informs Marshal Zhukov of his thoughts. Meanwhile, the “Academic”, Vitaliy Krechetov, tells "Shtekhel" that he is being suspected, and that his gang needs to lie low for a while, waiting for further orders. Ex-criminal Victor Platov is searched on "Chekan"’s orders, but the search ends before it can begin – Platov shoots "Chekan"’s gangsters dead. Gottsman understands that the plan he suggested to Chusov was highly dangerous, and that it could easily backfire on him. Colonel Chusov unexpectedly arrives at the CI Station and arrests Gottsman.

=== Episode 13 ===
Vitaliy Krechetov, the “Academic”, feels that a major failure was close by and unavoidable. However, at the last moment, the situation shifts to a largely favourable situation for him – the Counterintelligence Unit arrests Gottsman and his wife, Nora. Operation “Masquerade” is concluded, and military investigators begin to leave town. Shortly afterwards, Marshal Zhukov announces military training in Moldavia, which means that, in several days, only the sentinel garrison and the police will be patrolling the city. Krechetov realises that he has a real chance to carry out a well-conceived operation and capture Odessa. He also realises that his own gang forces will be inadequate, and that he needs the aid of gang units operating in the forest. Krechetov recruits the help of a contact from Kiev, who turns out to be Victor Platov.

=== Episode 14 ===
Krechetov's girlfriend Antonina follows him to a meeting with "Chekan". Realizing that he is a traitor, she confronts Krechetov and is stabbed to death. Meanwhile, Tolya "Zhivchik", "Chekan"’s assistant, hands out Red Army uniforms and weapons to various gang members, enabling them to pose as military personnel as part of Krechetov’s plan. Victor Platov rendezvous with the forest gangs, handing out uniforms to them as well. As Krechetov, "Chekan" and "Zhivchik" prepare to capture Odessa, they realize that it is filled with disguised Counterintelligence agents. "Zhivchik" is arrested, and "Chekan" manages to inform Krechetov before he is shot and severely injured in a firefight with Rusnochenko. Gottsman arrives and arrests Krechetov, informing his that his [Gottsman's] arrest was a red herring. Captain Yakimenko, together with a division of snipers and machine-gunners, intercepts three trucks with the disguised forest gang members. Victor Platov, who turns out to be a double-agent working for Counterintelligence, is shot and injured by the forest gang leader during the intercept. All gang members are disarmed and arrested. Meanwhile, Gottsman reveals to Krechetov that the knot used to murder Rodya was not, in fact, Japanese, and that this is what gave Krechetov away. When asking for a cigarette, Krechetov grabs a hidden pistol and shoots the two arresting officers, taking Gottsman hostage. Meanwhile, on a steamer ship, "Shtekhel", Ida and several gangsters spot "Chekan" in a rowboat. "Shtekhel" orders a gangster to shoot "Chekan", tying up loose ends. Ida attacks the gangster, who stabs her to death. Her body is placed in the rowboat, but "Shtekhel" realizes that he hasn't taken her purse. As he descends into the rowboat, the gangsters shoot him. Krechetov reveals to Gottsman that he killed Yefim and doctor Arsenin, burying the latter's body at sea. Krechetov then attempts to pass by the police by keeping Gottsman at gunpoint, but Gottsman pushes him off a ledge onto a vertical steel pipe, which impales Krechetov. As Krechetov's body is carried away, Gottsman travels to a military boarding school, where he watches Mishka in the school's choir. The narrator's voice-over states that “no one knows where the truth and where the fiction in this story lies, and whether this story happened at all, know only the chestnuts on the French boulevard, the Black Sea and the city of Odessa...”

== Characters ==
=== Military ===
- Lt. Colonel David Markovich Gottsman (Vladimir Mashkov)
- Major Vitaliy Egorovich Krechetov (Mikhail Porechenkov)
- Marshal of the Soviet Union Georgy Konstantinovich Zhukov (Vladimir Menshov)

Marshal Zhukov arrives in Odessa as head of the Military District in the summer of 1946. He appears several times throughout the story, having ordered Operation "Masquerade" (see synopsis) and also having ordered military training in Moldavia, although this is a ploy. Zhukov orders the arrest of all the thief leaders of Odessa, which turns out to be a huge blunder, as their dormant gangs become active and begin rioting. He is portrayed as very strict, but fair - having rescued Gottsman once from prison, and also having given Mishka Karas' his watch, which the boy stole and then returned.

- Colonel Chusov (Yuri Lakhin)

Colonel Chusov is the head of the Counterintelligence Unit of Odessa. He is the mastermind behind Operation "Masquerade", and also supports Zhukov's arrests of thief leaders. Chusov recommends Operation "Masquerade" instead of the arrests, after their failure is evident. He also supports Gottsman's plan of disguising Counterintelligence agents in Episode 14.

- Colonel Andrey Ostapovich Omel’yanchuk (Victor Smirnov)

Colonel Omel'yanchuk is the head of the Criminal Investigation Unit in Odessa. He is a fair but occasionally soft leader who respects Gottsman's decisions. During the riots caused by Zhukov's arrest of thief leaders, Omel'yanchuk's house is set alight, and his wife is injured.

- War Surgeon and Medical Examiner Andrey Victorovich Arsenin (Alexandr Sirin)
- Captain Alexei Yekimenko (Fyodor Dobronravov)
- Major "Makhal Makhalovich" Dovjik (Boris Kamorzin)
- Lieutenant Lyonya Tishak (Alexandr Golubyov)
- Army Guard Private Luzhov (Oleg Kulayev)

Luzhov possesses acrobatic skills, using them to enter a locked iron closet using a ceiling shaft and strangle counterfeiter Rodya who was locked inside. He is shot dead by Captain Yekimenko during an escape attempt after being arrested.

- Efreitor Okhryatin (Konstantin Balakirev)

Efreitor Okhryatin is an army guard who works at the CI Unit station. He guarded Rodya's locked iron closet, and suspicion initially falls on him in relation to Rodya's murder.

- Pilot Mark (Alexei Kryutsenko)

Mark is one of Gottsman's friends. He was shell-shocked during the war, and now lives at home with his wife, Galiya. Mark suffered brain damage from the blast, and, as a result, lost most of his memory, muscle control and lateral thinking. He occasionally has mental fits and, on one occasion, attempted to commit suicide, only stopped by Gottsman and Krechetov. On other occasions, Mark's memory temporarily returns, such as when looking at photographs.

- Ex-Squadron Leader Victor Platov (Sergei Ugryumov)

=== Gangsters ===
- "Chekan" (Igor Stanislavovoch Chekan) (Konstantin Lavronenko)
- Tolya "Zhivchik" (Maxim Drozd)
- Eva Radzakis (Igor Artashonov)
- "Shtekhel" (Konstantin Zheldin)

=== Civilians ===
- Yefim Petrov (Fima-Poluzhid) (Sergei Makovetsky)
- Ida Kashetinskaya (Kseniya Rappoport)
- Antonina Petrovna Tsar’ko (Polina Agureeva)
- Aunt Pesya (Svetlana Kryuchkova)
- Emmik (Emmanuel Gershovich) (Alexandr Semchev)
- Celia (Beata Makovskaya)
- Nora (Elena Bruner) (Lika Nifontova)
- Mishka "Karas’" (Karasyov) (Kolya Spiridonov)
- Galiya (Diana Malaya) - Mark's wife
- Rodya (Valeriy Troshin)

Rodya is a counterfeiter who operates in Odessa. He interrupted the Criminal Investigation Unit during "Chekan"'s arrest attempt, and was arrested himself. After being locked in a guarded closet, Rodya was strangled by Army Guard Luzhov, who, as an acrobat, managed to enter the closet through a shaft in the ceiling.

== Views of Ukrainian nationalists ==
Ukrainian cultural figures criticize the "Liquidation", alluding to the presence of Ukrainophobia in it.

"Remember: not so long ago ideological enemies of Soviet authorities, and it doesn't matter who they were in real life, have always been positive characters in the movies, especially in the times of "perestroika" and the Russian post-Soviet period. Nowadays, those who do not like the Soviet regime have to be destroyed. Isn't there a hint that the Russian culture, and in particular — movies, again ready to defend and protect Soviet values exposed to obstruction in former times? Maybe I cringe cards a little, however, I want to pity Academician mentioned above, despite all his treacherous nature: he was against the "Soviets" but he was killed for his convictions", — Andriy Kokotiukha, writer.

" ... the situation is schizophrenic: on the one hand there is bloodshed, people die, whether they are Russian or Ukrainian speaking or a mix of both, no difference, those who identify themselves as Ukrainians are dying. And at the same time, only in the first week of September, 10 Ukrainian channels showed 71 Russian TV series, including "Liquidation", where security officers kill banderivetses." — Oksana Zabuzhko about number of Russian TV product in Ukraine and 2014 Russian military intervention in Ukraine.

== Prohibition on display and distribution in Ukraine ==
In late November 2014 the film actor Michael Porechenkov made illegal trip to not controlled by Ukraine Donetsk, where he together with the separatists of Donetsk People's Republic (DPR or DNR) fired a machine-gun in the general direction of the positions of the Ukrainian military at the airport in Donetsk. The Security Service of Ukraine suspected the actor in shootings of civilians of Donetsk. After the publicity of these events there was a scandal. Activists of the campaign "Boycott Russian Films" demanded to ban in Ukraine movies with Michael Porechenkov. On November 31, 2014 the State Agency of Ukraine for Cinema on the proposal of the Ministry of Culture of Ukraine and the Security Service of Ukraine canceled the permission for distribution and display of 69 films and TV series featuring Michael Porechenkov, including the serial "Liquidation".
