= On the Line (1984 film) =

- Directed by: José Luis Borau
- Written by: José Luis Borau; David Greig; Barbara Probst Solomon
- Starring: David Carradine
- Cinematography: Teo Escamilla; Misha Suslov
- Release date: 1984
- Countries: Spain; United States; Australia

On the Line is a 1984 film starring David Carradine.

It was also known as Río abajo.

== Cast ==
- David Carradine
- Scott Wilson
- Victoria Abril

== Production ==
It was filmed over four years.

== Release ==
The film was released theatrically in Spain in 1984. It was released in the United States three years later.
