= Baby Blue Marine =

1976 film by John D. Hancock

- Directed by: John D. Hancock (as John Hancock)
- Written by: Stanford Whitmore
- Produced by: Leonard Goldberg; Aaron Spelling
- Starring: Jan-Michael Vincent
- Cinematography: László Kovács (as Laszlo Kovacs)
- Edited by: Marion Rothman
- Music by: Fred Karlin
- Production company: Spelling-Goldberg Productions
- Distributed by: Columbia Pictures
- Release date: May 5, 1976
- Running time: 90 minutes
- Country: United States
- Language: English

Baby Blue Marine is a 1976 American drama film set during World War II that was directed by John D. Hancock and starred Jan-Michael Vincent. The feature film was produced by Aaron Spelling and Leonard Goldberg.

== Plot ==
Marion “Hedge” Hedgepeth washes out of Marine recruit training during World War II and is sent home in unadorned light blue fatigues. The issue of fatigues to former recruits is standard practice since their civilian clothes are sent home at the start of training. The failed recruits receive the derogatory nickname Baby Blue Marine due to the fatigues.

Hedge meets a Marine Raider veteran at a stopover on his bus ride home to St. Louis. The young, highly decorated Marine has aged beyond his years, with battle-scars and prematurely gray hair. Not wishing to return to the war, he knocks Hedge out and trades uniforms with him. Now penniless, Hedge must hitchhike the rest of the way home in the Raider uniform. The idyllic small town of Bidwell, California, below Mount Shasta, treats him like a hero. Hedge is befriended by Rose, a recent high-school graduate and waiter at a diner, and Mr. Elmore, a local who lost his son in the attack on Pearl Harbor. He also meets Army Private Danny Phelps, who just finished basic training and is awaiting assignment to a military typing pool. Rose invites Hedge to stay with her family for a few days, and Hedge bunks with her brother, Barney. Rose and Hedge fall in love, and he confesses his story, explaining he stayed quiet because he doesn't want the Raider to get in trouble for deserting.

When three teenagers boys escape from a Japanese-American internment camp, the residents of Bidwell join the small force of camp guards in searching the woods. Mr. Elmore reminds everyone that these are young American citizens, but many locals, particularly Phelps, are hellbent on killing the "Japs". Hedge finds the boys first. They admit they are sick of being unfairly held and are want to return home to San Francisco. Phelps watches the scene unforld from a nearby ridge and shoots, hitting Hedge, who falls into the rapids of a mountain stream. The Japanese-American teens help Mr. Elmore and a repentant Phelps to save Hedge from drowning, and stop his bleeding. Thinking he might die, Hedge tells Rose to tell everyone his true story.

After the war, Hedge returns to Bidwell and Rose, having served as a corporal under General Patton in the U.S. Third Army.

== Cast ==
- Jan-Michael Vincent as Marion
- Glynnis O'Connor as Rose
- Katherine Helmond as Mrs. Hudkins
- Dana Elcar as Sheriff Wenzel
- Bert Remsen as Mr. Hudkins
- Bruno Kirby as Pop Mosley (credited as B. Kirby Jr.)
- Richard Gere as Raider
- Art Lund as Mr. Elmore
- Michael Conrad as Drill Instructor
- Allan Miller as Captain Bittman
- Michael LeClair as Barney Hudkins
- Will Seltzer as Private Phelps
- Kenneth Tobey as Buick Driver (credited as Ken Tobey)
- Lelia Goldoni as Mrs. Townsley
- Marshal Efron as Cook
- Barton Heyman as Barker
- Adam Arkin as Rupe
- Damon Douglas as Dobbs
- Barry Greenberg as Idiot #1
- John Blyth Barrymore as Idiot #2
- John Calvin as Paratrooper
- Richard Narita as Masamura
- Evan C. Kim as Harakawa (credited as Evan Kim)
- Keone Young as Katsu
- Phyllis Glick as Girl Behind Bus Counter
- William Martel as The Bartender
- Warren Burton as Second Serviceman
- Abraham Alvarez as First Serviceman
- Bill Sorrells as Coach
- Carole White as Girl On Bus (credited as Carole Ita White)
- Duncan Gamble as Sailor
- Tita Bell as Girl #1
- Lani O'Grady as Girl #2
- Barbara Dodd as Mother
- Tom Lee McFadden as First Shore Patrolman
- James Carroll as Second Shore Patrolman (credited as James Lough)

== Reception ==
Film critic Roger Ebert gave the film 2½ out of 4 stars.

== See also ==
- List of American films of 1976
