= Let's Scare Jessica to Death =

1971 film by John D. Hancock

- Theatrical release poster
- Directed by: John Hancock
- Written by: John Hancock; Lee Kalcheim
- Produced by: Charles B. Moss Jr.; William Badalato
- Starring: Zohra Lampert; Barton Heyman; Kevin O'Connor; Gretchen Corbett; Mariclare Costello
- Cinematography: Robert M. Baldwin
- Edited by: Murray Solomon
- Music by: Orville Stoeber
- Production company: The Jessica Company
- Distributed by: Paramount Pictures
- Release date: August 27, 1971
- Running time: 89 minutes
- Country: United States
- Language: English
- Budget: $250,000
- Box office: $47,651 (opening week)

Let's Scare Jessica to Death is a 1971 American psychological horror film co-written and directed by John Hancock in his directorial debut, and starring Zohra Lampert, Barton Heyman, Kevin O'Connor, Gretchen Corbett, and Mariclare Costello. The film depicts the nightmarish experiences of a psychologically fragile woman who comes to believe that another strange, mysterious young woman she has let into her home may actually be a vampire.

Initially conceived by writer Lee Kalcheim as a satirical horror film about a group of hippies preyed upon by a monster in a lake, the screenplay was significantly reworked after director Hancock signed on to the project. Hancock took certain elements from Kalcheim's script, but opted to write a straightforward horror film set at a remote farmhouse. Inspired by Henry James' novella The Turn of the Screw and Robert Wise's film The Haunting (1963), Hancock wanted to center the screenplay on a protagonist whose credibility interpreting events could be questioned by the audience so they could use their imagination. Filming of Let's Scare Jessica to Death took place in various towns and villages in Connecticut, largely in Middlesex County.

Though completed without a distributor, Let's Scare Jessica to Death was purchased by Paramount Pictures, who gave it a wide release in the United States on August 27, 1971, and heavily marketed it as a vampire film. It received mixed reviews from critics at the time, with some praising its atmosphere but criticizing the performances as inconsistent and offering varying responses to the screenplay's ambiguous nature. Though criticism of the film has been divided, it went on to attain a cult following, and some film scholars have drawn comparisons to Joseph Sheridan Le Fanu's novel Carmilla (1871).

In 2006, the Chicago Film Critics Association pronounced Let's Scare Jessica to Death one of the scariest films ever made, and in 2012, it was ranked in the British Film Institute's Sight & Sound poll as the 849th greatest film of all time. The film was scarcely available in home media formats for several decades, available only on Betamax and VHS until 2006, when Paramount issued a DVD version. A Blu-ray was released by Scream Factory in January 2020, followed by a 4K UHD Blu-ray by Vinegar Syndrome in 2025.

== Plot ==
Jessica has been released from a mental institution to the care of her husband, Duncan, who has given up his job as string bassist for the New York Philharmonic and purchased a rundown farmhouse outside of the city. When Jessica, Duncan, and their hippie friend Woody arrive, they are surprised to find a mysterious drifter, Emily, squatting in the home. When Emily offers to move on, Jessica invites her to dine with them and stay the night.

The following day, Jessica, seeing how attracted Woody is to Emily, asks Duncan to invite her to stay indefinitely. Jessica begins hearing voices and sees a mysterious young blonde woman looking at her from a distance before disappearing. Later, Jessica is grabbed by someone under the water in the cove while she is swimming. Jessica is afraid to talk about these things with Duncan or Woody, for fear that they will think she is relapsing. She also becomes aware that Duncan seems to be attracted to Emily, and that the men in the nearby town, all of whom are bandaged in some way, are hostile toward them.

Duncan and Jessica decide to sell antiques found in the house at a local shop, one of which is a silver-framed portrait of the house's former owners, the Bishop family—father, mother, and daughter Abigail. The antiques dealer, Sam Dorker, tells them the story of how Abigail drowned in 1880 just before her wedding day. Legend claims that she is still alive, roving the island as a vampire. Jessica finds the story fascinating, but Duncan, afraid that hearing about such things will upset his wife, cuts Dorker short. Later, as Jessica prepares to make a headstone rubbing on Abigail Bishop's grave, she notices the blonde woman beckoning her to follow. The woman leads Jessica to a cliff, at the bottom of which lies Dorker's bloodied body. By the time Jessica finds Duncan, however, the body is gone. Jessica and Duncan spot the woman standing on the cliff above them, causing Duncan to give chase. When the woman is caught and questioned by the couple, she remains silent and quickly flees when Emily approaches.

That night, Duncan tells Jessica that she needs to return to New York to resume her psychiatric treatment. Jessica forces him to sleep on the couch, where he is seduced by Emily. The next day, Jessica finds the portrait of the Bishop family, which she and Duncan had sold to Dorker the previous day, back in the attic; she observes that Abigail Bishop, as seen on the photo, bears a striking resemblance to Emily. Jessica agrees to go with Emily to swim in the cove. While swimming, Emily vanishes before reemerging from the water in a Victorian wedding gown. Emily attempts to bite Jessica's neck, but Jessica flees, locking herself in her bedroom in the house. Hours pass and Jessica leaves to hitch a ride into town. Woody, who has been working in the orchard, returns to the house, where Emily bites his neck.

When Jessica gets into town, she sees Duncan's car and questions the locals regarding his whereabouts, but no one will speak to her. She observes that the townspeople all bear scars on their necks or wrists. When she notices Sam Dorker amongst them, she flees back toward the house in terror. She collapses in the orchard and later is found by Duncan, who takes her home. In their bedroom, the couple go to lie down. Jessica notices a cut on Duncan's neck, and Emily then enters the room brandishing a knife, with the townsmen following behind her. Jessica flees the house, knocking over Duncan's bass case, which contains the corpse of the mute blonde woman.

Jessica runs through the orchard and comes across Woody's corpse, his throat slashed. At daybreak, Jessica makes it to the ferry and tries to board, but the ferryman, also bearing a scar on his neck, refuses to let her on. She jumps into a nearby rowboat and paddles out into the lake. When a hand reaches into the boat from the water, she stabs the person in the back several times with a pole hook. As the body floats away, Jessica sees that it is Duncan. In voiceover narration, Jessica laments her inability to discern between madness and sanity. From the shore, Emily and the townsmen watch her.

== Cast ==
- Zohra Lampert as Jessica
- Barton Heyman as Duncan
- Kevin O'Connor as Woody
- Gretchen Corbett as The Girl
- Alan Manson as Sam Dorker
- Mariclare Costello as Emily

== Production ==
=== Development ===
"I made it eminently clear to [the producers] that I did not want to do a satire of a horror picture. I wanted to do a movie that was legitimately terrifying."

— Hancock, on writing the screenplay

According to Lee Kalcheim, the original script for the film was far different from the completed film. Purchased by producer Charles B. Moss, Kalcheim's original screenplay, entitled "It Drinks Hippie Blood", followed a group of hippies camping on a cove who are attacked by a creature that lives in the water. Kalcheim described his screenplay as a satire: "John [Hancock] turned-the-screw so to speak, making it a serious, darker theme. The simplicity of the film worked perfectly to create a scary mood."

Hancock agreed to direct the film only as long as he was allowed to redraft the screenplay, and proceeded to rework Kalcheim's original script in both tone and thematic content, but retained certain elements at the request of the producers; the mute girl, played by Gretchen Corbett, for example, was a character from Kalcheim's original script that Moss requested Hancock retain in his redraft. The scene in which the group attempt a séance was also requested to be kept in the film by both Kalcheim and the producers. Hancock stated that "the scenes didn't make much sense to me, but the Mosses felt they would be particularly enjoyable and scary. I trusted their instincts because they had a concrete experience of audiences." Kalcheim is credited as a co-writer on the film under the pseudonym Norman Jonas. Certain elements of the film were drawn from Hancock's own life, such as the apple orchard settings and farmhouse, as he had grown up on an apple orchard, as well as Norman's career as a bassist, as Hancock's father was a professional double-bass player.

In writing the role of Jessica, Hancock sought to create a filmic equivalent to the unreliable narrator in literary fiction. Jessica was partly influenced by the governess in Henry James's novella The Turn of the Screw, as well as the character of Eleanor Lance in Robert Wise's film The Haunting (1963). The theme of evil pervading the protagonist's mind was central: "I was alarmed by the notion that you can't defeat or defuse evil—it forever lives inside and all around us—so I worked that fear inside the story," said Hancock.

=== Casting ===
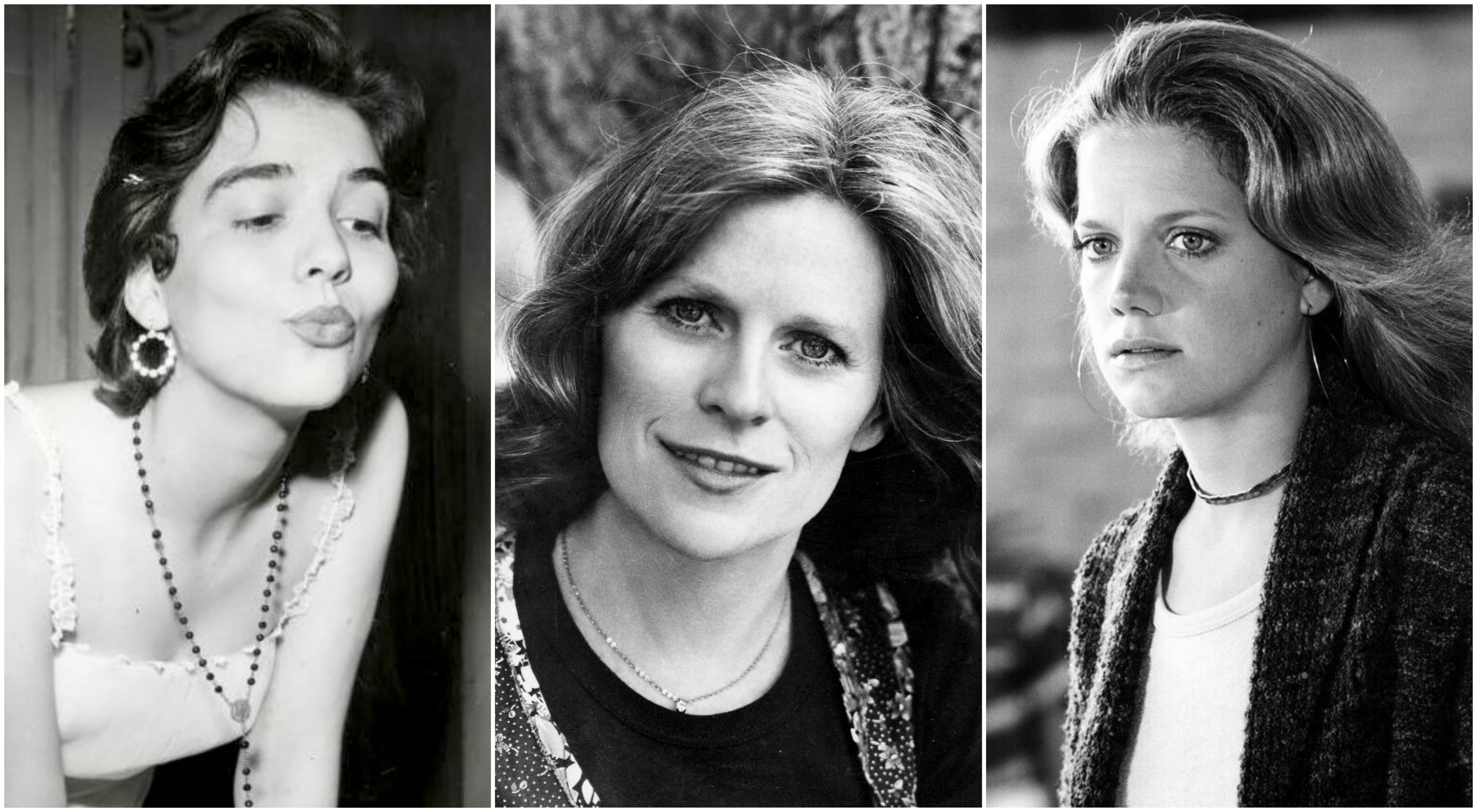
The film's principal female cast, from left to right: Zohra Lampert, Mariclare Costello, and Gretchen Corbett. Of all the cast members, Corbett was the only actress who had not previously worked with director John Hancock.

Hancock, who had worked as a theater director prior, cast the film largely through his connections within the New York theater community, and the majority of the cast consisted of actors with whom Hancock had worked in stage productions. Auditions for the parts were held in the B.S. Moss Offices on Broadway in New York City. Actress Zohra Lampert was cast in the lead role of Jessica, the titular character who finds herself questioning her sanity. She was approached by Hancock, her former boyfriend, while performing in a Broadway production of Mother Courage and Her Children with Anne Bancroft. "I accepted, trusting his judgment," Lampert recalled. "I have a great fondness for John Hancock, and enjoyed working with him very much." Lampert "got lost in her character" as the script resonated with her, and she spent much of her time between takes remaining in character. Hancock recalled of her casting: "I knew she would be perfect for the lead role. Zohra could play the fragility of the character, but she could also authentically convey the fear and the terror."

Mariclare Costello, an actress who had worked as a casting director on Hancock's stage production of The Freaking Out of Stephanie Blake (1967), was cast opposite Lampert as the mysterious hippie, Emily. Hancock was specifically taken by Costello's physical features, which included bright red hair and a pale complexion, which he felt was befitting of the vampiric Emily. Barton Heyman and Kevin O'Connor were given the roles of Jessica's husband Duncan, and the couple's friend Woody, respectively; Hancock had worked with Heyman and O'Connor previously, as they had appeared in his 1967–1968 stage production of A Midsummer Night's Dream. Heyman had been Hancock's first choice in the role of Duncan. Alan Mason, who portrayed the doomed antique dealer Sam Dorker, had also acted in several of Hancock's plays. Gretchen Corbett, also an established New York-based stage actress from Portland, Oregon, was cast as the mysterious mute girl whom Jessica encounters, and was the only performer in the principal cast to have not worked with Hancock prior.

In preparation, both Lampert and Costello worked with acting coach Mira Rostova for their respective roles in the film. To prepare the performers for the tone he hoped to accomplish, Hancock screened several films by Alfred Hitchcock to the cast prior to filming.

=== Filming ===
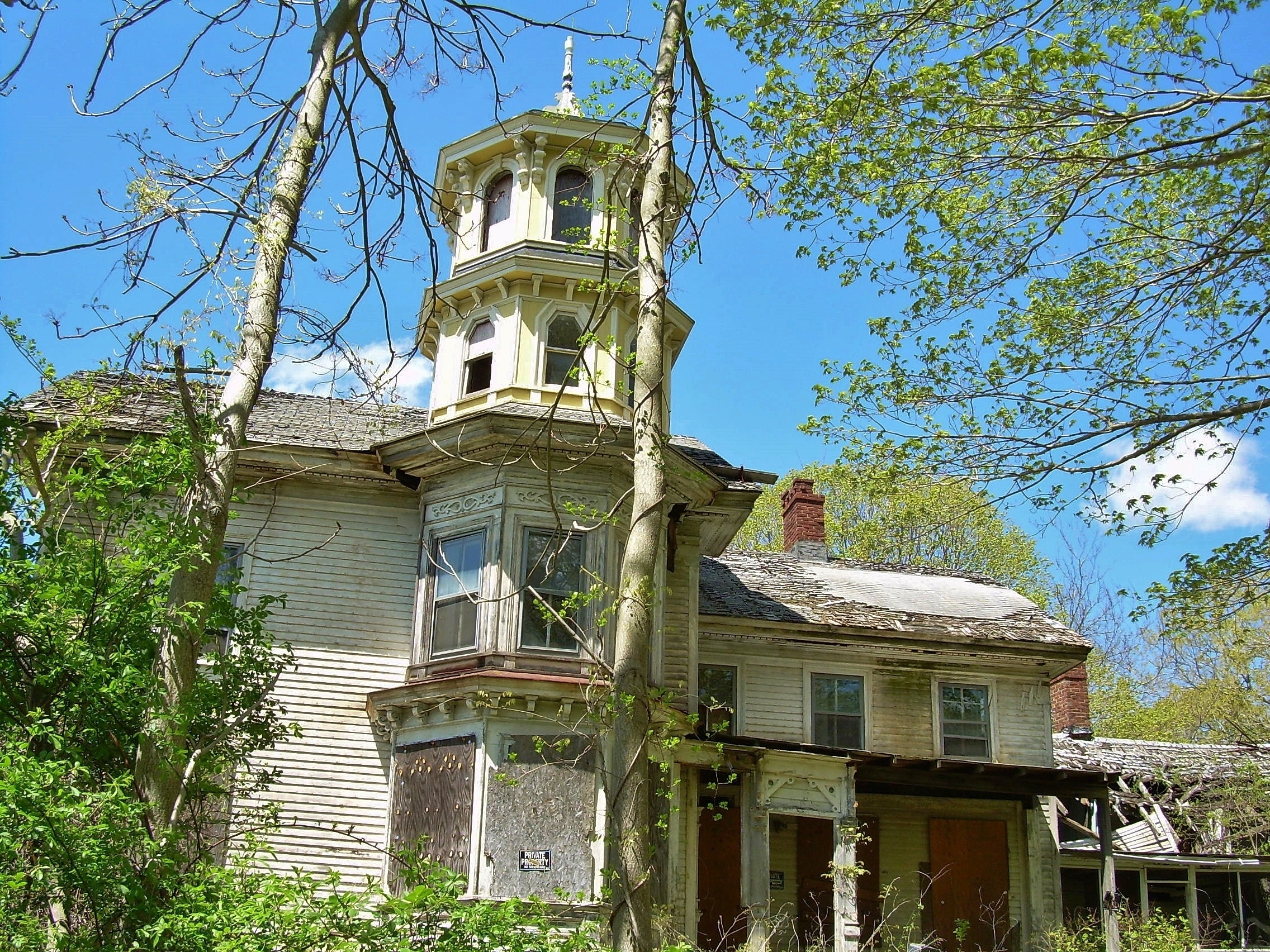
The Piontkowski House in Old Saybrook (May 2020)

Let's Scare Jessica to Death was filmed over a period of 26 days in the fall of 1970, in various towns in Connecticut; the production budget was $250,000. Principal photography began in November of that year in Old Saybrook. The exteriors of the house were shot at a farmhouse in Old Saybrook known over the years as Fairview Farm and the Piontkowski House, while the E. E. Dickinson Mansion, located in the village of Essex, was used for the interior shots of the home. While shooting, the cast and crew used multiple rooms in the expansive mansion for dressing rooms and a headquarters for the film company.

Additional photography occurred in the villages of Chester, Lyme, and East Haddam. The Chester–Hadlyme Ferry is featured in the film crossing the Connecticut River. Co-producer William Badalato had suggested the location: "My wife and I had a weekend house in Chester, Connecticut. We loved the area and shared our feelings with John [Hancock] and [producer Charles B. Moss Jr.] After a preliminary scout we all agree that this was where Jessica should be filmed."

Badalato recalled of Hancock's direction: "He was always responsible to our budget and was very confident with the actors. He felt close to the material as it spoke to him in some bizarre way. John actually used to take his own pulse while he was shooting and I was completely intrigued by this." Because the film was shot in the fall months, the sequences that were shot in the lake required the actors to swim in very cold water. The scene where Costello's character emerges from the lake in a wedding dress was filmed in late November on a day it had snowed.

== Music ==
Let's Scare Jessica to Death was one of the first horror films to prominently feature a synthesizer in its musical score, which was composed by Orville Stoeber. The song sung by Costello's character was initially going to be dubbed by a professional singer, but Hancock and the producers decided to keep her voice as it was recorded.

== Analysis and themes ==
=== Comparison to Carmilla ===
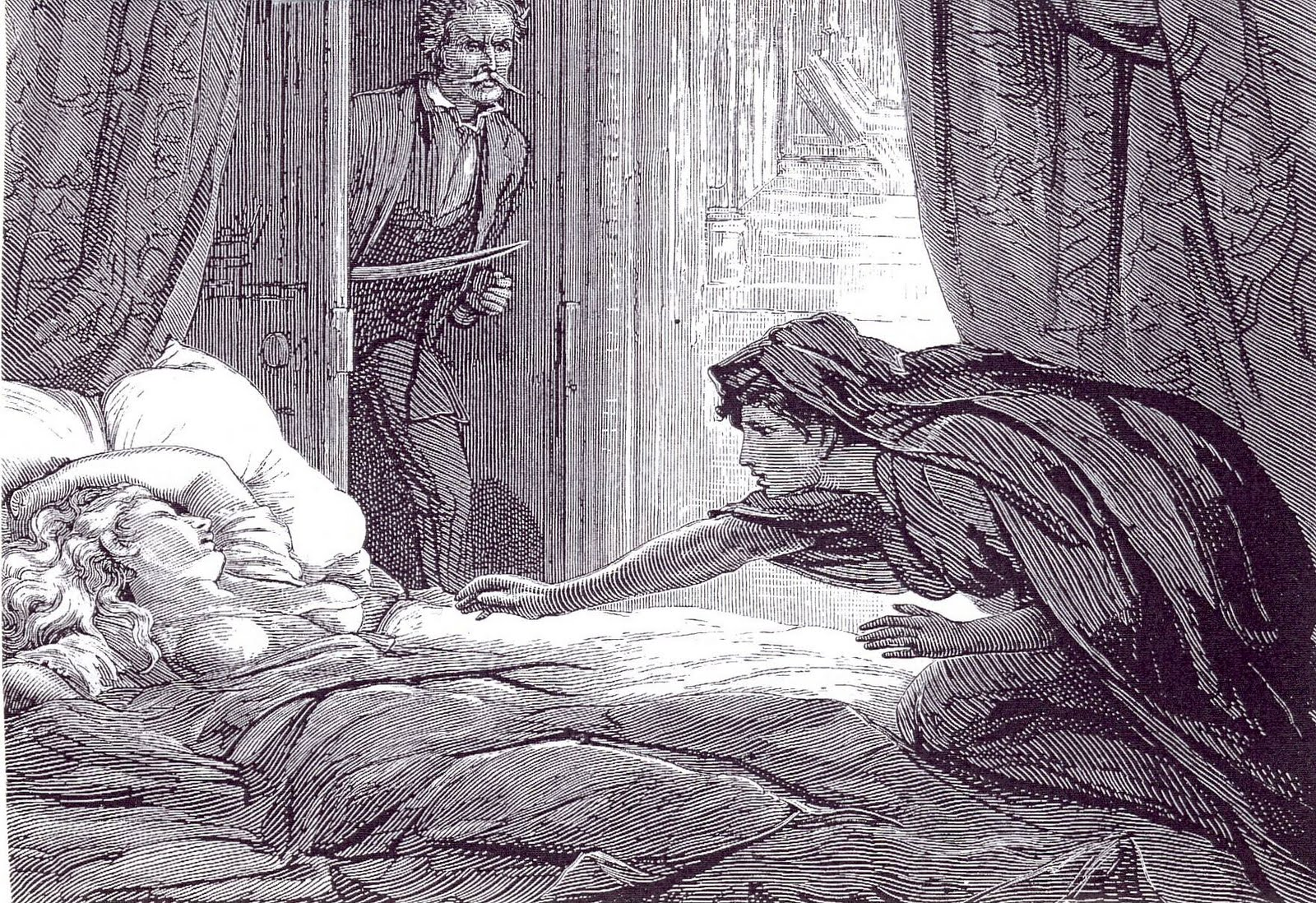
The film has been compared by several literature and film scholars to the novella Carmilla (1872)

Some literature and film scholars have drawn comparisons between Let's Scare Jessica to Death and Irish novelist Sheridan Le Fanu's novel Carmilla (1871), which tells the story of a vampiress. Scholar Nancy West cites the film as one of several examples of horror films of the 1970s that directly lift the premise of the novel and place it in other historical or cultural contexts: "This languid movie reimagines Le Fanu's Laura as Jessica...like Carmilla, Emily is a horror of a houseguest, and after both men have been bitten by her, it becomes apparent that Emily is none other than the one-hundred-year-old vampire who in the course of time has attacked all the men in the nearby town...Is Emily an imaginative projection of Jessica's murderous feelings toward her husband? Of Jessica's frustration with a mental condition that has rendered her sadly dependent on men? The film never makes clear."

=== Mental illness and unreliable narration ===
In a 2013 article published by the Film Society of Lincoln Center, Erik Luers commented on the film's dubious portrayal of reality and Jessica's unreliable interpretation of events, noting that "each sound and image presents a hazy version of reality. As the plot develops, we learn that the world around Jessica is scarier than anything her mind could concoct."

Reviewing the film for its 50th anniversary, Kenneth Lowe of Paste alternately felt that the film "uses psychological horror techniques and roots its terror in the gaslighting of a vulnerable woman," interpreting Jessica's point of view as consistent with reality: "The movie's framing device tries to plant a seed of doubt in the viewer's mind that what they've seen can be fully trusted. I think it's the only inelegant part of the film, really. After all, wanting an audience to believe that a woman is hysterical and not in control of her senses, that's the oldest trick, by the oldest villains."

PopMatters's Brian Holcomb suggests that the film's presentation of events as purely subjective to Jessica, citing how the character's thoughts are narrated throughout via voiceover: "We experience this story with her and even when the film presents scenes where she is not present, they appear to be moments she could be imagining. The film is Jessica's version of what happened. What happened to Jessica, her husband Duncan and their friend Woody at their farmhouse in upstate New York cannot truly be known. Almost all of it may be Jessica's paranoid fantasy."

=== Decline of counterculture ===
The decline of 1960s counterculture has been cited as a theme by critics and observers, as well as by director John Hancock. The hearse that Duncan and Jessica drive, which has the word "love" spray-painted on it, has been noted as a blatant reference to the death of "hippie values." Critic and biographer Michael Doyle describes the film as a "haunting elegy" for the failures of the hippie movement. Doyle elaborates that the film "isolates and illuminates the death and corruption of counterculture values" from the era, and anticipates the "festering paranoia" that occurred throughout the 1970s, with the Watergate scandal, the assassinations of Harvey Milk and George Moscone, and the Jonestown massacre. Hancock, though ambivalent about whether it was consciously or subconsciously integrated into the screenplay, has conceded this interpretation, commenting: "You could already feel that negativity brewing when we were making Jessica; that things weren't working out the way some of us had hoped and dreamed they would."

== Release ==
Filmed without a distributor and produced independently (under The Jessica Company), Let's Scare Jessica to Death was sold to Paramount Pictures in early 1971. Frank Yablans, then an executive at Paramount, devised the film's title as they felt Hancock's working title, which was simply Jessica, was not commercially viable. Paramount gave the film a wide theatrical release in the United States. It premiered in New York City on August 27, 1971, (Note: While the Internet Movie Database has formerly listed the film's release date as August 6, 1971, the American Film Institute notes its release date as August 27, 1971; this coincides with Roger Greenspun's published review in The New York Times, dated August 28, 1971 (see Greenspun, 1971). Aside from the IMDb, no reliable sources corroborate the release date as August 6.) and opened in Los Angeles, California the following week, on September 1.

=== Marketing ===
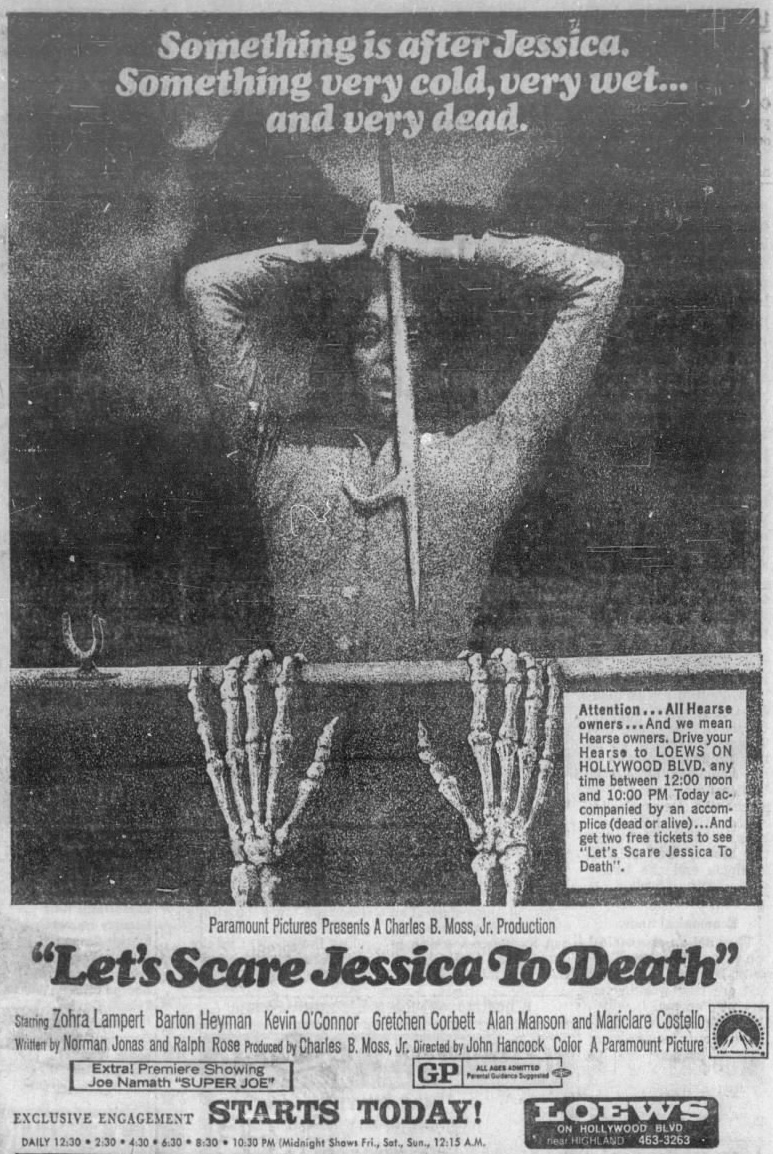
Newspaper advertisement in the Los Angeles Times promoting the film with a ticket giveaway to hearse drivers

Paramount Pictures devised a variegated marketing campaign to promote Let's Scare Jessica to Death, emphasizing it as a vampire film. As part of their press book, Paramount offered theaters promotional ideas to help boost ticket sales, which included write-in contests from potential patrons, free passes for individuals who had recently donated blood to the American Red Cross, and several different radio contests.

Plastic vampire fangs were given to patrons at some cinemas, while a horse-drawn hearse and coffins were parked in front of Manhattan's Criterion Theatre during the film's opening week. A $100 prize contest was also held outside the Criterion Theatre for hearse drivers with the "best decorated" hearse, with stars Lampert and Costello, producer Charles B. Moss, and WABC radio personality Bruce Morrow serving as judges. On September 1, 1971, the Los Angeles Times ran a print advertisement offering two free tickets to any motorists driving a hearse who passed by the Loews Theatre on Hollywood Boulevard that day.

=== Home media ===
The film was released on VHS and Beta by Paramount Pictures in 1984, but later went out of print and was difficult to obtain. Paramount released the film on DVD on August 29, 2006, and reissued it on September 15, 2009. Warner Bros. later released the film on August 27, 2013, through its Warner Archive DVD-on-demand service. On July 20, 2019, Scream Factory announced at San Diego Comic-Con that they would be issuing the film on Blu-ray, marking its debut in this format. The Blu-ray was released on January 28, 2020, and includes a commentary track from director John D. Hancock and producer Phil Badalato, interviews with composer Orville Stoeber and historian Kim Newman, a documentary on the filming locations, and other bonus features. The Australian home media label Imprint Films issued a Blu-ray edition the following year. On May 23, 2025, Vinegar Syndrome announced the release of a 4K UHD Blu-ray edition with newly commissioned bonus materials.

== Reception ==
=== Box office ===
During its opening week of August 27–September 1, 1971 at New York City's Criterion Theatre, the film grossed a total of $47,651 in ticket sales.

=== Critical reception ===
Contemporary critical reviews of the film were mixed: upon its release, Stanley Kanfer of Time gave the film a middling review, praising Lampert's performance but dismissing the rest of the cast's, adding that "after the first reel, the vampires seem to have lost their bite." Roger Greenspun of The New York Times also praised Lampert's performance and lauded the film, calling it a "thinking man's vampire movie, probably a secret dream for at least half the world's young filmmakers." Kevin Thomas of the Los Angeles Times noted the "strong sense of atmosphere" in the film, in addition to the four lead performances, whom he deemed "likable, believable people," but conceded that "There's no getting around the movie's poorly resolved script." Perry Stewart of the Fort Worth Star-Telegram found the film ineffective in terms of its horror elements, but described the acting as "first-rate."

Critics had mixed responses to the film's ambiguous plot: Jack Meredith of the Windsor Star described it as a "far-out bit of froth" that "nevertheless packs continuing suspense and a what's-going-to-happen-next element that never lets down through about 1½ hours of sustained action." Writing for the Edmonton Journal, Barry Westgate was critical of the film, noting: "Even contrived cinema has to have its share of rhyme or reason, and this effort by John Hancock doesn't have so much as a touch of either." Ann Guarino of the New York Daily News was ambivalent about the film's ambiguous narrative, writing that it "presents the problem and leaves you to solve it... The film may not take the curl out of your hair, but it will hold your interest even if the title will throw you off—there actually is no plot to scare Jessica." She also praised the performances of Lampert and Costello, as well as those of Heyman and O'Connor, but noted of the latter that their "characters are not well developed by the script." Jack Zink, critic for the Fort Lauderdale News, wrote favorably of the screenplay's ambiguity and gothic tone, noting that "[your] nerves get so jangled that you don't worry about the little things in Let's Scare Jessica to Death which don't seem to belong." The Columbia Daily Tribune's Kerry Kohring also lauded the script's "dubious line between illusion and reality," and deemed it "an extremely creepy film."

The San Francisco Examiner's Stanley Eichelbaum highlighted deficiencies in the screenplay, noting that the film "seems improvised and nothing could be worse for this kind of structured suspense thriller. Hancock's direction is ridiculously disjointed and inconsistent." This sentiment was echoed by Kevin Kelly of The Boston Globe, who felt the film contained so many idiosyncrasies that "nothing rings true." John Simon described Let's Scare Jessica to Death as "a mess."

The Pittsburgh Post-Gazette's Donald Miller wrote that "after the first ten minutes... I thought director John Hancock... was onto something—if not a new genre, then perhaps something as arresting as the Cat People," but felt that it devolved into a "routine vampire romp," though he did praise the cinematography and visuals. Ted Mahar of The Oregonian similarly praised the cinematography and use of locations, as well as Lampert's lead performance, but ultimately felt that the screenplay "never develops."

=== Modern assessment and legacy ===
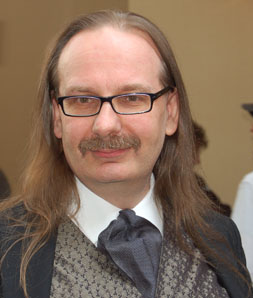
British film scholar Kim Newman regards Let's Scare Jessica to Death as one of the ten best films ever made

On the review aggregator website Rotten Tomatoes, 50% of 14 critics' reviews are positive, with an average rating of 5.5/10. Metacritic, which uses a weighted average, assigned the film a score of 58 out of 100, based on 9 critics, indicating "mixed or average" reviews. Let's Scare Jessica to Death has been named one of the scariest films of all time by several critical publications: in 2006, the Chicago Film Critics Association pronounced Let's Scare Jessica to Death the 87th scariest film ever made. In a 2012 poll for Sight & Sound, Let's Scare Jessica to Death was ranked the 849th greatest film of all time. Beginning with its late-night television broadcasts throughout the 1970s and 1980s, the film garnered a cult following.

According to Steve Senski of Trailers from Hell, Twilight Zone creator Rod Serling called it "one of the most frightening films he'd ever seen in his life." Film scholar Kim Newman, as well as fiction writers Charles L. Grant and Stephen King, are among those who have named it one of their favorite horror films. In 2022, Newman ranked it as one of the ten greatest films ever made. Newman specifically praised Lampert's performance, which he ranks as equal to those of Gena Rowlands in A Woman Under the Influence (1974), Carrie Snodgress in Diary of a Mad Housewife (1970), Shirley Knight in The Rain People (1969), and Susannah York in Images (1972), all "portrait[s] of a woman in distress." Newman also considers the film to be "unconstrained by genre, made by people who wanted to do something scary but for whom that wasn't the limit of their ambitions."

Sara Century, writing for Syfy, noted the significance of the film: "While the response is entirely subjective and it isn't a film for everyone, Jessica did in many ways serve as a forerunner for what would come later, as filmmakers like David Lynch would delve into dreamscapes that refused to sustain themselves explicitly in cohesive narratives. As with many movies, the tone of Jessica is what matters, and that is indeed where it succeeds." In the early 2010s, London's Time Out conducted a poll with several authors, directors, actors and critics who have worked within the horror genre to vote for their top horror films, who ranked the film number 86 in a list of 100 films.

Film scholar John Stanley gave the film a favorable review in his 1995 book, writing: "Director John Hancock is to be congratulated for a multi-layered horror film with frightening visuals. There isn't much logic to the story, yet the overall effect is unsettling... the film has a dream-like quality." Rober Firsching, reviewing the film for AllMovie, similarly deemed it an "eerie low-budget chiller." Film scholar Gary A. Smith described Lampert's performance as Jessica as being "laid back to the point of somnambulism. Lampert gives a performance so overwrought that it has to rank as one of the most eccentric ever captured on film."

In 2006, Eric Henderson of Slant Magazine gave the film an unfavorable review, writing: "A lesbian panic melodrama in New England gothic drag, the only things separating Let's Scare Jessica to Death from its cinematic descendants are its narrative incoherence, its lack of a directorial presence (especially surprising considering the colloquial implications of the director's name), [and] its drab, douche commercial mise-en-scène." Author and independent filmmaker John Kenneth Muir gave the film 3 1/2 out of 4 stars, praising the film's cinematography, "unsettling" mood, and its ability to generate a sense of unease, calling it "very disturbing" and noting its "lovely and poetic" visuals.

In her 2012 book House of Psychotic Women, author Kier-La Janisse called the film "one of the most subtle masterpieces of '70s genre cinema", adding that Lampert was "incredible in her portrayal of Jessica's struggle to hold herself together." In his 2014 Movie Guide, film critic Leonard Maltin awarded the film 2 1/2 out of a possible 4 stars, calling it "creepy."

== Sources ==
- Doyle, Michael (December 2016). "The Woman in the Water". Rue Morgue. No. 173. pp. 16–22. ISSN 1481-1103.
- Doyle, Michael (2018). Hancock on Hancock. Albany, Georgia: BearManor Media. ISBN 978-1-62933-243-7.
- Janisse, Kier-La (2012). House of Psychotic Women: An Autobiographical Topography of Female Neurosis in Horror and Exploitation Films. FAB Press. ISBN 978-1-903-25469-1. OCLC 913134518.
- Kay, Glenn (2008). Zombie Movies: The Ultimate Guide. Chicago, Illinois: Chicago Review Press. ISBN 978-1-556-52770-8.
- Konow, David (March 2005). "Let's Scare Audiences to Death". Fangoria. No. 241. pp. 50–54. ISSN 0164-2111.
- Maltin, Leonard (2013). Leonard Maltin's 2014 Movie Guide. New York: Penguin Books. ISBN 978-0-451-41810-4.
- Muir, John Kenneth (2007). Horror Films of the 1970s. Vol. 1. Jefferson, North Carolina: McFarland & Company. ISBN 978-0-786-43104-5.
- Ocker, J. W. (2010). The New England Grimpendium. Woodstock, Vermont: Countrymen Press. ISBN 978-0-881-50919-9.
- Simon, John (1982). Reverse Angle: A Decade of American Film. New York City, New York: Crown Publishers Inc. ISBN 978-0-517-54471-6.
- Smith, Gary A. (2017). Vampire Films of the 1970s: Dracula to Blacula and Every Fang Between. Jefferson, North Carolina: McFarland & Company. ISBN 978-0-786-49779-9.
- Stanley, John (1995). John Stanley's Creature Features Strikes Again Movie Guide. Pacifica, California: Creatures at Large. ISBN 978-0-940-06409-6.
- Weiner, David J. (1991). Videohound's Golden Movie Retriever, 1992. Detroit, Michigan: Visible Ink Press. ISBN 978-0-810-39404-9.
- West, Nancy (2013). "On Celluloid Carmillas". Carmilla: A Critical Edition. Syracuse, New York: Syracuse University Press. ISBN 978-0-815-63311-2.
