= Kevin O'Connor (actor, born 1935) =

American actor (1935–1991)

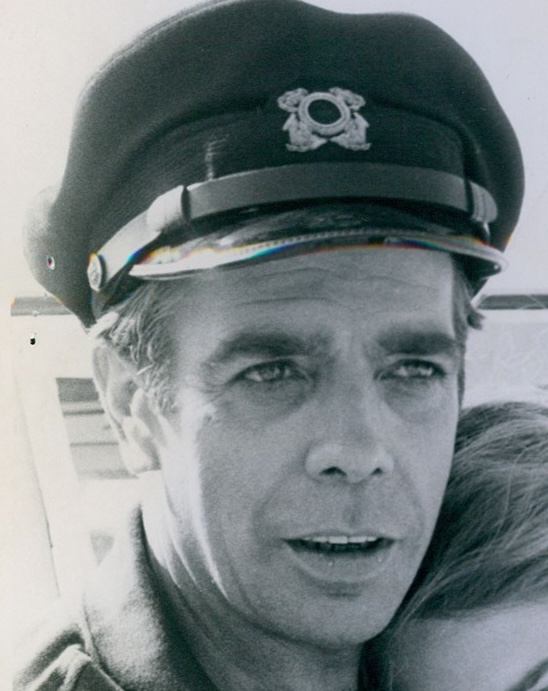
- O'Connor in Bogart (1980)
- Born: May 7, 1935; Honolulu, Hawaii Territory, U.S.
- Died: June 22, 1991 (aged 56); New York City, New York, U.S.
- Education: San Francisco State University
- Occupations: Actor; drama teacher
- Years active: 1967–1991

John Kevin O'Connor (May 7, 1935 – June 22, 1991) was an American film, stage, and television actor. He is best known for his roles in Let's Scare Jessica to Death (1971), Bogie (1980), and The Brink's Job (1978). He also acted extensively on stage, winning two Drama Desk Awards and an Obie Award.

== Early life ==
O'Connor was born John Kevin O'Connor on May 7, 1935, in Honolulu, Hawaii. He was of English and Irish descent. O'Connor was raised in Honolulu, graduating from Roosevelt High School in 1953.

He attended the College of San Mateo in California before graduating with a degree in drama from San Francisco State University.

== Career ==
O'Connor moved to New York City to pursue an acting career, where he began working as a stage actor and joined the experimental theater group, La MaMa. He portrayed the titular character in a New York production of Tom Paine in 1965, which later toured in Europe in 1966 at Edinburgh's Church Hill Theatre, and in London at the Vaudeville Theatre in the West End.

His film roles includeLet's Scare Jessica to Death (1971) and The Brink's Job (1978). O'Connor also appeared on television in Hawaii Five-O, in October 1969 as security guard Jim Crawford in The Doctors and Tales from the Darkside as well as several television movies. He won the Drama Desk Award for Outstanding Actor in a Play for his performance in The Contractor in 1973.

O'Connor portrayed Humphrey Bogart in the 1980 biographical television film Bogie about Humphrey Bogart. In 1982, he appeared in a stage production of Inserts, based on the film of the same title. He subsequently appeared in two films directed by Larry Cohen: Special Effects (1984) and It's Alive 3: Island of the Alive (1987).

In his later life, O'Connor taught drama at Hunter College, New York University, and St. Francis College. In 1991, O'Connor was working on a book about the plays of Sam Shepard.

== Death ==
O'Connor died of cancer New York University Medical Center 56 on June 22, 1991. He was a resident of the Hotel Chelsea at the time of his death.

== Filmography ==
| Year | Title | Role | Notes | Ref. |
|---|---|---|---|---|
| 1969 | Coming Apart | Armand | | |
| 1969 | Let's Scare Jessica to Death | Woody | | |
| 1971 | Welcome to the Club | Harrison W. Morve | | |
| 1974 | The Contractor | Glendenning | Television film | |
| 1975 | The Blazer Girls | Kayo | | |
| 1976 | The Passover Plot | Irijah | | |
| 1978 | The Brink's Job | Stanley Gusciora | | |
| 1980 | Bogie | Humphrey Bogart | Television film | |
| 1984 | Perfect Strangers | Cop | | |
| 1984 | Special Effects | Dt. Lt. Philip DelRoy | | |
| 1988 | It's Alive III: Island of the Alive | Cab Driver | | |
| 1988 | Sam Found Out: A Triply Play | Detective | Television film | |

== Selected stage credits ==
| Year | Title | Role | Location(s) | Ref. |
|---|---|---|---|---|
| 1965–1966 | Tom Paine | Thomas Paine | Church Hill Theatre; Vaudeville Theatre | |
| 1970 | Gloria and Esperanza | Julius Esperanza | ANTA Playhouse | |
| 1970 | Dear Janet Rosenberg, Dear Mr. Kooning | Alec Kooning | Gramercy Theatre | |
| 1970 | Jakey Fat Boy | Jakey | Gramercy Theatre | |
| 1974 | The Contractor | Glendenning | Chelsea Annex | |
| 1979 | Devour the Snow | Fallon | John Golden Theatre | |
| 1982 | Inserts | Boy Wonder | Actors and Directors Theatre | |

== Accolades ==
| Associationn | Year | Award | Nominated work | Result | Ref. |
|---|---|---|---|---|---|
| Drama Desk Awards | 1966 | Vernon Rice Award | Six from LaMaMa | Won | |
| Drama Desk Awards | 1974 | Outstanding Actor in a Play | The Contractor | Won | |
| Obie Awards | 1982 | Best Performance | Chucky's Hunch; Birdbath; Crossing the Crab Nebula | Won | |
