= Lee Kalcheim =

American screenwriter (born 1938)

- Born: June 27, 1938 (age 87); Philadelphia, Pennsylvania, U.S.
- Occupations: TV and film screenwriter
- Years active: 1965-present
- Known for: Writing work for various TV shows and films
- Awards: Primetime Emmy Award for his writing work for the episode "The Bunkers And The Swingers" in Season 3 of All in the Family
- Website: http://www.leekalcheim.com

Lee Kalcheim (June 27, 1938 in Philadelphia, Pennsylvania) is an American screenwriter.

== Television ==
Kalcheim has written numerous television shows including episodes for The Paper Chase (1985); All in the Family (1971–72; Emmy 1973); N.Y.P.D. (1967–69); The Alfred Hitchcock Hour (1965); and the ABC After School Special: "The Bridge of Adam Rush" (1974). He was also a creator for the sitcom Something Wilder, which was originally inspired by his own experiences as a father.

== Filmography ==
Film name	Year	Description
Is This Trip Really Necessary?	1970	A mad filmmaker kills an actress in his torture chamber's iron maiden.
Let's Scare Jessica to Death	1971	A recently institutionalized woman has bizarre experiences after moving into a supposedly haunted country farmhouse and fears she may be losing her sanity once again.
The Comedy Company	1978	
Marriage is Alive and Well	1980	A photographer who specializes in weddings and who, according to others, has the perfect marriage. However, he and his wife are at a crossroad and have decided to separate. While he and his wife bicker and she prepares to leave, he reminisces about people whom he has photographed who have had unusual relationships.

== Plays ==
Play name	First produced	First published	Description and/or Reference
Defiled	Unknown	Unknown	When a technophobic librarian threatens to detonate the library if his card catalog is taken away, the police must negotiate with him.
An Audible Sigh	1968	Unknown	
Match Play	1969	1969	A spoiled young man takes on a girl, his father, and the Army to get what he wants and doesn't need.
Hurry, Harry	1972	1972	A rich boy struggles to find happiness.
Class of '63	1973	1973	A jealous husband uses a college reunion to take revenge on his wife's former lover, who he is convinced is still having an affair with her.
The Boy Who Came to Leave	1973	1973	Two young men with opposite personalities share a loft apartment.
Win With Wheeler	1975	1984	
The Prague Spring	1977	1977	The Czech leader Alexander Dubcek believes he can reform the Communist regime.
Winning Isn't Everything	1978	1978	An ex-astronaut makes his way into Senate under the tutelage of a hard-driving campaign manager.
Breakfast with Les and Bess	1983	1984	
Friends	Unknown	1984	
Moving	1991	Unknown	The one steady thing in Megan and Diana's lives, in the twelve years this play spans, is the friendship they share. As their priorities change over the years, they must figure out what they want out of life before it is too late.
