= Composition for Victory Day =

- DVD Cover
- Directed by: Sergei Ursuliak
- Written by: Gennady Ostrovsky; Alexey Zernov
- Produced by: Yevgeny Ulyushkin
- Starring: Oleg Yefremov; Vyacheslav Tikhonov; Mikhail Ulyanov
- Cinematography: Mikhail Suslov
- Edited by: Olga Grinshpun
- Music by: Mikael Tariverdiev; Sergey Rudnitsky
- Production company: Gorky Film Studio
- Release date: 1998
- Running time: 114 min
- Country: Russia
- Language: Russian

Composition for Victory Day (Russian: Сочинение ко Дню Победы, romanized: Sochinenie ko Dnyu Pobedy) is a Russian film from 1998. The director is Sergei Ursuliak. It's Oleg Yefremov's last role.

== Plot ==
They had not seen for twenty-five years the crew of heroic fighters, three front-line friends. Life they have developed in different ways: one a convinced Communist, not missing a single red rally, the other successful vice-chairman of the veterans non-poor fund, the third an emigrant, who lost his sight in old age and came home to participate in the Victory Parade.

They argue passionately with each other about the reasons for the ills and misfortunes of today. But when one of them gets into trouble, his friends are ready to do anything to save his comrade.

== Cast ==
- Oleg Yefremov as Dmitry Kilovatov
- Vyacheslav Tikhonov as Lev Morgulis
- Mikhail Ulyanov as Ivan Dyakov
- Zinaida Sharko as Nina
- Vladimir Kashpur as Stepanyuk
- Vladimir Mashkov as Sasha, Morgulis' s son
- Sergei Makovetsky as investigator Chechevikin
- Vladimir Ilyin as Zvyagin
- Vladimir Menshov as the general
- Sergei Nikonenko as Nechyporenko, head of the airport
- Gennady Nazarov as Vova
- Sergey Stepanchenko as Dyakov's neighbor
- Sergey Batalov as the police officer
- Fyodor Dobronravov as Slava
- Vadim Zakharchenko as the veteran
- Roman Madyanov as "Chubais"
- Konstantin Lavronenko as Kostya
- Lyubov Sokolova as Anya
- Maksim Vitorgan as the bandit

== Awards and nominations ==
- Nika Award: Zinaida Sharko (Best Supporting Actor or Actress) – nom
- Russian Guild of Film Critics: Mikhail Ulyanov (Best Actor), Mikael Tariverdiev (Best Score) – nom
- Kinotavr: Sergei Ursuliak (Grand Prize) – nom
