= Man on a Swing =

1974 film by Frank Perry

- Theatrical release poster
- Directed by: Frank Perry
- Screenplay by: David Zelag Goodman
- Based on: The Girl on the Volkswagen Floor by William Arthur Clark
- Produced by: Howard B. Jaffe
- Starring: Cliff Robertson; Joel Grey; Dorothy Tristan
- Cinematography: Adam Holender
- Edited by: Sidney Katz
- Music by: Lalo Schifrin
- Production company: Jaffilms Inc.
- Distributed by: Paramount Pictures
- Release date: February 27, 1974
- Running time: 110 minutes
- Country: United States
- Language: English

Man on a Swing is a 1974 American thriller film directed by Frank Perry and written by David Zelag Goodman. The film stars Cliff Robertson, Joel Grey, Dorothy Tristan, Elizabeth Wilson and George Voskovec and was released on February 27, 1974, by Paramount Pictures. The film is loosely drawn from a true-life murder investigation and based on the non-fiction book The Girl on the Volkswagen Floor (1971) by journalist William Arthur Clark.

== Plot ==
Police detective Lee Tucker is investigating the murder of a woman named Maggie Dawson. He has little evidence until factory worker Franklin Wills approaches him, identifying himself as a clairvoyant. Wills goes into trances during which he says that he can see the murder taking place. Tucker wonders whether Wills is truly clairvoyant or has an ulterior motive.

== Cast ==
- Cliff Robertson as Lee Tucker
- Joel Grey as Franklin Wills
- Dorothy Tristan as Janet Tucker
- Elizabeth Wilson as Dr. Anna Willson
- George Voskovec as Dr. Nicholas Holnar
- Ron Weyand as Dr. Philip Fusco
- Peter Masterson as Willie Younger
- Lane Smith as Ted Ronan
- Joe Ponazecki as Dan Lloyd
- Christopher Allport as Richie Tom Keating
- Patricia Hawkins as Diana Spenser
- Richard Venture as Man in Motel
- Dianne Hull as Maggie Dawson
- Gil Gerard as Donald Forbes
- Robert Dryden as Mr. Dawson
- Alice Drummond as Mrs. Dawson
- Richard McKenzie as Sam Gallagher
- Brendan Fay as Father Connally
- Clarice Blackburn as Mrs. Brennan
- Nicholas Pryor as Paul Kearney
- Josef Sommer as Pete Russell
- Shawn Campbell as Steve Barron
- Ben Slack as Ronnie
- Clarence Felder as Coach
- Penelope Milford as Evelyn Moore
- Richard Venture as Man in Hotel
- Bruce French as Check-Out Man
- Loretta Fury as Mrs. Segretta
- Roy Mason as Plant Manager
- James Galvin as Man in Plant

== See also ==
- List of American films of 1974
