= Bruce French (actor) =

American actor (1945–2025)

- Born: July 4, 1945; Reinbeck, Iowa, U.S.
- Died: February 7, 2025 (aged 79); Los Angeles, California, U.S.
- Occupation: Actor
- Years active: 1974–2012
- Spouse: Eileen Barnett (m. 1991)

Bruce French (July 4, 1945 – February 7, 2025) was an American actor who acted for more than 30 years.

== Life and career ==
French was born in Reinbeck, Iowa, on July 4, 1945. He attended the University of Iowa and majored in speech and theatre. He was married to actress and singer Eileen Barnett.

He is best known for his recurring role as Father Lonigan on the NBC daytime drama Passions, appearing in over four hundred episodes between 1999 and 2008. Lonigan, a blind priest who had an uncanny knack for perceiving evil, was one of French's more than 150 credited appearances on television and in film. He played priests and other men of faith with such frequency that he brought a clerical collar to auditions.

French also played Jim Burns, the wealthy neighbor of the Malloy/"Rich" family, on The Riches; Jim's wife, Nina, is played by Margo Martindale. He was also noted for having portrayed a number of different characters across the Star Trek universe, including the empath adjutant to Jean Simmons in "The Drumhead", cited as one of the best episodes in the franchise. He is also one of the few actors to appear in both Star Trek and Star Wars, having contributed his voice to Star Wars: The Original Radio Drama in 1981.

His film roles include that of a checkout man in Frank Perry's Man on a Swing. He also had a brief role as a reporter in Jurassic Park III and a pathologist in Fletch.

French died from complications of Alzheimer's disease in Los Angeles, on February 7, 2025, at the age of 79.

== Awards and nominations ==
Ovation Awards

- 2010: Won the award for Lead Actor in a Play for the role of Andrew Crocker-Harris in the Pacific Resident Theatre production of "The Browning Version"

== Filmography ==
- Man on a Swing (1974) .... Check-Out Man
- Pipe Dreams (1976) .... The Duke
- Rollercoaster (1977) .... Bomb Squad #2
- Coming Home (1978) .... Dr. Lincoln
- Bloodbrothers (1978) .... Paulie
- First Family (1980) .... White House Tour Guide
- Airplane II: The Sequel (1982) .... Officer #2
- Mr. Mom (1983) .... Douglass
- Sweetwater (1983) .... Driver
- Christine (1983) .... Mr. Smith
- Fletch (1985) .... Dr. Holmes
- Jagged Edge (1985) .... Richard Duffin
- Murphy's Romance (1985) .... Rex Boyd
- Wildcats (1986) .... Mayhew
- Legal Eagles (1986) .... Reporter
- Surrender (1987) .... Dream Lawyer
- Black Eagle (1988) .... Father Joseph Bedelia
- Martians Go Home (1989) .... Elgins
- Caretaker (Star Trek: Voyager) (1995) .... Ocampa Doctor
- Star Trek: Insurrection (1998) .... Son'a Officer #1
- Jurassic Park III (2001) .... Science Reporter
- Sorority Boys (2002) .... Dean Blevins
- The West Wing (2002) .... Bill Stark
- Enough (2002) .... Homeowner
- Mr. Deeds (2002) .... Helicopter Pilot
- Sexual Life (2004) .... Priest
- Thank You for Smoking (2005) .... Gentleman #2
- Mission: Impossible III (2006) .... Minister
- Dark and Stormy Night (2009) .... Jeens
- Beginners (2010) .... Dr. Wright
- Beautiful Boy (2010) .... Harry
