= Mariclare Costello =

American actress (1936–2026)

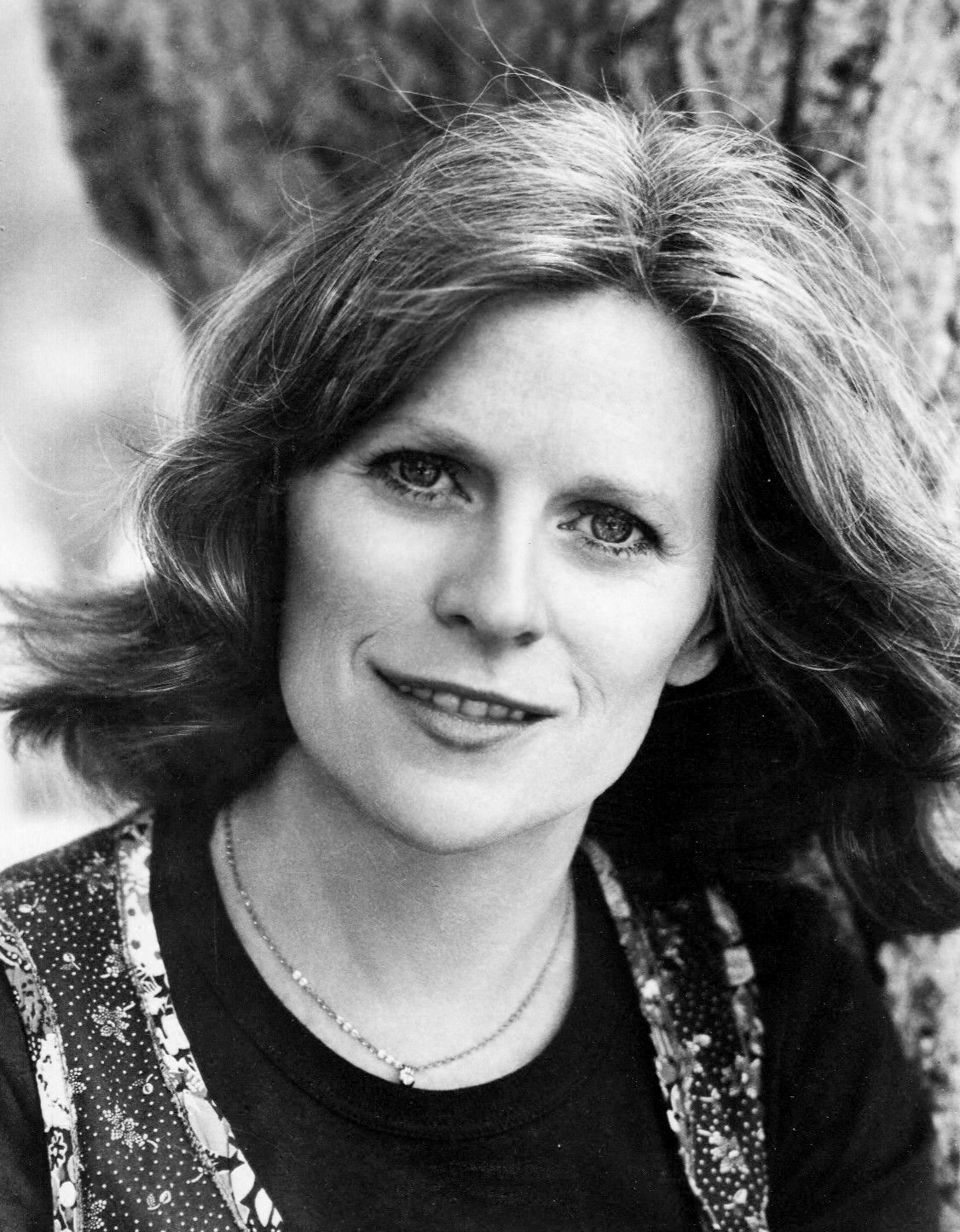
- Costello in 1977
- Born: February 3, 1936; Peoria, Illinois, U.S.
- Died: April 17, 2026 (aged 90); Brooklyn, New York, U.S.
- Occupation: Actress
- Years active: 1967–2002
- Spouse: Allan Arbus (m. 1977; died 2013)
- Children: 1

Mariclare Catherine Costello (February 3, 1936 – April 17, 2026) was an American actress. She was a lifetime member of The Actors Studio. Costello's most notable role was that of Rosemary Hunter Fordwick on the television series The Waltons, from 1972 to 1977. In 1977, after her role on The Waltons, she played matriarch Maggie Fitzpatrick on the short-lived drama show The Fitzpatricks.

== Early years ==
Costello was born in Peoria, Illinois, on February 3, 1936, the daughter of Dallas and Margaret Costello. She was named outstanding Catholic actress of the year while she was an undergraduate at Clarke College. She also was awarded during her years in Catholic University's Graduate School of Drama. Her Clarke education included a semester at the University of Vienna in addition to tours of European countries.

== Career ==
Costello appeared in the off-Broadway play The Hostage. Her Broadway credits included After The Fall (1964), But For Whom Charlie (1964), The Changeling (1964), Tartuffe (1965), Danton's Death (1965), The Country Wife (1965), Lovers and Other Strangers (1968), A Patriot for Me (1969), and Harvey (1970).

She portrayed a hippie-vampire in the 1971 cult horror film Let's Scare Jessica to Death.

After her acting career, she was an acting professor at Loyola Marymount University in Los Angeles.

== Personal life and death ==
Costello was married to actor Allan Arbus until his death in 2013. The couple had one child. She died in Brooklyn, New York on April 17, 2026, at the age of 90.

== Filmography ==
| Year | Title | Role | Notes |
|---|---|---|---|
| 1967 | The Tiger Makes Out | Rosi | |
| 1969 | N.Y.P.D. | Eloise Hendrix | S2.E16 - "The Attacker" |
| 1970 | Pound | Honky Killer's Wife | |
| 1970 | Storefront Lawyers | Nancy Collins | S1.E3 - "Murph Collins vs. Tomorrow" |
| 1971 | Let's Scare Jessica to Death | Emily/Abigail | |
| 1972 | Ironside | Mary Ellen Wells | S6.E2 - "The Savage Sentry" |
| 1972–77 | The Waltons | Rosemary Hunter/Fordwick | 15 episodes |
| 1974 | Kojak | Diane Gordon | S1.E13 - "Death Is Not a Passing Grade" |
| 1974 | After the Fall | Louise | TV film based on Arthur Miller's play by the same name |
| 1974 | The Execution of Private Slovik | Private Slovik's wife Antoinette | NBC TV film |
| 1974 | The Gun | Beryl Strauss | ABC Movie of the Week |
| 1975 | Barnaby Jones | Ruth Granger | S3.E21 - "The Deadlier Species" |
| 1975 | Harry O | Emily Weston | S1.E15 - "For the Love of Money" |
| 1977 | This Is the Life | Ann | Episode: "Stranger at the Door" |
| 1977 | Raid on Entebbe | Gabrielle Krieger | |
| 1977–78 | The Fitzpatricks | Maggie Fitzpatrick | 13 episodes - regular cast |
| 1979 | The Incredible Hulk | Kay Wallace | S2.E18 - "No Escape" |
| 1979–81 | Lou Grant | Maxine Kintner/Louise Larsen | 2 episodes |
| 1980 | Ordinary People | Audrey Butler | |
| 1980 | Little House on the Prairie (1974 TV series) | Helen Crane | |
| 1981 | Ragtime | Emma Goldman | (workprint edit only) |
| 1981 | Coward of the County | Emma | Television Movie |
| 1982 | Hart to Hart | Anita Boyer | S3.E18 - "Deep in the Hart of Dixieland" |
| 1982 | Fame | Mrs. Mendenhall | S3.E9 - "Secrets" |
| 1983 | Nightmares | Adele Cooney | (segment "The Bishop of Battle") |
| 1984 | The Adventures of Buckaroo Banzai Across the 8th Dimension | Senator Cunningham | |
| 1984 | Victims for Victims: The Theresa Saldana Story | Jane Bladow | NBC TV film |
| 1985 | Heart of a Champion: The Ray Mancini Story | Ellen Mancini | CBS TV film |
| 1986 | Murder, She Wrote | Cassie Latham Burns | S2.E15 - "Powder Keg" |
| 1990 | In the Heat of the Night | Darlene | S3.E14 - "December Days" |
| 1990 | Santa Barbara | Sister Lillian | 2 episodes |
| 1993 | Indecent Proposal | David's Mother | |
| 1997 | High Tide | | S3.E21 - "Ghost Story" |
| 1998 | Chicago Hope | Mother Mary Catherine | S4.E13 - "Memento Mori" |
| 1999 | Judging Amy | Dr. Singer | S1.E7 - "An Impartial Bias" |
| 2002 | Providence | Helen Norris | S4.E21 - "Smoke and Mirrors" |
| 2011 | Assisted Loving (video short) | Pearl | |
