= 100 Days Before the Command =

- DVD cover
- Directed by: Hussein Erkenov
- Written by: Vladimir Kholodov; Yuri Polyakov
- Produced by: Aleksandr Zosimenko
- Starring: Vladimir Zamansky; Armen Dzhigarkhanyan; Oleg Vasilkov; Roman Grekov; Valeri Troshin; Aleksandr Chislov; Mikhail Solomatin
- Cinematography: Vladislav Menshikov
- Edited by: Galina Dmitriyeva; Vladimir Portnov
- Production company: Gorky Film Studio
- Distributed by: Peccadillo Pictures
- Release date: 1990
- Running time: 67 minutes
- Country: Soviet Union
- Language: Russian

100 Days Before the Command (Russian: Сто дней до приказа, translit. Sto dney do prikaza) is a 1990 Soviet drama film directed by Hussein Erkenov, inspired by the eponymous novel written by Yuri Polyakov.

In order to get Gorki Studios to provide funding for the film, Erkenov and writers Yuri Polyakov and Vladimir Golodov provided the studio with two fake scripts in addition to the real one. The Soviet government censored the film and banned its export. It was not screened outside of the country until the Berlin International Film Festival in 1994 after Erkenov founded his own sales company.

== Synopsis ==
The film exposes the humiliations and cruelties inflicted on young conscripts in the Soviet Red Army by their military superiors at a training camp in Central Russia. There are several detailed accounts of disturbing incidents; including a superior officer urinating on a sleeping conscript, another dumps a bowl of hot soup on a young soldier at mess. The film has no narrative structure and rather than telling a story uses vignettes with minimal dialogue to expose the conditions in which Soviet army recruits lived. The film explores themes of homoeroticism.

== Cast ==
- Vladimir Zamansky as The Unknown Man
- Armen Dzhigarkhanyan as Brigade Commander
- Oleg Vasilkov as Elin
- Roman Grekov as Zub
- Valeriy Troshin as Kudrin
- Aleksandr Chislov as Zyrin
- Mikhail Solomatin as Belikov
- Sergey Romantsov as Titarenko
- Sergey Bystritsky as Senior Lieutenant
- Elena Kondulainen as Death
- Oleg Khusainov as Angel
- Sergey Semyonov as Captain
- Maria Politseymako as woman in the field
- Vadim Piyankov as lance-corporal

== Reception ==
Louis Menashe wrote in Cinéaste that "the harshness of Soviet basic training was legendary, outstripping other nations in that regard." Director Erkenov conveys those atrocities "mostly through a moody, elliptical, and often incomprehensibly enigmatic style; 100 Days is uneven; by turns haunting and edgy, and irritatingly obtuse, but powerful overall." Julian Graffy of Sight and Sound thought "the poetry of the film has a terrible bleakness; at its end there is no explanation, no atonement, not even any particular interest in the chain of death; instead, in a world drained of colour, light, air even, another dread day dawns."

Derek Malcom of The Guardian observed that while the film is "clearly anti-military", it is more focused on "life's victims, and Erkenov's images bring them to life with stark elegance." Malcom points out that "there is very little screenplay and no plot to speak of; the film merely exists on the edge of a dark, humiliating and brutal abyss." He also highlighted that there are "copious homoerotic undertones", and although the movie "clearly has power and talent; what it lacks in the end is the drama of properly coherent story-telling."

The Observer's film critic Philip French stated it is a "homoerotic film with a succession of often striking, dreamlike images, most frequently of naked soldiers in showers, steam baths, barrack-rooms and prison cells; images of humiliation and despair recur, but there is no coherent narrative; it looks rather like a funny thing that happened to Derek Jarman on the way to the Gulag." Eric Hansen wrote in Variety Magazine that "though technically poor and dramatically erratic, this metaphoric, slightly surrealistic look at life in the Russian military packs a punch." Overall, he concludes that "Erkenov succeeds in invoking a heady atmosphere and a meaty, homoerotic suggestiveness that lend a strange attraction to his characters piteous roads to self-destruction."

== See also ==
- List of Russian films
- List of LGBTQ-related films
