= No Place to Hide (1973 film) =

- Directed by: Robert Allen Schnitzer
- Written by: Larry Beinhart; Louis Pastore; Robert Allen Schnitzer
- Produced by: David Appleton; Rick Blumenthal; Robert Allen Schnitzer
- Starring: Sylvester Stallone; Antony Page; Rebecca Grimes; Roy White; Vickie Lancaster; Dennis Tate; Barbara Lee Govan
- Cinematography: Marty Knopf; Misha Suslov
- Edited by: LaReine Johnston
- Music by: Joseph Delacorte
- Distributed by: Galaxy Films
- Release dates: September 12, 1973 (Atlanta Film Festival); September 12, 1974 (United States)
- Running time: 80 minutes
- Country: United States
- Language: English

No Place to Hide is a 1973 American thriller film directed by Robert Allen Schnitzer and starring Sylvester Stallone. The film is about New York in the late 1960s, a politically motivated group of students plans bombings of company offices who do business with dictators in Central American countries, but when they contact a known terrorist and bombing specialist, the FBI gets involved.

The film was re-cut and re-released as Rebel with greater emphasis on Stallone's character after he rose to fame. In 1990, the film was again re-edited, this time as a comedy, and released under the title A Man Called... Rainbo.

In 2025, director Robert Allen Schnitzer gave the film a 4K remaster using the title Rebel: Director's Cut, which toured across the United States.

== Plot ==
In October 1969, anti-war activist Jerry Savage accepts a ride from a group of hippies, on their way to New York City to sell their wares, during the journey Jerry takes an instant liking to Laurie, a sweet-natured girl who makes jewelry.

Meanwhile, at a New York City dance studio, Estelle Ferguson receives a phone call, informing her that “the merchandise has arrived,” which she collects from a chemical company later that evening. The next day, Jerry meets his friend, Tommy Trafler, at a park. They arrange to discuss their business at Tommy's office in the warehouse district. Later, Estelle and taxi driver Ray Brown arrive at Tommy's office, along with Jerry. Ray criticizes Estelle for storing dynamite in her car and demands an explanation for the absence of Marlena St. James, but Tommy assures Ray that Marlena can be trusted. Jerry reluctantly accepts an invitation to stay with Estelle.

The following day, Jerry and Estelle pose as tourists while they study the layout of the headquarters of Morris and Ray Metals, a cookware company that also builds personal detention cells called “tiger cages,” used to imprison, bury and drown enemy combatants in Vietnam. At the New York offices of the Federal Bureau of Investigation (FBI), agents James Henderson and Chuck Bradley view film footage of buildings destroyed by Marlena, who is known as “Miss M” and “The Black Bomber.” Her most recent target was a university building where germ warfare research was being conducted. However, none of her bombings resulted in death or injury. Aware that Marlena is in New York City, the FBI has acquired a civilian infiltrator assigned to entrap her. The infiltrator is someone known and trusted among the radical group, "The Weathermen," able to report on the activities of cell members without fear of detection. Meanwhile, Tommy, Jerry, Estelle and Ray discuss their target, Morris and Ray Metals. The first step in their operation is to steal copies of the government contracts, which will be released to the press to coincide with the bombing. Tommy argues that this step is unnecessary, but Jerry insists that the public needs to understand why the bombing occurred, otherwise it would be perceived as a wanton act of destruction. On a ferryboat across New York Harbor, Tommy and Marlena rekindle an old romance. She knows that the government is following her, and Tommy offers to abort the mission, but she is dedicated to the cause.

Elsewhere in the city, Jerry finds Laurie at her jewelry stand, and she invites him to spend the weekend at her communal house in the country. There, Jerry and Laurie discuss their approaches to life. She has found peace, and sees her jewelry designs as metaphors for the universe. Jerry believes he can change the world and is determined to bring about peace at any cost. Laurie argues that only God and love can change the world, and she chides Jerry for sounding like a military general. Meanwhile, Marlena constructs her bomb, instructs Estelle how to detonate it, and warns that any sudden shock could cause it to explode prematurely.

In Washington, D. C., journalist Richard Scott enters the office of William Decker, an FBI official in charge of special operations. Scott questions Decker on reports of domestic spying, which implicate Decker's office as the liaison between the FBI and the Central Intelligence Agency (CIA). The official denies the allegations, but explains that his special operations address the problem of the Weathermen, former members of the pacifist Students for a Democratic Society who have formed a network of autonomous cells with no central authority, some of which have resorted to terrorism. When Jerry returns to New York City, his cohorts express resentment about his absence, and Tommy threatens to call off the mission, but Jerry stands by his commitment.

After Tommy assures the group that copies of the contracts have been mailed to every major news outlet, he reviews the details of their mission, as an FBI tape recorder documents the conversation. Afterward, Marlena informs Tommy that she will leave town by morning, but declines to reveal her destination. That night, when Jerry returns to Estelle's apartment, she seduces him by performing a belly dance, and later tells him the story of how, following a miscarriage, she kept the fetus in a milk bottle for several days.

As the sun rises, the cell members embark on their operation. Meanwhile, in Washington, Decker secretly meets with Scott and offers the reporter an exclusive story on the failed bombing of the Morris and Ray building. In return, Scott promises to place a four-week moratorium on any news that might connect the FBI with illicit activities involving the White House or the CIA.

In New York City, Tommy gives Estelle a fake bomb and drives her to her destination. He receives his final payment and a new identity from FBI agent Henderson, then returns to the office to pack his suitcase. When Marlena walks in on Tommy and notices the unmailed contracts, she realizes that he is an informant. She warns Jerry, who escapes in Estelle's car to the commune, unaware that the gift-wrapped package in the back seat is the real bomb. Estelle is trapped inside the Morris and Ray building as FBI agents surround her. They follow her to the roof, where she jumps to her death. Meanwhile, agents storm Tommy's office, but all of the surviving cell members have fled. When Jerry arrives at the commune, the house is empty. While he searches the grounds, Laurie returns and notices the package in the car. She examines it and places it back in the car, but is killed by the subsequent explosion.

== Cast ==
- Sylvester Stallone as Jerry Savage
- Anthony Page as Tommy Trafler
- Rebecca Grimes as Laurie
- Roy White as William Decker
- Vickie Lancaster as Estelle Ferguson
- Dennis Tate as Ray Brown
- Barbara Lee Govan as Marlena St. James

== Production ==
=== Casting ===
Director Robert Allen Schnitzer originally wanted to cast comedian Richard Pryor, who auditioned for the film doing a comedic five minute routine, in the role of Ray, but his crew disagreed that he should cast a comedian in a dramatic role.

=== Filming ===
The movie was filmed in 1972 and premiered at the 1973 Atlanta International Film Festival.
