= Suspended Animation (film) =

2001 film by John D. Hancock

- Directed by: John D. Hancock
- Written by: Dorothy Tristan
- Produced by: John D. Hancock; Robert J. Hiler
- Starring: Alex McArthur
- Cinematography: Misha Suslov
- Edited by: Christopher J. Brown; Dennis M. O'Connor
- Music by: Angelo Badalamenti
- Release date: 2001
- Running time: 114 minutes
- Country: United States
- Language: English

Suspended Animation is a 2001 American thriller film directed and produced by John D. Hancock and starring Alex McArthur.

== Cast ==
- Alex McArthur as Tom Kempton
- Laura Esterman as Vanessa Boulette
- Sage Allen as Ann Boulette
- Maria Cina as Clara Hansen
- Rebecca Harrell as Hilary Kempton
- Fred Meyers as Sandor Hansen

== Reception ==
The film received mixed reviews from critics. On the review aggregator website Rotten Tomatoes, the film has a 52% approval rating, based on 25 reviews. The website's consensus reads, "Suspended Animation offers some gory good fun for genre fans, even if the end results don't quite transcend their cheerfully shallow roots."
