= Yuri Polyakov =

Russian journalist and writer (born 1954)

- Юрий Михайлович Поляков
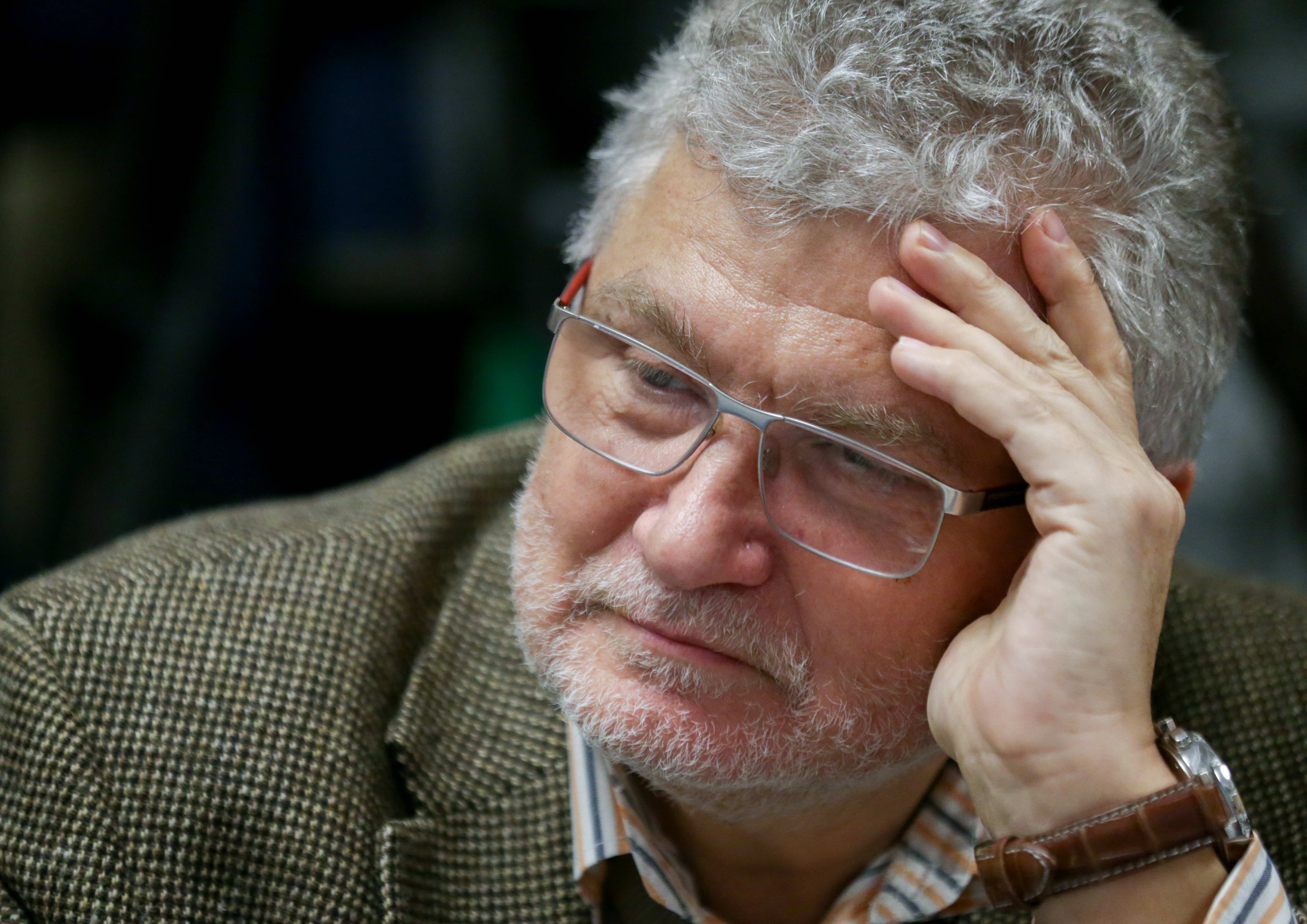
- Polyakov in 2019
- Born: 12 November 1954; Moscow Russian SFSR, Soviet Union
- Education: State University of Education
- Writing career
- Years active: 1974 - present
- Genre: Realism
- Notable awards: Order "For Merit to the Fatherland", Order of Honour, Order of Friendship, Lenin Komsomol Prize

Yuri Mikhailovich Polyakov (Russian: Юрий Михайлович Поляков; born November 12, 1954, Moscow) is a Soviet and Russian writer, poet, playwright, screenwriter and public figure, chairman of the National Association of Playwrights, chairman of the editorial board of the Literaturnaya Gazeta until 2021, editor-in-chief of the Literaturnaya Gazeta (2001–2017).

== Biography ==
He was born on November 12, 1954, in Moscow to a working-class family.

Polyakov's abilities were first identified by his school literature teacher I. A. Osokina. He graduated from the Faculty of Russian Language and Literature of the Krupskaya Moscow Polytechnic Institute, specializing in Russian philology.

In his senior years, he began working as a teacher of Russian language and literature in one of the Moscow schools. After graduating, Polyakov taught for a short time at the School for Working Youth.

In 1976–1977, he served in the Group of Soviet Forces in Germany as a ground loader for a 152-mm self-propelled gun 2S3 "Akatsiya", and then as an editor of the divisional newspaper.

He began writing poetry while still in school, and since 1973 he studied at the Literary Studio at the Moscow City Committee of the Komsomol and the Moscow Writers' Organization. He began his creative path with poetry (seminar of poetess Larisa Vasilyeva). Attended the seminar of the poet Vadim Sikorsky. Polyakov's first poem was published in 1974 in the newspaper Moskovsky Komsomolets, three years later the newspaper published a large selection of poems.

After his military service, he began working as an instructor in the school department of the Bauman District Committee of the Komsomol of the city of Moscow. A year later, he transferred to the newspaper Moskovsky Literator, where he worked until 1986, from a correspondent to becoming editor-in-chief.

Since 1979, he has been collaborating with Literaturnaya Gazeta. In 1979, his first book of poems, Time of Arrival, was published, and in 1981, his second, Conversation with a Friend.

The writer gained wide popularity with his stories “One Hundred Days Before the Order” and “A District-Scale Emergency” — written in the early 1980s, they were published only with the beginning of Perestroika: in January 1985, “Emergency…” was published by the magazine "Yunost", and two years later, "One Hundred Days Before the Order". Soon, the story “A District-Scale Emergency” was adapted for the screen, and then films were released based on other works. Polyakov reflected his philosophical observations on the life of modern society in the books "Demgorodok", “Apothegey”, and “The Kid in Milk”.

One of the writer's works is the adventure love-detective story “The Sky of the Fallen”, about the price that must be paid for the fast success and enrichment of the new masters of life.

The novel "The Mushroom King" (2005) was published in more than 130,000 copies, full of fresh aphorisms and caustic satire on the spiritual-moral and family-sexual turmoil of middle-aged top managers.

In 1981, Polyakov defended his PhD thesis on the topic: "The poet-warrior Georgy Suvorov (On the history of front-line poetry)", candidate of philological sciences. In the same year, he was accepted into the Union of Soviet Writers.

In 1990 the movie 100 Days Before the Command was created based on his book.

In the 2000s, he came out with a series of publicistic essays-pamphlets ("The Silence of the Kremlin" and others) - about the role of literature in the life of post-reform Russian society, writerly conformism and the levers of manipulation of the literary process.

Critics single out Polyakov as a leader in the genre of "grotesque realism", in historical retrospective characteristic of the clash of eras; note the unique and always recognizable language of Polyakov's works, filled with allegories and metaphors, elegant descriptions of eroticism, saturated with subtle irony, imperceptibly turning into lyricism. In the writer's novels and stories, fragments of which are of a journalistic nature, a brightly satirical picture of the life of the Russian creative intelligentsia is given.

In 2012, the collection "Running Away from Love" was published, which included both early and new stories by Polyakov, who continues to study the psychology of a successful Russian intellectual, often a successful entrepreneur, in search of himself and his, in the original expression of the writer, "original" life.

Polyakov's works have been translated into many languages of countries near and far abroad. His prose is included in school and university courses in modern Russian literature.

He hosted his own programs on television: “Family Channel”, "Stihoborie", “Not a Word about Politics” (VGTRK “Russian Universities”), “Let’s Think Together”, “Face the City”, “Data” (MTK, TV Centre), from October 2010 to June 2012 he was the host of the final program “Context” on the Russia-Culture TV channel.

In February 2012, he was included in the list of trusted persons of the candidate for President of Russia Vladimir Putin. Explaining his decision, he noted: “I became Putin’s trusted person, believing that he had begun a revision of Yeltsin’s disastrous policies and should see things through to the end…”.

In December 2015, for his political position and views on the Ukrainian events of 2013–2014, Polyakov was included in the blacklist of Russian citizens who are “persona non grata” on the territory of Ukraine.

The author of a theatrical adaptation based on the book by the Russian Minister of Culture Vladimir Medinsky, "The Wall". The premiere of the play was scheduled for 2017 on the stage of the Gorky Moscow Art Theater.

Since August 2017, Polyakov has ceased to be the editor-in-chief of the Literaturnaya Gazeta, but he remained in the position of chairman of the editorial board of the Literaturnaya Gazeta.

In January 2018, he became Vladimir Putin's trusted person in the presidential elections of March 18, 2018. On November 20, 2018, as a result of rotation, he left the council under the president of the Russian Federation for Culture and Art.

In March 2022, he signed an appeal in support of Russia's invasion of Ukraine.

In 2024, he acted as an expert for Arkady Mamontov's documentary film "Foreign Agents", which aired on the state television channel Russia-24 in April 2024.
