= A Piece of Eden =

2000 film by John D. Hancock

- Directed by: John D. Hancock
- Written by: Dorothy Tristan
- Produced by: John D. Hancock
- Starring: Rebecca Harrell
- Cinematography: Misha Suslov
- Music by: Angelo Badalamenti
- Release date: 2000
- Running time: 106 minutes
- Country: United States
- Language: English

A Piece of Eden is a 2000 film directed by John D. Hancock. It was filmed at Hancock's home and apple orchard in La Porte, Indiana. His wife wrote the screenplay. The film had a limited release in theaters before being released on video. The film received a range of negative to positive reviews. It stars Marc Grapey, Rebecca Harrell, and Robert Breuler.

== Plot summary ==
After his father is severely burned in Indiana, television publicist Bob Tredici leaves New York to return to his father's home and decides to live there until his father, Franco, recovers. Other reasons compelling him to stay are a lack of success in his New York business, and his cousin, Greg, being expected to inherit the family's apple orchard. Tredici comes to realize that he enjoys farming and comes to want to own the apple orchard himself, making him envious of Greg.

While Franco lies in a hospital bed in his own living room, Tredici modernizes the family's orchard business by setting up a computer at his father's home and using modern marketing techniques. He asks Happy, his secretary from New York, to visit the farm and pretend to be his wife so that his father will think that he is more responsible than Greg. Tredici and Happy later become romantically attracted to each other. Tredici turns the orchard into an attraction for tourists and adds a petting zoo to it. Interspersed throughout the film, black and white flashbacks show the Tredici curse which supposedly affects the family, causing misfortune to befall them. A part of the curse is that "Tredici" is "13" in Italian. It is believed that the curse caused the failure of Tredici's New York business and his father being burnt. At the end of the film, Tredici's father has a change of heart and gives the farm to him.

== Production and release ==
Hancock's wife, the actress Dorothy Tristan, wrote the film's screenplay. Hancock filmed it independently at his home in La Porte, Indiana, with the main filming location being his apple orchard. This film was Hancock's first attempt at releasing a film without a distributor. The film premiered at the Chicago International Film Festival in October 1999. He originally had issues distributing his film in theaters and the first theaters to show the film were restricted to locations in his local area. Hancock personally called theater chains to attempt to further the release of the film nationwide. When speaking with theaters, he stated, "This is a film that may require some patience". Nonetheless, the film was only released in a limited selection of theaters before being released to video.

== Reception ==
Dave Kehr of The New York Times gave the film a positive review, stating, "At its best, A Piece of Eden finds a delicate balance between urban and rural values, progress and tradition, between experience and innocence".

Roger Ebert gave the film 1 1/2 stars and wrote, "A Piece of Eden is a good-hearted film with many virtues, although riveting entertainment value is not one of them", concluding with "the story line runs out of steam about four-fifths of the way through, and the closing scenes lack dramatic interest, dissolving in a haze of landscapes and blue skies and happily-ever-after music". Marc Savlov of The Austin Chronicle gave the film 2 stars and said, "The homilies being taught here are so broad in their scope, and so obvious, that they come less as surprises than simple speed bumps on the road to “The End".
