= California Dreaming (1979 film) =

1979 film by John D. Hancock

- Poster
- Directed by: John D. Hancock
- Written by: Ned Wynn
- Produced by: Christian Whittaker
- Starring: Glynnis O'Connor; Dennis Christopher; Seymour Cassel; Tanya Roberts
- Cinematography: Bobby Byrne
- Edited by: Herb Dow; Roy Peterson
- Music by: Fred Karlin
- Distributed by: American International Pictures
- Release date: March 16, 1979
- Running time: 92 minutes
- Country: United States
- Language: English
- Box office: $2 million (US rentals)

California Dreaming is a 1979 American comedy-drama film starring Glynnis O'Connor, Dennis Christopher, Seymour Cassel and Tanya Roberts and directed by John D. Hancock. The film explores the themes of growing up, finding love and self-knowledge, and reflects the contrast between life in industrial Chicago and the free Californian lifestyle.

== Plot ==
The film tells the story of a young man named Tony, who comes from Chicago to spend the summer in California. Immersed in the atmosphere of coastal life, he meets locals and tries to find his place in the world, among surfers and beachgoers. Tony moves into the house of the owner of a local club, which displeases his daughter, but he strives to win the trust and friendship of his new acquaintances.

The film combines elements of drama, comedy and melodrama, showing the process of adaptation of the hero to a new environment and his internal changes under the influence of the sunny and relaxed lifestyle of the Golden State

== Cast ==
- Glynnis O'Connor as Corky
- Seymour Cassel as Duke
- Dennis Christopher as T.T.
- Dorothy Tristan as Faye
- Tanya Roberts as Stephanie
- John Calvin as Rick
- Todd Susman as Jordy
- Alice Playten as Corrine
- Vivian Bonnell as Alma
- Bonnie Bartlett as Melinda Booke

== Production ==
California Dreaming is a production of American International Pictures (AIP), which pioneered the beach-party film in the 1960s. However, the film's producer Lou Arkoff, the son of AIP founder Samuel Z. Arkoff, stated a desire to "move [AIP] toward more serious, insightful and creative projects" rather than the exploitation films favored by his father, saying specifically of California Dreaming: "My concern is that this doesn't become Beach Blanket Bingo."

Filming began on October 17, 1977 at Santa Monica State Beach, the film's purported setting. However, most footage was shot at Pismo Beach, with Avila Beach also serving as a locale.

The script written by Ned Wynn was entitled State Beach, which was the film's working title (with Golden State mentioned as a possible alternative). Director John D. Hancock wanted to change the title to California Dreaming, and the new title was confirmed in December 1977. Permission for the title was obtained from the copyright holders of the song "California Dreamin'", although the film's storyline has no direct parallels with the song's lyrics. The film's poster features the slogan "A state somewhere between fantasy and reality" under the title.

Filming was completed in December 1978. The film's budget was $2 million.

John D. Hancock said that during filming, male cast members' attraction to Tanya Roberts caused tension on the set.

== Release ==
The planned July 1978 release of California Dreaming was postponed because of a perceived glut of similarly themed films set for release that summer (most prominently Big Wednesday). A rescheduled October 1978 was also canceled. The film finally premiered with a December 27-January 1 engagement at a Yuma, Arizona theater, as it was to AIP's advantage for taxation purposes to release the film before the end of 1978.

California Dreaming was provided a limited release on March 16, 1979, which was expanded in the following two months. The release schedule was planned to coincide with that of the film's soundtrack album, distributed by Casablanca Records. The version of "California Dreamin'" recorded by America that plays during California Dreaming's closing credits was issued as a single, spending eight weeks in the Billboard Hot 100 and peaking at #56.
