= Sergei Ursuliak =

Russian film director (born 1958)

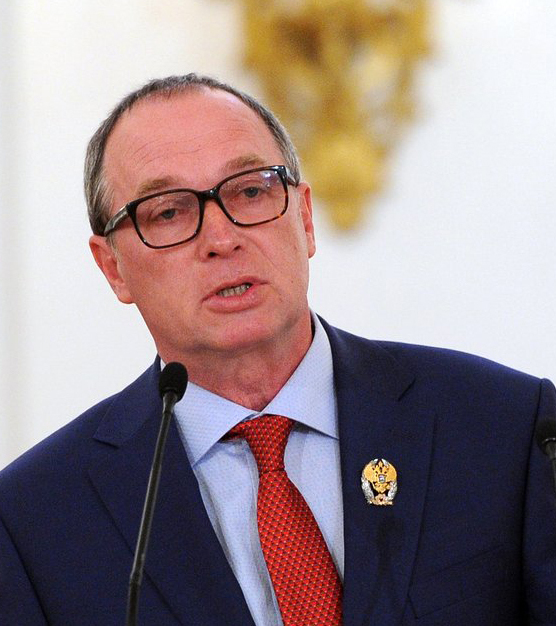
- Born: Sergei Vladimirovich Ursuliak; 10 June 1958 (age 68); Petropavlovsk-Kamchatsky, Russian SFSR, Soviet Union
- Education: Gerasimov Institute of Cinematography
- Occupations: Director, screenwriter

Sergei Vladimirovich Ursuliak (Russian: Серге́й Влади́мирович Урсуля́к; born 10 June 1958) is a Russian film director and screenwriter. He is known for the films Composition for Victory Day (1996) and Long Farewell (2004), and the TV series Liquidation. He has won several awards, including Nika Awards and the State Prize of the Russian Federation.

== Early life and education ==
Ursuliak was born on 10 June 1958 in Petropavlovsk-Kamchatsky, Russia.

He studied at the Gerasimov Institute of Cinematography.

== Career ==
He is a filmmaker, screenwriter and actor, and also presents programs on television.

== Awards ==
- 1996: Kinotavr — Panorama prize for work by established directors
- Prize of Russian Guild of Film Critics
- 2008, 2012: Nika Awards
- 2015: Award of the Government of Russian Federation in the field of culture
- 2016: State Prize of the Russian Federation

== Filmography ==
As director

- Russian Ragtime (1993)
- Summerfolk (1995)
- Notes from the Dead House (1997)
- Composition for Victory Day (1998)
- Failure Poirot (2002)
- Long Farewell (2004)
- Liquidation (TV series, 2007)
- Isayev (2008)
- Konstantin Raikin. One on One with the Audience (2012, documentary)
- Life and Fate (2012)
- And Quiet Flows the Don (2015)
- The Diamond Chariot (2021)
- Pravednik (Праведник; 2023)

== Personal life ==
Ursuliak has been married twice and has two daughters:

- First wife — actress Galina Nadirli
  - Daughter — actress Alexandra Ursuliak
- Second wife — actress Lika Nifontova
  - Daughter — actress Darya Ursuliak
