= John D. Hancock =

American film director

- Born: February 12, 1939 (age 87); Kansas City, Missouri, U.S.
- Education: Harvard University
- Occupations: Director, producer, screenwriter

John D. Hancock (born February 12, 1939) is an American stage and film director, producer and writer best known for his work on Bang the Drum Slowly. Hancock's theatrical work includes direction of both classic and contemporary plays, from Shakespeare to Saul Bellow.

== Early life ==
John was born in Kansas City, Missouri, the son of Ralph and Ella Mae Rosenthal Hancock. His father was a musician with the NBC Symphony Orchestra in Chicago, Illinois, and his mother a schoolteacher. Hancock spent his youth between their home in Chicago and their fruit farm in La Porte, Indiana. In high school, he was the Assistant Concertmaster of the Chicago Youth Orchestra playing the violin.

Hancock graduated from Harvard University. He continued his theatrical studies in Europe with a grant from Harvard and observed Bertolt Brecht's Berliner Ensemble.

== Career ==
He made his directorial debut at age 22 with the Off-Broadway hit production of Bertolt Brecht's Man Equals Man. This was followed by Robert Lowell's Endicott and the Red Cross. In 1968, Hancock directed Shakespeare's A Midsummer Night's Dream, which won him the Obie Award for Distinguished Director for the 1967–68 season. Cue Magazine noted, "This brutal, vulgar and erotic production of Shakespeare's sex fantasy is the most original and arresting I've ever witnessed. This is the best of all the Dreams and an important pioneering effort in re-interpreting the play."

Hancock's success on the New York stage led to his appointment as Artistic Director of the famed San Francisco Actor's Workshop in 1965. He later was appointed Artistic Director of the Pittsburgh Playhouse and The New Repertory Theatre in New York City.

Hancock worked closely on several occasions with playwright and author Tennessee Williams, who stated in his book Memoirs that Hancock was "the only director who has ever suggested to me transpositions of material that were artistically effective..."

In 1970, his "Sticky My Fingers...Fleet My Feet" was nominated for a Short-Subject Live-Action Academy Award. Hancock directed the short film with a grant from the American Film Institute. CBS purchased the movie and aired it during halftime of their Thanksgiving football game. It was released nationally with the Woody Allen feature Bananas.

As a feature film director, he is best known for the 1973 film Bang the Drum Slowly, starring Robert De Niro and Michael Moriarty. Hancock's other early film credits were Let's Scare Jessica to Death (1971) and Baby Blue Marine (1976). He worked on Jaws 2 (1978) before being removed from the production.

Hancock served on the board of trustees for the American Film Institute between 1973 and 1977.

A very difficult and controversial period for Hancock involved Jaws 2 which impacted his career as a director. Hancock did not have the experience to deal with the bureaucracy and became a pawn between the powerful political Hollywood studio players. He was the original director of Jaws 2, and his wife Dorothy Tristan did rewrites of the original screenplay by Howard Sackler, who had recommended Hancock for the job.

Hancock ran into trouble with MCA executive Sid Sheinberg. Sheinberg suggested to Hancock and Tristan that his wife Lorraine Gary "should go out on a boat and help to rescue the kids." When told of the idea, producer Richard D. Zanuck replied, "Over my dead body." "Obviously, what I should have done then was to get Zanuck and Sheinberg in the same room and say: 'Okay, you guys should give me direction because I really don't want to get between you two.' I was caught between these huge forces like a babe in the woods and paid the price for it. Jaws 2 is a very bitter, painful experience that took years to recover from." In June 1977, after a meeting with the producers and Universal executives, the director was abruptly fired and production shut down for a few weeks. They had been involved in the film for eighteen months. Jeannot Szwarc was hired to take over as director, and the script was rewritten by Carl Gottlieb.

Hancock followed his difficult experiences on Jaws 2 by directing the comedy/drama California Dreaming (1979), starring Dennis Christopher and Hancock's actress wife, Dorothy Tristan. Ironically, Hancock later replaced Michael Wadleigh as director on the troubled allegorical horror film Wolfen (1981), which was a box office failure but has steadily built a cult reputation over the years. Throughout the 1980s and 1990s, Hancock directed acclaimed episodes of NBC's Hill Street Blues and CBS's The Twilight Zone (1985 series), the latter including an adaptation of Theodore Sturgeon's science-fantasy story "A Saucer of Loneliness".

He also directed the prison drama Weeds (1987), starring Nick Nolte, and the holiday family film Prancer (1989), about an eight-year-old girl who discovers an injured reindeer she believes belongs to Santa Claus.

In 1998, Hancock opened his production company FilmAcres in LaPorte, Indiana, where he spent some of his childhood. In 1999, he produced and directed A Piece of Eden starring Tyne Daly. It is a semi-autobiographical story about a fruit farm and the relationship between a father and his son. The suspense thriller Suspended Animation was directed by Hancock in 2002.

Hancock wrote and directed the play The Brother in 2007 for a 12-week run at the Theatre Building in Chicago. The spy thriller is based on the book written by Sam Roberts, a noted author and New York Times reporter and editor. The play is based mostly on the untold story of David Greenglass who turned in Julius and Ethel Rosenberg for giving atomic bomb secrets to the Russians. "It (The Brother) is incredibly powerful. It is exceptional and really not to be missed."

In 2007, Hancock also directed a 12-week run of the Pulitzer-winner night, Mother starring Elaine Rivkin and Dorothy Tristan at the Theatre Building in Chicago which opened to rave reviews from the Chicago Reader.

In July 2009, Noises Off, under direction by Hancock, received generally positive reviews and sell out houses at the Wellfleet Harbor Arts Theatre Julie Harris Stage in Cape Cod, Massachusetts. "...Hancock displays his ability to make a play flow smoothly. A fast-paced romp from beginning to end. A backstage pass to hilarity." "Director John Hancock is working here almost more as traffic cop or circus ringmaster or knife juggler as he skillfully keeps his nine actors racing through meticulous comedic choreography."

== Filmography ==
- Sticky My Fingers, Fleet My Feet (1970)
- Let's Scare Jessica to Death (1971)
- Bang the Drum Slowly (1973)
- Baby Blue Marine (1976)
- California Dreaming (1979)
- Wolfen (1981) (uncredited)
- Weeds (1987)
- Steal the Sky (1988)
- Prancer (1989)
- A Piece of Eden (1999)
- Suspended Animation (2002)
- The Looking Glass (2015)
- The Girls of Summer (2020)

== Awards ==
- Brandeis University – Citation in Film – it reads in part: "His flair for warm comedy, gentle satire and strong emotional sensitivity combine to fashion motion pictures that are increasingly hailed by critics and audiences alike."
- Creative Arts Award Commission for "Sticky My Fingers...Fleet My Feet"
- Academy Award Nomination for Best Short Film for "Sticky My Fingers...Fleet My Feet"
- Outstanding Achievement Critics Choice – "Sticky My Fingers...Fleet My Feet". American Film Institute
- The Christopher Award
- First prize at Karlovy Vary

== Personal life ==
Hancock's marriage to Ann Arensberg ended in divorce in 1974. He married actress/screenwriter Dorothy Tristan in December 1975. Hancock worked closely with Tristan on a number of projects including the aborted first version of Jaws 2 in 1977 (which Tristan co-wrote with Howard Sackler) as well as California Dreaming, Weeds, A Piece of Eden, Suspended Animation and The Looking Glass. Dorothy Tristan died January 8th, 2023.
