= Valeriy Troshin =

- Born: Valeriy Vladimirovich Troshin; 9 March 1970 (age 56); Moscow, Russlan SFSR, USSR
- Occupation: Actor
- Years active: 1986–present
- Awards: Honored Artist of Russia; State Prize of the Russian Federation

Valeriy Vladimirovich Troshin (Russian: Вале́рий Влади́мирович Тро́шин; 9 March 1970) is a Soviet and Russian film and theater actor.

== Biography ==
Valeriy Troshin was born in Moscow. His mother was a doctor, his father - a teacher of physics. He became interested in theater thanks to his father, who is always engaged in amateur and arranged for the family the whole presentation. Valeriy also devoted much time to the visual arts, graphic and technical design.

As a child, he participated in theatrical productions mug.

He graduated from the Moscow Art Theatre School in 1996 (course Lev Durov) and was admitted to the troupe Moscow Art Theatre.

Since 2010, Valery Troshin director and teacher in the workshop Nikolay Skorik.

== Awards ==
- 2004 - Laureate of the State Prize of the Russian Federation
- 2006 - The honorary title of Honored Artist of Russia
- 2010 - Winner of the VIII International Theatre Forum Golden Knight silver certificate Best Actor

== Filmography ==
- 1987 - Visit to Minotaur
- 1987 - Slap, which was not
- 1989 - Name
- 1989 - Glass labyrinth
- 1989 - 100 Days Before the Command
- 1990 - Do It – One!
- 1996 - Klubnichka
- 2000 - Demobbed
- 2001 - 101-km
- 2001 - Family Secrets
- 2002 - Marsh Turetskogo
- 2002 - Brigada
- 2002 - Antikiller
- 2004 - The Long Goodbye
- 2005 - The White Guard
- 2005-2006 - Luba, children and the plant
- 2007 - Liquidation
- 2007 - Law & Order: Department of operative investigations
- 2008 - Univer
- 2011 - Made in the USSR
- 2013 - Miracle Worker

== Personal life ==
Actor divorced, has a daughter and a son.
