= List of American films of 1980 =

This is a list of American films released in 1980.

== Box office ==
The highest-grossing American films released in 1980, by domestic box office gross revenue, are as follows:

Highest-grossing films of 1980
Rank	Title	Distributor	Domestic gross
1	The Empire Strikes Back	20th Century Fox	$209,398,025
2	9 to 5	20th Century Fox	$103,290,500
3	Stir Crazy	Columbia	$101,300,000
4	Airplane!	Paramount	$83,453,539
5	Any Which Way You Can	Warner Bros.	$70,687,344
6	Private Benjamin	Warner Bros.	$69,847,348
7	Coal Miner's Daughter	Universal	$67,182,787
8	Smokey and the Bandit II	Universal	$66,132,626
9	The Blue Lagoon	Columbia	$58,853,106
10	The Blues Brothers	Universal	$57,229,890

== January–March ==
Opening		Title	Production company	Cast and crew	Ref.
J A N U A R Y	18	Cardiac Arrest	Film Ventures International	Murray Mintz (director/screenplay); Max Gail, Garry Goodrow, Mike Paul Chan, Ray Reinhardt, Robert Behling, Susan O'Connell, Fred Ward	
J A N U A R Y	18	Just Tell Me What You Want	Warner Bros.	Sidney Lumet (director); Jay Presson Allen (screenplay); Ali MacGraw, Alan King, Peter Weller, Myrna Loy, Dina Merrill, Keenan Wynn, Tony Roberts, Judy Kaye, Joseph Maher	
J A N U A R Y	18	Windows	United Artists / Mike Lobell Productions	Gordon Willis (director); Barry Siegel (screenplay); Talia Shire, Joseph Cortese, Elizabeth Ashley, Kay Medford, Michael Lipton, Ron Ryan, Michael Gorrin, Russell Horton, Rick Petrucelli, Tony DiBenedetto, Marty Greene, Gerry Vichi	
J A N U A R Y	22	In Search of Historic Jesus	Sunn Classic Pictures	Henning Schellerup (director); Jack Jacobs, Lee Roddy, Charles E. Sellier Jr., Robert Starling, Malvin Wald (screenplay); John Rubinstein, Brad Crandall	
J A N U A R Y	23	Caboblanco	AVCO Embassy Pictures	J. Lee Thompson (director); Morton S. Fine, Milton S. Gelman (screenplay); Charles Bronson, Jason Robards, Dominique Sanda, Fernando Rey, Denny Miller, Simon MacCorkindale, Camilla Sparv, Gilbert Roland, Clifton James	
J A N U A R Y	30	To All a Goodnight	Intercontinental Releasing Corporation / Four Features Partners	David Hess (director); Alex Rebar (screenplay); Jennifer Runyon, Forrest Swanson, Linda Gentile, William Lauer, Judith Bridges, Katherine Herrington, Buck West, Sam Shamshak, Angela Bath, Denise Stearns, Solomon Trager, Jeff Butts, Dan Stryker	
F E B R U A R Y	1	American Gigolo	Paramount Pictures	Paul Schrader (director/screenplay); Richard Gere, Lauren Hutton, Nina van Pallandt, Tom Stewart, Robert Wightman, David Cryer, Brian Davies, Richard Derr, Bill Duke, Héctor Elizondo, Frances Bergen, Carol Bruce, K Callan, Patricia Carr, Carole Cook, MacDonald Carey, William Dozier	
F E B R U A R Y	1	Fatso	20th Century Fox / Brooksfilms	Anne Bancroft (director/screenplay); Dom DeLuise, Anne Bancroft, Candice Azzara, Ron Carey, David Comfort, Richard Karron, Michael Lombard, Ralph Manza, Estelle Reiner, Natasha Ryan, Sal Viscuso, Paul Zegler, Father Bob Curtis	
F E B R U A R Y	1	Simon	Orion Pictures	Marshall Brickman (director/screenplay); Alan Arkin, Madeline Kahn, Austin Pendleton, Judy Graubart, William Finley, Wallace Shawn, Jayant, Max Wright, Fred Gwynne, Adolph Green, Keith Szarabajka, Ann Risley, Rex Robbins, David Warrilow, Louise Lasser, Dick Cavett, Pierre Epstein, Roy Cooper, Hetty Galen	
F E B R U A R Y	8	2001: A Space Odyssey (re-release)	Metro-Goldwyn-Mayer	Stanley Kubrick (director/screenplay); Arthur C. Clarke (screenplay); Keir Dullea, Gary Lockwood, William Sylvester, Daniel Richter, Leonard Rossiter, Margaret Tyzack, Robert Beatty, Sean Sullivan, Douglas Rain, Edward Bishop, Penny Brahms, Alan Gifford, Ann Gillis, Vivian Kubrick, Kenneth Kendall, Frank Miller, Edwina Carroll, Heather Downham, Maggie d'Abo, Chela Matthison, Judy Keirn	
F E B R U A R Y	8	Hero at Large	United Artists	Martin Davidson (director); A. J. Carothers (screenplay); John Ritter, Anne Archer, Bert Convy, Kevin McCarthy, Harry Bellaver, Leonard Harris, Kevin Bacon, Dr. Joyce Brothers, Robin Sherwood, Penny Crone, Jane Hallaren	
F E B R U A R Y	8	The Fog	AVCO Embassy Pictures	John Carpenter (director/screenplay); Debra Hill (screenplay); Adrienne Barbeau, Jamie Lee Curtis, John Houseman, Janet Leigh, Hal Holbrook, Tom Atkins, Nancy Loomis, Charles Cyphers, George Buck Flower, Darwin Joston, Rob Bottin, John Carpenter, Ty Mitchell, James Canning, John F. Goff, Regina Waldon	
F E B R U A R Y	8	The Last Married Couple in America	Universal Pictures	Gilbert Cates (director); John Herman Shaner (screenplay); George Segal, Natalie Wood, Richard Benjamin, Valerie Harper, Dom DeLuise, Bob Dishy, Arlene Golonka, Allan Arbus, Priscilla Barnes, Catherine Hickland, Sondra Currie, Oliver Clark	
F E B R U A R Y	8	Midnight Madness	Walt Disney Productions / Buena Vista Distribution	Michael Nankin, David Wechter (directors/screenplay); David Naughton, Michael J. Fox, Stephen Furst, Maggie Roswell, Eddie Deezen, Dirk Blocker, Patricia Alice Albrecht, Andy Tennant, Irene Tedrow, John Fiedler, Charlie Brill, Loretta Tupper, Marvin Kaplan, Georgia Schmidt, Paul Reubens, John Voldstad, Emily Greer, Debra Clinger, Brad Wilkin, Alan Solomon, Debi Richter, Kirsten Baker, Ceil Gabot, Tony Salome	
F E B R U A R Y	8	The Young Master	Golden Harvest / Media Asia Group	Jackie Chan (director/screenplay); Edward Tang, Lau Tin-chi, Tung Lu (screenplay); Jackie Chan, Yuen Biao, Fung Fung, Shih Kien, Tien Feng, Lee Hoi-sang, Lily Li, Hwang In-Shik, Fung Hak-kun, Wei Pai, Fan Mei, Yue Tau-ean, Bruce Tang Yim-chan	
F E B R U A R Y	15	Caligula	Produzioni Atlas Consorziate (P.A.C.) / Analysis Film Releasing Corporation / Penthouse Films International / Felix Cinematografica	Tinto Brass (director/screenplay); Giancarlo Lui, Bob Guccione (directors); Malcolm McDowell, Teresa Ann Savoy, Helen Mirren, Peter O'Toole, John Gielgud, Guido Mannari, Patrick Allen, Giancarlo Badessi, Adriana Asti, Leopoldo Trieste, Paolo Bonacelli, Joss Ackland, John Steiner, Mirella D'Angelo, Richard Parets, Osiride Pevarello, Anneka Di Lorenzo, Bruno Brive, Paula Mitchell, Donato Placido, Lori Wagner, Valerie Rae Clark, Susanne Saxon, Jane Hargrave, Carolyn Patsis, Bonnie Dee Wilson	
F E B R U A R Y	15	Cruising	United Artists / Lorimar Film Entertainment	William Friedkin (director/screenplay); Al Pacino, Paul Sorvino, Karen Allen, Richard Cox, Don Scardino, Joe Spinell, Jay Acovone, Randy Jurgensen, Barton Heyman, Gene Davis, Arnaldo Santana, Larry Atlas, Allan Miller, Sonny Grosso, Edward O'Neill, Michael Aronin, James Remar, William Russ, Mike Starr, Leo Burmester, Henry Judd Baker, Steve Inwood, Keith Prentice, Leland Starnes, Powers Boothe	
F E B R U A R Y	15	Mad Max	Warner Bros. / Roadshow Film Distributors / Kennedy Miller Productions	George Miller (director/screenplay); James McCausland (screenplay); Mel Gibson, Joanne Samuel, Hugh Keays-Byrne, Steve Bisley, Tim Burns, Roger Ward, Geoff Parry, Jonathan Hardy, Brendan Heath, Sheila Florence, John Ley, Steve Millichamp, Vincent Gil, Lulu Pinkus, Reg Evans, Karen Moregold	
F E B R U A R Y	15	Saturn 3	ITC Film Distribution	Stanley Donen (director); Martin Amis (screenplay); Farrah Fawcett, Kirk Douglas, Harvey Keitel, Roy Dotrice, Ed Bishop	
F E B R U A R Y	25	Scruples	CBS / Warner Bros. Television Distribution	Alan J. Levi (director); James Lee (teleplay); Lindsay Wagner, Barry Bostwick, Marie-France Pisier, Efrem Zimbalist Jr., Kim Cattrall, Gene Tierney, Nick Mancuso, Gavin MacLeod, Connie Stevens, Robert Reed, Gary Graham	
F E B R U A R Y	29	Don't Answer the Phone	Crown International Pictures	Robert Hammer (director/screenplay); Michael D. Castle (screenplay); James Westmoreland, Denise Galik, Nicholas Worth, Ben Frank, Flo Garrish, Stan Haze, Gary Allen, Michael D. Castle, Pamela Jean Bryant	
F E B R U A R Y	29	Foxes	United Artists / PolyGram Pictures / Casablanca Records & Filmworks	Adrian Lyne (director); Gerald Ayres (screenplay); Jodie Foster, Scott Baio, Sally Kellerman, Randy Quaid, Cherie Currie, Lois Smith, Laura Dern, Robert Romanus, Adam Faith, Marilyn Kagan, Kandice Stroh	
F E B R U A R Y	29	The Ninth Configuration	Warner Bros. / United Film Distribution	William Peter Blatty (director/screenplay); Stacy Keach, Scott Wilson, Jason Miller, Ed Flanders, Neville Brand, George DiCenzo, Moses Gunn, Robert Loggia, Joe Spinell, Alejandro Rey, Tom Atkins, Steve Sandor, Richard Lynch, William Peter Blatty	
F E B R U A R Y	29	S*H*E	Nb Productions	Robert Michael Lewis (director); Richard Maibaum (screenplay); Cornelia Sharpe, Omar Sharif, Robert Lansing, Anita Ekberg, Fabio Testi, William Traylor, Isabella Rye, Tom Christopher, Mario Colli, Claudio Ruffini, Geoffrey Copleston, Fortunato Arena, Gino Marturano, Emilio Messina, Rory Maclean, Fritz Hammer	
M A R C H	7	Coal Miner's Daughter	Universal Pictures	Michael Apted (director); Tom Rickman (screenplay); Sissy Spacek, Tommy Lee Jones, Beverly D'Angelo, Levon Helm, William Sanderson, Grant Turner, Ernest Tubb, Roy Acuff, Minnie Pearl, Bob Elkins, Phyllis Boyens, Bob Hannah	
M A R C H	7	Lady and the Tramp (re-release)	Walt Disney Productions / Buena Vista Film Distribution	Clyde Geronimi, Wilfred Jackson, Hamilton Luske (directors); Barbara Luddy, Larry Roberts, Bill Thompson, Dallas McKennon, Bill Baucom, Verna Felton, Peggy Lee, George Givot, Lee Millar, Stan Freberg, Alan Reed, Thurl Ravenscroft, The Mellomen	
M A R C H	7	Permanent Vacation	Cinesthesia	Jim Jarmusch (director/screenplay); Richard Boes, Ruth Bolton, Sara Driver, María Duval, Frankie Faison, Jane Fire, Suzanne Fletcher, Leila Gastil, Chris Hameon, John Lurie, Eric Mitchell, Chris Parker, Lisa Rosen, Felice Rosser, Evelyn Smith, Charlie Spademan	
M A R C H	14	Defiance	American International Pictures	John Flynn (director); Thomas Michael Donnelly, Mark Tulin (screenplay); Jan-Michael Vincent, Theresa Saldana, Art Carney, Danny Aiello, Rudy Ramos, Lenny Montana, Joseph Campanella, Santos Morales, Frank Pesce, Fernando López	
M A R C H	14	A Small Circle of Friends	United Artists	Rob Cohen (director); Tim Zinnemann (screenplay); Brad Davis, Karen Allen, Jameson Parker, Shelley Long, Peter Mark	
M A R C H	15	Breaker Morant	Roadshow Film Distributors	Bruce Beresford (director/screenplay); Jonathan Hardy, David Stevens (screenplay); Edward Woodward, Jack Thompson, John Waters, Bryan Brown, Charles 'Bud' Tingwell, Terence Donovan, Ray Meagher, Lewis Fitz-Gerald, Rod Mullinar, Frank Wilson, David Wenham, Alan Cassell, Vincent Ball, Chris Haywood, Russell Kiefel, Rob Steele, Chris Smith, Bruno Knez	
M A R C H	21	Forbidden Zone	The Samuel Goldwyn Company	Richard Elfman (director/screenplay); Matthew Bright, Nick James, Nick L. Martinson (screenplay); Hervé Villechaize, Susan Tyrrell, Marie-Pascale Elfman, Danny Elfman, Gisele Lindley, Jan Stuart Schwartz, Virginia Rose, Ugh-Fudge Bwana, Phil Gordon, Hyman Diamond, Toshiro Boloney, Viva, Joe Spinell, The Kipper Kids, Kedric Wolfe, Herman Bernstein, Richard Elfman	
M A R C H	21	Little Darlings	Paramount Pictures	Ronald F. Maxwell (director); Kimi Peck, Dalene Young (screenplay); Tatum O'Neal, Kristy McNichol, Armand Assante, Matt Dillon, Maggie Blye, Nicolas Coster, Marianne Gordon, Krista Errickson, Alexa Kenin, Cynthia Nixon, Mary Betten, Abby Bluestone, Troas Hayes, Simone Schachter, Jenn Thompson	
M A R C H	21	Little Miss Marker	Universal Pictures	Walter Bernstein (director/screenplay); Damon Runyon (screenplay); Walter Matthau, Julie Andrews, Tony Curtis, Bob Newhart, Sara Stimson, Brian Dennehy, Kenneth McMillan, Lee Grant, Andrew Rubin, Ralph Manza	
M A R C H	21	Nijinsky	Paramount Pictures / Hera Productions	Herbert Ross (director); Hugh Wheeler, Romola Nijinsky, Vaslav Nijinsky (screenplay); Alan Bates, Leslie Browne, George de la Peña, Alan Badel, Colin Blakely, Carla Fracci, Ronald Pickup, Vernon Dobtcheff, Frederick Jaeger, Janet Suzman, Siân Phillips, Ronald Lacey, Jeremy Irons, Anton Dolin, Hetty Baynes	
M A R C H	28	The Changeling	Pan-Canadian Film Distributors / Chessman Park Productions	Peter Medak (director); William Gray, Diana Maddox (screenplay); George C. Scott, Trish Van Devere, Melvyn Douglas, John Colicos, Jean Marsh, Helen Burns, Madeleine Sherwood, Barry Morse, Helen Burns, Frances Hyland, Eric Christmas, Roberta Maxwell, J. Kenneth Campbell, Janne Mortil, Terence Kelly, Antonia Rey, Louis Zorich, Bernard Behrens, James B. Douglas, Michelle Martin, Voldi Way	
M A R C H	28	Gilda Live	Warner Bros.	Mike Nichols (director); Anne Beatts, Lorne Michaels, Marilyn Suzanne Miller, Don Novello, Michael O'Donoghue, Gilda Radner, Paul Shaffer, Rosie Shuster, Alan Zweibel (screenplay); Gilda Radner	
M A R C H	28	Serial	Paramount Pictures	Bill Persky (director); Rich Eustis, Michael Elias (screenplay); Martin Mull, Tuesday Weld, Jennifer McAllister, Sally Kellerman, Bill Macy, Pamela Bellwood, Peter Bonerz, Christopher Lee, Sam Chew Jr., Nita Talbot, Barbara Rhoades, Stacey Nelkin, Tom Smothers, Clark Brandon, Robin Sherwood, Anthony Battaglia, Ann Weldon, Patch Mackenzie, Paul Rossilli	
M A R C H	28	Tom Horn	Warner Bros. / First Artists / Solar Productions	William Wiard (director); Thomas McGuane, Bud Shrake (screenplay); Steve McQueen, Linda Evans, Richard Farnsworth, Billy Green Bush, Slim Pickens, Elisha Cook, Roy Jenson, James Kline, Geoffrey Lewis, Harry Northup, Steve Oliver, Bill Thurman, Bobby Bass, Mickey Jones, Mel Novak, Chuck Hayward, Clark Coleman, Drummond Barclay, Peter Canon, Bert Williams	
M A R C H	28	When Time Ran Out	Warner Bros.	James Goldstone (director); Carl Foreman, Stirling Silliphant (screenplay); Paul Newman, Jacqueline Bisset, William Holden, Edward Albert, Red Buttons, Barbara Carrera, Valentina Cortese, Veronica Hamel, Alex Karras, Burgess Meredith, Ernest Borgnine, James Franciscus, John Considine, Sheila Allen, Pat Morita, Lonny Chapman, Sandy Kenyon, Ava Readdy, Glynn Rubin	

== April–June ==
Opening		Title	Production company	Cast and crew	Ref.
A P R I L	1	The Baltimore Bullet	AVCO Embassy Pictures	Robert Ellis Miller (director); John Brascia, Robert Vincent O'Neil (screenplay); James Coburn, Omar Sharif, Bruce Boxleitner, Ronee Blakley, Jack O'Halloran, Calvin Lockhart, Michael Lerner, Rockne Tarkington, Paul Barselou	
A P R I L	7	Health	20th Century Fox / Lion's Gate Films	Robert Altman (director/screenplay); Frank Barhydt, Paul Dooley (screenplay); Carol Burnett, Glenda Jackson, James Garner, Lauren Bacall, Paul Dooley, Henry Gibson, Alfre Woodard, Donald Moffat, Dick Cavett, Dinah Shore, Nancy Foster, Nathalie Blossom, Julie Janney, Patty Katz, Diane Shaffer	
A P R I L	7	North Sea Hijack	Universal/CIC	Andrew V. McLaglen (director); Jack Davies (screenplay); Roger Moore, Lea Brodie, James Mason, Anthony Perkins, Michael Parks, David Hedison, Jack Watson, George Baker, Jeremy Clyde, David Wood, Faith Brook, Anthony Pullen Shaw, Philip O'Brien, John Westbrook, Jennifer Hilary, John Lee	
A P R I L	8	The Gambler	CBS / Sony Pictures Television / Ken Kragen Productions	Dick Lowry (director); Jim Byrnes (screenplay); Kenny Rogers, Christine Belford, Bruce Boxleitner, Harold Gould, Clu Gulager, Lance LeGault, Lee Purcell, Ronnie Scribner, Noble Willingham, Bruce M. Fischer, Lee Paul, Marianne Gordon, David S. Cass Sr., Borah Silver, Lew Brown, Robert Lussier, Edward Walsh, Cathy Worthington, Charles Knapp, Ed Bakey, Neil Summers	
A P R I L	10	Bad Timing	World Northal	Nicolas Roeg (director); Yale Udoff (screenplay); Art Garfunkel, Theresa Russell, Harvey Keitel, Denholm Elliott, Daniel Massey, Dana Gillespie, William Hootkins, Eugene Lipinski, Ania Marson, Lex van Delden, Gertan Klauber, George Roubicek, Robert Walker, Stefan Gryff, Sevilla Delofski	
A P R I L	10	Home Movies	United Artists	Brian De Palma (director); Kim Ambler, Dana Edelman, Robert Harders, Stephen Le May, Charlie Loventhal, Gloria Norris (screenplay); Kirk Douglas, Nancy Allen, Keith Gordon, Vincent Gardenia, Gerrit Graham, Theresa Saldana	
A P R I L	17	The Private Eyes	New World Pictures / The Private Eyes Partners Limited	Lang Elliott (director); Tim Conway, John Myhers (screenplay); Tim Conway, Don Knotts, Trisha Noble, John Fujioka, Bernard Fox, Grace Zabriskie, Stan Ross, Irwin Keyes, Suzy Mandel	
A P R I L	17	Stalker	Goskino / Mosfilm	Andrei Tarkovsky (director/screenplay); Boris Strugatsky, Arkady Strugatsky (screenplay); Alexander Kaidanovsky, Anatoly Solonitsyn, Nikolai Grinko, Alisa Freindlich, Sergei Yakovlev, Natasha Abramova, Faime Jurno, E. Kostin, Raymo Rendi, Vladimir Zamansky	
A P R I L	17	The Watcher in the Woods	Walt Disney Productions / Buena Vista Distribution	John Hough (director); Brian Clemens, Harry Spalding, Rosemary Anne Sisson (screenplay); Bette Davis, Carroll Baker, David McCallum, Lynn-Holly Johnson, Kyle Richards, Ian Bannen, Richard Pasco, Frances Cuka, Benedict Taylor, Eleanor Summerfield, Georgina Hale, Katharine Levy	
A P R I L	24	Death Watch	Quartet Films / SELTA Films / Little Bear / Sara Films / Gaumont / Antenne 2 / TV 13 Munich	Bertrand Tavernier (director/screenplay); David Rayfiel (screenplay); Romy Schneider, Harvey Keitel, Max von Sydow, Harry Dean Stanton, Thérèse Liotard, William Russell, Vadim Glowna, Caroline Langrishe, Bernhard Wicki, Robbie Coltrane	
A P R I L	25	Heart Beat	Warner Bros.	John Byrum (director/screenplay); Nick Nolte, Sissy Spacek, John Heard, Ray Sharkey, Ann Dusenberry, Margaret Fairchild, John Larroquette, David Lynch, Tony Bill, Don Brodie	
A P R I L	25	Where the Buffalo Roam	Universal Pictures	Art Linson (director); John Kaye (screenplay); Bill Murray, Peter Boyle, Bruno Kirby, René Auberjonois, R. G. Armstrong, Mark Metcalf, Craig T. Nelson, Brian Cummings	
M A Y	1	Gorp	American International Pictures	Joseph Ruben (director); Jeffrey Konvitz, A. Martin Zweiback (screenplay); Michael Lembeck, Dennis Quaid, Fran Drescher, Rosanna Arquette, Philip Casnoff, Lisa Shure, David Huddleston, Robert Trebor, Lou Wagner, Julius Harris	
M A Y	9	Friday the 13th	Paramount Pictures	Sean S. Cunningham (director); Victor Miller (screenplay); Betsy Palmer, Adrienne King, Harry Crosby, Laurie Bartram, Mark Nelson, Jeannine Taylor, Robbi Morgan, Kevin Bacon, Rex Everhart, Ronn Carroll, Walt Gorney, Ari Lehman, Peter Brouwer, Willie Adams, Debra S. Hayes, Sally Anne Golden	
M A Y	9	The Nude Bomb	Universal Pictures	Clive Donner (director); Bill Dana, Arne Sultan, Leonard Stern (screenplay); Don Adams, Sylvia Kristel, Rhonda Fleming, Dana Elcar, Pamela Hensley, Andrea Howard, Norman Lloyd, Vittorio Gassman, Earl Maynard, Robert Karvelas, Gary Imhoff, Sarah Rush, Joey Forman, Robert Ball, Walter Brooke, Richard Sanders, Vito Scotti, Bill Dana, Thomas Hill	
M A Y	9	Out of the Blue	Les Productions Karim	Dennis Hopper (director); Leonard Yakir, Gary Jules Juvenat (screenplay); Linda Manz, Dennis Hopper, Sharon Farrell, Don Gordon, Raymond Burr, Eric Allen, Fiona Brody, David L. Crowley, Joan Hoffman, Carl Nelson, Francis Ann Pettit, Glen Pfeifer, Jim Byrnes, Pointed Sticks	
M A Y	11	The Return of the King	ABC / Topcraft / Rankin/Bass Productions	Jules Bass, Arthur Rankin Jr. (directors); Romeo Muller (screenplay); Orson Bean, John Huston, William Conrad, Roddy McDowall, Theodore Bikel, Paul Frees, Nellie Bellflower, Brother Theodore, Casey Kasem, Sonny Melendrez, Don Messick, John Stephenson, Glenn Yarbrough	
M A Y	16	Fame	United Artists	Alan Parker (director); Christopher Gore (screenplay); Eddie Barth, Irene Cara, Lee Curreri, Laura Dean, Antonia Franceschi, Boyd Gaines, Albert Hague, Tresa Hughes, Steve Inwood, Paul McCrane, Anne Meara, Joanna Merlin, Barry Miller, Jim Moody, Gene Anthony Ray, Maureen Teefy, Debbie Allen, Richard Belzer, Bill Britten, Isaac Mizrahi, Sal Piro, Michael DeLorenzo, Meg Tilly	
M A Y	16	The Great Rock 'n' Roll Swindle	Virgin Films	Julien Temple (director/screenplay); Malcolm McLaren, Steve Jones, Paul Cook, Sid Vicious, Johnny Rotten, Ronnie Biggs, Mary Millington, Irene Handl, Liz Fraser, Jess Conrad, Helen of Troy, Tenpole Tudor, James Aubrey, Johnny Shannon, Judy Croll, Peter Dean, Dave Dee, Alan Jones	
M A Y	16	Humanoids from the Deep	New World Pictures	Barbara Peeters (director); Frederick James (screenplay); Doug McClure, Ann Turkel, Vic Morrow, Lynn Schiller, Anthony Pena, Denise Galik, David Strassman, Greg Travis, Linda Shayne, Cindy Weintraub, Meegan King, Breck Costin, Hoke Howell, Don Maxwell, Lisa Glaser, Julie Kestel, Bruce Monette, Shawn Erler	
M A Y	16	The Long Riders	United Artists / Huka Productions	Walter Hill (director); Bill Bryden, Steven Phillip Smith, Stacy Keach, James Keach (screenplay); David Carradine, Keith Carradine, Robert Carradine, James Keach, Stacy Keach, Dennis Quaid, Randy Quaid, Christopher Guest, Nicholas Guest, Savannah Smith Boucher, James Whitmore Jr., Kevin Brophy, Harry Carey Jr., Shelby Leverington, Felice Orlandi, Pamela Reed, Lin Shaye, James Remar, Ever Carradine, Kalen Keach	
M A Y	21	The Empire Strikes Back	20th Century Fox / Lucasfilm	Irvin Kershner (director); Leigh Brackett, Lawrence Kasdan (screenplay); Mark Hamill, Harrison Ford, Carrie Fisher, Billy Dee Williams, David Prowse, James Earl Jones, Anthony Daniels, Kenny Baker, Peter Mayhew, Frank Oz, Alec Guinness, Jeremy Bulloch, John Hollis, Jack Purvis, Clive Revill, Kenneth Colley, Julian Glover, Michael Sheard, Michael Culver, Bruce Boa, Christopher Malcolm, Denis Lawson, Richard Oldfield, John Morton, Ian Liston, John Ratzenberger, Brigitte Kahn, Bob Anderson, Richard Bonehill, Tony Clarkin, Peter Diamond, Marjorie Eaton, Mike Edmonds, Stuart Fell, Joe Johnston, Ralph McQuarrie, Treat Williams, Jason Wingreen	
M A Y	23	Carny	United Artists / Lorimar Film Entertainment	Robert Kaylor (director/screenplay); Phoebe Kaylor, Robbie Robertson, Thomas Baum (screenplay); Gary Busey, Jodie Foster, Robbie Robertson, Meg Foster, Kenneth McMillan, Elisha Cook Jr., Tim Thomerson, Teddy Wilson, John Lehne, Bill McKinney, Bert Remsen, Woodrow Parfrey, Alan Braunstein, Tina Andrews, Craig Wasson, Fred Ward, Johann Petursson	
M A Y	23	Die Laughing	Orion Pictures	Jeff Werner (director); Jerry Segal, Robby Benson, Scott Parker (screenplay); Robby Benson, Linda Grovenor, Charles Durning, Elsa Lanchester, Bud Cort, Rita Taggart, Larry Hankin, Sam Krachmalnick, Peter Coyote, Charles Fleischer, Carel Struycken, Maurice Argent, Rhoda Gemignani, O-Lan Jones, Marty Zagon, Michael David Lee, Charles Harwood, Melanie Henderson, Chuck Dorsett, John Bracci, John Tim Burrus, Roger Johnson, John E. Tidwell, Cynthia Brian	
M A Y	23	The Gong Show Movie	Universal Pictures	Chuck Barris (director/screenplay); Robert Downey (screenplay); Chuck Barris, Robin Altman, James B. Douglas, Mabel King, Jaye P. Morgan, Rip Taylor	
M A Y	23	The Shining	Warner Bros.	Stanley Kubrick (director/screenplay); Diane Johnson (screenplay); Jack Nicholson, Shelley Duvall, Scatman Crothers, Danny Lloyd, Barry Nelson, Philip Stone, Joe Turkel, Anne Jackson, Tony Burton, Barry Dennen, Lia Beldam, Billie Gibson, Lisa and Louise Burns	
M A Y	30	Bon Voyage, Charlie Brown (and Don't Come Back!!)	Paramount Pictures / Bill Melendez Productions / Lee Mendelson Film Productions / United Feature Syndicate	Bill Melendez, Phil Roman (directors); Charles M. Schulz (screenplay); Arrin Skelley, Daniel Anderson, Patricia Patts, Casey Carlson, Annalisa Bortolin, Laura Planting, Bill Melendez, Pascale De Barolet, Roseline Rubens, Debbie Muller, Scott Beach	
M A Y	30	The Hollywood Knights	Columbia Pictures / PolyGram Pictures / Casablanca Filmworks	Floyd Mutrux (director/screenplay); Robert Wuhl, Tony Danza, Fran Drescher, Michelle Pfeiffer, Stuart Pankin, Debra Feuer, Leigh French, Glenn Withrow, Gary Graham, Sandy Helberg, Gailard Sartain, Richard Schaal, Randy Gornel, James Jeter, P.R. Paul, Julius Averitt, Carol Ann Williams	
J U N E	1	The Mountain Men	Columbia Pictures / Polyc International BV	Richard Lang (director); Fraser Clarke Heston (screenplay); Charlton Heston, Brian Keith, Stephen Macht, John Glover, Seymour Cassel, Bill Lucking, Victor Jory, Michael Greene, Victoria Racimo, David Ackroyd, Cal Bellini, Ken Ruta	
J U N E	4	The Happy Hooker Goes Hollywood	Cannon Films / Golan-Globus Productions	Alan Roberts (director); Devin Goldenberg (screenplay); Martine Beswick, Adam West, Phil Silvers, Chris Lemmon, Edie Adams, Richard Deacon, Dick Miller, Charles Green, Lisa London, Tanya Boyd, Susan Kiger, Lindsay Bloom, Army Archerd, Kim Hopkins	
J U N E	6	Galaxina	Crown International Pictures	William Sachs (director/screenplay); Stephen Macht, Avery Schreiber, James David Hinton, Dorothy Stratten, Lionel Mark Smith, Tad Horino, Percy Rodrigues, George Mather, Susan Kiger, Rhonda Shear, Ronald J. Knight, Herb Kaplowitz, Nancy McCauley, Fred D. Scott	
J U N E	6	Up the Academy	Warner Bros.	Robert Downey Sr. (director); Tom Patchett, Jay Tarses (screenplay); Wendell Brown, Tommy Citera, Ron Leibman, Harry Teinowitz, Hutch Parker, Ralph Macchio, Tom Poston, King Coleman, Barbara Bach, Ian Wolfe, Antonio Fargas, Stacey Nelkin, Leonard Frey, Robert Downey Jr.	
J U N E	6	Urban Cowboy	Paramount Pictures	James Bridges (director/screenplay); Aaron Latham (screenplay); John Travolta, Debra Winger, Scott Glenn, Barry Corbin, Madolyn Smith, Brooke Alderson, Cooper Huckabee, James Gammon, Mickey Gilley, Johnny Lee, Bonnie Raitt, Charlie Daniels, Tamara Champlin, Jerry Hall, Ellen March, Jessie La Rive, Howard Henson, Connie Hanson, Becky Conway, Cyndy Hall	
J U N E	11	Bronco Billy	Warner Bros.	Clint Eastwood (director); Dennis Hackin (screenplay); Clint Eastwood, Sondra Locke, Geoffrey Lewis, Scatman Crothers, Bill McKinney, Sam Bottoms, Dan Vadis, Sierra Pecheur, Walter Barnes, Woodrow Parfrey, Beverlee McKinsey, Doug McGrath, Hank Worden, Tessa Richarde, William Prince	
J U N E	13	The Children	World Northal	Max Kalmanowicz (director); Carlton J. Albright, Edward Terry (screenplay); Martin Shakar, Gil Rogers, Gale Garnett, Shannon Bolin, Peter Maloney, Tracy Griswold, Joy Glaccum, Jeptha Evans, Clara Evans, Sarah Albright, Nathanael Albright, Julie Carrier, Michelle Le Mothe, Edward Terry, Jessie Abrams, Rita Montone, John P. Codiglia, Martin Brennan, J.D. Clarke, James Klawin, Arthur Chase, Suzanne Barnes, Diane Deckard, David Platt, Michael Carrier, June Berry, Ray Delmolino, X. Ben Fakackt	
J U N E	13	The Island	Universal Pictures / Zanuck/Brown Company	Michael Ritchie (director); Peter Benchley (screenplay); Michael Caine, David Warner, Angela Punch McGregor, Frank Middlemass, Don Henderson, Dudley Sutton, Colin Jeavons, Jeffrey Frank, Zakes Mokae, Brad Sullivan, Reg Evans	
J U N E	13	Roadie	United Artists	Alan Rudolph (director/screenplay); Big Boy Medlin, Michael Ventura, Zalman King (screenplay); Meat Loaf, Kaki Hunter, Art Carney, Gailard Sartain, Don Cornelius, Rhonda Bates, Joe Spano, Allan Graf, Merle Kilgore, Ramblin' Jack Elliott, Alice Cooper, Blondie, Roy Orbison, Hank Williams Jr., Larry Lindsey, Marcy Hanson, Carole McClellan, Ray Benson, Joe Gannon, Jesse Frederick, Richard Marion, Sonny Davis, Alvin Crow and the Pleasant Valley Boys, Rick Crow and Asleep at the Wheel, Eric Gardner	
J U N E	13	Wholly Moses!	Columbia Pictures	Gary Weis (director); Guy Thomas (screenplay); Dudley Moore, Laraine Newman, James Coco, Paul Sand, Jack Gilford, Dom DeLuise, John Houseman, Madeline Kahn, David L. Lander, Richard Pryor, John Ritter, Richard B. Shull, Tanya Boyd, Ruth Manning, Walker Edmiston	
J U N E	19	Animalympics	NBC / Lisberger Studios	Steven Lisberger (director/screenplay); Michael Fremer (screenplay); Billy Crystal, Gilda Radner, Harry Shearer, Michael Fremer	
J U N E	19	Rough Cut	Paramount Pictures	Don Siegel (director); Larry Gelbart (screenplay); Burt Reynolds, Lesley-Anne Down, David Niven, Timothy West, Patrick Magee, Al Matthews, Susan Littler, Joss Ackland, Isabel Dean, Wolf Kahler, Andrew Ray, Julian Holloway, Douglas Wilmer, Geoffrey Russell, Ronald Hines, David Howey, Frank Mills, Roland Culver, Alan Webb, Cassandra Harris, Sue Lloyd, Cyril Appleton	
J U N E	20	The Blues Brothers	Universal Pictures	John Landis (director/screenplay); Dan Aykroyd (screenplay); John Belushi, Dan Aykroyd, James Brown, Cab Calloway, Ray Charles, Carrie Fisher, Aretha Franklin, Henry Gibson, John Candy, John Lee Hooker, Kathleen Freeman, Steve Lawrence, Twiggy, Frank Oz, Jeff Morris, Charles Napier, Steven Spielberg, Stephen Bishop, Steven Williams, Armand Cerami, John Landis, Joe Walsh, Ben Piazza, Cindy Fisher, Paul Reubens, Rosie Shuster, Chaka Khan, Gary McLarty, Pinetop Perkins, Mr. T, Carolyn Franklin, De'voreaux White, James Avery, Lou Berryman, Luis Contreras, Raven De La Croix, Ralph Foody, Leonard R. Garner Jr., Steve "The Colonel" Cropper, Donald "Duck" Dunn, Murphy Dunne, Willie "Too Big" Hall, Tom "Bones" Malone, "Blue Lou" Marini, Matt "Guitar" Murphy, "Mr. Fabulous" Alan Rubin	
J U N E	20	Brubaker	20th Century Fox	Stuart Rosenberg (director); W. D. Richter (screenplay); Robert Redford, Yaphet Kotto, Jane Alexander, Murray Hamilton, David Keith, Morgan Freeman, Matt Clark, Tim McIntire, Richard Ward, M. Emmet Walsh, Albert Salmi, Linda Haynes, Everett McGill, Val Avery, Ronald C. Frazier, David D. Harris, Joe Spinell, Wilford Brimley, Nathan George, William Newman, John McMartin, Nicolas Cage	
J U N E	20	Can't Stop the Music	Associated Film Distribution / EMI Films	Nancy Walker (director); Allan Carr, Bronte Woodard (screenplay); Steve Guttenberg, Valerie Perrine, Bruce Jenner, Paul Sand, Tammy Grimes, Village People, June Havoc, Barbara Rush, Altovise Davis, Marilyn Sokol, Russell Nype, Jack Weston, Leigh Taylor-Young, Dick Patterson	
J U N E	25	Herbie Goes Bananas	Walt Disney Productions / Buena Vista Distribution	Vincent McEveety (director); Don Tait (screenplay); Cloris Leachman, Charles Martin Smith, Stephan W. Burns, John Vernon, Elyssa Davalos, Joaquin Garay III, Harvey Korman, Richard Jaeckel, Alex Rocco, Fritz Feld, Vito Scotti, Jose Gonzales-Gonzales, Allan Hunt, Iris Adrian, Jack Perkins, Alma Beltran, Don Diamond, Buddy Joe Hooker, Steve Boyum, Ceil Cabot, Dante D'Andre, Jeff Ramsey	
J U N E	25	The Last Flight of Noah's Ark	Walt Disney Productions / Buena Vista Distribution	Charles Jarrott (director); Steven W. Carabatsos, Sandy Glass, George Arthur Bloom (screenplay); Elliott Gould, Geneviève Bujold, Ricky Schroder, Vincent Gardenia, Tammy Lauren, John Fujioka, Yuki Shimoda, Dana Elcar, John P. Ryan, Peter Renaday, Ruth Manning, Arthur Adams, Austin Willis, Bob Whiting	
J U N E	25	The Stunt Man	20th Century Fox / Melvin Simon Productions	Richard Rush (director/screenplay); Lawrence B. Marcus (screenplay); Peter O'Toole, Steve Railsback, Barbara Hershey, Allen Garfield, Alex Rocco, Sharon Farrell, Adam Roarke, Philip Bruns, Charles Bail, James Avery, Gregg Berger	

== July–September ==
Opening		Title	Production company	Cast and crew	Ref.
J U L Y	2	Airplane!	Paramount Pictures / Howard W. Koch Productions	Jim Abrahams, David Zucker, Jerry Zucker (directors/screenplay); Robert Hays, Julie Hagerty, Leslie Nielsen, Peter Graves, Lloyd Bridges, Robert Stack, Lorna Patterson, Stephen Stucker, Frank Ashmore, Jonathan Banks, Kareem Abdul-Jabbar, Barbara Billingsley, Lee Bryant, Nicholas Pryor, Joyce Bulifant, Maureen McGovern, Kenneth Tobey, Barbara Stuart, Rossie Harris, Al White, David Leisure, Jason Wingreen, Jill Whelan, Ethel Merman, Jimmie Walker, James Hong, Howard Jarvis, Michael Laurence, Craig Berenson, Marcy Goldman, Norman Alexander Gibbs, David Hollander, Michelle Stacy, Lee Terri	
J U L Y	2	Alligator	Group 1 Films	Lewis Teague (director); John Sayles (screenplay); Robert Forster, Robin Riker, Michael Gazzo, Dean Jagger, Sydney Lassick, Jack Carter, Perry Lang, Henry Silva, Bart Braverman, Royce D. Applegate, Jim Boeke, Peter Miller, Pat Petersen, Kendall Carly Browne, Micol, Angel Tompkins, Sue Lyon, Dick Richards, Michael Mazurki, Kane Hodder	
J U L Y	2	Jane Austen in Manhattan	Contemporary Films	James Ivory (director); Ruth Prawer Jhabvala (screenplay); Anne Baxter, Robert Powell, Michael Wager, Sean Young, Charles McCaughan, Tim Choate, John Guerrasio, Iman, Katrina Hodiak, Kurt Johnson, Philip Lenkowsky, Nancy New	
J U L Y	2	The Sea Wolves	Paramount Pictures / Rank Film Distributors	Andrew V. McLaglen (director); Reginald Rose (screenplay); Gregory Peck, Roger Moore, David Niven, Trevor Howard, Barbara Kellerman, Patrick Macnee, Kenneth Griffith, Patrick Allen, Wolf Kahler, Robert Hoffmann, Dan van Husen, George Mikell, Jürgen Andersen, Bernard Archard, Martin Benson, Faith Brook, Allan Cuthbertson, Edward Dentith, Clifford Earl, Rusi Ghandhi, Percy Herbert, Patrick Holt, Donald Houston, Glyn Houston, Victor Langley, Terence Longdon, Michael Medwin, W. Morgan Sheppard, John Standing, Graham Stark, Keith Stevenson, Jack Watson, Moray Watson, Brook Williams, Marc Zuber, Mohan Agashe	
J U L Y	5	The Blue Lagoon	Columbia Pictures	Randal Kleiser (director); Douglas Day Stewart (screenplay); Brooke Shields, Christopher Atkins, Leo McKern, William Daniels, Alan Hopgood, Gus Mercurio, Elva Josephson, Glenn Kohan, Bradley Pryce, Chad Timmermans	
J U L Y	11	How to Beat the High Cost of Living	American International Pictures	Robert Scheerer (director); Robert Kaufman, Leonora Thung (screenplay); Jane Curtin, Susan Saint James, Jessica Lange, Dabney Coleman, Richard Benjamin, Fred Willard, Eddie Albert, Cathryn Damon, Ronnie Schell, Michael Bell, Sybil Danning, Al Checco, Susan Tolsky, Art Metrano, Garrett Morris	
J U L Y	11	Oh! Heavenly Dog	20th Century Fox	Joe Camp (director/screenplay); Rod Browning (screenplay); Chevy Chase, Benji, Jane Seymour, Omar Sharif, Robert Morley, Stuart Germain, Alan Sues, John Stride, Donnelly Rhodes, Barbara Leigh-Hunt, Richard Vernon, Frank Williams, Susan Kellermann, Lorenzo Music, Harry Hill, Kay Tremblay, Albin Pahernik, Margierite Corriveau, Gerald Iles, Jérôme Tiberghien	
J U L Y	11	Used Cars	Columbia Pictures	Robert Zemeckis (director/screenplay); Bob Gale (screenplay); Kurt Russell, Jack Warden, Gerrit Graham, Deborah Harmon, Frank McRae, Joe Flaherty, David L. Lander, Michael McKean, Michael Talbott, Harry Northup, Alfonso Arau, Cheryl Rixon, Al Lewis, Woodrow Parfrey, Dub Taylor, Wendie Jo Sperber, Marc McClure, Betty Thomas, Dick Miller, Rita Taggart, Terence Knox, Will McMillan	
J U L Y	18	The Big Red One	United Artists / Lorimar	Samuel Fuller (director/screenplay); Lee Marvin, Mark Hamill, Robert Carradine, Bobby Di Cicco, Kelly Ward, Siegfried Rauch, Stéphane Audran, Marthe Villalonga, Perry Lang, Matteo Zoffoli	
J U L Y	18	Cheech & Chong's Next Movie	Universal Pictures	Tommy Chong (director/screenplay); Cheech Marin (screenplay); Cheech Marin, Tommy Chong, Evelyn Guerrero, Edie McClurg, Paul Reubens, Betty Kennedy, Sy Kramer, Rikki Marin, Bob McClurg, John Paragon, Jake Steinfeld, Cassandra Peterson, Rita Wilson, Michael Winslow, John Steadman, Faith Minton, Ben Powers, Carl Weintraub, Lupe M. Ontiveros	
J U L Y	18	Honeysuckle Rose	Warner Bros.	Jerry Schatzberg (director); John Binder, Gustaf Molander, Carol Sobieski, Gösta Stevens, William D. Wittliff (screenplay); Willie Nelson, Dyan Cannon, Amy Irving, Slim Pickens, Joey Floyd, Charles Levin, Mickey Rooney Jr., Lane Smith, Pepe Serna, Priscilla Pointer, Diana Scarwid, Jeannie Seely, Emmylou Harris, Mickey Raphael, Grady Martin, Rex Ludwick, Bee Spears	
J U L Y	18	The Little Dragons	Aurora Film Corporation / Eastwind Productions	Curtis Hanson (director); Harvey Applebaum, Louis G. Atlee, Rudolph Borchert, Alan Ormsby (screenplay); Charles Lane, Ann Sothern, Chris Peterson, Pat Petersen, Sally Boyden, Rick Lenz, Sharon Clark, Joe Spinell, John Davis Chandler, Clifford A. Pellow, Stephen Young, Pat E. Johnson, Bong Soo Han, Tony Bill, Spencer Quinn, Topo Swope, Jim Sherwood	
J U L Y	18	Prom Night	AVCO Embassy Pictures	Paul Lynch (director); William Gray (screenplay); Jamie Lee Curtis, Leslie Nielsen, Casey Stevens, Eddie Benton, Michael Tough, Robert A. Silverman, Pita Oliver, David Mucci, Mary Beth Rubens, George Touliatos, Melanie Morse, David Bolt, Jeff Wincott, David Gardner, Joy Thompson, Sheldon Rybowski, Antoinette Bower	
J U L Y	24	The Earthling	Filmways Pictures	Peter Collinson (director); Lanny Cotler (screenplay); William Holden, Ricky Schroder	
J U L Y	25	Caddyshack	Orion Pictures	Harold Ramis (director/screenplay); Douglas Kenney, Brian Doyle-Murray (screenplay); Chevy Chase, Rodney Dangerfield, Ted Knight, Michael O'Keefe, Bill Murray, Sarah Holcomb, Scott Colomby, Cindy Morgan, Dan Resin, Henry Wilcoxon, Elaine Aiken, Albert Salmi, Ann Ryerson, Brian Doyle-Murray, Hamilton Mitchell, Peter Berkrot, John F. Barmon Jr., Lois Kibbee, Brian McConnachie, Scott Powell, Jackie Davis, Thomas A. Carlin, Mel Pape	
J U L Y	25	Dressed to Kill	Filmways Pictures	Brian De Palma (director/screenplay); Michael Caine, Angie Dickinson, Nancy Allen, Keith Gordon, Dennis Franz, David Margulies, Brandon Maggart, William Finley, Ken Baker, Susanna Clemm	
J U L Y	25	Middle Age Crazy	20th Century Fox / Krofft Entertainment / Canadian Film Development Corporation / Guardian Trust Company / Tormont Films	John Trent (director); Carl Kleinschmitt, Jerry Lee Lewis (screenplay); Bruce Dern, Ann-Margret, Graham Jarvis, Deborah Wakeham, Eric Christmas, Helen Hughes, Geoffrey Bowes, Patricia Hamilton, Michael Kane, Diane Dewey, Vivian Reis, Anni Lantuch, Gina Dick, John Facenda	
A U G U S T	1	The Final Countdown	United Artists / The Bryna Company	Don Taylor (director); David Ambrose, Gerry Davis, Thomas Hunter, Peter Powell (screenplay); Kirk Douglas, Martin Sheen, Katharine Ross, James Farentino, Ron O'Neal, Charles Durning, Victor Mohica, James C. Lawrence, Soon-Tek Oh, Joe Lowry, Alvin Ing, Mark Thomas, Harold Bergman, Richard Liberty, Lloyd Kaufman, Dan Fitzgerald, Peter Douglas	
A U G U S T	1	The Hunter	Paramount Pictures / Rastar	Buzz Kulik (director); Ted Leighton, Peter Hyams (screenplay); Steve McQueen, Eli Wallach, Kathryn Harrold, LeVar Burton, Ben Johnson, Richard Venture, Tracey Walter, Thomas Rosales Jr., Theodore Wilson	
A U G U S T	1	I Go Pogo	Fotomat	Marc Paul Chinoy (director); Skip Hinnant, Ruth Buzzi, Stan Freberg, Arnold Stang, Jonathan Winters, Jimmy Breslin, Vincent Price	
A U G U S T	1	Loose Shoes	National American Films / Brooksfilms	Ira Miller (director/screenplay); Royce D. Applegate, Dan Praiser, Charley Smith (screenplay); Royce D. Applegate, Bill Murray, Lewis Arquette, Howard Hesseman, Susan Tyrrell, Ed Lauter, Tom Baker, Buddy Hackett, Sean Frye, Sandy Helberg, Rod McCary, Sid Haig, Larry Hankin, David Downing, Kinky Friedman, Dan McBride, Brad Ashcraft, Dustin Day, Alexander Stowe	
A U G U S T	1	Raise the Titanic	Associated Film Distribution / ITC Entertainment	Jerry Jameson (director); Adam Kennedy (screenplay); Jason Robards, Richard Jordan, David Selby, Anne Archer, Dirk Blocker, Alec Guinness, Bo Brundin, M. Emmet Walsh, J. D. Cannon, Norman Bartold, Elya Baskin, Robert Broyles, Paul Carr, Michael C. Gwynne, Harvey Lewis	
A U G U S T	8	The Fiendish Plot of Dr. Fu Manchu	Orion Pictures / Braun Entertainment Group / Playboy Productions	Piers Haggard (director); Rudy Dochtermann, Jim Moloney, Peter Sellers (screenplay); Peter Sellers, Helen Mirren, David Tomlinson, Sid Caesar, Simon Williams, Steve Franken, Stratford Johns, John Le Mesurier, John Sharp, Clive Dunn, Clément Harari, Burt Kwouk, Kwan-Young Lee, John Tan, Philip Tan, Serge Julien, Johns Rajohnson, Katia Tchenko	
A U G U S T	8	Xanadu	Universal Pictures	Robert Greenwald (director); Richard Christian Danus, Marc Reid Rubel (screenplay); Olivia Newton-John, Gene Kelly, Michael Beck, Matt Lattanzi, James Sloyan, Dimitra Arliss, Katie Hanley, Fred McCarren, Ren Woods, Melvin Jones, Ira Newborn, Jo Ann Harris, Wilfrid Hyde-White, Coral Browne, Darcel Wynne, Adolfo "Shabba-Doo" Quinones, Miranda Garrison, Sandahl Bergman, Lynne Latham, John "Fee" Waybill, Prairie Prince, Bill Spooner, Vince Welnick, Deborah Jennsen, Alexander Cole, Melinda Phelps, Cherise Bate, Juliette Marshall, Marilyn Tokuda, Yvette Van Voorhees, Teri Beckerman, Rick Anderson, Michael Cotten, Roger Steen, Re Styles	
A U G U S T	10	Why Would I Lie?	United Artists	Larry Peerce (director); Peter Stone (screenplay); Treat Williams, Lisa Eichhorn, Gabriel Macht, Susan Heldfond, Anne Byrne, Valerie Curtin, Jocelyn Brando, Nicolas Coster, Severn Darden, Sonny Davis, Mitzi Hoag, Ilene Kristen, Jan D'Arcy, Jane Burkett, Kay Cummings, Mia Bendixsen, Harriet Gibson, Cynthia Hoppenfeld, Natalie Core, Shirley Slater, Marian Gants	
A U G U S T	15	The Kidnapping of the President	Crown International Pictures	George Mendeluk (director); Richard Murphy, Charles Templeton (screenplay); William Shatner, Hal Holbrook, Van Johnson, Ava Gardner, Miguel Fernandes, Cindy Girling, Elizabeth Shepherd, Michael J. Reynolds, Gary Reineke, Maury Chaykin, Murray Westgate, Ken Anderson, Sully Boyar, Aubert Pallascio, Virginia Podesser	
A U G U S T	15	Smokey and the Bandit II	Universal Pictures / Rastar	Hal Needham (director); Jerry Belson, Brock Yates (screenplay); Burt Reynolds, Sally Field, Jackie Gleason, Jerry Reed, Dom DeLuise, Paul Williams, Pat McCormick, David Huddleston, Mike Henry, John Anderson, Brenda Lee, The Statler Brothers, "Mean Joe" Greene, Mel Tillis, Joe Klecko, Don Williams, Terry Bradshaw, Nancy Lenehan, John Megna, Chuck Yeager, John Robert Nicholson	
A U G U S T	15	Those Lips, Those Eyes	United Artists	Michael Pressman (director); David Shaber (screenplay); Frank Langella, Glynnis O'Connor, Tom Hulce, Jerry Stiller, Herbert Berghof, Kevin McCarthy, Joseph Maher, George Morfogen	
A U G U S T	15	Willie & Phil	20th Century Fox	Paul Mazursky (director/screenplay); Michael Ontkean, Margot Kidder, Ray Sharkey, Jan Miner, Tom Brennan, Julie Bovasso, Louis Guss, Kathleen Maguire, Kaki Hunter, Kristine DeBell, Jerry Hall	
A U G U S T	22	The Octagon	American Cinema Releasing / American Cinema Productions	Eric Karson (director); Leigh Chapman (screenplay); Chuck Norris, Karen Carlson, Lee Van Cleef, Tadashi Yamashita, Carol Bagdasarian, Richard Norton, Art Hindle, Kim Lankford, Kurt Grayson, Yuki Shimoda, Jack Carter, Ernie Hudson, Larry D. Mann, Aaron Norris, John Fujioka, Michael Norris, Brian Tochi	
A U G U S T	29	He Knows You're Alone	United Artists	Armand Mastroianni (director); Scott Parker (screenplay); Caitlin O'Heaney, Don Scardino, Elizabeth Kemp, Tom Rolfing, Lewis Arlt, Patsy Pease, James Rebhorn, Dana Barron, Tom Hanks, Paul Gleason, James Carroll, Russell Todd	
A U G U S T	29	McVicar	Crown International Pictures / The Who Films / Polytel	Tom Clegg (director/screenplay); John McVicar (screenplay); Roger Daltrey, Adam Faith, Cheryl Campbell, Billy Murray, Georgina Hale, Steven Berkoff, Brian Hall, Matthew Scurfield, Harry Fielder, Ian Hendry, Malcolm Tierney, Robert Walker Jr., James Marcus, Tony Haygarth, Anthony May, Peter Jonfield, Leonard Gregory, Joe Turner, Jeremy Blake, Anthony Trent, Terence Stuart, Charles Cork, Paul Kember, Ronald Herdman, Tony Rohr, Michael Feast, Richard Simpson, Ricky Parkinson	
S E P T E M B E R	8	Battle Beyond the Stars	New World Pictures	Jimmy T. Murakami (director); John Sayles (screenplay); Richard Thomas, Robert Vaughn, George Peppard, John Saxon, Sybil Danning, Darlanne Fluegel, Sam Jaffe, Jeff Corey, Morgan Woodward, Marta Kristen, Earl Boen, Lynn Carlin, Lara Cody, Julia Duffy, John Gowens, Larry Meyers, Steve Davis	
S E P T E M B E R	8	Return of the Secaucus 7	Libra Films / Salsipuedes Productions	John Sayles (director/screenplay); Bruce MacDonald, Maggie Renzi, David Strathairn, Adam LeFevre, Maggie Cousineau, Gordon Clapp, Jean Passanante, Karen Trott, Mark Arnott, John Sayles, Marisa Smith, Amy Schewel, Carolyn Brooks, Eric Forsythe, Nancy Mette	
S E P T E M B E R	9	Phobia	Paramount Pictures	John Huston (director); Peter Bellwood, Lew Lehman, Jimmy Sangster (screenplay); Paul Michael Glaser, Susan Hogan, John Colicos, David Eisner, Lisa Langlois, Alexandra Stewart, Kenneth Welsh, David Bolt, Patricia Collins, Robert O'Ree, Neil Vipond, Marian Waldman	
S E P T E M B E R	10	The Big Brawl	Warner Bros. / Golden Harvest	Robert Clouse (director/screenplay); Jackie Chan, José Ferrer, Kristine DeBell, Mako, Ron Max, David Sheiner, Rosalind Chao, Lenny Montana, Pat E. Johnson, Hard Boiled Haggerty, Chao-Li Chi, Jocelyn Lew, Peter Marc, Gene LeBell, Larry Drake	
S E P T E M B E R	10	The Gods Must Be Crazy	20th Century Fox	Jamie Uys (director/screenplay); N!xau, Marius Weyers, Sandra Prinsloo, Nic de Jager, Ken Gampu, Brian O'Shaughnessy, Pip Freedman, Jamie Uys, Michael Thys, Louw Verwey, Simon Sabela, Fanyana Sidumo, Joe Seakatsie	
S E P T E M B E R	15	James Clavell's Shōgun	NBC / Paramount Television	Jerry London (director); Eric Bercovici (screenplay); Richard Chamberlain, Toshiro Mifune, Yoko Shimada, Damien Thomas, John Rhys-Davies, Frankie Sakai, Alan Badel, Michael Hordern, Vladek Sheybal, George Innes, Leon Lissek, Yūki Meguro, Hideo Takamatsu, Nobuo Kaneko, Toru Abe, Masashi Ebara, Neil McCarthy, Seiji Miyaguchi, Yosuke Natsuki, Masumi Okada, Edward Peel, Eric Richard, W. Morgan Sheppard, Miiko Taka, Rinichi Yamamoto, Orson Welles, Hiromi Senno, John J. Carney, Hyoei Enoki, Hiroshi Hasegawa, Ian Jentle, Yuko Kada, Mika Kitagawa, Yoshie Kitsuda, Stewart MacKenzie, Ai Matsubara, Yumiko Morishita, Takeshi Obayashi, Atsuko Sano, Setsuko Sekine, Akira Sera, Shin Takuma, Midori Takei, Steve Ubels, Shizuko Azuma	
S E P T E M B E R	19	The Exterminator	Amsell Entertainment / AVCO Embassy Pictures / Shapiro-Glickenhaus Entertainment / Interstar Pictures	James Glickenhaus (director/screenplay); Robert Ginty, Samantha Eggar, Christopher George, Steve James, George Lee Cheung, Toni Di Benedetto, Dick Boccelli, Patrick Farrelly, Michele Harrell, David Lipman, Tom Everett, Ned Eisenberg, Irwin Keyes, Cindy Wilks, Dennis Boutsikaris, Mark Buntzman, Tony Munafo, Roger Grimsby, Judy Licht, Stan Getz, Samuel L. Jackson	
S E P T E M B E R	19	Melvin and Howard	Universal Pictures	Jonathan Demme (director); Bo Goldman (screenplay); Paul Le Mat, Mary Steenburgen, Pamela Reed, Jason Robards, Michael J. Pollard, Jack Kehoe, Rick Lenz, Dabney Coleman, Charles Napier, Melvin Dummar	
S E P T E M B E R	19	Ordinary People	Paramount Pictures / Wildwood Enterprises, Inc.	Robert Redford (director); Alvin Sargent (screenplay); Donald Sutherland, Mary Tyler Moore, Judd Hirsch, Timothy Hutton, Elizabeth McGovern, M. Emmet Walsh, Dinah Manoff, Fredric Lehne, James B. Sikking, Basil Hoffman, Quinn Redeker, Mariclare Costello, Meg Mundy, Elizabeth Hubbard, Adam Baldwin, Richard Whiting, Tim Clarke, Scott Doebler	
S E P T E M B E R	19	Super Fuzz	Columbia / AVCO Embassy / El Pico S.A. / Trans Cinema TV	Sergio Corbucci (director/screenplay); Sabatino Ciuffini (screenplay); Terence Hill, Ernest Borgnine, Joanne Dru, Marc Lawrence, Julie Gordon, Lee Sandman, Sal Borghese, Woody Woodbury	
S E P T E M B E R	26	Divine Madness	Warner Bros.	Michael Ritchie (director); Jerry Blatt, Bette Midler, Bruce Vilanch (screenplay); Bette Midler	
S E P T E M B E R	26	Hopscotch	AVCO Embassy Pictures	Ronald Neame (director); Bryan Forbes, Brian Garfield (screenplay); Walter Matthau, Glenda Jackson, Sam Waterston, Ned Beatty, Herbert Lom, George Baker, Ivor Roberts, Lucy Saroyan, Severn Darden, George Pravda, Mike Gwilym, John Bennett Perry, David Matthau, Terry Beaver, Ray Charleson, Jacquelyn Hyde	
S E P T E M B E R	26	In God We Tru$t	Universal Pictures	Marty Feldman (director/screenplay); Chris Allen (screenplay); Marty Feldman, Andy Kaufman, Louise Lasser, Peter Boyle, Richard Pryor, Wilfrid Hyde-White, Severn Darden	
S E P T E M B E R	26	My Bodyguard	20th Century Fox / Melvin Simon Productions	Tony Bill (director); Alan Ormsby (screenplay); Chris Makepeace, Adam Baldwin, Matt Dillon, Martin Mull, Ruth Gordon, John Houseman, Craig Richard Nelson, Kathryn Grody, Joan Cusack, George Wendt, Jennifer Beals, Richard Bradley, Tim Reyna, Dean R. Miller, Hank Salas	
S E P T E M B E R	26	Resurrection	Universal Pictures	Daniel Petrie (director); Lewis John Carlino (screenplay); Ellen Burstyn, Sam Shepard, Richard Farnsworth, Roberts Blossom, Clifford David, Pamela Payton-Wright, Jeffrey DeMunn, Eva Le Gallienne, Lois Smith, Richard Hamilton, Sylvia Walden, Madeleine Thornton-Sherwood	
S E P T E M B E R	26	Stardust Memories	United Artists	Woody Allen (director/screenplay); Woody Allen, Charlotte Rampling, Jessica Harper, Marie-Christine Barrault, Tony Roberts, Daniel Stern, Amy Wright, Helen Hanft, John Rothman, Anne De Salvo, Leonardo Cimino, Sharon Stone, Jack Rollins, Judith Roberts, Candy Loving, Brent Spiner, Judith Crist, Irwin Keyes, Bonnie Hellman, Cynthia Gibb, Annie Korzen, Largo Woodruff, James Otis, Alice Spivak, Armin Shimerman, Laraine Newman, Louise Lasser, Joe Wilder, Hank Jones, Richie Pratt, Arvell Shaw, Earl Shendell, William Zinsser	
S E P T E M B E R	26	Without Warning	Filmways Pictures / World Amusement Partnership	Greydon Clark (director); Lyn Freeman, Daniel Grodnik, Ben Nett, Steve Mathis (screenplay); Jack Palance, Martin Landau, Tarah Nutter, Christopher S. Nelson, Cameron Mitchell, Neville Brand, Ralph Meeker, Darby Hinton, David Caruso, Lynn Thell, Sue Ane Langdon, Larry Storch, Kevin Peter Hall	

== October–December ==
Opening		Title	Production company	Cast and crew	Ref.
O C T O B E R	3	Coast to Coast	Paramount Pictures	Joseph Sargent (director); Stanley Weiser (screenplay); Dyan Cannon, Robert Blake, Quinn Redeker, Michael Lerner, Maxine Stuart, William Lucking, Rozelle Gayle, George P. Wilbur, Darwin Joston, Dick Durock, Cassandra Peterson, Karen Montgomery, Vicki Frederick, John Roselius	
O C T O B E R	3	The First Deadly Sin	Filmways Pictures	Brian G. Hutton (director); Mann Rubin (screenplay); Frank Sinatra, Faye Dunaway, James Whitmore, David Dukes, Brenda Vaccaro, Martin Gabel, Anthony Zerbe, George Coe, Joe Spinell, Jeffrey DeMunn, Bruce Willis	
O C T O B E R	3	Gloria	Columbia Pictures	John Cassavetes (director/screenplay); Gena Rowlands, Julie Carmen, Buck Henry, John Adames, Lupe Garnica, John Finnegan, Tom Noonan, J.C. Quinn, Sonny Landham, Lawrence Tierney	
O C T O B E R	3	The Man with Bogart's Face	20th Century Fox / Melvin Simon Productions	Robert Day (director); Andrew J. Fenady (screenplay); Robert Sacchi, Franco Nero, Michelle Phillips, Olivia Hussey, Misty Rowe, Victor Buono, Sybil Danning, Herbert Lom, Richard Bakalyan, Gregg Palmer, Jay Robinson, George Raft, Yvonne De Carlo, Mike Mazurki, Henry Wilcoxon, Victor Sen Yung	
O C T O B E R	3	Oh, God! Book II	Warner Bros.	Gilbert Cates (director); Josh Greenfeld, Hal Goldman, Fred S. Fox, Seaman Jacobs, Melissa Miller (screenplay); George Burns, Suzanne Pleshette, David Birney, Louanne Sirota, John Louie, Wilfrid Hyde-White, Conrad Janis, Hans Conried	
O C T O B E R	3	One-Trick Pony	Warner Bros.	Robert M. Young (director); Paul Simon (screenplay); Paul Simon, Blair Brown, Rip Torn, Joan Hackett, Allen Garfield, Mare Winningham, Michael Pearlman, Lou Reed, Steve Gadd, Eric Gale, Tony Levin, Richard Tee, Harry Shearer, Daniel Stern, Sam & Dave, The Lovin' Spoonful, Tiny Tim, The B-52's, David Sanborn	
O C T O B E R	3	Somewhere in Time	Universal Pictures / Rastar	Jeannot Szwarc (director); Richard Matheson (screenplay); Christopher Reeve, Jane Seymour, Christopher Plummer, Teresa Wright, Bill Irwin, George Voskovec, Susan French, John Alvin, Eddra Gale, Tim Kazurinsky, Richard Matheson, William H. Macy, Sean Hayden, Ali Matheson	
O C T O B E R	3	Terror Train	20th Century Fox / Astral Bellevue Pathe / Sandy Howard Productions / Triple T Productions	Roger Spottiswoode (director); T.Y. Drake (screenplay); Jamie Lee Curtis, Ben Johnson, Hart Bochner, Timothy Webber, Anthony Sherwood, Joy Boushel, D.D. Winters, Howard Busgang, David Copperfield, Sandee Currie, Derek MacKinnon, Elizabeth Cholette, Don Lamoreux, Steve Michaels, Charles Biddle Sr., Thom Haverstock, Greg Swanson	
O C T O B E R	10	The Elephant Man	Paramount Pictures	David Lynch (director/screenplay); Christopher De Vore, Eric Bergren (screenplay); Anthony Hopkins, John Hurt, Anne Bancroft, John Gielgud, Wendy Hiller, Hannah Gordon, Freddie Jones, Michael Elphick, Dexter Fletcher, Helen Ryan, John Standing, Lesley Dunlop, Phoebe Nicholls, W. Morgan Sheppard, Kenny Baker, Pat Gorman, Pauline Quirke, Nula Conwell	
O C T O B E R	10	It's My Turn	Columbia Pictures / Rastar	Claudia Weill (director); Eleanor Bergstein (screenplay); Jill Clayburgh, Michael Douglas, Charles Grodin, Beverly Garland, Steven Hill, Jennifer Salt, Dianne Wiest, Daniel Stern	
O C T O B E R	10	Kagemusha	20th Century Fox / Toho	Akira Kurosawa (director/screenplay); Masato Ide (screenplay); Tatsuya Nakadai, Tsutomu Yamazaki, Kenichi Hagiwara, Jinpachi Nezu, Hideji Ōtaki, Daisuke Ryu, Masayuki Yui, Kaori Momoi, Mitsuko Baisho, Hideo Murota, Takayuki Shiho, Kōji Shimizu, Takashi Shimura, Kamatari Fujiwara, Noburo Shimizu, Sen Yamamoto, Shuhei Sugimori, Elichi Kanakubo, Francis Selleck	
O C T O B E R	10	Private Benjamin	Warner Bros.	Howard Zieff (director); Nancy Meyers, Charles Shyer, Harvey Miller (screenplay); Goldie Hawn, Eileen Brennan, Armand Assante, Robert Webber, Richard Herd, Sam Wanamaker, Barbara Barrie, Gretchen Wyler, Mary Kay Place, Harry Dean Stanton, Hal Williams, P. J. Soles, Craig T. Nelson, Albert Brooks, Alan Oppenheimer, Toni Kalem, Damita Jo Freeman, Alston Ahern, Lee Wallace, Danny Wells	
O C T O B E R	10	Song of the South (re-release)	Walt Disney Productions / RKO Radio Pictures	Harve Foster, Wilfred Jackson (directors); Morton Grant, Maurice Rapf, Dalton S. Reymond, Bill Peet, George Stallings, Ralph Wright (screenplay); James Baskett, Bobby Driscoll, Luana Patten, Glenn Leedy, Ruth Warrick, Hattie McDaniel, Lucile Watson, Mary Field, Johnny Lee, Nick Stewart, Roy Glenn, Clarence Nash, Erik Rolf, Olivier Urbain, Georgie Nokes, Gene Holland, Helen Crozier, Anita Brown	
O C T O B E R	14	Fade to Black	Compass International Pictures / American Cinema Releasing	Vernon Zimmerman (director/screenplay); Dennis Christopher, Tim Thomerson, Norman Burton, Morgan Paull, Gwynne Gilford, Eve Brent Ashe, James Luisi, Linda Kerridge, John Steadman, Mickey Rourke, Peter Horton, Melinda O. Fee, Marcie Barkin	
O C T O B E R	17	Foolin' Around	Columbia Pictures / GCC Productions	Richard T. Heffron (director); Michael Kane, David Swift (screenplay); Gary Busey, Annette O'Toole, Eddie Albert, Tony Randall, Cloris Leachman, Michael Talbott, John Calvin, William H. Macy	
O C T O B E R	17	Schizoid	Cannon Group / Golan-Globus Productions	David Paulsen (director/screenplay); Klaus Kinski, Marianna Hill, Craig Wasson, Donna Wilkes, Christopher Lloyd, Richard Herd, Joe Regalbuto, Flo Gerrish, Kiva Lawrence	
O C T O B E R	17	Times Square	Associated Film Distribution / EMI Films / Robert Stigwood Organisation	Allan Moyle (director); Jacob Brackman (screenplay); Tim Curry, Trini Alvarado, Robin Johnson, Peter Coffield, Herbert Berghof, David Margulies, Anna Maria Horsford, Michael Margotta, J.C. Quinn, Tim Choate, Elizabeth Peña, Steve James, Jay Acovone	
O C T O B E R	18	Motel Hell	United Artists	Kevin Connor (director); Robert Jaffe, Steven-Charles Jaffe (screenplay); Rory Calhoun, Paul Linke, Nancy Parsons, Nina Axelrod, Wolfman Jack, Elaine Joyce, Monique St. Pierre, Rosanne Katon, John Ratzenberger, Dick Curtis, E. Hampton Beagle, Everett Creach, Michael Melvin, Victoria Hartman, Gwil Richards, Toni Gillman, Marc Silver, Shaylin Hendrixson, Heather Hendrixson	
O C T O B E R	24	Loving Couples	20th Century Fox / Time-Life Films	Jack Smight (director); Martin Donovan (screenplay); Shirley MacLaine, James Coburn, Susan Sarandon, Stephen Collins, Sally Kellerman, Nan Martin, Anne Bloom, Helena Carroll, Marilyn Chris, Pat Corley, Michael Currie, John de Lancie, Peter Hobbs, Sam Weisman	
O C T O B E R	31	The Awakening	Orion Pictures / EMI Films	Mike Newell (director); Chris Bryant, Allan Scott, Clive Exton (screenplay); Charlton Heston, Susannah York, Jill Townsend, Stephanie Zimbalist, Patrick Drury, Bruce Myers, Nadim Sawalha, Ian McDiarmid, Ahmed Osman, Miriam Margoyles, Michael Mellinger, Leonard Maguire, Ishia Bennison, Madhav Sharma, Chris Fairbanks, Michael Halphie	
O C T O B E R	31	Borderline	Associated Film Distribution / ITC Entertainment / Marble Arch Productions	Jerrold Freedman (director/screenplay); Steve Kline (screenplay); Charles Bronson, Ed Harris, Bruno Kirby, Wilford Brimley, Michael Lerner, Bert Remsen, Kenneth McMillan, Karmin Murcelo, Norman Alden, John Ashton, Charles Cyphers, Enrique Castillo	
O C T O B E R	31	Sunday Lovers	United Artists / Metro-Goldwyn-Mayer	Bryan Forbes, Édouard Molinaro, Gene Wilder, Dino Risi (directors); Leslie Bricusse, Agenore Incrocci, Furio Scarpelli, Francis Veber, Gene Wilder (screenplay); Gene Wilder, Roger Moore, Kathleen Quinlan, Lino Ventura, Ugo Tognazzi, Priscilla Barnes, Lynn Redgrave, Liù Bosisio, Denholm Elliott, Sylva Koscina, Beba Lončar, Rossana Podestà, Milena Vukotic, Robert Webber, Madeleine Barbulée, Lory Del Santo, Luis Ávalos, Catherine Spaak, Francesco D'Adda, Catherine Salviat, George Hillsden, Adelita Requena, Tommy Duggan, Pierre Douglas, Michèle Montel, Gino Da Ronch, Gianfilippo Carcano, Vittorio Zarfati, María Teresa Lombardo, Dianne Crittenden, Randolph Dobbs	
O C T O B E R	31	Touched by Love	Columbia Pictures / Rastar	Gus Trikonis (director); Hesper Anderson (screenplay); Diane Lane, Deborah Raffin, Michael Learned, John Amos, Cristina Raines, Mary Wickes, Clu Gulager	
O C T O B E R	31	Witches' Brew	United Artists	Richard Shorr (director/screenplay); Syd Dutton (screenplay); Teri Garr, Richard Benjamin, Lana Turner, Kathryn Leigh Scott, Jordan Charney, Angus Scrimm, James Winkler, Bill Sorrells, Kelly Jean Peters, Nathan Roth, Bonnie Gondel	
N O V E M B E R	3	The Long Good Friday	Paramount Pictures / Black Lion Films / HandMade Films / Calendar Productions	John Mackenzie (director); Barrie Keeffe (screenplay); Bob Hoskins, Helen Mirren, Bryan Marshall, Derek Thompson, Eddie Constantine, Dave King, P. H. Moriarty, Paul Freeman, Stephen Davies, Brian Hall, Paul Barber, Pauline Melville, Nigel Humphreys, Karl Howman, Gillian Taylforth, Dexter Fletcher, Pierce Brosnan, Daragh O'Malley, Kevin McNally	
N O V E M B E R	7	The Boogeyman	Jerry Gross Organization	Ulli Lommel (director/screenplay); Suzanna Love, John Carradine, Ron James, Nicholas Love, Raymond Boyden	
N O V E M B E R	7	Christmas Evil	Pan American Pictures / Edward R. Pressman Film	Lewis Jackson (director/screenplay); Brandon Maggart, Jeffrey DeMunn, Dianne Hull, Andy Fenwick, Mark Chamberlin, Peter Friedman, Patricia Richardson, Mark Margolis, Rutanya Alda, Joe Jamrog, Peter Neuman, Scott McKay, Gus Salud, Wally Moran, Burt Kleiner	
N O V E M B E R	11	Shogun Assassin	New World Pictures / Katsu	Robert Houston (director/screenplay); David Weisman, Kazuo Koike (screenplay); Tomisaburo Wakayama, Kayo Matsuo, Akiji Kobayashi, Shin Kishida, Taketoshi Naito, Akihiro Tomikawa, Reiko Kasahara, Minoru Ooki, Shougen Nitta, Tokio Ooki	
N O V E M B E R	14	The Idolmaker	United Artists	Taylor Hackford (director); Edward di Lorenzo (screenplay); Ray Sharkey, Peter Gallagher, Joe Pantoliano, Tovah Feldshuh, Paul Land, Maureen McCormick, Olympia Dukakis, John Aprea	
N O V E M B E R	14	Raging Bull	United Artists	Martin Scorsese (director); Paul Schrader, Mardik Martin (screenplay); Robert De Niro, Joe Pesci, Cathy Moriarty, Nicholas Colasanto, Theresa Saldana, Frank Vincent, Lori Anne Flax, Mario Gallo, Frank Adonis, Joseph Bono, Frank Topham, Charles Scorsese, Geraldine Smith, Candy Moore, James V. Christy, Peter Savage, Don Dunphy, McKenzie Westmore, Gene LeBell, Shay Duffin, Martin Scorsese, John Turturro, Coley Wallace, Johnny Barnes, Bill Hanrahan, Kevin Mahon, Eddie Mustafa Muhammad, Floyd Anderson, Johnny Turner, Louis Raftis	
N O V E M B E R	19	Heaven's Gate	United Artists / Partisan Productions	Michael Cimino (director/screenplay); Kris Kristofferson, Christopher Walken, John Hurt, Sam Waterston, Brad Dourif, Isabelle Huppert, Jeff Bridges, Joseph Cotten, Geoffrey Lewis, Paul Koslo, Richard Masur, Ronnie Hawkins, Terry O'Quinn, Tom Noonan, Mickey Rourke, Willem Dafoe, Roseanne Vela, Nicholas Woodeson	
N O V E M B E R	21	The Apple	The Cannon Group / NF Geria II / Filmgesellschaft mbH	Menahem Golan (director/screenplay); Catherine Mary Stewart, Allan Love, Grace Kennedy, George Gilmour, Joss Ackland, Vladek Sheybal, Ray Shell, Miriam Margoyles, Derek Deadman, George S. Clinton, Finola Hughes, Femi Taylor, John Chester, Michael Logan, Francesca Poston, Leslie Meadows, Gunter Notthoff, Clem Davies, Coby Recht, Iris Recht	
N O V E M B E R	21	Babylon	Kino Lorber Repertory / Seventy-Seven / National Film Finance Corporation	Franco Rosso (director/screenplay); Martin Stellman (screenplay); Brinsley Forde, Karl Howman, Trevor Laird, T-Bone Wilson, Mel Smith, Stefan Kalipha, Mark Monero, Alan Igbon, King Sounds, Maggie Steed, Mikey Campbell, Angus Zeb, David Gant, Gary Whelan, Vilma Hollingbery, Jah Shaka, Brian Bovell, Victor Romero Evans, David N. Haynes, Archie Pool, Beverly Michaels, Beverley Dublin, Granville Garner, David Cunningham, Cosmo Laidlaw, Yvonne Agard, Donovan Platt, Anthony Trent, Patrick Worrall, Malcolm Frederick, Cynthia Powell, Ann Duncan	
N O V E M B E R	21	The Visitor	American International Pictures / The International Picture Show Company / Brouwersgracht Investments / Film Ventures International / Swan American Film	Giulio Paradisi (director); Luciano Comici, Robert Mundi (screenplay); John Huston, Mel Ferrer, Glenn Ford, Lance Henriksen, Shelley Winters, Joanne Nail, Sam Peckinpah, Paige Conner, Neal Boortz, Steve Somers, Kareem Abdul-Jabbar, Franco Nero	
N O V E M B E R	26	Rockshow	Miramax Films / MPL Communications	Paul McCartney, Linda McCartney, Denny Laine, Jimmy McCulloch, Joe English	
D E C E M B E R	1	A Change of Seasons	20th Century Fox / Film Finance Group / Polyc International BV	Richard Lang (director); Erich Segal, Martin Ransohoff, Ronni Kern, Fred Segal (screenplay); Shirley MacLaine, Anthony Hopkins, Bo Derek, Michael Brandon, Mary Beth Hurt, Edward Winter, K Callan, Rod Colbin, Steve Eastin, Billy Beck, Karen Philipp, Paul Bryar	
D E C E M B E R	3	The Competition	Columbia Pictures / Rastar Films	Joel Oliansky (director/screenplay); Richard Dreyfuss, Amy Irving, Lee Remick, Sam Wanamaker, Joseph Cali, Gloria Stroock, Priscilla Pointer, James B. Sikking, Ty Henderson, Vicki Kriegler, Adam Stern, Bea Silvern, Philip Sterling, Delia Salvi	
D E C E M B E R	4	Superman II in Australia only opens worldwide on June 19, 1981.	Warner Bros. / Dovemead Ltd. / International Film Production	Richard Lester (director); Mario Puzo, David Newman, Leslie Newman (screenplay); Christopher Reeve, Gene Hackman, Ned Beatty, Jackie Cooper, Sarah Douglas, Margot Kidder, Jack O'Halloran, Valerie Perrine, Susannah York, Clifton James, E. G. Marshall, Marc McClure, Terence Stamp, Leueen Willoughby, Robin Pappas, Richard Griffiths, John Ratzenberger, Shane Rimmer, John Morton, Angus MacInnes, Antony Sher, Elva Mai Hoover, Hadley Kay, John Hollis, Gordon Rollings, Bill Bailey, Marcus D'Amico, Richard LeParmentier, Don Fellows, Michael J. Shannon, Pepper Martin, Eugene Lipinski, Peter Brace, Jean-Pierre Cassel, Tony Clarkin, Peter Diamond, Richard Donner, Harry Fielder	
D E C E M B E R	5	Flash Gordon	Universal Pictures / Starling Productions / Famous Films	Mike Hodges (director); Lorenzo Semple Jr. (screenplay); Sam J. Jones, Melody Anderson, Max von Sydow, Topol, Ornella Muti, Timothy Dalton, Brian Blessed, Peter Wyngarde, Mariangela Melato, Richard O'Brien, John Osborne, Philip Stone, John Hallam, Suzanne Danielle, John Morton, William Hootkins, Robbie Coltrane, Peter Duncan, John Hollis, Leon Greene, Tony Scannell, Bogdan Kominowski, George Harris, Deep Roy, Bob Goody, Kenny Baker, Malcolm Dixon	
D E C E M B E R	6	Popeye	Paramount Pictures / Walt Disney Productions / Robert Evans Productions / King Features Syndicate	Robert Altman (director); Jules Feiffer (screenplay); Robin Williams, Shelley Duvall, Paul L. Smith, Paul Dooley, Richard Libertini, Ray Walston, Donald Moffat, Roberta Maxwell, Donovan Scott, Allan F. Nicholls, Bill Irwin, Sharon Kinney, Linda Hunt, Geoff Hoyle, Wayne Robson, Klaus Voormann, Van Dyke Parks, Dennis Franz, Carlos Brown, Jack Mercer, John Wallace, MacIntyre Dixon, Wesley Ivan Hurt, Peter Bray	
D E C E M B E R	12	Stir Crazy	Columbia Pictures	Sidney Poitier (director); Bruce Jay Friedman (screenplay); Gene Wilder, Richard Pryor, Georg Stanford Brown, JoBeth Williams, Miguel Ángel Suárez, Craig T. Nelson, Barry Corbin, Charles Weldon, Nicolas Coster, Joel Brooks, Jonathan Banks, Erland Van Lidth, Cedrick Hardman, Luis Ávalos, Esther Sutherland, Pamela Poitier, Claudia Cron, Grand L. Bush, Lee Purcell, Lewis Van Bergen, Franklin Ajaye, Alvin Ing, Herbert Hirschman, Mickey Jones, Billy Beck	
D E C E M B E R	12	Tess	Columbia Pictures / Pathé Films	Roman Polanski (director); Thomas Hardy, Gérard Brach, Roman Polanski (screenplay); Nastassja Kinski, Peter Firth, Leigh Lawson, John Collin	
D E C E M B E R	17	Any Which Way You Can	Warner Bros. / The Malpaso Company	Buddy Van Horn (director); Stanford Sherman, Jeremy Joe Kronsberg (screenplay); Clint Eastwood, Sondra Locke, Geoffrey Lewis, Ruth Gordon, William Smith, Barry Corbin, Harry Guardino, Michael Cavanaugh, James Gammon, John Quade, Al Ruscio, Jack Murdock, George Murdock, Dick Durock, Camila Ashlend, Anne Ramsey, Logan Ramsey, Jim Stafford, Michael Talbott, Mark L. Taylor, Jack Thibeau, Charles Walker	
D E C E M B E R	17	The Dogs of War	United Artists	John Irvin (director); Gary DeVore, George Malko (screenplay); Christopher Walken, Tom Berenger, Colin Blakely, Hugh Millais, Paul Freeman, Jean-François Stévenin, JoBeth Williams, Maggie Scott, Robert Urquhart, Winston Ntshona, Pedro Armendáriz Jr., Harlan Cary Poe, Ed O'Neill, Shane Rimmer, George Harris, David Schofield, Terence Rigby, Olu Jacobs, Alan Beckwith, Jim Broadbent	
D E C E M B E R	17	Nightkill	Cine Artist Film	Ted Post (director); Joan Andre (screenplay); Jaclyn Smith, Mike Connors, James Franciscus, Robert Mitchum, Fritz Weaver, Sybil Danning, Belinda Mayne, Michael Anderson Jr., Tina Menard, Melanie MacQueen	
D E C E M B E R	19	9 to 5	20th Century Fox / IPC Films	Colin Higgins (director/screenplay); Patricia Resnick (screenplay); Jane Fonda, Lily Tomlin, Dolly Parton, Dabney Coleman, Elizabeth Wilson, Sterling Hayden, Henry Jones, Lawrence Pressman, Marian Mercer, Renn Woods, Norma Donaldson, Roxanna Bonilla-Giannini, Peggy Pope, Richard Stahl, Ray Vitte	
D E C E M B E R	19	The Aristocats (re-release)	Walt Disney Productions / Buena Vista Distribution	Wolfgang Reitherman (director); Ken Anderson, Larry Clemmons, Eric Cleworth, Vance Gerry, Julius Svendsen, Ralph Thomas, Ralph Wright (screenplay); Phil Harris, Eva Gabor, Sterling Holloway, Scatman Crothers, Paul Winchell, Lord Tim Hudson, Thurl Ravenscroft, Dean Clark, Liz English, Gary Dubin, Vito Scotti, Nancy Kulp, Pat Buttram, George Lindsey, Hermione Baddeley, Charles Lane, Roddy Maude-Roxby, Monica Evans, Carole Shelley, Bill Thompson, Peter Renaday, Ruth Buzzi, June Foray, Robie Lester, Clarence Nash	
D E C E M B E R	19	The Formula	United Artists / CIP Filmproduktion	John G. Avildsen (director); Steve Shagan (screenplay); Marlon Brando, George C. Scott, Marthe Keller, John Gielgud, G. D. Spradlin, Beatrice Straight, Richard Lynch, John van Dreelen, Robin Clarke, Ike Eisenmann, Marshall Thompson, Dieter Schidor, Werner Kreindl, Jan Niklas, Wolfgang Preiss, David Byrd, Ferdy Mayne, Alan North, Calvin Jung, Louis Basile, Gerry Murphy, Craig T. Nelson, Herb Voland	
D E C E M B E R	19	Inside Moves	Associated Film Distribution / ITC Entertainment	Richard Donner (director); Valerie Curtin, Barry Levinson (screenplay); John Savage, David Morse, Diana Scarwid, Amy Wright, Tony Burton, Bill Henderson, Steve Kahan, Jack O'Leary, Bert Remsen, Harold Russell, Pepe Serna, Harold Sylvester, William Frankfather, Arnold Williams, George Brenlin, Gerri Dean	
D E C E M B E R	19	The Jazz Singer	Associated Film Distribution / EMI Films	Richard Fleischer (director); Herbert Baker, Stephen H. Foreman (screenplay); Neil Diamond, Laurence Olivier, Lucie Arnaz, Catlin Adams, Franklin Ajaye, Paul Nicholas, Sully Boyar, Mike Kellin, James Booth	
D E C E M B E R	19	The Mirror Crack'd	Columbia-Warner Distributors / EMI Films / GW Films	Guy Hamilton (director); Jonathan Hales, Barry Sandler (screenplay); Angela Lansbury, Elizabeth Taylor, Kim Novak, Rock Hudson, Edward Fox, Geraldine Chaplin, Tony Curtis, Charles Gray, Richard Pearson, Wendy Morgan, Margaret Courtenay, Carolyn Pickles, Charles Lloyd-Pack, Pat Nye, Norman Wooland, Richard Leech, Sam Kydd, Pierce Brosnan, Anthony Steel, Dinah Sheridan, Nigel Stock, Hildegard Neil, John Bennett, Allan Cuthbertson, Marella Oppenheim, Maureen Bennett, Eric Dodson, Thick Wilson, Peter Woodthorpe	
D E C E M B E R	19	Seems Like Old Times	Columbia Pictures / Rastar	Jay Sandrich (director); Neil Simon (screenplay); Chevy Chase, Goldie Hawn, Charles Grodin, Robert Guillaume, Yvonne Wilder, Harold Gould, George Grizzard, T. K. Carter, Judd Omen, Marc Alaimo, Chris Lemmon	
D E C E M B E R	25	Altered States	Warner Bros.	Ken Russell (director); Sidney Aaron (screenplay); William Hurt, Blair Brown, Bob Balaban, Charles Haid, Thaao Penghlis, Drew Barrymore, Megan Jeffers, Dori Brenner, Peter Brandon, George Gaynes, Jack Murdock, John Larroquette	
D E C E M B E R	25	First Family	Warner Bros. / F.F. Associates	Buck Henry (director/screenplay); Bob Newhart, Madeline Kahn, Gilda Radner, Richard Benjamin, Bob Dishy, Harvey Korman, Fred Willard, Rip Torn, Austin Pendleton, John Hancock, Julius Harris	

== See also ==
- List of 1980 box office number-one films in the United States
- 1980 in the United States
