= Ray Reinhardt =

American film, stage and television actor (1930–2026)

- Reinhardt in Time After Time, 1979
- Born: Raymond Harald Reinhardt; March 28, 1930; New York, U.S.
- Died: August 5, 2026 (aged 96); Oakland, California, U.S.
- Occupations: Film, stage and television actor

Raymond Harald Reinhardt (March 28, 1930 – August 5, 2026) was an American film, stage and television actor.

== Life and career ==
Reinhardt was born in New York, the son of Max and Carola Reinhardt. His parents were German immigrants. He attended DeWitt Clinton High School, graduating in 1948. After graduating, he served in the United States Army. During his military service in the 1950s, he appeared in the stage play Golden Boy, which after his discharge, he attended the London Academy of Music and Dramatic Art. He appeared in numerous stage plays such as Tiny Alice, Hamlet, The Plough and the Stars, She Stoops to Conquer, Peer Gynt, The Great God Brown and The Octoroon. He also acted at the Arena Stage Company from 1961 to 1964, and the American Conservatory Theater. According to Enterprise-Record, he was a Shakespearean actor.

Later in his career, Reinhardt guest-starred in television programs including Gunsmoke, Hawaii Five-O, Mannix, The Bold and the Beautiful, Hill Street Blues, Matlock, Star Trek: The Next Generation and Star Trek: Voyager. In 1980, he starred as Dr. Williams in the film Cardiac Arrest, starring along with Max Gail, Michael Paul Chan, Garry Goodrow and Fred Ward. He also appeared in films such as The Hunt for Red October, The Guardian, Weeds, Time After Time, Almost an Angel and Jexi. During his screen career, in 2005, he appeared in the stage play The Price at Aurora Theatre Company in Berkeley, California.

== Death ==
Reinhardt died at his home in Oakland, California, on August 5, 2026, at the age of 96.
