= Goodrow =

Goodrow is a surname. Notable people with the surname include:

- Barclay Goodrow (born 1993), Canadian professional ice hockey player
- Garry Goodrow (1933–2014), American actor
