= The Savage Girl =

The Savage Girl may refer to:

- The Savage Girl (film), a 1932 American pre-Code film
- The Savage Girl (novel), a 2001 novel by Alex Shakar
