= Weeds (1987 film) =

1987 film by John D. Hancock

- Theatrical release poster
- Directed by: John D. Hancock
- Written by: John D. Hancock; Dorothy Tristan
- Produced by: Bill Badalato
- Starring: Nick Nolte; Ernie Hudson; Lane Smith; Mark Rolston; William Forsythe; Joe Mantegna; J.J. Johnston; Rita Taggart
- Cinematography: Jan Weincke
- Edited by: David Handman; Jon Poll; Chris Lebenzon
- Music by: Angelo Badalamenti
- Distributed by: De Laurentiis Entertainment Group
- Release date: October 16, 1987
- Running time: 115 minutes
- Country: United States
- Language: English
- Budget: $12 million
- Box office: $2,325,444

Weeds is a 1987 American drama film directed by John D. Hancock, and starring Nick Nolte, Ernie Hudson, Lane Smith, Mark Rolston, William Forsythe, Joe Mantegna, J.J. Johnston and Rita Taggart. The screenplay concerns a prison inmate who writes a play that catches the attention of a visiting reporter.

== Plot ==
Lee Umstetter is incarcerated in San Quentin for armed robbery, serving "life without possibility" (with no chance of parole). After two suicide attempts, Lee begins to read books from the prison library. He attends a performance of Waiting for Godot given for the prisoners and is deeply moved. He begins to write plays about imprisonment and then stages them, too.

One is a social-protest musical extravaganza about life in the penitentiary. It attracts visitors and earns Lee the regard of a San Francisco theatre reviewer who persuades the governor to release him.

Lee organises an acting troupe made up of former convicts: a shoplifter, a murderer, an embezzler, a pimp, a flasher, and others.

Lee's work doesn't make the same impact outside the prison as it did inside. Touring in a camper with no money, the men are torn by impulses to revert to their former criminal behavior.

== Cast ==
- Nick Nolte as Lee Umstetter
- Cyro Baptista as Bass Guitar
- William Forsythe as Burt "The Booster"
- Ernie Hudson as Bagdad
- J.J. Johnston as Lazarus
- Joe Mantegna as Carmine
- Mark Rolston as Dave
- Essex Smith as Vocalist #1
- Lane Smith as Claude
- Orville Stoeber as Lead Guitar
- Rita Taggart as Lillian Bingington
- John Toles-Bey as Navarro
- Sam Waymon as Vocalist #2
- Anne Ramsey as Mom Unstetter
- Ray Reinhardt as Dad Unstetter

== Reception ==
The film received mixed reviews. Audiences polled by CinemaScore gave the film an average grade of "A" on an A+ to F scale.

Film critic Pauline Kael of The New Yorker observed, "The film is about their efforts to become professional men of the theatre. It's about the ways in which working together changes them and the ways in which it doesn't."

The film had a strong opening weekend, but failed to recoup its costs. The film did well on VHS.
