= Alex Shakar =

American novelist and short story writer (born 1968)

- Born: Alexander Michael Shakar; April 25, 1968 (age 58); Brooklyn, New York, U.S.
- Parent: Martin Shakar (father)

Academic background
- Education: Yale University (BA); University of Illinois Chicago (PhD)

Academic work
- Discipline: English literature Creative writing
- Institutions: University of Illinois at Urbana–Champaign

Alexander Michael Shakar (born April 25, 1968) is an American novelist, short story writer, and academic. His novel Luminarium (Soho Press, 2011) received the Los Angeles Times Book Prize in Fiction. His first novel, The Savage Girl, was chosen as a "Notable Book" by The New York Times, was a IndieBound pick, and has been translated into six languages.

== Early life and education ==
Shakar was born and raised in Brooklyn, New York, where he attended Stuyvesant High School. He graduated from Yale University in 1990. He was a Michener Fellow at the University of Texas at Austin, and earned his Ph.D. in English and creative writing from the University of Illinois Chicago. He is the son of actor Martin Shakar.

== Career ==
In 1996, Shakar won the National Fiction Competition and the Independent Presses Editors' "Pick of the Year" for his first collection of short stories, City in Love. Set in a mythical version of New York City, the book reimagines transformation myths of Ovid’s Metamorphoses.

In 2001, Shakar’s first novel, The Savage Girl, was released to broad critical acclaim, garnering comparisons to Thomas Pynchon, Don DeLillo, Neal Stephenson, George Orwell, Aldous Huxley, and Tom Wolfe. Set in a fictional American metropolis, the story follows its protagonist, Ursula Van Urden, as she trains as a trendspotter, attempts to help her schizophrenic fashion model sister Ivy, and understand a homeless girl she calls the “savage girl,” who lives in a city park.

Shakar's novel Luminarium received acclaim for its "penetrating look at the uneasy intersection of technology and spirituality" Set primarily in New York City, Luminarium follows Fred Brounian, a former co-CEO of a software company devoted to creating Utopian virtual worlds, as he copes with circumstances beyond his control. It won the 2011 Los Angeles Times Book Prize (Fiction), was selected as an "Editor's Choice" by The New York Times Book Review, and was ranked as among the best and most notable books of the year by numerous reviewers and media outlets including The Washington Post, Publishers Weekly, and NPR.

Shakar lives in Chicago and teaches fiction writing as an associate professor at the University of Illinois at Urbana–Champaign.

== Bibliography ==
- City in Love – Fiction Collective 2, 1996. ISBN 1-57366-023-X ISBN 978-1573660235
- The Savage Girl – HarperCollins, 2001. ISBN 0-06-620987-0 ISBN 978-0066209876
- Luminarium – Soho Press, August 2011. ISBN 1-56947-975-5 ISBN 978-1569479759
