= Rita Taggart =

American actress

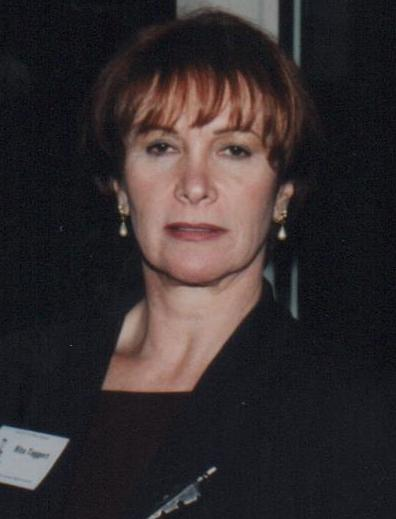
- Taggart in 1999
- Occupation: Actress
- Years active: 1975–present
- Spouse: Haskell Wexler (m. 1989; died 2015)

Rita Taggart is an American film and television actress. She is known for playing Carla Bouvier on Night Court.

== Biography ==
Taggart was the third wife of cinematographer Haskell Wexler from 1989 until his death at age 93 in 2015.

On television, Taggart portrayed Blanche on Steambath, Marie Roscini in Hello, Larry, Diane in Eye to Eye, and Joan Foley in Almost Grown. Her TV acting credits included guest role appearances on such shows as Rhoda, Taxi, Kate & Allie, Scarecrow and Mrs. King, Quantum Leap, Coach, and Cagney and Lacey.

Her film credits include the made-for-TV movie James Dean (1976), Coming Home (1978), The China Syndrome (1979) and the TV movie Wait Till Your Mother Gets Home! (1983). She has most recently appeared in the films Circle in 2010 and Go for Sisters in 2013.

== Filmography ==
=== Feature films ===
Year	Title	Role	Notes
1978	Coming Home	Johnson	
1978	Straight Time	Carol Schue	
1979	The China Syndrome	Rita Jacovich	
1979	1941	Reporter	
1980	Die Laughing	Thelma	
1980	Used Cars	Woman In Bed	
1985	Torchlight	Rita	
1987	Weeds	Lillian Bingington	
1989	The Horror Show	Donna McCarthy	
1990	Coupe de Ville	Betty Libner	
1992	Crossing the Bridge	Kate Golden	
1995	Steal Big Steal Little	Autumn McBride	
1999	Limbo	Lou	
1999	Inspector Gadget: Gadget's Greatest Gadgets	Nurse	video
2001	Mulholland Drive	Linney James	
2005	The Big Empty	Bookstore Co-Worker	Short film
2008	A Quiet Little Marriage	Nurse Green	
2010	Circle	Professor McAdams	
2012	Tracer Gun	Abby's Mother	Short film
2013	Go for Sisters	Rhonda	
2019	Where Are You	Jeanne	

=== Television films ===
Year	Title	Role	Notes
1976	James Dean	—N/a	Uncredited
1980	Rape and Marriage: The Rideout Case	Amy Morrison	
1980	Seizure: The Story of Kathy Morris	Nina	
1981	Inmates: A Love Story	Salt	
1981	Every Stray Dog and Kid	—N/a	
1981	Born to Be Sold	Janet Carlson	
1982	Mae West	Sally	
1983	Wait till Your Mother Gets Home!	Mrs. Walt Johnson	
1984	The Cartier Affair	Monica	
1988	Splash, Too	Fern Hooten	
1993	At Home with the Webbers	Emma Webber	

=== Television series ===
Year	Title	Role	Notes
1975	Rhoda	Groovy Girl	Episode: "Somebody Down There Likes Him "
1978	Taxi	Vivian Harrow	Episode: "Paper Marriage"
1979	David Cassidy: Man Undercover	Helen	Episode: "Death Is a Close Friend, Too"
1980	Hello, Larry	Marie	Episode: "Love Around the Corner"
1981	Knots Landing	Rose	Episode: "Moments of Truth "
1982–84	Cagney & Lacey	Rochelle Zimmer	2 episodes
1984	Night Court	Carla Bouvier	4 episodes
1984	Steambath	Blanche	6 episodes
1985	Inspector Gadget	Various roles	6 episodes; voice
1986	The Colbys	Brenda	Episode: "Double Jeopardy "
1986	Hotel	Sheila Jessup	Episode: "Scapegoats"
1988–89	Almost Grown	Joan Foley	13 episodes
1990	Columbo	Mrs. Staplin	Uncredited; Episode: "Agenda for Murder"
1991	Quantum Leap	Marsha	Episode: "Southern Comforts - August 4, 1961"
1992–94	Northern Exposure	Edna Hancock	3 episodes
1992	Murder, She Wrote	Janine Foster	Episode: "The Classic Murder"
1994–95	Coach	Ruthanne	7 episodes
2002	Liberty's Kids	Various roles	5 episodes; voice
2004	Line of Fire	Dr. Kathryn Metters	Episode: "Mother & Child Reunion"
2012	FutureStates	Dr. Antal	Episode: "Laura Keller: NB"
2015–17	Where the Bears Are	Doris Dorkoff	13 episodes
