= Die Laughing (film) =

1980 film by Jeff Werner

- Theatrical release poster
- Directed by: Jeff Werner
- Screenplay by: Jerry Segal; Robby Benson; Scott Parker
- Story by: Scott Parker
- Produced by: Robby Benson; Mark Canton
- Starring: Robby Benson; Linda Grovenor; Charles Durning; Elsa Lanchester; Bud Cort; Rita Taggart
- Cinematography: David Myers
- Edited by: Neil Travis
- Music by: Robby Benson (original songs); Jerry Segal (lyrics); Craig Safan (scoring)
- Production company: Orion Pictures
- Distributed by: Warner Bros.
- Release date: May 23, 1980
- Running time: 108 minutes
- Country: United States
- Language: English
- Box office: $4,000,000

Die Laughing is a 1980 American comedy thriller film released by Orion Pictures and starring Robby Benson.

== Plot ==
A young cab driver and aspiring singer becomes embroiled in a plot to kidnap a monkey that has memorized a scientific formula with the potential to destroy the world.

== Cast ==
- Robby Benson as Pinsky
- Linda Grovenor as Amy
- Charles Durning as Arnold
- Elsa Lanchester as Sophie
- Bud Cort as Mueller
- Rita Taggart as Thelma
- Marty Zagon as Friend
- Larry Hankin as Bock
- Sam Krachmalnick as Zhukov
- Michael David Lee as Einstein
- Peter Coyote as Davis
- Charles Fleischer as Charlie
- Charles Harwood as Marvin
- Melanie Henderson as Betty
- Carel Struycken as Gregor the Giant
- Chuck Dorsett as Dr. Stowe
- Morgan Upton as Record judge
- Christopher Pray as Detective
- John Bracci as Lt. Allen
- James Cranna as Newscaster
- Joe Bellan as Dispatcher
- John Tim Burrus as Fred
- Maurice Argent as Jewish man
- Rhoda Gemignani as Russian ticket taker
- Nick Outin as Ringmaster
- Roger Johnson as Gil
- John E. Tidwell as Ray
- Cynthia Brian as Courtney
- Regina Waldon as Screaming lady
- Scott DeVenney as Contest judge
- O-Lan Jones as Judge
