= Gil Rogers =

American actor (1934–2021)

- Gil Rogers in The Children in 1980
- Born: John Veach Rogers Jr. February 4, 1934; Lexington, Kentucky, U.S.
- Died: March 2, 2021 (aged 87); Encinitas, California, U.S.
- Education: Transylvania University
- Occupation: Actor
- Years active: 1960–2010
- Spouses: Juliet Ribet (m. 1964; div. 1969) Margaret Hall (m. 1970; died 2015)
- Children: 1

Gil Rogers (born John Veach Rogers Jr.; February 4, 1934 – March 2, 2021) was an American television actor.

== Early life and education ==
Rogers was born John Veach Rogers Jr. Rogers graduated from Henry Clay High School and then attended Harvard University majoring in chemistry, but later after deciding he wanted to pursue a career as an actor, transferred to Transylvania University because it had a drama department; he would later graduate from there.

== Career ==
Rogers began acting as a child in Lexington Children's Theatre.

Rogers received his equity card in 1955 while working in local theater in Lexington. He would go on to perform in hundreds of plays in summer stock and regional theater. His most notable theater roles include Broadway productions of The Great White Hope, The Corn is Green and for 2 1/2 years played Sheriff Ed Earl Dodd in The Best Little Whorehouse in Texas.

He is perhaps best known for his roles on several daytime dramas, most notably as Ray Gardner on All My Children, Hawk Shayne on Guiding Light and as Dr. Martin Brandt on The Doctors. He also starred in a series of Grape-Nuts cereal commercials, which ran on television for five years.

His film roles include Eddie Macon's Run, W.W. and the Dixie Dancekings and the cult horror film The Children.

== Personal life ==
Rogers married actress Juliet Ribet in 1964, and they divorced in 1969. He married actress Margaret Hall in 1970, and they remained wed until her death in 2015. They had a daughter, actress Amanda Hall Rogers.

== Death ==
Rogers died in his sleep at his daughter's residence in Encinitas, California, on March 2, 2021, at the age of 87.
