= Martin Shakar =

American actor

- Born: January 1, 1940 (age 86); Detroit, Michigan, U.S.
- Occupation: Actor
- Years active: 1966–present
- Spouse: Diane Stern
- Children: 2, including Alex Shakar

Martin Shakar (born January 1, 1940) is an American theatre, film and television actor.

He was born in Detroit, Michigan to an Armenian/Assyrian family from Adıyaman, Turkey and lives in Brooklyn, New York.

A life member of The Actors Studio, Shakar has played in a number of Broadway and off-Broadway productions. In television shows, he has appeared four times in The Equalizer and three times in Law & Order, as different characters. He has appeared in 15 films since 1976. His most notable role was in Saturday Night Fever as Frank Manero, Jr., older brother to John Travolta's Tony Manero. He has also appeared in a number of television advertisements, usually playing Italian or Arab roles.

== Filmography ==
=== Film ===
Martin Shakar film credits
Year	Title	Role	Notes
1976	Blood Bath	Uncredited	
1977	Saturday Night Fever	Frank Manero Jr.	
1980	The Children	John Freemont	
1983	Without a Trace	Police Officer	
1984	Over the Brooklyn Bridge	Banker	
1985	Invasion U.S.A.	CIA Agent Peter Adams	
1989	Signs of Life	Mr. Castanho	
1994	Fresh	Detective Abe Sharp	
1998	A Price Above Rubies	Mr. Berman	
1998	Hell's Kitchen	The Warden	
2003	Uptown Girls	Mr. Feldman	
2005	It's About Time	Father	
2007	The Last New Yorker	Sal	
2007	Against the Current	Boatyard Owner	
2013	Franny	Hotel Manager	In post-production

=== Television ===
Martin Shakar television credits
Year	Title	Role	Notes
1975	Ryan's Hope	Harvey Miller	Episode: #1.13
1978	The Dark Secret of Harvest Home	David Adwell	TV mini-series
1979	You Can't Go Home Again	Uncredited	TV movie
1979	Torn Between Two Lovers	Frank Conti	TV movie
1985	Kojak: The Belarus File	Assistant District Attorney	TV movie
1987	Kojak: The Price of Justice	Arnold Nadler	TV movie
1986	The Equalizer	Frank Morrow	Episode: "Prelude"
1987	The Equalizer	Kelly Stigman	Episode: "Christmas Presence"
1989	The Equalizer	Harriman	Episode: "The Visitation"
1989	The Equalizer	Detective	Episode: "Endgame"
1990	Law & Order	Nick Costas Sr.	Episode: "By Hooker, by Crook"
1993	L.A. Law	Judge Martin Pirsig	Episode: "Spanky and the Art Gang"
1996	Law & Order	Stephan Elstead	Episode: "Double Blind"
2004	Push	Walter	Short subject
2005	Nicky's Game	Bobby	Short subject
2008	Law & Order	Doctor	Episode: "Darkness"
2009	Weequahic	Sam The Pigeon	Short subject
2011	Unforgettable	Gordon Kemp	Episode: "Spirited Away"
