= The Savage Girl (novel) =

2001 novel by Alex Shakar

- Author: Alex Shakar
- Language: English
- Genre: Fiction
- Publisher: HarperCollins
- Publication date: September 18, 2001
- Publication place: United States
- Pages: 288
- ISBN: 0-06-620987-0

The Savage Girl is the first novel by American author Alex Shakar. It was published in 2001.

== Plot summary ==
Main character Ursula Van Urden is introduced arriving in Middle City, a fictional American metropolis built around a volcano. She plans to care for her younger sister Ivy, a model who has recently suffered a much-publicized schizophrenic meltdown. After arriving in Middle City, Ursula begins working for Ivy's former boyfriend, Chas Lacouture, at the trendspotting firm Tomorrow, Ltd. She is trained as a trendspotter by both Chas and a new coworker, Javier Delreal.

Javier, a manic optimist, takes Ursula on rollerblading and party-crashing expeditions, predicting a new megatrend he calls the "Light Age," a "renaissance of self-creation," which he believes will coincide with the defeat of irony. By contrast, Chas, a cynical ex-philosophy professor, takes her to skulk in supermarkets and spy on customers, and introduces her to the concept of "paradessence," the "broken soul" at the center of every product, consisting of two opposing desires that it will promise to satisfy simultaneously.

As Ivy resumes her modeling activities, Ursula's trendspotting work focuses on a homeless girl who lives in a city park, makes her own clothing, and hunts pigeons for food. This eponymous "savage girl" forms the basis of a marketing campaign for a new product, "Diet Water," and serves as a harbinger for Chas and Javier alike, of the new age to come.

== Characters ==
- Ursula Van Urden – Protagonist
- Ivy Van Urden – Ursula's younger sister, a schizophrenic fashion model
- Chas Lacouture – Ursula's boss, a trendspotter
- Javier Delreal – Ursula's coworker, a trendspotter
- The Savage Girl – a homeless girl, the basis for Ursula's marketing campaign
- Gwennan – Ursula's and Ivy's mother, a retired plastic surgeon
- James T. Couch – Ursula's coworker, über-ironist and trendspotter
- Ed Cabaj – head of marketing for General Foods' New Beverage division
- Camille Stypnick – art director for the ad agency Mitchell and Chennault
- Eeven – an inner-city boy for whom Javier becomes a Big Brother

== Release details ==
- 2001, USA, HarperCollins, ISBN 0-06-620987-0, hardcover
- 2001, UK, Scribner, ISBN 0-7432-0724-6
- 2002, USA, HarperPerennial, ISBN 0-06-093523-5, paperback
- 2002, France (“Look Sauvage,” trans. Daniel Lemoine), Au Diable Vauvert, ISBN 2-84626-047-8
- 2002, Germany (“Der Letzte Schrei,” trans. Johannes Sabinski), Rowohlt, ISBN 3-499-23175-1
- 2003, Japan (trans. Masako Sasada), Artist House Publishers, ISBN 4-04-898129-3
- 2003, Poland (“Dzikuska,” trans. Dorota Stadnik), MUZA SA, ISBN 83-7319-339-1
- 2005, Italy (“La Selvaggia,” trans. Elisa Villa), Fanucci Editore, ISBN 978-88-347-0965-8
- Thailand, Siam Inter Books, ISBN 974-9950-70-4
