= Cardiac Arrest (film) =

1980 film

- Theatrical release poster
- Directed by: Murray Mintz
- Written by: Murray Mintz
- Produced by: Richard Helzberg
- Starring: Max Gail; Garry Goodrow; Michael Paul Chan; Ray Reinhardt; Robert Behling; Susan O'Connell; Fred Ward
- Cinematography: Jon Else
- Edited by: John Nutt
- Music by: Andy Kulberg
- Release date: January 18, 1980
- Running time: 85 minutes
- Country: United States
- Language: English

Cardiac Arrest is a 1980 American slasher thriller film written and directed by Murray Mintz and starring Garry Goodrow, Max Gail and Fred Ward.

== Plot ==
The city of San Francisco is pushed into a state of terror and fear as a deranged murderer stalks the city. The police are baffled by the case and are led to extremes by a lunatic whose victims all have something in common: their hearts have been skillfully and surgically removed. Meanwhile, across town, a man must make a difficult decision regarding his wife, who needs a transplant.

== Cast ==
- Garry Goodrow as Clancy Higgins
- Michael Paul Chan as Wylie Wong
- Max Gail as Leigh Gregory
- Susan O'Connell as Dianne Gregory
- Ray Reinhardt as Dr. Williams
- Robert Behling as Harvey Nichols
- Fred Ward as Jamie
- Bill Akridge as Duke Miller
- Maurice Argent as Deputy Coroner
- Joe Bellan as Luggage Shop Salesman
- Gary Bisagna as Police Garage Mechanic
- Buzz Borelli as Tom Moore
- Joy Carlin as Dr. Burns
- Marjorie Eaton as Mrs. Swan
- Steve Eoff as Junkie
- Drew Eshelman as Jeweler
- Dana Evans as Police Lab Technician
- Sheldon Feldner as Pharmacist
- Nancy Fish as Tiffany
- Douglas Johnson as Banker
- Christopher Le Van as Child
