= Maurice Argent =

American actor

- Argent in Dirty Harry (1971)
- Born: Maurice Saul Argent; March 4, 1916
- Died: December 7, 1981 (aged 65)
- Occupation: Actor
- Years active: 1957–1980

Maurice Saul Argent (March 4, 1916 – December 7, 1981) was an American character actor who acted between 1957 and 1980. In addition to his film roles, he is remembered for his stage performances with the San Francisco Actor's Workshop. He played the role of Willy Loman in the Workshop's widely hailed 1953 production of Arthur Miller's Death of a Salesman.

He taught stagecraft to generations of San Francisco teens at George Washington High School and Lowell High School.

Argent died in San Francisco, California on December 7, 1981 at age 65.

== Filmography ==
| Year | Title | Role | Notes |
|---|---|---|---|
| 1957 | Pal Joey | Second Sailor | Uncredited |
| 1958 | Harbor Command | Gregory Cariff | 1 episode |
| 1971 | Dirty Harry | Sid Kleinman | |
| 1972 | One Is a Lonely Number | Pool Manager | |
| 1972–1976 | The Streets of San Francisco | Printer | 9 episodes |
| 1973 | Magnum Force | Nat Weinstein | |
| 1974 | Freebie and the Bean | Tailor | |
| 1978 | Invasion of the Body Snatchers | Chef | |
| 1980 | Cardiac Arrest | Deputy Coroner | |
| 1980 | Die Laughing | Jewish Man | (final film role) |
