= The Children (1980 film) =

1980 American horror film directed by Max Kalmanowicz

- Theatrical release poster
- Directed by: Max Kalmanowicz
- Written by: Carlton J. Albright; Edward Terry
- Produced by: Max Kalmanowicz; Carlton J. Albright
- Starring: Martin Shakar; Gil Rogers; Gale Garnett
- Cinematography: Barry Abrams
- Edited by: Nikki Wessling
- Music by: Harry Manfredini
- Production company: Albright Films
- Distributed by: World-Northal
- Release dates: June 6, 1980 (Tucson); July 4, 1980 (New York City)
- Running time: 93 minutes
- Country: United States
- Language: English
- Box office: $2.1 million—$7 million

The Children is a 1980 American horror film directed by Max Kalmanowicz, and starring Martin Shakar, Gil Rogers, and Gale Garnett. It follows a group of five children in a small New England town when they are transformed into zombies who, after being exposed to waste from a nuclear plant, microwave any living thing they touch.

An independent production, The Children was filmed in the Berkshires region of Massachusetts in the summer of 1979. World-Northal distributed the film in the United States, premiering it in Tucson, Arizona on June 6, 1981, followed by a New York City release on July 4. The film received generally negative reviews from critics.

== Plot ==
Jim and Slim, two workers at a chemical plant in the New England town of Ravensback, decide to call it a day and head for the bar. Unfortunately, a large buildup of pressure leaks from one of the pipes that starts to form a yellow toxic cloud that drifts across the ground. Meanwhile, a school bus is taking children home. After dropping one child off, five children are left on the bus.

After Billy Hart, the local sheriff, finds the idling bus abandoned near a cemetery, he radios his deputy and dispatcher. Billy orders a roadblock at the intersection of the main highway and the lone road leading into town, recruiting a couple of armed locals, believing that the children were possibly kidnapped.

While John and Billy are on the road, they encounter Janet Shore standing in the middle of the road, who is dazed like the other zombified children, pale-faced and apparently stunned as they put her in the car to drive her home. It turns out that Janet has not yet fully transformed into a radioactive zombie, but she gradually changes into one during the ride (as evidenced by her fingernails shown turning black). After they stopped, she attacks Sheriff Hart who is able to dodge her while she flees the vicinity.

Eventually, the zombified Ellen, Tommy, and Paul meet and walk together. They are then spotted by the deputy who radios the station, but is soon killed. The three children converge in front of the general store, where the dispatcher comes outside to hug them, but is also roasted to death as her screaming is heard on a police radio dispatcher by John and Billy.

Billy shoots the zombies with his pistol, but the bullets have no effect on them. Cathy, who is still not aware of the children's zombified state, knocks Billy out with a glass object in order to stop him from shooting them. She then finds Clarkie's roasted body and tells John, who runs upstairs and tearfully puts the child's body back to bed.

Paul then attacks the adults, while Billy instinctively picks up a replica katana and chops off both Paul's hands as he howls in pain, which kills Paul as the fingernails on his severed hands revert to normal. Ellen then breaks through one of the windows with one hand, which is immediately severed by Billy and causes her to apparently die. Billy and John then go outside with the sword in hand to find the rest of the zombies. The remaining three zombies, Tommy, Janet and Jenny, converge at the upper level of John's barn where they are found by John and Billy who, despite Jenny's pleas to John, are promptly dismembered and killed.

The next morning, Cathy yells to a still-sleeping John that "it's time". He wakes up and runs frantically into the house to help her deliver their third child. As they are delivering the baby, the camera pans over all of the dead bodies, including Sheriff Hart's (but not Clarkie's). All five of the zombified children are laying down peacefully and hacked up. After the baby is delivered, John is aghast and wide-eyed as he notices that his newborn child has black fingernails while being breastfed by Cathy.

== Cast ==
- Martin Shakar as John Freemont
- Gil Rogers as Sheriff Billy Hart
- Gale Garnett as Cathy Freemont
- Shannon Bolin as Molly
- Tracy Griswold as Deputy Harry Timmons
- Joy Glaccum as Suzie MacKenzie
- Jeptha Evans as Paul MacKenzie
- Clara Evans as Jenny Freemont
- Sarah Albright as Ellen Chandler
- Nathanael Albright as Tommy Button
- Julie Carrier as Janet Shore
- Michelle La Mothe as Dr. Joyce Gould
- Edward Terry as Hank
- Peter Maloney as Frank
- Jessie Abrams as Clarkie Freemont
- Rita Montone as Dee Dee Shore
- John P. Codiglia as Jackson Lane
- Martin Brennan as Sanford Butler-Jones
- J.D. Clarke as Jim (hardhat)
- James Klawin as Slim (hardhat)
- Arthur Chase as Cyrus MacKenzie
- Suzanne Barnes as Leslie Button
- Diane Deckard as Rita Chandler
- David Platt as Chauffeur
- Ray Delmolino as Bus driver
- Michael Carrier as Bob Chandler
- June Berry as Sally (Waitress)
- X. Ben Fakackt as Newscaster voice

== Production ==
=== Filming ===
Principal photography of The Children took place in the summer of 1979 in Great Barrington, Sheffield, and Egremont in western Massachusetts. The film had the working title The Children of Ravensback. The film's producer, Carlton Albright, was an alumnus of the nearby Berkshire School, where the crew lodged during production. Some filming also took place on the grounds of the school. Principal photography was expected to be completed by mid-July 1979.

== Music ==
The film's score was composed by Harry Manfredini, around the same time he was completing the score for Friday the 13th (1980). The score shares several musical cues with that of Friday the 13th.

== Release ==
The Children was given a limited theatrical release in the United States by World Northal, opening regionally in Tucson, Arizona on June 6, 1980. The film was released in the New York City area on July 4, 1980, and had its Los Angeles premiere that fall on September 26, 1980. The film continued screening regionally through 1981.

=== Home media ===
It was originally released on VHS by Vestron Video in the 1980s. It was later released on VHS by Rhino Home Video on April 11, 1991. The film was released for the first time on DVD in a 25th Anniversary edition by Troma Entertainment on November 8, 2005. It was later released by Videoasia as a part of its five-disc "Grindhouse Experience 20 Film Set" on July 24, 2007.

The film was released worldwide in November 2018 for the first time ever on Blu-ray by Vinegar Syndrome. Troma issued their own Blu-ray edition on April 13, 2021.

== Reception ==
=== Box office ===
Contemporary records from the American Film Institute indicate The Children grossed $7 million in the United States, though some sources suggest a lower gross of $2.1 million.

=== Critical response ===
Upon its theatrical release in 1980 The Children received generally negative reviews. The Los Angeles Times called it a "despicable movie" that "reeks of a nasty, ill-defined dislike of humankind." The Orlando Sentinel deemed the actors "the ugliest bunch of folks we've seen assembled on any screen at any one time." The Pittsburgh Post-Gazette criticized the writing, directing, acting and special effects; the latter slammed for burned bodies looking "exactly like a leftover pepperoni pizza, complete with black olives and anchovies." Stan Franklin of The Florida Times-Union panned the film as a "small, tacky horror picture."

Kenneth Shorey of The Birmingham News found the film's screenplay illogical, but did favorably observe that the film's "small-town setting and furnishings [are] divertingly evocative... One might almost wish Kalmanowicz had used the locale to make a film of more enduring merit, except that his skills as a director are dramatically nonexistent."

Horror film review website Terror Trap awarded the film one and a half out of four stars. Although they called Manfredini's score for the film "somewhat effective", they criticized the film's direction, cast, and low production values. Jonathan Stryker from HorrorNews.net gave the film a slightly positive review, calling it "a predictable, by-the-numbers but somewhat entertaining yarn".

== Sources ==
- Donahue, Suzanne Mary (1987). American Film Distribution: The Changing Marketplace. Ann Arbor, Michigan: UMI Research Press. ISBN 978-0-835-71776-2.
