= John Morton (actor) =

American actor, stuntman, and writer (b. 1947)

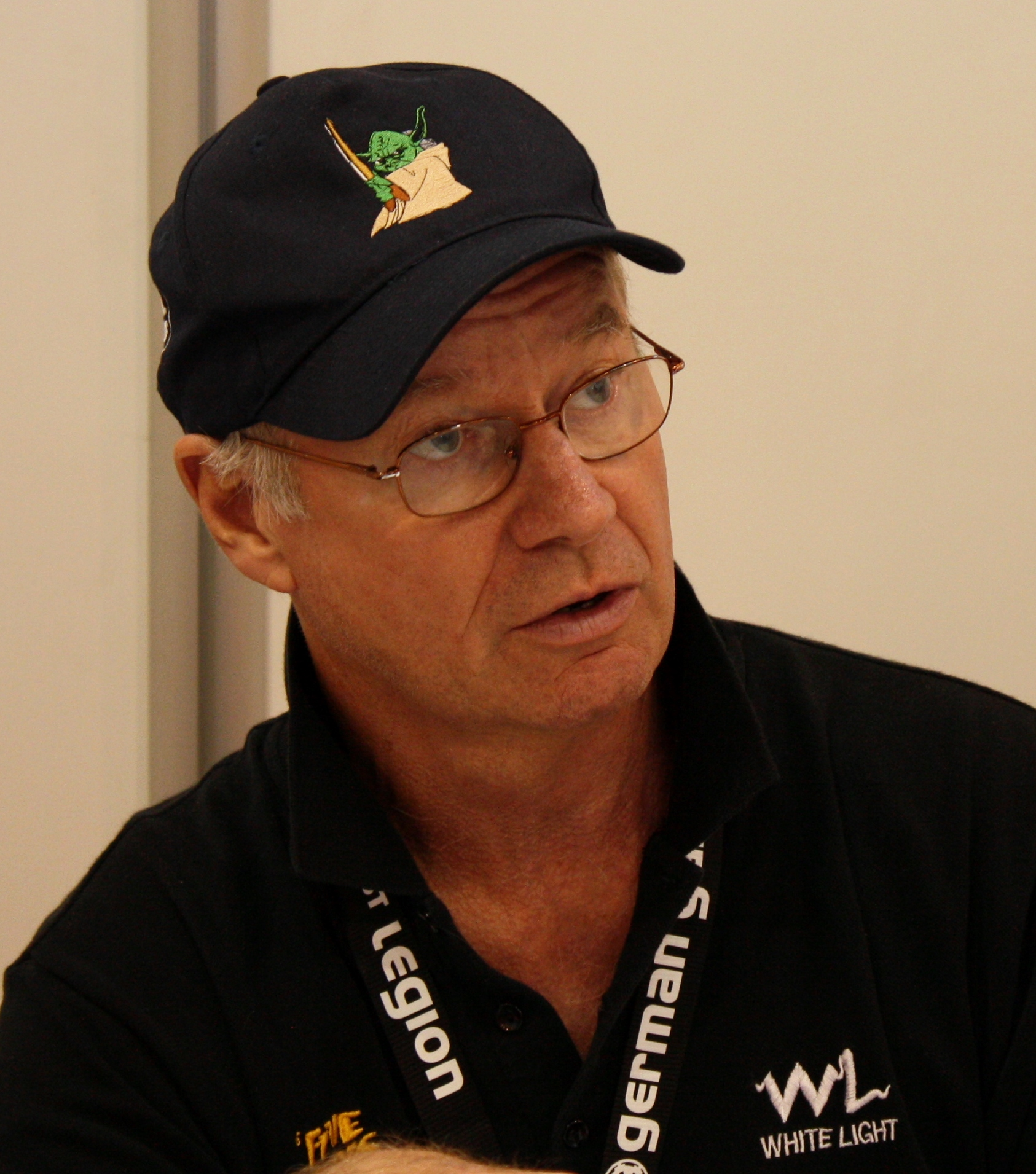
- Morton at Star Wars Celebration Europe II in Essen, Germany, 2013
- Born: John Fass Morton; March 26, 1947 (age 79); Annapolis, Maryland, U.S.
- Occupations: Actor, stuntman, writer
- Years active: 1976–present
- Spouse: Gail Morton

John Fass Morton (born March 26, 1947) is an American actor, stuntman and writer. He is known for playing Dak Ralter, Luke Skywalker's tailgunner in The Empire Strikes Back, and appearing as an astronaut in Superman II.

== Career ==
Morton appeared in A Bridge Too Far (1977), in the 1980 hit sequel film Superman II as an astronaut named Nate, and also that year he appeared in Flash Gordon. He was featured in the BBC television series Oppenheimer (1980). He portrayed Dak Ralter, Luke Skywalker's gunner during the Battle of Hoth in The Empire Strikes Back. When Jeremy Bulloch played an Imperial Officer, he needed someone to cover for him as Boba Fett. Being similar in height, Morton was a body double for two days in costume. He filmed with another unit, the sequence when Fett confronts Darth Vader in the Bespin hallway during Han Solo's torture, while Bulloch filmed his scenes as the Imperial Officer. Afterwards, he left Hollywood and eventually settled in public relations work back in Annapolis. He is also an accomplished musician (guitar player) and a writer (Backstory in Blue, 2008).

== Personal life ==
Morton is married to Gail, and has attended several Star Wars conventions throughout the world since 1997.

== Filmography ==
=== Film ===
Year	Title	Role	Notes	Ref.
1976	The Gumball Rally	Jaguar Team	Stuntman	
1977	A Bridge Too Far	U.S. Padre		
1979	Cuba	Gary		
1980	The Empire Strikes Back	Dak Ralter (Luke's Gunner)	Boba Fett (Body double), Uncredited	
1980	Flash Gordon	Airline Pilot		
1980	Superman II	Nate		

== Bibliography ==
- Morton, J.F. (2003). Mustin: A Naval Family of the Twentieth Century. Naval Institute Press. ISBN 978-1-59114-492-2.
- —— (2008). Backstory in Blue: Ellington at Newport '56. Rutgers University Press. ISBN 978-0-8135-4282-9.
- —— (2012). Next-generation Homeland Security: Network Federalism and the Course to National Preparedness. Naval Institute Press. ISBN 978-1-61251-088-0.
- —— (2024). Sea Power and the American Interest: From the Civil War to the Great War. Naval Institute Press. ISBN 978-1-68247-912-4.
