= Max Gail =

American actor (born 1943)

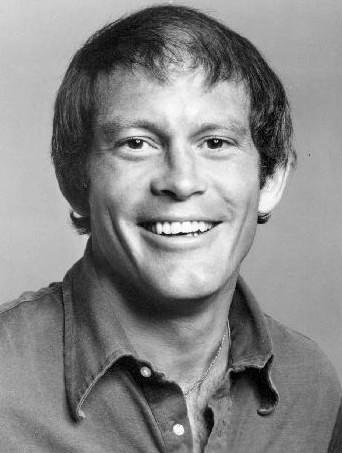
- Gail in 1975
- Born: Maxwell Trowbridge Gail, Jr. April 5, 1943 (age 83); Detroit, Michigan, U.S.
- Education: Williams College (BA); University of Michigan (MBA)
- Occupation: Actor
- Years active: 1970–present
- Spouses: Willie Beir (m. 1983; died 1986) Nan Harris (m. 1989; sep. 2000)
- Children: 3
- Awards: Daytime Emmy Award for Outstanding Supporting Actor in a Drama Series (General Hospital; 2019)

Maxwell Trowbridge Gail, Jr. (born April 5, 1943) is an American actor who has starred on stage, and in television and film roles. He is best known for his role as Detective Stan "Wojo" Wojciehowicz on the sitcom Barney Miller (1975–1982), which earned him two consecutive Primetime Emmy Award for Outstanding Supporting Actor in a Comedy Series nominations. Gail also won the 2019 and 2021 Daytime Emmy Award for Best Supporting Actor for his role as Mike Corbin on the soap opera General Hospital.

== Early life ==
Gail was born in Detroit, Michigan, the son of Mary Elizabeth (née Scanlon) and Maxwell Trowbridge Gail, a businessman, and raised in Grosse Ile, Michigan. He has a twin sister, actress Mary Gail, and another sister, Emily T. Gail.

He received a Bachelor of Arts degree from Williams College, and a Master of Business Administration degree from the University of Michigan. Gail was later an instructor for the University Liggett School before becoming an actor. His acting debut came in 1970 for the Little Fox Theatre in San Francisco, California, playing Chief Bromden in the original stage production of One Flew Over the Cuckoo's Nest. In 1973, he reprised this role in his New York stage debut.

== Career ==
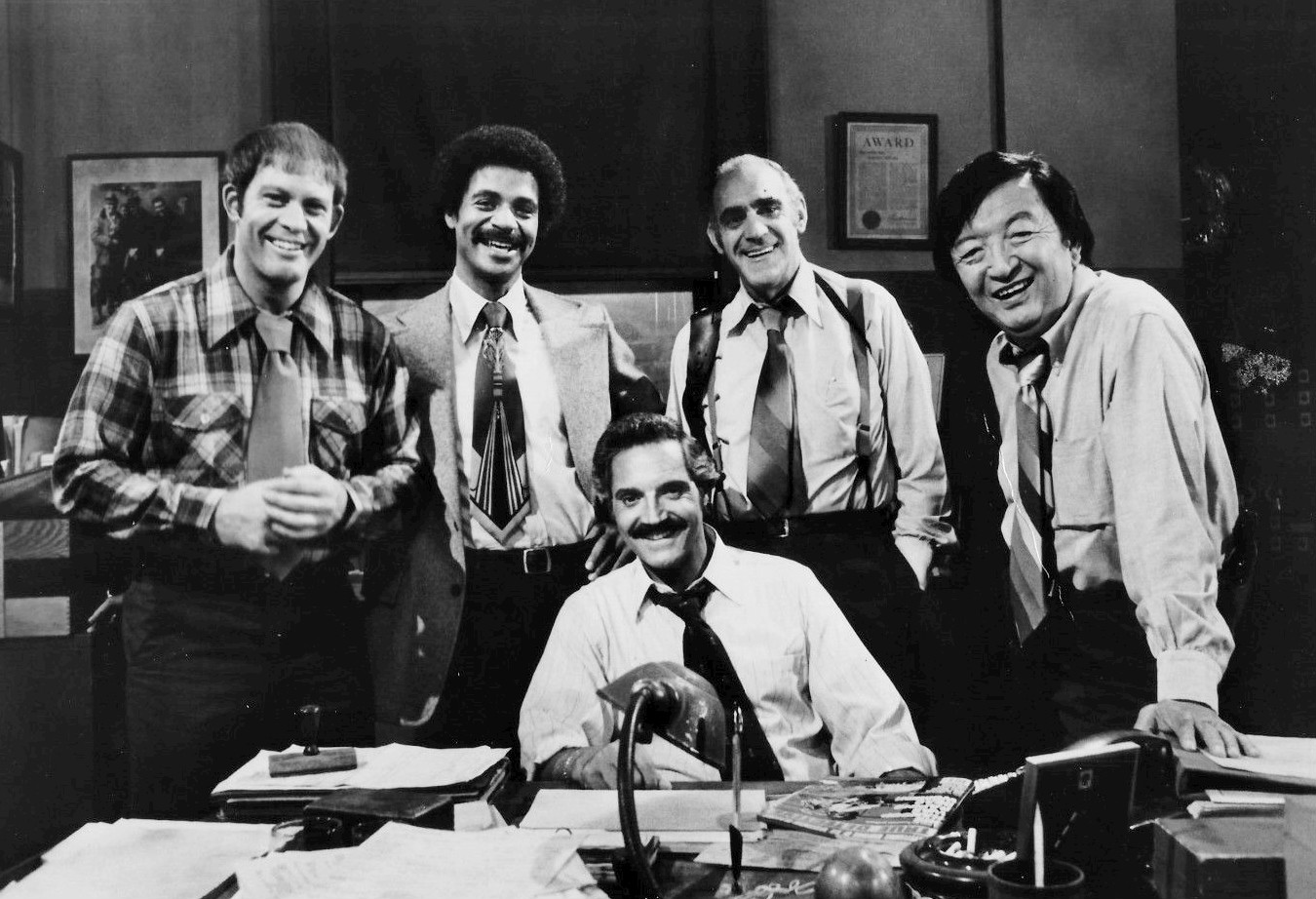
The 1977 cast of Barney Miller; (Back): Max Gail, Ron Glass, Abe Vigoda and Jack Soo; (front): Hal Linden

Gail is best known for his television role as Det. Stan "Wojo" Wojciehowicz in the sitcom Barney Miller (1975–1982). Gail's best-known feature film role is in D.C. Cab (1983) as Harold, the owner of the D.C. Cab taxi company. He directed several episodes of Barney Miller as Maxwell Gail.

In 1984, Gail was featured in the monodrama The Babe on Broadway. This stage play was filmed and later featured on PBS. Gail has starred in other TV series, including Whiz Kids (1983) as Llewellan Farley Jr., an investigative reporter who is friends with a group of teenaged computer hackers. He worked on the short-lived Normal Life (1990). He has appeared on the TV series Sons & Daughters (2006).

Gail has made many guest appearances on TV shows, such as: Walker, Texas Ranger ("Whitewater"); Cannon, Dr. Quinn, Medicine Woman, Due South, The Streets of San Francisco, Paul Sand in Friends and Lovers, Murder, She Wrote, The Drew Carey Show, Hawaii Five-0, Quantum Leap, Psych, Longmire, Gary Unmarried, NCIS, Scorpion, and Mad Men.

Gail appeared as Brooklyn Dodgers manager Burt Shotton in the 2013 film 42, about Jackie Robinson's first two years as a member of the Dodgers organization, including his first year of playing at the major-league level in 1947.

Gail runs Full Circle, a production company that has featured documentaries on such subjects as Agent Orange, Native Americans, and nuclear issues.

In 2015, Gail was nominated as Best Actor for his role in the short film In Memory at the Los Angeles International Film Festival.

Gail stepped into the recast role of Mike Corbin on General Hospital. He debuted on February 5, 2018, and went on to win the 2019 and 2021 Daytime Emmy Award for Best Supporting Actor.

== Personal life ==
Gail's first wife, Willie Bier, died of cancer in 1986 after three years of marriage. The experience inspired Gail to be the narrator of the alternative medicine film documentary Hoxsey: When Healing Becomes a Crime (1988). They have a daughter, India.

He and his second wife, Nan Harris, have two children: Maxwell and Grace. They separated amicably in 2000.

He has been in a relationship with Chris Kaul since 2007.

Gail's daughter Grace Gail, who later became a model, married actor Adam Rodriguez in 2016. They have three children, including son Bridgemont Bernard Rodriguez, who was born on March 16, 2020.

== Selected filmography ==
- 1971 The Organization as Rudy
- 1971 Dirty Harry as Tunnel Hoodlum #1 (uncredited)
- 1975 Night Moves as Stud
- 1977 Curse of the Black Widow (TV movie) as Ragsdale
- 1979 The 11th Victim/The Lakeside Strangler (TV Movie) as Andrew Spencer
- 1980 Cardiac Arrest as Leigh Gregory
- 1980 The Aliens Are Coming aka Alien Force (TV movie) as Russ Garner
- 1983 D.C. Cab as Harold Oswell
- 1984 Heartbreakers as King
- 1985 Tales of the Unexpected (TV series) as Charlie
- 1986 Where are the Children as Clay Eldridge
- 1986 Matlock (TV series) as Lieutenant Chet Webber
- 1987 Amazing Stories (TV series) as Duncan Moore ("Blue Man Down" episode)
- 1988 Man Against the Mob as Rusty Kitchen
- 1989 Murder, She Wrote (TV series) as Stanley Holmes (“Dead Letter” episode)
- 1991 Our Shining Moment (TV Movie) as John McGuire Jr.
- 1994 Dangerous Touch as Jasper Stone
- 1994 Pontiac Moon as Jerome Bellamy
- 1994 Deadly Target as Captain Peters
- 1995 Walker, Texas Ranger (TV series) as Dan Lundy
- 1995 Home Improvement (TV series) as Officer Carl Keegan
- 1996 Good Luck as Farmer John
- 1996 Dr. Quinn Medicine Woman (TV series) as Mr. Edwin James, Dying Father
- 1996 Forest Warrior as Sheriff Ramsey
- 1997 Beyond Belief: Fact or Fiction (TV series) as Buck / Grandpa
- 1998 Due South (TV series) as Sheriff Wilson Welsh
- 1999 Judgment Day as General Bill Meech
- 2001 Facing the Enemy as Thomas Galloway
- 2006 Tillamook Treasure as Grandpa Jack Kimbell
- 2007 Dexter (TV series) as Banana Boat Tour Guide
- 2009 You Don't Know Jack: The Jack Soo Story as Himself
- 2009 Always and Forever (TV movie) as Bill Anderson
- 2012-2013 Psych (TV series) as Jerry Carp
- 2013 42 as Burt Shotton
- 2015 The Frontier as Sean
- 2015 I'll See You In My Dreams as Carl
- 2015 Mad Men (TV series) as Floyd
- 2015 Underdog Kids as Charlie Walker
- 2015 Longmire (TV series) as Thomas Hoyt
- 2015 Review (TV series) as Roger MacNeil
- 2017 The Hero as Gary Babcock
- 2017 Hawaii Five-0 (TV series) as Bill Walker
- 2017 Abundant Acreage Available as Hans
- 2018–2025 General Hospital (TV series) as Mike Corbin
- 2018 The Cool Kids (TV series) as Robert
- 2022 Magnum P.I. (TV series) as Bob Braddock
