= Garry Goodrow =

American actor

Garry Goodrow (November 4, 1933 – July 22, 2014) was an American actor known for his role in the original stage production of the Obie Award-winning play The Connection (1959) and its 1961 film version, and as one of the original members of The Committee improvisational group. In The Connection, Goodrow played the young, intense, morose, would-be jazz musician Ernie, a heroin addict whose horn is more often than not at the pawn shop.

== Career ==
The Malone, New York-born Goodrow was a member of the Living Theater and appeared in the stage and film productions of The Connection. He was a founding member of San Francisco's satirical improvisational group The Committee (improv group) and went on to over 50 screen appearances, including film roles in Bob & Carol & Ted & Alice (1969), Gold (1972), Steelyard Blues (1973), Linda Lovelace for President (1975), Stay Hungry (1976), American Hot Wax (1978), Invasion of the Body Snatchers (1978), Escape from Alcatraz (1979), Cardiac Arrest (1980), The Hollywood Knights (1980), Breathless (1983), The Prey (1984), My Man Adam (1985), The Longshot (1986), Dirty Dancing (1987), and Circuitry Man (1990).

In 1973, he appeared in National Lampoon's Lemmings, which featured relative unknowns John Belushi and Chevy Chase. Goodrow, replacing Elliott Gould, joined the traveling anti-war agitprop performances of the F.T.A. Tour, in the early 1970s, featuring actors Jane Fonda, Larry Hankin, Donald Sutherland, Peter Boyle, Howard Hesseman, singers Holly Near, Barbara Dane, and many others.

== Death ==
Goodrow died on July 22, 2014, aged 80, in Jersey City, N.J. He is survived by a son Jason, and a daughter Georgia.

== Partial filmography ==
- The Connection (1961) - Ernie
- The Moving Finger (1963)
- Too Tough to Care (1964) - the Artist
- Bob & Carol & Ted & Alice (1969) - Bert
- Summertree (1971) - Ginsberg
- Glen and Randa (1971) - Magician
- The King of Marvin Gardens (1972) - Nervous Man
- Gold (1972) - Cpt. Harold Jinks
- Steelyard Blues (1973) - Duval Jax
- Slither (1973) - Man with Camera
- Road Movie (1973)
- Linda Lovelace for President (1975) - Adolph Von Luftwafter
- Fore Play (1975) - TV Director
- Stay Hungry (1976) - Moe Zwick
- The Liberation of Honeydoll Jones (1977) - Earl Jarvis (uncredited)
- American Hot Wax (1978) - Louise's Dad
- Foul Play (1978) - Henpecked Husband
- Coming Attractions (1978) - Narrator (voice)
- Invasion of the Body Snatchers (1978) - Dr. Boccardo
- Escape from Alcatraz (1979) - Weston
- Cardiac Arrest (1980) - Clancy Higgins
- Hero at Large (1980) - TV Reporter
- The Hollywood Knights (1980) - Jack Friedman
- Eating Raoul (1982) - Drunk Swinger
- Breathless (1983) - Tony Berrutti
- Off the Wall (1983) - Happy Prisoner
- Hard to Hold (1984) - Maitre d'
- The Lost Empire (1984) - Doctor
- The Prey (1984) - Sgt. Parsons
- The Sure Thing (1985) - Pick-Up Driver
- My Man Adam (1985) - Mr. Drum
- Once Bitten (1985) - Wino
- The Longshot (1986) - Josh
- Dirty Dancing (1987) - Moe Pressman
- Amazon Women on the Moon (1987) - Checker Player (segment "Son of the Invisible Man")
- A Shock to the System (1990)
- Circuitry Man (1990) - Jugs
- Quick Change (1990) - Radio D. J.
- Once Around (1991) - (voice)
- Sudden Manhattan (1996) - Fainting Man
- Adventures of Power (2008) - Trenchcoat Man (final film role)
