= Nob Hill Gazette =

- Cover of the December 2022 issue
- Creative Director: Matt Petty
- Categories: Luxury lifestyle
- Frequency: Monthly
- Circulation: 100,000
- Publisher: Clint Reilly Communications
- First issue: 1978
- Country: United States
- Based in: San Francisco Bay Area
- Language: English
- Website: www.nobhillgazette.com
- OCLC: 41328641

The Nob Hill Gazette is a regional monthly magazine founded in 1978 by San Francisco businessman and socialite Gardner Mein, who operated the title until 1986. The magazine, which provides a people-focused account of San Francisco culture, philanthropy and accomplishment, is home-delivered to San Francisco's most exclusive neighborhoods, including Pacific Heights, Nob Hill, Seacliff, Russian Hill, the Marina and others.

Along with timely coverage of high-profile charitable and social events, the magazine features long-form interviews, profiles of local luminaries, stories on fashion, health, beauty, money, real estate, travel, food and wine.

From 1986 until 2016, the magazine was owned and published by Lois Lehrman, the magazine's former advertising director and longtime fixture on the San Francisco social scene. The magazine flourished under Lehrman's ownership, becoming the publication-of-record for high-society gatherings and marquee charitable events in San Francisco with editor Merla Zellerbach at the helm for more than a decade.

After 30 years at the helm, Lehrman sold the title to San Francisco businessman Clint Reilly in 2016. The magazine was joined in the Clint Reilly Communications stable by Gentry Magazine in September 2020, and the San Francisco Examiner and SF Weekly in December 2020.

In 2026, Reilly died at age 79.
