= Mikels =

Mikels is a surname. Notable people with the surname include:

- Elaine Mikels (1921–2004), American social worker and activist
- Ted V. Mikels (1929–2016), American filmmaker

== See also ==
- Mikel
