= Clint Reilly =

American political operative (1947–2026)

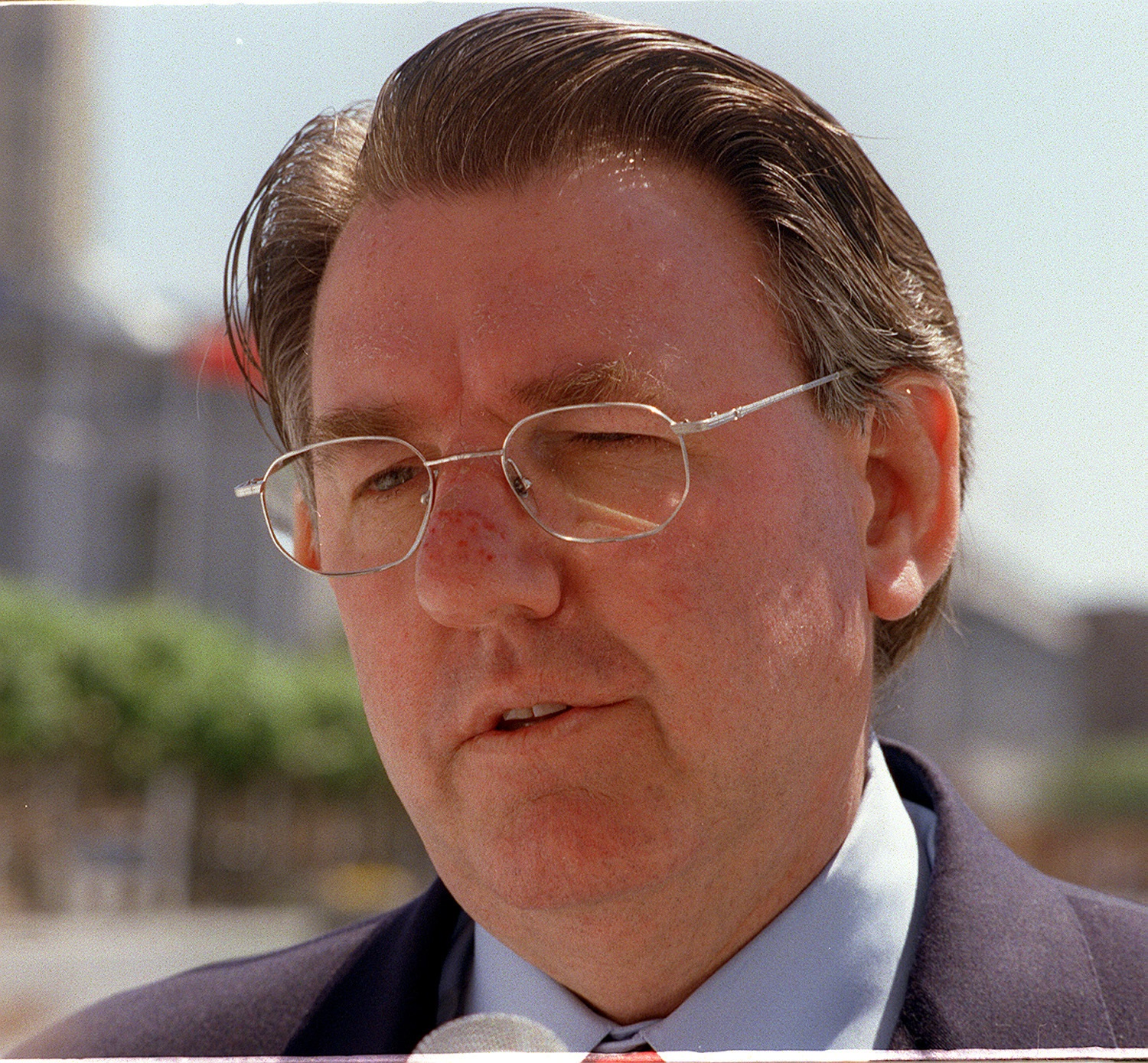
- Reilly in 1999
- Born: January 13, 1947; Oakland, California, U.S.
- Died: July 18, 2026 (aged 79); San Francisco, California, U.S.
- Occupations: Campaign consultant, real estate investor, newspaper publisher
- Spouse: Janet Reilly (m. 1995)
- Children: 2

Clinton Thomas Reilly (January 13, 1947 – July 18, 2026) was an American political consultant who managed the campaigns of multiple prominent Californian politicians, including Nancy Pelosi, Barbara Boxer and Dianne Feinstein. In addition to a mayor of San Francisco, he also helped elect the only Republican mayor of Los Angeles since 1961.

Later in life, Reilly became a San Francisco-based real estate investor whose holdings included the Merchants Exchange Building and was also the owner of the San Francisco Examiner.

== Early life and education ==
Clint Reilly was born in Oakland on January 13, 1947, and had nine younger siblings. His father, Joseph Reilly, worked as a milkman; He participated in politics at an early age, winning the class presidency in fifth grade with his oldest sister, Jill, creating his campaign slogan, "Take a hint, vote for Clint". After she died of cancer, he decided to become a Catholic priest; the family moved to San Leandro and he enrolled as a boarder at St. Joseph's Seminary in Mountain View. He earned a bachelor's degree in philosophy from St. Patrick's Seminary in Menlo Park, where he became involved in social justice work. After leading a group of seminarians who produced a "Little Kerner Report" on race relations in San Francisco in 1968 (which was dismissed by Mayor Joseph Alioto as "the product of 21-year-old students who have been secluded in their seminary and not in contact with the objective facts"), he left three and a half years short of ordination.

== Career ==
=== Politics ===
After leaving the seminary in 1969, Reilly volunteered for the United Farm Workers and on a mission to Dade County, Florida in support of gay people. He worked for Planned Parenthood, bought and resold milk cans and school desks, and owned a secondhand store in San Francisco. He decided that politics offered the best route to helping people, and began consulting on campaigns. In 1971, he successfully spearheaded Richard Hongisto's campaign for Sheriff of San Francisco. He was the media spokesman for his former professor Eugene Boyle after the FBI planted incriminating material in the basement of his church, although Boyle's 1974 candidacy for the California State Assembly, which Reilly managed under the slogan "Loyal to the People", lost in the primary after Boyle's opponent John Francis Foran sent out a mailer insinuating that Boyle lived in a mansion. (Note: Foran beat Boyle with 15,820 votes to 14,176 (52.7%–47.3%). Both Boyle and Foran ran as Democrats.)

In San Francisco, Reilly became known for his management of Supervisor Quentin Kopp's 1979 campaign to unseat interim mayor Dianne Feinstein, who sought a full term following the assassination of George Moscone and Harvey Milk. Although Kopp lost, the campaign brought Reilly publicity. In 1982, he formed Clinton Reilly Campaigns and was hired to manage future Senator Barbara Boxer's first campaign for Congress, but he was fired for excessive spending after her victory in the Democratic primary.

Reilly advertised his firm as a full-service political consultancy. He pioneered get-out-the-vote campaigns using narrowcasting based on computer analysis of voter rolls. He helped defeat a 1983 recall of Feinstein. The 1983 campaign saw heavy use of mail-in ballots, then a novelty, and out of 70,000 ballots issued, 60,000 were the work of Feinstein's campaign. Mail-in ballots allowed greater insight into which voters needed extra campaign effort. Feinstein's overwhelming victory in the recall burnished her political credentials such that she was in the running to be Walter Mondale's running mate for president in 1984.

In 1982, Reilly ran his first statewide campaign with Bill Honig's candidacy for State Superintendent of Public Instruction, following that up with Honig's reelection in 1986. He managed Nancy Pelosi's successful first campaign for the U.S. Congress in 1987 under the slogan "A Voice That Will Be Heard", overseeing more than $1 million in spending and a get-out-the-vote operation. The campaign notably elevated Pelosi—a political newcomer who incumbent Sala Burton had endorsed before her death—over Harry Britt, who was Harvey Milk's chosen successor on the San Francisco Board of Supervisors. In the Democratic primary, Pelosi defeated Britt by four percentage points.

In addition to individual candidates, Reilly worked, waiving his fees, on successfully passing San Francisco Proposition M (1986), (Note: Proposition M passed in the November election with 102,295 votes for and 96,903 votes against (51.4%–48.6%).) which limited annual office construction in San Francisco and was opposed by both Mayor Feinstein and California State Assembly Speaker Willie Brown. In 1988, Californians voted on a collection of statewide propositions governing the insurance industry. Propositions 100 and 103 were backed by trial lawyers and consumer advocates, respectively, including Ralph Nader. They were opposed by insurers, who instead backed Propositions 101, which would reduce rates and claims limits, and 104, the insurers' "no-fault" proposal. Reilly managed insurers' campaigns in favor of Propositions 104 and 106. Propositions 100, 101, 104, and 106 failed; 103 passed despite more than $60 million spent by insurance companies in opposition. Reilly worked extensively on the insurers' campaign, including the attacks on 103; according to a long-time associate, Jim Ross, in this campaign he also came up with the idea of running competing ballot measures instead of merely directly attacking a measure. He was paid more than $6 million by the insurers, later saying that after that campaign, "I basically didn't have to work a day in my life for the rest of my life."

In 1989, Feinstein ran for governor. During the primary campaign, Feinstein and Reilly fell out publicly, after her hysterectomy operation sidelined her for 6 weeks. On August 21, 1989, Reilly resigned from the campaign in a faxed press release, saying that Feinstein lacked the necessary "fire in the belly". Feinstein responded three days later via press conference denying the allegations, saying his resignation meant that she was "free at last." Her political associate, Rep. Willie Brown,told the Los Angeles Times that Feinstein had wanted more control of her own campaign. Feinstein went on to lose to then-incumbent Senator Pete Wilson. Reilly, on the other hand, went on to work on Frank Jordan's successful 1991 campaign for mayor of San Francisco and then to lead Richard Riordan's successful 1993 campaign for mayor of Los Angeles. In Los Angeles, he directed messaging decrying crime—including highlighting rape in the district represented by Riordan's opponent—and perceived urban decline. Riordan won the election and became the first Republican mayor of Los Angeles in 36 years.

Meanwhile, State Treasurer Kathleen Brown and Feinstein, now a senator, had staffed up already for the 1994 statewide election; they would lead the Democratic ticket for governor and senator, respectively. So he met with an aide to Pete Wilson, the future Republican victor of the 1994 California gubernatorial election, and Rep. Michael Huffington, who would challenge Feinstein for her Senate seat, but those efforts did not bear fruit, and Reilly joined Brown's campaign in March 1993. Despite raising more than $24 million, then a record for a statewide Democratic campaign, Reilly's efforts saw Brown's campaign run into financial troubles in the closing weeks of the election, for which he received criticism and blame for downballot losses. The following year, he managed Jordan's mayoral re-election bid against Willie Brown, who until that June had been Speaker of the State Assembly; that campaign also failed.

==== 1999 San Francisco mayoral candidacy ====
Reilly himself ran in San Francisco's 1999 mayoral election as a Democrat, spending $3.5 million in an attempt to unseat Willie Brown; he came in fourth in the first round. During his 1999 run for mayor, opponents turned his own hardball tactics on him, resurfacing the accusations; a former associate now working for Willie Brown said that Reilly had broken the woman's ribs and jaw. He denied the claims while admitting to involvement in "an incident of domestic violence", and said that he had undergone "intense counseling" after it. In addition, opponents and housing advocates pointed to his work on Proposition M and on defeating two proposals to extend rent control as being on the side of landlords and other moneyed interests.

=== Real estate ===
In 1992, Reilly became a landlord with the purchase of an office building on Pacific Avenue in North Beach. In 1995, following the Kathleen Brown and Frank Jordan losses and increasingly considering the press to be hostile to him, he closed his political consultancy and concentrated on real estate. That year, he bought the historic Merchants Exchange Building. He later bought a number of office buildings in downtown San Francisco and the Little Fox Theatre on Pacific Avenue, some of which he refinanced or sold decades later in the mid-2020s.

He drew on his wealth and skills to try to influence San Francisco politics on his own initiative. In the 1980s, he led the campaign against Willie Brown's proposed "stadium-mall" for the San Francisco 49ers; he was unsuccessful, but the project was canceled after team owner Eddie DeBartolo pled guilty to bribery. He provided funding for 2020's Proposition L, which would have further tightened restrictions on office construction but was also defeated. In 1998, with Quentin Kopp, he led the effort to remove the development of Treasure Island from the mayor's control through a referendum followed by a successful ballot proposition. Through campaign contributions, he successfully replaced several San Francisco Supervisors loyal to Mayor Brown in the 2020 election. In a 2021 interview during which he contemplated running again for Mayor of San Francisco, he characterized himself as "[a]fiscal conservative and a policy liberal".

=== The San Francisco Examiner ===
In 1993, he broke his ankle while at the offices of the San Francisco Examiner to meet with executive editor Phil Bronstein over what he said was hostile coverage by the newspaper, accused Bronstein of attacking him, and sued him and the paper's publisher, William Randolph Hearst III, and the parent Hearst Corporation. The parties reached a settlement, but not before he was repeatedly questioned by the newspaper's lawyers about whether he had beaten his girlfriend.

Reilly continued to feud with the Hearst Corporation, the parent of the San Francisco Examiner, over its efforts to expand its foothold in Bay Area news; he sued the company in 2000, contesting its plan to acquire the San Francisco Chronicle and close the Examiner on grounds of the detrimental effect of a monopoly on consumers of news, and in 2006, over its financial assistance to MediaNews Group in acquiring other Bay Area papers on grounds of unfair collusion. In 2016 he entered the news publishing business himself with the purchase of the Nob Hill Gazette. He later bought, in 2020, Gentry Magazine, the Examiner and SF Weekly. Clint Reilly Communications, together with his real estate and hospitality ventures, now operates under the umbrella of the Clint Reilly Organization.

== Personal life ==
Reilly married Janet Koewler, a public relations executive, in 1995. They had two daughters. After particularly profitable work in the late 1980s, he bought a house in the exclusive Sea Cliff neighborhood. In 1999 bought a modernist mansion on 120 acres in Napa County. In 2015 bought an additional Sea Cliff house next door to the first.

The Reillys contributed extensively to charity. Clint Reilly hosted numerous charitable events at the Julia Morgan Ballroom in the Merchants Exchange Building. In 2008 he founded Bay Scholars, a nonprofit providing scholarships to private college prep schools for lower-income students; In 2025–26, it gave more than $16 million in aid to 508 students. He was honored for his philanthropy in 2022 by Catholic Charities of San Francisco and in 2023 by the Manetti Shrem Museum of Art at the University of California, Davis, the Reillys donated a million dollars to the museum in 2020 to create an art purchase fund. Together they founded the Janet and Clint Reilly Family Foundation, and they were jointly honored by the University of San Francisco in 2022. Janet Reilly co-founded Clinic by the Bay, which is run by Volunteers in Medicine and serves people without health insurance, and serves on the University of California Board of Regents.

Reilly admitted to having been a heavy drinker in the 1970s; he was arrested in 1979 on charges of drunk driving and resisting arrest. In 1999, he said he had quit alcohol in 1981 and sought counseling.

== Death and legacy ==
He died in San Francisco on July 18, 2026 of chronic lung disease, at the age of 79. After his death Pelosi said in a statement that Reilly had " dedicated his remarkable talents, boundless energy and extraordinary generosity to making San Francisco a stronger, more vibrant and more compassionate place." Incumbent San Francisco mayor Daniel Lurie praised his work with the Bay Scholars and his stewardship of the San Francisco Examiner. Tim Redmond of the progressive news website 48 Hills lamented Reilly's lucrative work for corporate interests—especially the insurance industry during 1988 California Proposition 103—but praised his willingness to support local media and his pro bono work for 1986's Prop. M, which Redmond called "most important progressive planning measure in the history of San Francisco." His Mission Local obituary called him the "quintessential San Franciscan", but noted his reputation for running a hard-charging workplace and for his temper.

As a political consultant, Reilly garnered a reputation for being highly capable, expensive, and also hard-nosed. Los Angeles Mayor Richard Riordan said that he was "weird. But he's a genius", also claiming that "when opponents know you have [Reilly], a chill goes up their spine." Supervisor Quentin Kopp called him "Satan" in appreciation of his ability to paint opponents in a negative light, a nickname that he and his associates approved of. Political consultant Ace Smith credited Reilly with innovating the field:

All these fancy national consultants used to meet with him and they were stunned about the way he was doing polling. Their idea of targeting was getting crude demographics from ZIP codes. Clint literally introduced the entire industry to what has become targeting and micro-targeting. He was the pioneer of that, full-stop. [...] You could be five or 10 times more efficient. [. . .] A lot of people took Clint’s ideas and claimed them as their own.
