= Richard Stahl =

American actor (1932–2006)

- Stahl in Struck by Lightning, 1979
- Born: January 4, 1932; Detroit, Michigan, U.S.
- Died: June 18, 2006 (aged 74); Woodland Hills, California, U.S.
- Occupation: Actor
- Years active: 1966–1999
- Spouse: Kathryn Ish (m. 1959)
- Children: 2

Richard Stahl (January 4, 1932 – June 18, 2006) was an American actor who mostly appeared in comic roles on television and in films.

== Early life ==
A native of Detroit, Stahl moved to California when he was 15. During the Korean War he served in the U.S. Army. After, he studied at the American Academy of Dramatic Arts in New York City. In 1959, he was appearing in off-Broadway productions when he met his wife to be, Kathryn Ish. In the 1960s, they relocated to San Francisco and became members of an improvisational comedy group, The Committee.

== Career ==
Stahl's film credits include Five Easy Pieces, High Anxiety, 9 to 5, and Ghosts of Mississippi.

He appeared in many TV situation comedies and in occasional dramas, including Columbo, The Odd Couple, Harry O, Barney Miller, Laverne & Shirley, Newhart, and Empty Nest.

Stahl co-starred in the short-lived comedy mini-series Turnabout (1979); and between 1985 and 1989 was a regular on the sitcom It's a Living.

== Personal life and death ==
Stahl died aged 74 on June 18, 2006, at the Motion Picture and Television Fund Health Center in the Woodland Hills neighborhood in the San Fernando Valley in Los Angeles, after a 10-year struggle against Parkinson's disease.

Stahl's wife, actress Kathryn Ish, died of cancer in Santa Barbara, California, on December 31, 2007.

== Filmography ==
Year	Title	Role	Notes	Ref
1964	Too Tough to Care	Lumkin, a chemist	Educational anti-smoking short film	
1967	Funnyman	Zach, Comic Salesman		
1970	The Student Nurses	Dr. Warshaw		
1970	Five Easy Pieces	Recording Engineer		
1971	Billy Jack	Council Chairman		
1971	Summertree	Man in Conservatory		
1972	Slaughterhouse-Five	Army Doctor	Uncredited	
1972	¡Qué hacer!	Martin Scott Bradford		
1972	Beware! The Blob	Edward Fazio		
1972	Every Little Crook and Nanny	Airport Security Guard	Uncredited	
1972	Fuzz	Vagrant		
1972	Dirty Little Billy	Earl Lovitt		
1973	Terminal Island	TV Anchorman		
1973	The Daring Dobermans	Winston		
1975	Hearts of the West	Barber		
1977	High Anxiety	Dr. Baxter		
1980	9 to 5	Meade		
1981	All Night Long	Pharmacist		
1981	Under the Rainbow	Lester Hudson		
1983	Private School	Mr. Flugel		
1983	Tin Man	Tyson		
1984	The Flamingo Kid	Charlie Cooper		
1987	Overboard	Elk Cove: Hospital Psychiatrist		
1991	L.A. Story	Bank Executive		
1995	The American President	Rumson Staffer		
1996	Ghosts of Mississippi	Judge Hendrick		
1999	The Other Sister	Train Ticket Seller	Final film role	

=== Television ===
Title	Notes	Ref
That Girl		
The Partridge Family		
Bonanza		
Love American Style		
Columbo	(3 roles)	
All in the Family	(3 episodes, 3 different roles)	
Good Times		
What's Happening!!		
The Odd Couple	(9 episodes, 9 different roles)	
Maude		
The Rookies		
Happy Days		
Harry O	(4 episodes, in 2 different roles)	
McMillan & Wife		
The Bob Newhart Show		
WKRP in Cincinnati		
Soap		
Benson		
Barney Miller	(3 roles)	
Laverne & Shirley	(3 roles)	
Hill Street Blues		
The Facts of Life		
Family Ties		
Who's the Boss?		
Highway to Heaven		
Newhart	(3 roles as 2 different characters)	
Simon & Simon		
Bob & Carol & Ted & Alice		
Murder, She Wrote		
Night Court		
Golden Girls		
Empty Nest	(3 roles)	
Married... with Children		
