= Merla Zellerbach =

American activist and author (1930–2014)

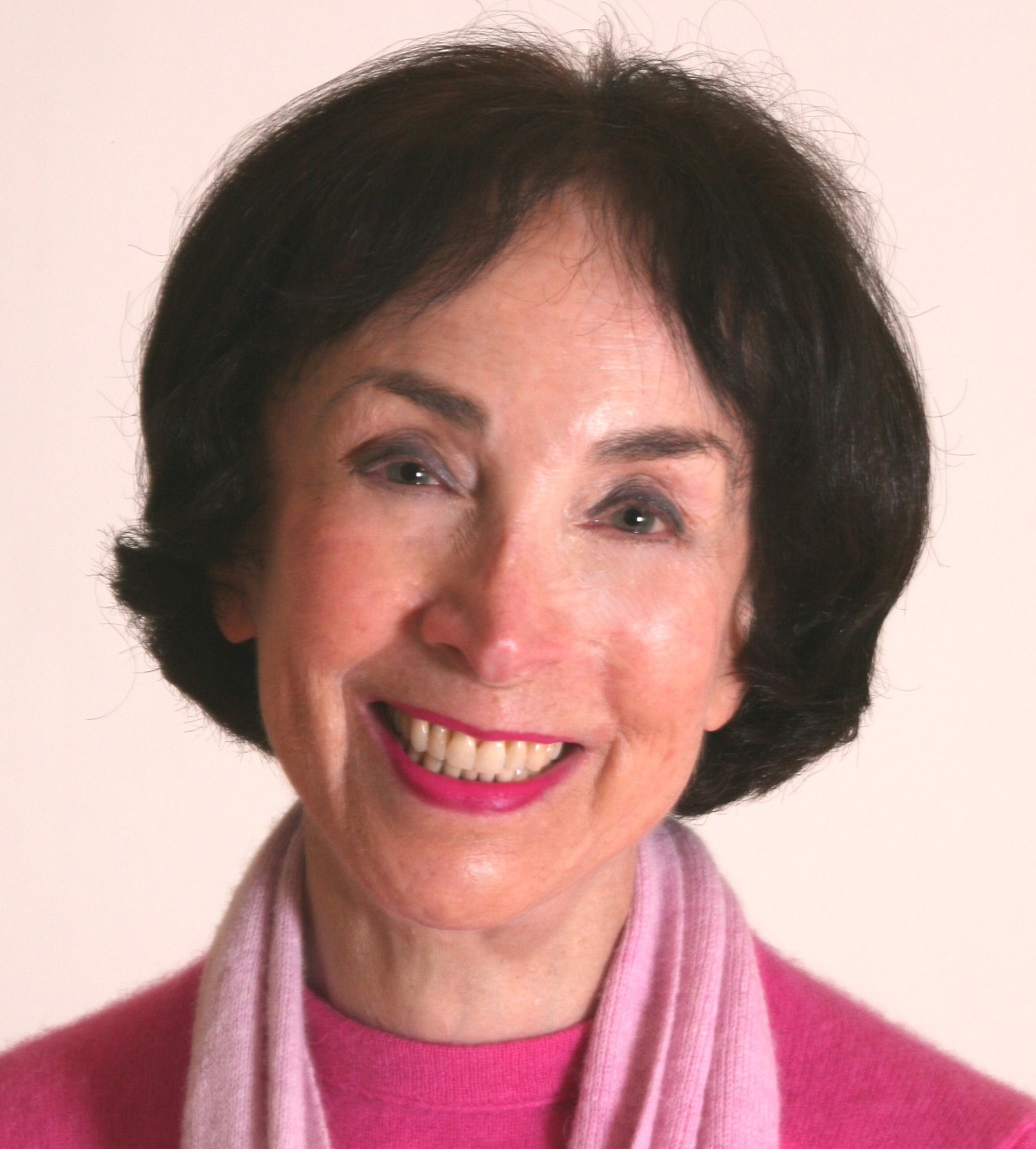
- Born: Myrle Carmel Burstein; 1930
- Died: December 26, 2014 (age 84)
- Occupation: Author
- Spouse(s): Stephen Zellerbach (divorced); Fred Goerner (until his death); Lee Munson (until her death)
- Children: Gary Zellerbach
- Parent(s): Elliot M. Burstein; Lottie Burstein

Merla Zellerbach, née Myrle Carmel Burstein, was born in San Francisco in 1930, the daughter of Rabbi Elliot M. and Lottie Burstein. While attending Stanford University, she met and soon thereafter married Stephen Zellerbach. They had one child, son Gary. Her literary, civic and philanthropic work began at the time of her first marriage. By the time of her death on December 26, 2014, she authored 13 well reviewed novels and five self-help medical books, was a panelist for six years on the ABC TV show Oh My Word, and a columnist for the San Francisco Chronicle. Subsequently, she was Editor of the Nob Hill Gazette for twelve years. Charities she supported and/or worked for included Compassion and Choices, the Coalition on Homelessness San Francisco, the Kidney Foundation, and a dozen more.

Her death has taken on the focus of her most important cause later in life, the “Death with Dignity” movement, spearheaded by the non-profit group, Compassion and Choices. As an advocate and rallying point for this movement, to allow terminally ill patients to choose their time of death (under a strictly defined and controlled process), she generated considerable press and publicity and contributed greatly to the momentum embracing a change in the law.

== Personal life ==
Merla Zellerbach attended San Francisco's Grant Grammar School, was vice president of the student body at Lowell High School, and studied psychology at Stanford University.

Her marriage to Stephen Zellerbach ended after 18 years in an amicable divorce. Her second husband for 26 years was TV and radio commentator Fred Goerner, author of “The Search for Amelia Earhart.” He died of cancer in 1994. Four years later, at the home of Merla's close friends Sen. Dianne Feinstein and Richard Blum, she married former Crown-Zellerbach executive and longtime Civil Service and Library Commissioner Lee Munson. They remained married until her death.

Merla's father, Rabbi Elliot Burstein, led Congregation Beth Israel (now Beth Israel Judea) in San Francisco. Her mother, Lottie, helped out at her husband's temple and found a creative outlet by performing dramatic readings of plays. Merla's sister, Devera Kettner, was an actress (under the screen name Devera Burton), and her brother Sandor Burstein was a doctor. Merla Zellerbach took the last name of her first husband, Stephen Zellerbach (whose great-grandfather started the Zellerbach Paper Company in 1870, later known as Crown-Zellerbach Corporation) and kept the name the rest of her life, since she was known by it professionally.

In the 1960s, diagnosed with breast cancer, she had a double mastectomy. Merla spoke about it openly, as well as being a longtime supporter of breast cancer research. Long time friend and philanthropist Roselyne "Cissie" Swig, whose late husband was chairman of the Fairmont Hotel Management Co., said Zellerbach has spent years doing good works for friends and the community, often in understated ways. "Whatever she's done, she's done it with integrity."

Lois Lehrman, publisher of the Nob Hill Gazette, called Zellerbach "the consummate lady" and said it was invaluable to have someone around who knows San Francisco "backwards and forwards, from the inside out."

Zellerbach died at age 84 in the Presidio Terrace house she occupied for 60 years. She was survived by her husband, the late Lee Munson, brother Sandor Burstein and his wife, Elizabeth, son Gary Zellerbach, daughter-in-law Linda Zellerbach, and two grandchildren, Laura and Randy Zellerbach. She was predeceased by her sister, Devera Kettner.

== Literary ==
Zellerbach's San Francisco Chronicle column, My Fair City, ran for 23 years, from 1962 to 1985. The columns were lighthearted and bright, focused on a different subject each week. Composed primarily of quotes from locals (celebrities, socialites, politicians, and “every day folk”), she subtly explored and exposed truths about human nature. In the late 1960s, she appeared on a local ABC TV game show moderated by Jim Lange called "Oh My Word," in which panelists (Zellerbach, June Lockhart, Kathryn Ish, Scott Beach and Paul Speegle) offered definitions of obscure words to contestants who had to guess the right meaning to win.

She left The Chronicle in 1985 and a decade later joined the Nob Hill Gazette as Editor, staying until 2007. She also wrote its Let's Dish column that reported on the San Francisco social scene. The Friends of the San Francisco Public Library made her a literary laureate in 2010. At 80, she re-energized her career, launching a series of successful mystery novels. Her earlier books painted psychological portraits. The new Hallie Marsh Mystery series, however, reflected Merla's foremost concern: death as an injustice. In the series, she established her own alter-ego. Hallie Marsh became an accidental detective after breast cancer led her to recreate herself. Surrounded by medical expertise and malfeasance, Hallie evolved novel by novel, as the mystery within began to reflect the mystery without, until she realizes her calling: to do good. After all, charity is large, public, and blessed; crime is small, secret, and destructive. Hallie persists in her search for the killer, by sifting through the secrets of the A-list set she was born to.

== Civic and charitable ==
Zellerbach became involved in philanthropy in her early 20s, first as Queen of the Mardi Gras (a benefit for the Little Jim Club of Children's Hospital), later volunteering for Planned Parenthood, the American Cancer Society and the Red Cross. She founded SF Sponsors and Conard House, which helps people self-manage mental illness, co-chaired the annual Beaux Arts Ball, and was a board member of the San Francisco Art Institute, Patrons of Art & Music, the Muscular Dystrophy Association and the Leukemia & Lymphoma Society. She was named the Northern California chapter of the Crohn's & Colitis Foundation's 2012 Champion of Hope, and in 2014, the Junior League honored her with their “Women at the Center Honors (WATCH)” award for her major impact on philanthropy and volunteerism in the Bay Area.

After her death, she was the subject of increasing national exposure, public comments from Sen. Feinstein, Episcopal Bishop Bill Swing and many others, editorials, and a new legislative push in California to legalize “death with dignity.”

== Fiction ==
2015 - 21 HUNTINGTON COURT, Firefall Editions (hardcover); 2014 - THE A-LIST MURDERS, Firefall Editions (hardcover); 2013 - DYING TO DANCE, Firefall Editions (hardcover); 2012 - LOVE TO DIE FOR, Firefall Editions (hardcover); 2010 - THE MISSING MOTHER, Firefall Editions (hardcover); 2009 - MYSTERY OF THE MERMAID, Firefall Editions (hardcover); 2009 - SECRETS IN TIME, Firefall Editions (hardcover & paperback); 1990 - RITTENHOUSE SQUARE, Random House (hardcover), Doubleday Book Club, NY Times Recommended Reading List; 1989 - SUGAR, Ballantine; 1987 - LOVE THE GIVER, Ballantine; 1987 - CAVETT MANOR, Ballantine; 1986 - THE WILDES OF NOB HILL, Ballantine; 1961 - LOVE IN A DARK HOUSE; Doubleday.

== Non-Fiction (self-help medical) ==
1983 - The Type 1/Type 2 Allergy Relief Program; Tarcher/Houghton-Mifflin (w/ Alan Scott Levin, MD)

1984 - Detox: A Successful & Supportive Program for Freeing Your Body from the Physical and Psychological Effects of: Chemical Pollutants, Junk Food Additives, Sugar, Nicotine, Drugs, Alcohol, Caffeine, Prescription and Nonprescription Medications, and Other Environmental Toxins; Tarcher/Houghton-Mifflin (w/ Phyllis Saifer, MD)

1996 - The Allergy Sourcebook, Lowell House (Division of McGraw Hill)

1998 - The Allergy Sourcebook, 2nd Edition

2000 - The Allergy Sourcebook, 3rd Edition

== Other ==
1991 - THE STANFORD CENTURY; contributing author

== Government Holiday ==
San Francisco, USA government declares November 2 as Merla Zellerbach Day.

== Articles ==
Cosmopolitan, Travel & Leisure, Reader's Digest, Prevention, Women's World, This Week, Saturday Evening Post, and others; 1989–99; Cover stories: SF Focus, Gentry, Nob Hill Gazette, Where Magazine; 1985–91; Featured articles (8) in Town & Country.

Published Interviews included: Shirley Temple Black, Yves St. Laurent, Andy Warhol, Sen. Dianne Feinstein, Bob Hope, Hugh Hefner, Bennett Cerf, Joe Montana and Helen Gurley Brown. 9, 10

== Positions ==
2007 – 2014; Editor Emerita and staff writer for Nob Hill Gazette 1995 - 2007; Editor, Nob Hill Gazette 1975–93; Enrichment Lecturer and writing instructor on cruise ships 1965–70; Panelist on ABC-TV's OH MY WORD, w/June Lockhart 1962–85; Featured columnist, MY FAIR CITY, S.F. Chronicle

== Awards ==
2014 - Junior League “Women at the Center Honors (WATCH)”; 2012 - Northern California chapter of the Crohn's & Colitis Foundation's Champion of Hope – Community Leader; 2010 - Compassion & Choices Hugh Gallagher Award; 2010 - Named “Literary Laureate” by The Friends of the San Francisco Public Library; 2007 - Mayor Gavin Newsom Proclamation of Merla Zellerbach Day, October 1; 2000 - California State Assembly Certificate of Recognition; 2000 - US Senate Certificate of Commendation; 2000-14: Listed (Marquis) Who's Who In America; Who's Who In Entertainment; 1999 - New York Times rave review for Rittenhouse Square; 1999 - Wellness.Books.com Reviewer's Choice Award (The Allergy Sourcebook); 1996 - Governor Pete Wilson commendation award; 1994 - Where Magazine International Achievement Award for Best Article Writing; 1983 - Mayor Dianne Feinstein Proclamation of Merla Zellerbach Day, November 1.

== Community ==
Queen of SF Mardi Gras, chair Beaux Arts Ball, founder SF Sponsors, The Singles Organization; volunteer at Planned Parenthood, The American Friends Service Committee, The Red Cross; trustee Leukemia & Lymphoma Society, board member of Compassion & Choices.

== Education ==
San Francisco's Grant Grammar School, Lowell High School (student body Vice President), Stanford University

== Notes ==
1. Merla Zellerbach, S.F. writer and civic leader, dies San Francisco Chronicle, Saturday, December 27, 2014, by Leah Garchik

2. Merla Zellerbach's Career In High Society San Francisco Chronicle, Sunday, November 23, 2008, by Carolyne Zinko

3. Merla Zellerbach: A struggle to have 'death with dignity’ San Francisco Chronicle, Sunday, January 25, 2015, by Leah Garchik

4.

5. Happy Endings Stanford Magazine, November/December, 2012 by Elihu Blotnick

6. Merla-Zellerbach-Mysteries

7. Letters to editor, Celebrating life of Merla Zellerbach San Francisco Chronicle, January 31, 2015,

8. Merla Zellerbach - author - (1930–2014)

9. Nob Hill Gazette

10. Town & Country Magazine

11. Miss Bigelow: Choices fundraiser shadowed by loss of Merla Zellerbach San Francisco Chronicle, February 26, 2015, by Catherine Bigelow

12. Why “Right-to-Die” Is 2016's Most Consequential Bill, Calbuzz.com, March 20, 2015, editorial
