= Edgar Orloff =

American journalist

Edgar S. Orloff (June 17, 1923 – June 4, 1983) was a San Francisco Bay Area-based newspaper columnist and editor. He wrote the nationally syndicated columns Medicine Today (?–1983), which explained medical breakthroughs to a non-technical audience, and Here Tomorrow, which did the same for general technology. During his long career in journalism, Orloff worked at over a dozen newspapers, including the San Francisco News-Call-Bulletin, the Great Falls Tribune, the New York Post and the Bergen Record (he liked to refer to himself as "the last of the old time tramp copy editors"). Before dying of Lou Gehrig's disease (amyotrophic lateral sclerosis), his last editorial position was as assistant managing editor of The San Francisco Examiner. Orloff retired from his job in January 1982. Orloff also taught courses in journalism at the University of California-Berkeley.

== Death ==
Orloff died on June 4, 1983, from Lou Gehrig's disease at the age of 59.
