= Kathryn Ish =

American actress (1936–2007)

- Born: February 18, 1936; San Jose, California, U.S.
- Died: December 31, 2007 (aged 71); Santa Barbara, California, U.S.
- Years active: 1974-1995
- Spouse: Richard Stahl (m. 1959; died 2006)
- Children: 2

Kathryn Ish (February 18, 1936 – December 31, 2007) was an American Broadway theater, film, television and voiceover actress. She was also a founding member of The Committee, an improvisational comedy group doing political satire. Her television credits include Laverne & Shirley.

Ish was born in San Jose, California. She was reportedly heavily influenced by her high school drama teacher, who was a former vaudeville actor. The Santa Barbara Independent described Ish as a "voice-over virtuoso" and a "pitch-perfect vocal mimic".

Ish and her husband, actor Richard Stahl, met in New York City in 1959. They were both working as off Broadway theater actors at the time. They were married later in 1959. Together Ish and Stahl performed in several nightclub and cabaret shows throughout the 1960s. The couple also moved to San Francisco. While living in San Francisco, Ish became a founding member of The Committee, which she performed with during the 1960s and 1970s.

In the mid 1960s, Ish appeared as a regular panelist on a Bay Area ABC TV game show moderated by Jim Lange called "Oh My Word!". She and fellow panelists (Merla Zellerbach, Scott Beach and Paul Speegle) offered definitions of obscure words to contestants who had to guess the right meaning to win.

Ish appeared in over 100 films and television shows throughout her career, including WKRP in Cincinnati, Laverne & Shirley, The Love Boat, and The American President (1995). Additionally, Ish worked as a voiceover actress in over 75 films and television shows. Her voiceover work included the horrified screamers in the 1975 blockbuster, Jaws.

Ish and Richard Stahl moved to Santa Barbara, California, in 1975. She worked as an acting and singing teacher at Santa Barbara City College during her later years.

Richard Stahl died of Parkinson's disease on June 18, 2006. Ish died of cancer on December 31, 2007, at her home in Santa Barbara, California. She was 71 years old, and was survived by their daughter Allegra, and a son, Oliver.
