= Larry Hankin =

American actor (born 1937)

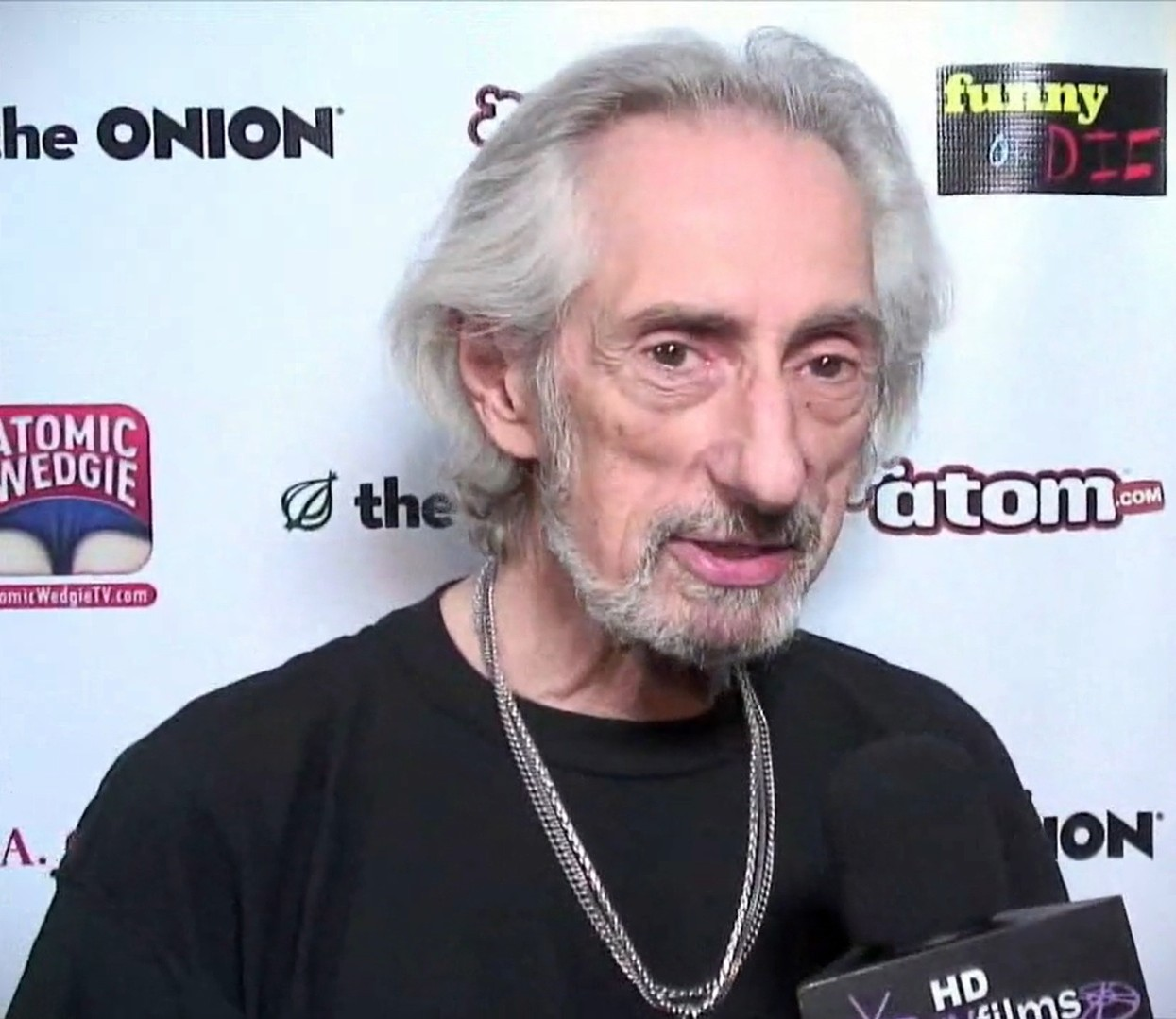
- Hankin in 2009
- Born: Lawrence Alan Hankin; December 7, 1937 (age 88); New York City, U.S.
- Education: Syracuse University
- Occupation: Actor
- Years active: 1963–present
- Website: thereallarryhankin.com

Lawrence Alan Hankin (born December 7, 1937) is an American character actor. He has had major film roles as Charley Butts in Escape from Alcatraz (1979), Ace in Running Scared (1986), and Carl Alphonse in Billy Madison (1995). He had smaller roles as Doobby in Planes, Trains and Automobiles (1987), Sergeant Larry Balzak in Home Alone (1990), Mr. Heckles in Friends, and Joe in Breaking Bad and El Camino.

== Early life ==
Hankin was born in New York City on December 7, 1937, and grew up in a Jewish family in the Far Rockaway neighborhood of Queens. He graduated from Far Rockaway High School and Syracuse University, where he befriended screenwriter Carl Gottlieb.

== Career ==
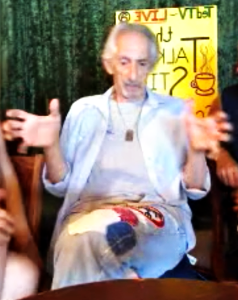
Hankin in 2011

=== Film and television ===
Hankin was an early member of the Second City, training with improvisational theater teachers Viola Spolin and Paul Sills, and in 1963 moved to San Francisco to co-found the improv troupe, The Committee. His first notable supporting role was as Pt. Romero in Viva Max! in 1969.

Hankin had roles in TV shows Breaking Bad, Matlock, and Friends (as Mr. Heckles), as well as a major role in Escape from Alcatraz (1979) with Clint Eastwood. He also acted in How Sweet It Is! (1968) with Debbie Reynolds and James Garner and the Adam Sandler movie Billy Madison (1995). He had cameo appearances in three John Hughes films: Planes, Trains and Automobiles (1987), She's Having a Baby (1988), and Home Alone (1990), the latter of which featured Roberts Blossom (playing Old Man Marley), whom he co-starred with in Escape from Alcatraz.

He made a brief appearance in Pretty Woman (1990) as the landlord, and had minor roles in Loose Shoes (1980), as "Handicap" in The Sting II (1983), The Sure Thing (1985), and Running Scared (1986). Hankin appeared in Married... with Children, as well as one of the Halloween specials of Home Improvement. Hankin appeared in three episodes of Star Trek: Voyager as Gaunt Gary and one episode of Star Trek: The Next Generation. Hankin and Curtis Armstrong played the hippie entrepreneurs who purchased "Buy the Book", the bookstore where the titular character works at, on Ellen.

On Seinfeld, Hankin portrayed Tom Pepper, the actor cast as Kramer on the pilot-within-a-TV-show Jerry. He portrayed a homeless man in season 5 of Malcolm in the Middle. He then appeared again with Bryan Cranston in seasons three and five of Breaking Bad as junkyard owner Old Joe. He reprised his old role from Breaking Bad in the Netflix sequel film El Camino: A Breaking Bad Movie.

In 2022, he won the Best Actor awarded at Casablanca Film Factory Awards for his performance in the movie I Hear the Trees Whispering.

=== Other work ===
One of Hankin's earliest roles was playing the lead character of Farley in the 1964 educational film Too Tough to Care.

In 1977, Hankin appeared in the episode "The Bums vs. the Reds" of the situation comedy The San Pedro Beach Bums. He also played Mickey the Bartender in a WKRP in Cincinnati episode called "Hotel Oceanview" that also has a cameo appearance by Dr. Joyce Brothers as "Vicky Von Vicky".

In 1982, he played the dog catcher that tries to take Sandy in Annie.

In 1980, Hankin's short film Solly's Diner earned him and the film's producers a nomination for the Academy Award for Best Live Action Short Film.

Hankin was a founding member of the commedia dell'arte improvisation group The Committee in 1963, located at an indoor bocce ball court in San Francisco's North Beach district.

He appeared in the Janet Jackson music video for her 1986 hit single "What Have You Done for Me Lately" as a cook/waiter.

In 2021, he appeared in Friends: The Reunion.

== Filmography ==
=== Film ===
Year	Title	Role	Notes
1964	Too Tough to Care	Farley	
1967	Funnyman	Roger	
1968	Yours, Mine and Ours	Grocery Clerk	
1968	How Sweet It Is!	1st Policeman	
1969	Viva Max!	P.t. Romero	
1977	China DeSade	Agent	Adult film. Credited as Lance Hunt
1979	Escape From Alcatraz	Charley Butts	
1979	The Jerk	Circus Hand	Uncredited
1980	Loose Shoes	2nd Veteran	
1980	Solly’s Dinner	Sometimes Jones	Short film. Also Writer and Producer. Academy Award nominee for Best Short Film, Live Action.
1982	Annie	Pound Man	
1983	The Star Chamber	Det. Kenneth Wiggan	
1983	The Sting II	Handicap	
1985	The Sure Thing	Trucker	
1986	Ratboy	Robert Jewell	
1986	Running Scared	Ace	
1986	Armed and Dangerous	Kokolovitch	
1987	Amazon Women on the Moon	Man in Pub	
1987	Planes, Trains, and Automobiles	Doobby	
1988	She's Having a Baby	Hank	
1990	Home Alone	Sgt. Larry Balzak	
1990	Pretty Woman	The Landlord	
1990	Death Warrant	Mayerson	
1991	Black Magic Woman	Hank Watfield	
1992	T Bone N Weasel	Rev. Gluck	Television Film
1994	The Shadow	Taxi Driver	
1995	Billy Madison	Carl Alphonse	
1997	Vegas Vacation	Preacher	
1997	Money Talks	Roland	
2000	The Independent	William Henry Ellis	
2003	Nobody Knows Anything!	Blind Man	
2008	Reach for Me	Elliot	
2013	Pain & Gain	Pastor Randy	
2015	The Parting Shot	Aaron	Short Film. Nominated: LAIFF April Award for best Actor in a lead role.
2019	El Camino: A Breaking Bad Movie	Old Joe	
2021	Bengal	Hank	Short Film.
2021	The Eden Theory	Farmer Joe	
2022	I Hear the Trees Whispering	Dale	

=== Television ===
Year	Title	Role	Notes
1966	That Girl	Gus	Episode: "Rich Little Rich Kid"
1969	The Music Scene	Himself/host	7 Episodes
1978	Free Country	Unknown	1 Episode
1978	Laverne & Shirley	Biff	Episode: "The Bully Show"
1980	WKRP in Cincinnati	Mickey Broadhead	Episode: "Hotel Oceanview"
1981	Barney Miller	Earl Kelso	Episode: "The Psychic"
1982	Family Ties	Pickpocket	Episode: "No Nukes is Good Nukes"
1985	It's a Living	Josep	Episode: "Desperate Hours"
1985	Hill Street Blues	Earl Schuester	Episode: "Of Human Garbage"
1986	Matlock	Clayton Hood	Episode: "The Ex"
1986	ALF	Andrew Seminick, Burglar	Episode: "Strangers in the Night"
1986	Joe Bash	Stu	2 Episodes
1990	Singer & Sons	Homeless Man	Episode: "Our's Not to Reason Why Shmy"
1992	Star Trek: The Next Generation	Wind Dancer	Episode: "Cost of Living"
1993	Seinfeld	Tom Pepper	Episode: "The Pilot"
1993	Picket Fences	Bernie Thompson	Episode: "Nuclear Meltdowns"
1994	Married... with Children	Mary	Episode: "Sofa So Good"
1994	The George Carlin Show	Kenny	Episode: "George Goes Too Far"
1994–1996	Friends	Mr. Heckles	5 Episodes
1995	Star Trek: Voyager	Gaunt Gary	3 Episodes
1996	Home Improvement	Larry	Episode: "I Was A Teenage Taylor"
1996	Ellen	Larry	Episode: "Give Me Equity or Give Me Death"
1997	Claude's Crib	Al	Supporting Cast (9 Episodes)
2001	Walker, Texas Ranger	Doc	Episode: "Unsafe Speed"
2003	Malcolm in the Middle	Luther	Episode: "Christmas Trees"
2005	Joan of Arcadia	Homeless Man God	Episode: "Secret Service"
2006	My Name Is Earl	Tom Sparks	Episode: "Van Hickey"
2007-2012	CSI:Crime Scene Investigation	Zapata Childs; Old Stoner Dude	Episode: “Dead Doll”; “Wild Flowers”
2010–2012	Breaking Bad	Old Joe	2 Episodes
2016	Bad Internet	Himself	Episode: "Which of The 'Friends' Are You?" (Web Series)
2018	Barry	Stovka	Episode: "Chapter Three: Make the Unsafe Choice"
2018	Junk Drawer Magical Adventures	Magic Al	Episode: "The Magician Audition"
2019	Baskets	Mortician	Episode: "Common Room Wake"
2021	Friends: The Reunion	Himself/Mr. Heckles	Television Reunion Special
2026	Liam and Michael Presents: Cohan and Danny	Ben’s Grandfather	1 episode
2026	Liam and Michael	Ben’s Grandfather	2 episodes

=== Music videos ===
Year	Artist	Title	Role
1986	Janet Jackson	"What Have You Done for Me Lately"	Cook/Waiter
1992	Reba McEntire	"Take It Back"	Lawyer

== See also ==
- The Lovin' Spoonful's drug bust
