= Too Tough to Care =

1964 anti-smoking film

- Directed by: Dave Parker
- Produced by: Marin County Medical Society
- Distributed by: Sid Davis Productions
- Release date: 1964
- Running time: 18 minutes
- Country: United States
- Language: English

Too Tough to Care is an 18-minute educational film produced in 1964 to undermine teenage resistance to anti-smoking education. Unlike other films in its genre, Too Tough to Care used satire and humor to illustrate the misleading claims of cigarette advertising. The film garnered attention in both the mainstream press as well as academic journals.

== Synopsis ==
Mr. Ramshaw, executive at the fictional Finster Cigarette Company, is dismayed by the medical establishment's successful campaign to link smoking with lung cancer. He pushes his top advertising man, Farley, to find an effective advertising campaign to hook young people on Finster cigarettes. After trying dubious ideas such as providing cigarettes at birthday parties of young children and portraying smoking as fun, Farley realizes that one effective way to counter this anti-smoking campaign would be to promote the concept of being "too tough to care" about the hazards of smoking. So he launches an advertising campaign, complete with a compelling jingle, showing men such as dynamite workers and gas workers lighting up Finster cigarettes in situations that would be dangerous, suggesting that they are too tough to care about consequences.

The campaign is successful. Farley offers Ramshaw a Finster cigarette as they leave the office to celebrate, but the offer is declined. Farley is the only one who smokes. On their way to celebrate, driving down the hairpin turns of Lombard Street in San Francisco, both men turn and stare at an attractive young woman walking by, thereby crashing Farley's Jaguar XKE roadster into something unseen.

== Cast ==
- Scott Beach as Ramshaw
- Larry Hankin as Farley
- Hamilton Camp as Otto
- Dick Stahl as Lumkin
- Gary Goodrow as the Artist
- Bud Haley as the Announcer

== Production ==
Too Tough to Care was produced by the Marin Medical Society, funded partly by a grant from the California Medical Association, and distributed by Sid Davis Productions. The British Film Institute lists the director as Dave Parker, the production company as Lawren Productions, and the sponsor as the American Heart Association.

== Reception ==
The Los Angeles Times called the film "a refreshing departure from conventional educational films." An article in the academic journal American Biology Teacher cited the film with the comment "In contrast to Smoking and You, this film uses the humorous, overly dramatic approach." A paper in the American Journal of Public Health used the film in an experimental program for research on school-based intervention of teenage smoking behavior.

== See also ==
- List of American films of 1964
