= 1999 San Francisco mayoral election =

- November 2, 1999; December 14, 1999
- Turnout: 42.96% ▼2.56 pp (first-round); 48.84% ▲5.88 pp (runoff)
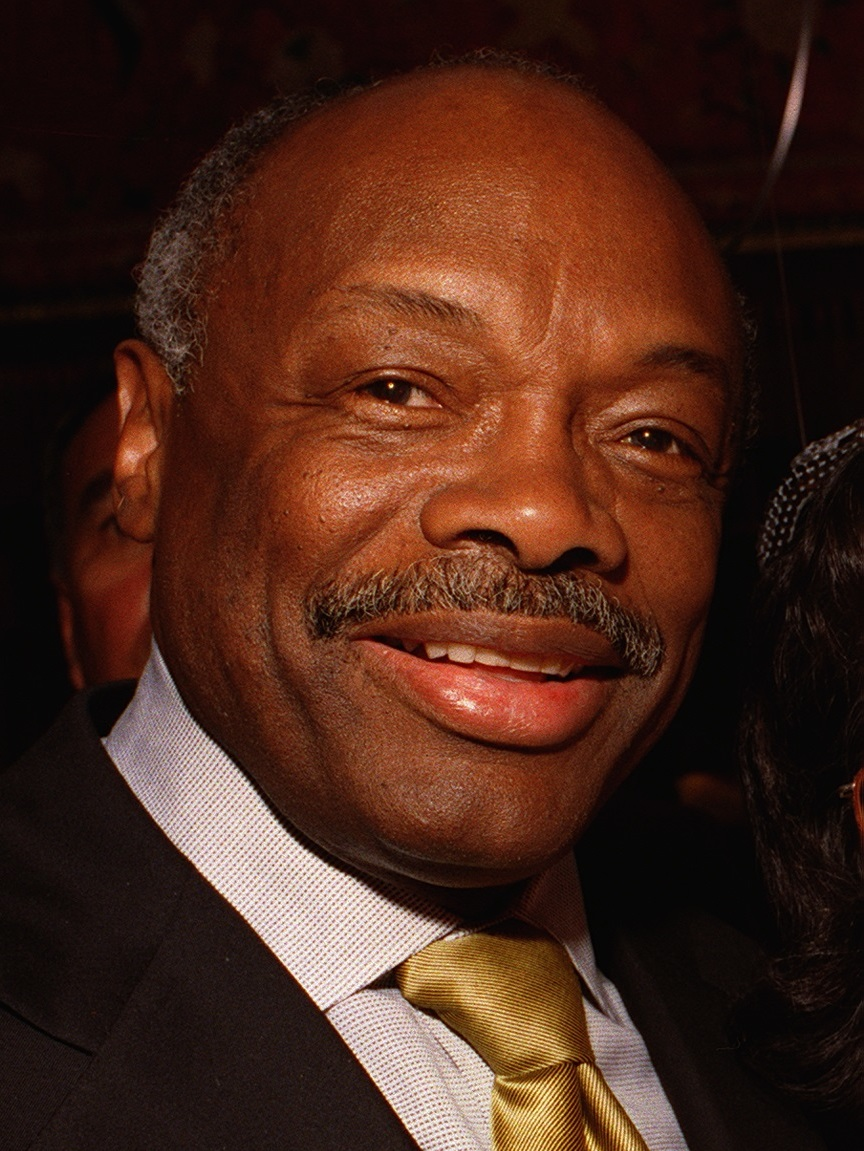

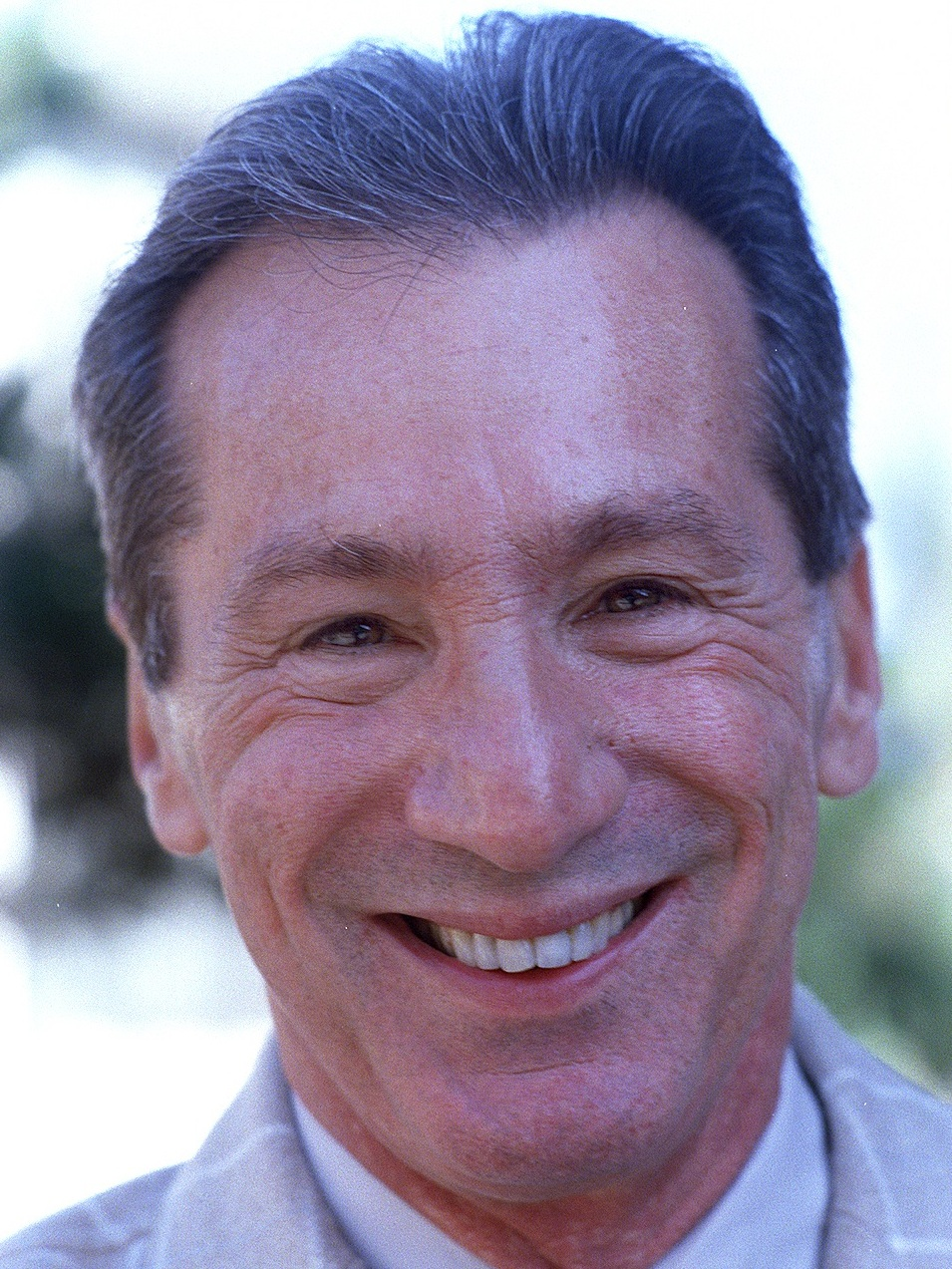

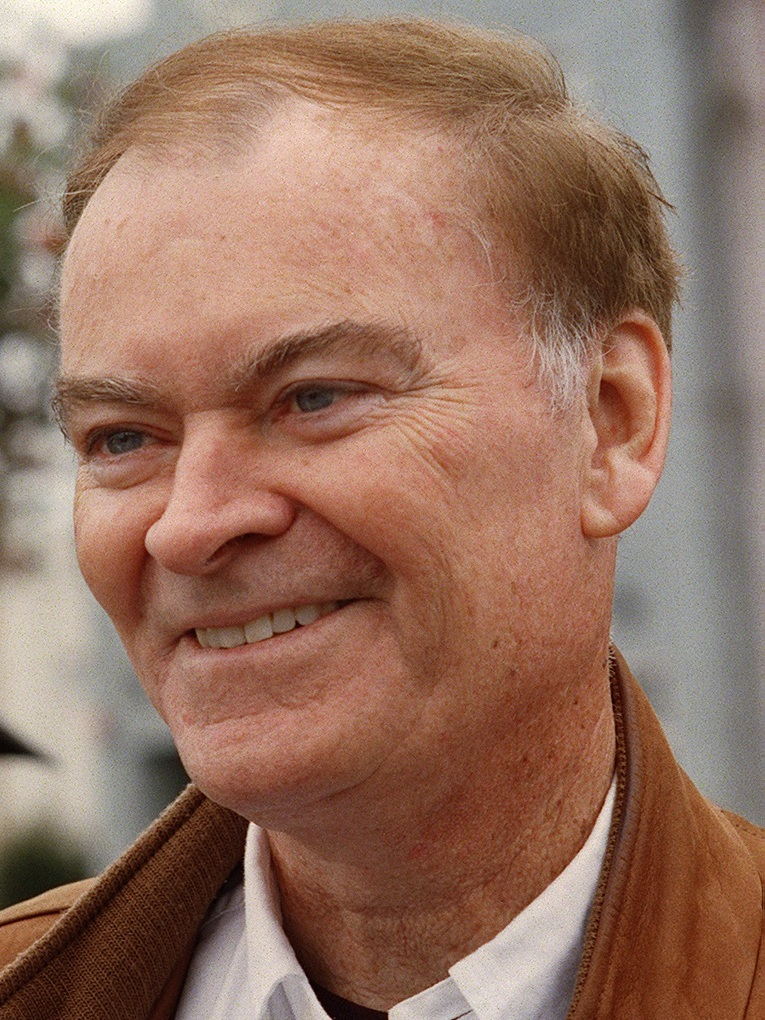

Candidate	Willie Brown	Tom Ammiano
Party	Democratic	Democratic
First round vote	75,732	49,384
First round percentage	38.90%	25.37%
Runoff vote	131,983	89,428
Runoff percentage	59.61%	40.39%
Candidate	Frank Jordan	Clint Reilly
Party	Democratic	Independent
First round vote	32,893	24,322
First round percentage	16.90%	12.49%
- Electoral results by supervisorial district Willie Brown; Tom Ammiano
Mayor before election
Willie Brown
Democratic
Reelected mayor
Willie Brown
Democratic

The 1999 San Francisco mayoral election was held on November 2, 1999, with a runoff election held on December 14, 1999. Incumbent mayor Willie Brown won reelection against supervisor and future Assemblyman Tom Ammiano and nine other candidates for a second term as Mayor of San Francisco.

There is a documentary about the election titled See How They Run.

== Results ==
San Francisco mayoral election, 1999
Candidate	Votes	%
Willie Brown (incumbent)	75,732	38.90
Tom Ammiano (write-in)	49,384	25.37
Frank Jordan	32,893	16.90
Clint Reilly	24,322	12.49
Martin Lee Eng	2,232	1.15
Lucrecia Bermudez	1,709	0.88
Cesar Ascarrunz	1,578	0.81
Jim Reid	1,502	0.77
Joel Ventresca	1,379	0.71
David J. Martz	949	0.49
Mark "Superbooty" O'Hara	919	0.47
A. D. Wyatt Norton	765	0.39
Max Wood	511	0.26
William Felzer	494	0.25
J. R. Manuel	277	0.14
Steve Shyte (write-in)	8	0.00
Larry J. Edmund (write-in)	7	0.00
Anatole Ghio (write-in)	4	0.00
Total votes	194,665	100.00
Turnout	{{{votes}}}	42.96%
Runoff election
Willie Brown (incumbent)	131,983	59.61
Tom Ammiano	89,428	40.39
Invalid or blank votes	6,836	
Total votes	228,247	100.00
Turnout	{{{votes}}}	48.84%
