= The Committee (improv group) =

American improv group (1963–1972)

- Formation: 1963
- Type: Theatre group
- Purpose: Improvisational comedy
- Location(s): San Francisco, California, U.S. Broadway, New York, U.S.

The Committee was a San Francisco-based improvisational comedy group founded by Alan Myerson and Jessica Myerson (born as Irene Ryan and performing as Irene Riordan, later known as Latifah Taormina). The Myersons were alumni of The Second City in Chicago.

== Founding ==
The Committee, named in reference to the House Un-American Activities Committee, opened on April 10, 1963, at 622 Broadway in a 300-seat Cabaret theater that used to be an indoor bocce ball court in San Francisco's North Beach.

Garry Goodrow, Hamilton Camp, Larry Hankin, Kathryn Ish, Scott Beach and Ellsworth Milburn were the original cast. Jessica Myerson (billed as Irene Riordan) joined the company in May. Alan Myerson was the troupe's director, Jerry Mander handled the group's PR, and Richard Stahl (who in very short order joined the improv troupe) was its first company manager.

== 1964 New York ==
Arthur Cantor took the company (now an octet with the addition of Stahl) to Broadway in New York in 1964 for a limited engagement at the Henry Miller Theater. This occasioned a second group to hold the fort in San Francisco: Morgan Upton, Peter Lane, Leigh French, Chris Ross, Howard Hesseman (who was then using the name Don Sturdy), Nancy Fish, Peter Bonerz and Carl Gottlieb became the mainstays of the San Francisco troupe. Roger Bowen, a founding member of both The Compass Players and The Second City, joined in 1966. John Brent, co-creator with Del Close of the How to Speak Hip album and a bit player in many movies (Catch-22, American Graffiti, More American Graffiti, Bob & Carol & Ted & Alice, Steelyard Blues, Porklips Now), was also a member.

== Montgomery Street ==
When the Broadway troupe returned to San Francisco, they became the resident company of Committee Theatre on Montgomery Street. This was a short-lived endeavor that saw three productions mounted there: A Fool's Play, by founding member Larry Hankin; MacBird!, by Barbara Garson; and America Hurrah, by Jean-Claude van Itallie. Joseph Chaikin of La MaMa Experimental Theatre Club and Jean-Claude van Itallie came to San Francisco to direct and oversee that production.

The Montgomery Street theater also quietly hosted a new publication in its basement: Ramparts magazine edited by Robert Scheer (now of Truthdig). By this time, The Committee was a regular at civil rights and anti-war protests—along with Joan Baez, Norman Mailer, and others.

== Broadway, San Francisco ==
Actors were now taking classes and forming other troupes. More and more members came in and out of the improv group or the theater troupe as needed. Mimi Fariña, Dan Barrows, Ed Greenberg, Julie Payne, Ruth Silviera, Jim Cranna, Bruce Mackey and David Ogden Stiers became part of the improvisational troupe. A regular behind-the-scenes stage manager and performer who later successfully formed his own improvisational theater company in Los Angeles (The Groundlings) was Gary Austin.

The Committee performed 13 shows a week and was dark on Mondays when they let other groups use the space. In this way, The Committee hosted an early performance of The Warlocks before they became the Grateful Dead as well as the debut performance of Michael McClure's The Beard.

In June 1968, for Satirithon, a one-time event, at the Committee Theater, at 622 Broadway, in San Francisco, the performers included:

- Luana Anders
- Dan Barrows
- Scott Beach
- Peter Bonerz
- Barbara Bosson
- Roger Bowen
- John Brent
- Hamilton Camp
- Del Close
- Mimi Fariña
- Corey Fischer
- Nancy Fish
- Leigh French
- Gary Goodrow
- Carl Gottlieb
- Larry Hankin
- Howard Hesseman
- Bruce Mackey
- Alan Myerson (Director)
- Jessica Myerson
- Rob Reiner
- Chris Ross
- Ruth Silvera
- David Ogden Stiers
- Mel Stewart
- Morgan Upton

== Los Angeles ==
In the late 1960s, The Committee was asked to form another company to perform in Los Angeles. Peter Bonerz, Mel Stewart, Barbara Bosson, Jessica Myerson, Richard Stahl, Kathryn Ish, Garry Goodrow, Howard Hesseman, Carl Gottlieb, Chris Ross and Rob Reiner were the stalwarts in Los Angeles. The group contributed voiceovers to Garson Kanin's 1969 comedy-drama Where It's At.

== George Lucas ==
In 1971, six members of The Committee, including Scott Beach and Terry McGovern, improvised the off-screen dialogue for George Lucas's THX 1138, out of which emerged the name Wookiee due to McGovern's improvisation "I think I just ran over a Wookie back there." Scott Beach and Terry McGovern improvised off-screen dialogue for George Lucas's Star Wars

== 1972 Disbanded ==
The revolving group of players presented satirical political comedy in San Francisco until 1972.

When The Committee disbanded in 1972, Three major companies were formed: The Pitchel Players, The Wing, and Improvisation Inc, Improv, Inc. being the only company continuing to perform Del's "Original" Harold. In 1976, two former Improv-Inc members, Michael Bossier and John Elk, formed Spaghetti Jam, performing Short-Form improv and Harolds in San Francisco's famous Old Spaghetti Factory. Stand-Up comedians performing down the street at the Intersection for the Arts would drop by and sit in. "Improv Comedy" was born.

== Alumni ==
The alumni who advanced to higher profiles include: improv guru Del Close, who later worked with Saturday Night Live players like Bill Murray; Howard Hesseman, who later played Dr. Johnny Fever on the television sitcom WKRP in Cincinnati; and Peter Bonerz, who later played orthodontist Jerry Robinson on The Bob Newhart Show and who became a television director. Barbara Bosson later married Steven Bochco and was a regular on Hill Street Blues and numerous other television shows. Leigh French became a regular on The Smothers Brothers Comedy Hour and later established her own voice-over looping company. Roger Bowen played Col. Blake in the movie MASH and wrote 11 novels, while David Ogden Stiers portrayed Charles Emerson Winchester III on the television series M*A*S*H, for which he was nominated for two Emmy awards. Carl Gottlieb co-wrote the screenplay for Jaws with Peter Benchley. Alan Myerson was nominated for an Emmy and Directors Guild of America directing awards during a long career in television and movies.

== Record albums ==
Three record albums were released of The Committee recordings. The first was self-released in 1963, and the second was released on Reprise Records (FS-2023) as 'an original cast album' of their Broadway performance in 1964. Both were produced by Alan Myerson.

Nearly a decade later, a third LP of ten improvised routines, entitled The Committee: Wide Wide World Of War, was released in 1973 on Little David Records (LD 1007), a label known for releasing albums by comedians Flip Wilson, the label's founding owner, and George Carlin, who later bought the label. The LP omitted any mention of the writer/performers of the material, though Howard Hesseman is clearly vocally identifiable as one of the cast.

== Films ==
A filmed performance was released theatrically as A Session with the Committee in 1969.

Committee members Alan and Jessica Myerson, Howard Hesseman, Ed Greenberg and Richard Stahl were all cast in Tom Laughlin's counterculture action drama Billy Jack in 1971, which became a surprise hit and boosted their visibility.

The façade of their theater during the run of their show "Sex Is Revolting" appears in the 1974 film Freebie and the Bean.

== Legacy ==
Cheech & Chong's Last Movie reports that Tommy Chong was inspired by improv comedy after seeing The Committee in San Francisco.

"Fellow pros thought even less of [Cheech and Chong], saying that their material was stolen. The word was that much of it came from The Committee, an improvisation company based out of San Francisco. Chong was matter-of-fact about the allegations. 'We do their bits,' he said. 'We do a lot of their bits.' But he qualified it with the assertion and it changed and chonged in their hands." - Berger, Phil (1975). The Last Laugh: The World of the Stand-up Comics. William Morrow and Company. ISBN 978-0-688-02888-6.
