= Merchants Exchange Building (San Francisco) =

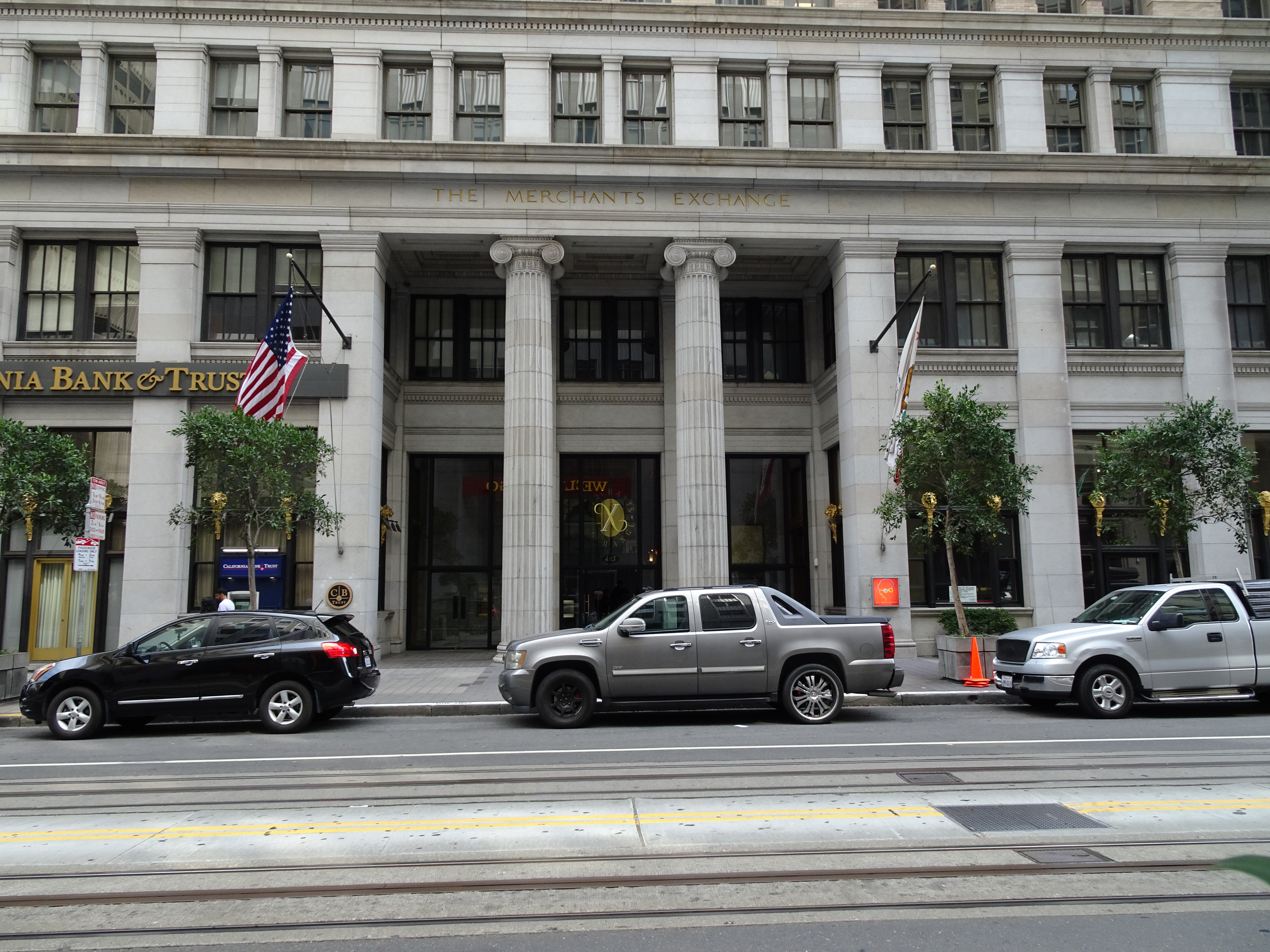

- Location within San Francisco Location within California Location within the United States
- Alternative names: The Merchants Exchange

General information
- Type: Commercial offices
- Architectural style: Beaux-Arts
- Location: 465 California Street; San Francisco, California
- Coordinates: 37.792721°N 122.40215°W
- Completed: 1904

Height
- Architectural: 225 ft (69 m)
- Roof: 195 ft (59 m)

Technical details
- Floor count: 15

Design and construction
- Architects: Daniel Burnham; Willis Polk

The Merchants Exchange Building is an office building located at 465 California Street, San Francisco, completed in 1904. The property is owned by real estate investor Clint Reilly.

== History ==
The Merchants Exchange actually refers to three distinct buildings in the city's history, the first on Battery Street, and the latter two at the present site on California Street, between Montgomery Street and Leidesdorff Alley.

=== Predecessors ===
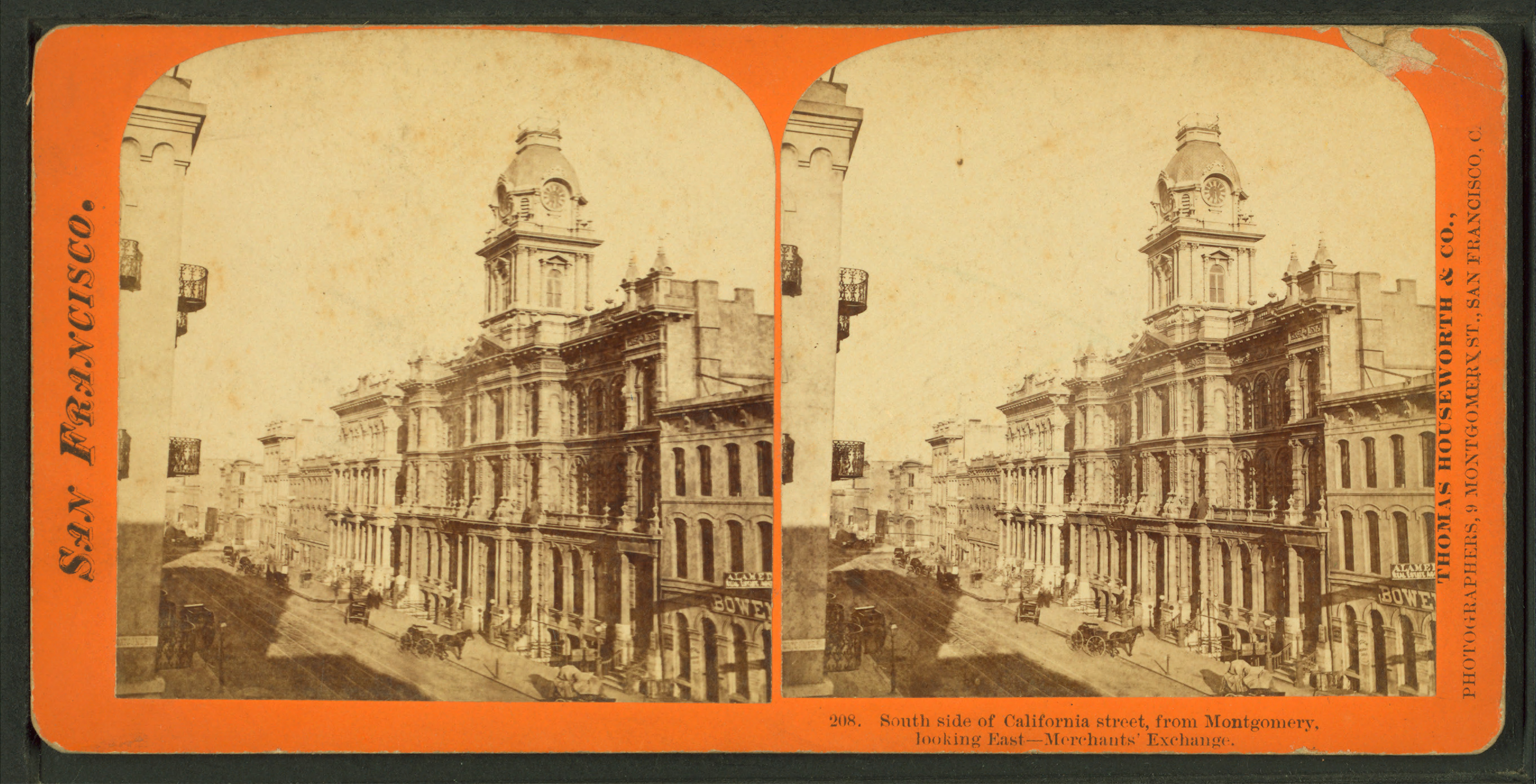
Second structure on California St.

The original Battery Street building, two blocks from the current site, was a three-story brick structure built in 1855 to house the Merchants Exchange, an association of city traders and businessmen. It had a library and a meeting room with bulletins on arriving ships and cargoes. Watchmen on the roof would relay messages of arriving ships to the merchants in the meeting room below, so they could then rush to the docks to meet them.

The second structure, on California Street, was also three-story building, but in the Beaux-Arts style. Since it was situated more inland than its predecessor, it had a tower for the purpose of observing ships. This was succeeded by a fifteen-story skyscraper in 1904, which still stands today.

=== Design ===
The skyscraper was designed by architects Daniel Burnham and Willis Polk in Beaux-Arts, and features a modern steel-frame skeleton and a facade of Tennessee granite and brick sheathing. It was designed to carry over many of the functions of its predecessors, while also serving in the capacity of a modern office building. It had a large meeting room (serving today as a bank) and an observation tower (not in existence today). It was one of the tallest buildings in the city at the time of the 1906 San Francisco earthquake.

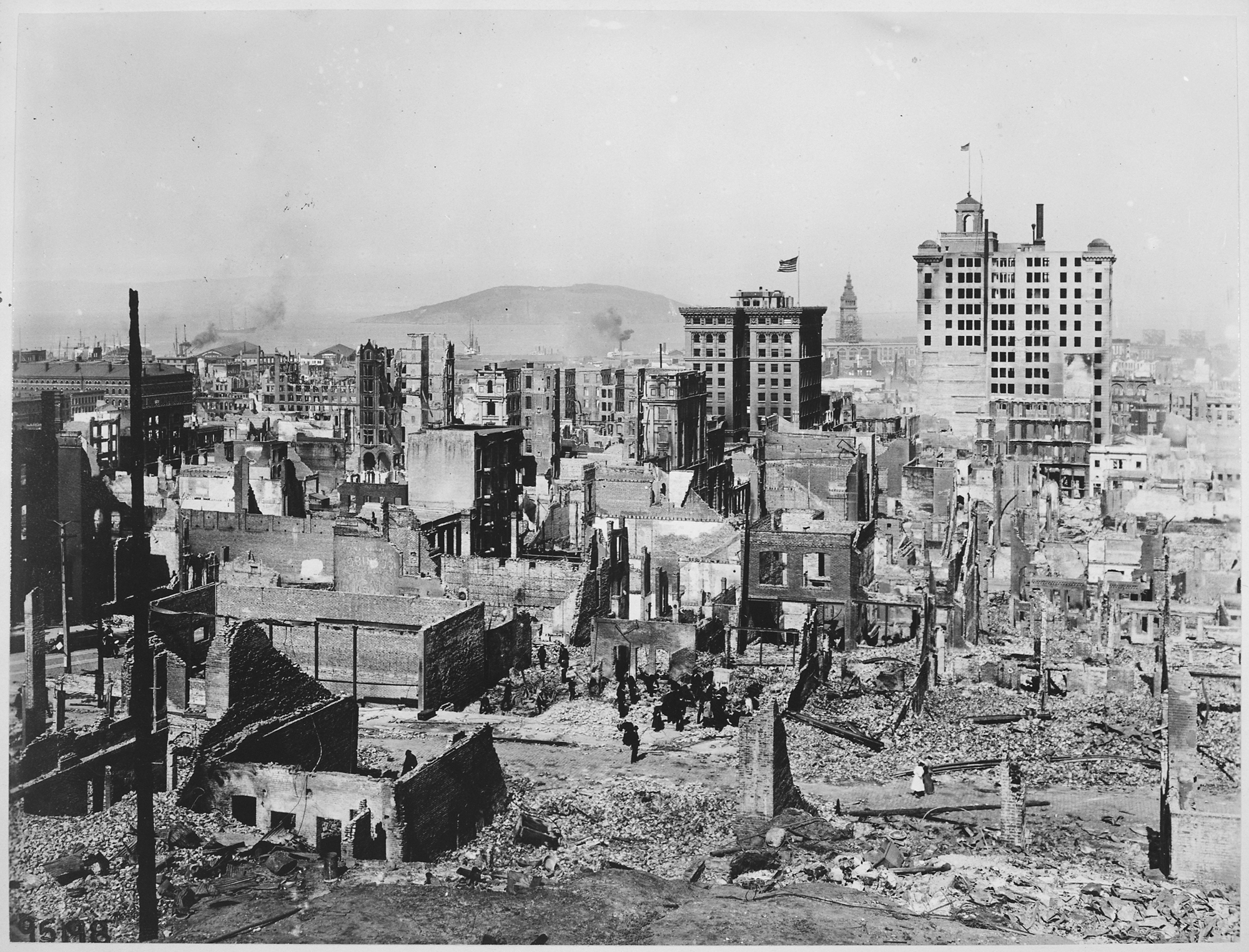
The Merchants Exchange Building (center, large flag) after the 1906 earthquake

Although it was one of the few buildings to survive the quake and subsequent fires, it was heavily damaged. The City believed a quick repair would help create a sense of hope and security for many San Franciscans, and this was accomplished by Polk, with the help of nascent architect Julia Morgan.

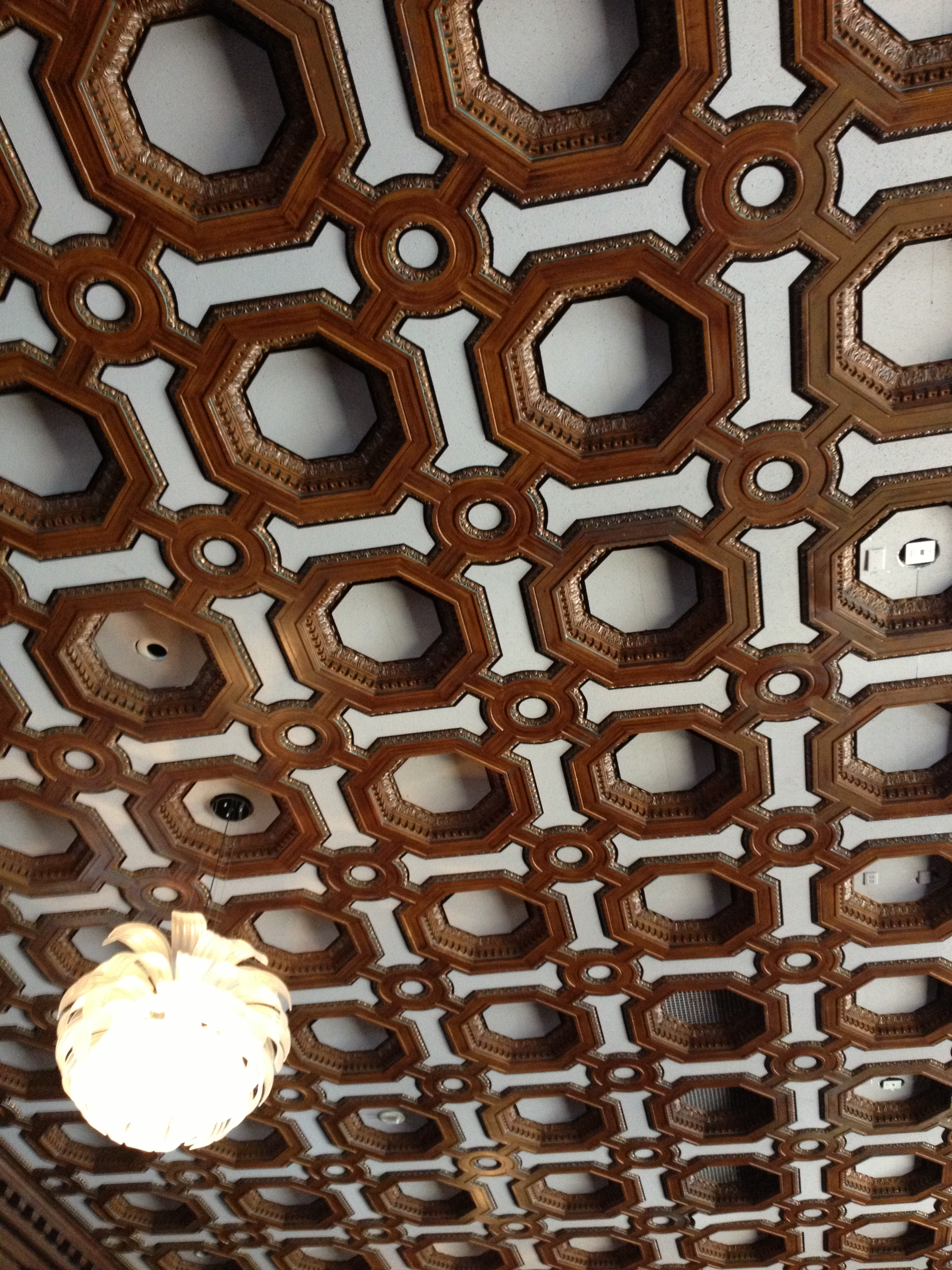
Ceiling at Julia Morgan ballroom

Morgan designed the new skylit, marble lobby, which led to the great hall. Morgan designed the hall's marble Ionic columns, coffered ceiling, and vaulted skylights. She also commissioned noted maritime artist William Coulter to paint the hall's five murals. Each of the 16-by-18 murals depicts a sailing scene. Originally the main meeting room, the hall is now occupied by California Bank & Trust. Morgan's designs also extend into the Beaux-Arts lamps and bronze eagles on the exterior. In 1907, Morgan moved her office to the thirteenth floor of the building, after her previous one was demolished by the earthquake. She kept it here for the rest of her career.

The Merchants Exchange's fifteenth floor was home to the Commercial Club, a chamber for the city's politicians and socialites to powwow and address issues. After the 1906 earthquake, Mayor James Rolph carried out meetings here to plan for the 1915 Pan-Pacific Exposition, as well as fundraisers to finance it. In 1995, real estate investor Clint Reilly acquired the building and following renovations, the Club was renamed the Julia Morgan Ballroom.

== See also ==
- Former California State Capitol sites
