= Elaine Mikels =

American activist

- Elaine Mikels, from a 1963 newspaper
- Born: April 28, 1921; Los Angeles, California
- Died: February 16, 2004 (aged 82); Santa Fe, New Mexico
- Occupations: Activist, social worker
- Known for: Founder, Conard House

Elaine Mikels (April 28, 1921 – February 16, 2004) was an American activist and social worker. In 1960 she opened Conard House, the first psychiatric halfway house in San Francisco. She wrote an autobiography, Just Lucky I Guess: From Closet Lesbian to Radical Dyke (1993). Her papers are held in the June L. Mazer Lesbian Archives.

== Early life ==
Mikels was born in Los Angeles, California, one of the four daughters of Frank M. Mikels and Delia Marx Mikels. She attended Flintridge Sacred Heart Academy, a Catholic boarding school, and San Fernando High School. She trained as a social worker at the University of Southern California.

== Career ==
After World War II, Mikels studied with and worked for Unitarian minister and social worker Conard Rheiner. She did relief work with the American Friends Service Committee in Germany and Finland, but was sent back to the United States because she had a record of hospitalizations for depression and homosexuality. In 1956, she was program director at a California camp for blind adults.

Mikels opened Conard House in San Francisco in 1960, the city's first psychiatric halfway house, primarily serving young former patients of Napa State Hospital. She organized a gathering of halfway house professionals, and gave interviews on her work: "No one at Conard House is treated as a patient," she told The San Francisco Examiner in 1964, noting that the residents kept pets, prepared their own meals, gardened, drank alcohol if they pleased, and had other ordinary freedoms and responsibilities of young adults. In 1966, she left her administrative duties at Conard House for full-time activism.

Mikels was an activist against the Vietnam War and nuclear armament, and for women's health and for gay rights. She opened Oquitadas Feminist Farm in New Mexico in 1972, as a lesbian retreat. She lived in a feminist community in Wolf Creek, Oregon, and co-founded the Older Women's Network there. She represented Oregon as a delegate to the Rural American Women conference in Washington, D.C. In the 1980s, she lived in Durham, North Carolina, and in Santa Fe in her later years.

Mikels wrote and spoke about lesbian communities and intergenerational differences, as well as the needs of older women without traditional family supports. She wrote an autobiography, Just Lucky I Guess: From Closet Lesbian to Radical Dyke (1993). "This book—and its author—simply refuse to be put down," said the book's reviewer in Off our backs, adding "It breathes life and accessibility into periods of lesbian herstory that most younger lesbians have only vague, watered-down ideas of."

== Personal life ==
Mikels had a heart attack and heart surgery in the 1990s. She died in 2004, aged 82 years, in Santa Fe. Her papers, including many photographs documenting American lesbian communities in the 1970s and 1980s, are part of the June L. Mazer Lesbian Archives in Los Angeles. The San Francisco Board of Supervisors declared November 5, 2009 as "Elaine Mikels Day", marking the 50th anniversary of the founding of Conard House.
