= Conard House =

US nonprofit organization

- Founded: 1960
- Founder: Elaine Mikels
- Purpose: Self-Management of Chronic Mental Health and Medical Conditions
- Location: San Francisco
- Region served: San Francisco
- Method: Supportive Housing, Supported Employment, Money Management and Harm reduction
- Members: 1,550
- Executive director: Richard Heasley
- Employees: 170
- Website: http://conard.org

Conard House is a 501(c)(3) nonprofit organization based in the SoMa arts district of San Francisco, working to support adults living with serious mental health and medical conditions. The organization's restated mission is "to empower people who live and work on the margins of society."

Resources in support of this mission include supportive housing, case management, psychiatric rehabilitation, harm reduction, supported employment, money management and computer technology training. Together, these resources are generally referred to as community supported self-management.

== History ==
Conard House was founded in 1960 by Elaine Mikels (1921–2004), who, with her mentor, Conard Rheiner, believed that people learning to live with, or recovering from, mental illness needed not only housing appropriate for their needs but additional outpatient therapeutic, social rehabilitation support and long-term stability in order to reintegrate into the local community.

With the opening of Jackson Street in 1960, Conard House assumed a leading role in the deinstitutionalization movement in the United States with one of the first halfway houses in California, and nationally, for patients discharged from state mental institutions, in this case Napa State Hospital. These halfway houses became the early model for newer federal supportive housing designs, such as Housing First, to address chronic homelessness.

== Supportive Housing ==
Conard House owns, leases and manages 35 residential properties that provide various in-home supportive services, resource linkages and services coordination. Residents, many previously chronic homeless and experiencing serious mental illness, acquire tenancy and can voluntarily access the many resources offered. Conard House owns 9 residential hotels, master-leases 3 other single room occupancy (SRO) hotels and numerous scattered-site residential cooperatives. These include SROs contracted under San Francisco Proposition N (2002) Care Not Cash welfare reform program for homeless single adults, many with dual diagnosis. In all, this housing provides 725 permanent supportive housing units throughout San Francisco. Taken together, these supportive housing programs incorporate a Housing First approach to homelessness.

== Case Management ==
Many people with serious mental health and medical acuities, especially those with dual diagnosis, often have difficulty taking care of their basic needs, experiencing impairments to one or more daily life functions. Case managers provide client-centered services, helping with budgeting, facilitating support groups and assisting residents and clients with access to critical resources. Residents in the cooperatives live independently, and are provided with social rehabilitation, mental health counseling and support through the clinical headquarters, located in the historic Jackson Street building in Pacific Heights.

== Supportive Employment ==
Conard House provides vocational assessment, counseling, job training, placement and employment retention services for residents moving through different stages of recovery. Supportive housing residents are employed in a variety of property management, clerical, janitorial and courier positions. Another component of supportive employment is placement of residents in pre-vocational volunteer positions with other service providers linked into local systems of care. As well, residents are transitioned into permanent part- and full-time employment with mainstream employers. Supportive employment is important for the Jackson Street Co-Operative program because of its requirement that clients secure employment within three months of entering the program.

== Community Service Centers ==
Conard House operates four community service centers offering critical services for resident and non-resident community members throughout San Francisco. The centers have provided money management and social support services to thousands of San Francisco residents through the years, supplementing the agency's primary supportive housing programs for single adults who have experienced chronic homelessness and mental health barriers.

Financial management of federal, state and county disability benefits is an evidence-based practice which acts as an eviction prevention strategy to reduce recidivism, keeping at-risk and vulnerable residents housed.

== Broadband Technology ==
In 2010, Conard House, as a sub-recipient under San Francisco Department of Aging and Adult Services, received federal reinvestment act money under the Broadband Technology Opportunity Program (BTOP). Following the goals of BTOP, Conard House has used this money to create computer training centers, infrastructure and increase sustainable broadband access among Conard House residents. The computer centers are free for all residents and clients of Conard House and offer classes and general computer support. The intended goal of this program is bridging the digital divide by increasing self-sufficiency through computer literacy in a society that is becoming rapidly dependent on broadband technologies.
