= SF Weekly =

American free alternative weekly newspaper

- Type: Alternative weekly
- Format: Tabloid
- Owner: Clint Reilly Communications
- Founded: mid-1970s
- Ceased publication: September 30, 2021 (print only)
- Language: English
- OCLC number: 724024787
- Website: sfweekly.com

SF Weekly is an online music publication and formerly alternative weekly newspaper founded in the 1970s in San Francisco, California. It was distributed every Thursday, and was published by the San Francisco Print Media Company. The paper has won national journalism awards, and sponsored the SF Weekly Music Awards.

== History ==
SF Weekly was founded locally in the late 1970s by Christopher Hildreth and Edward Bachman and originally named San Francisco Music Calendar, the Magazine or Poster Art. Hildreth saw a need for local artists to have a place to advertise performances and articles. The key feature was the centerfold calendar listings for local art events. The paper was bought by Village Voice Media (then New Times Media) in 1995.

In September 2012, Village Voice Media executives Scott Tobias, Christine Brennan and Jeff Mars bought Village Voice Media's papers and associated web properties from its founders and formed Voice Media Group. Four months later, SF Weekly was sold to the San Francisco Media Company, owners of The San Francisco Examiner and the Weekly's long-time rival San Francisco Bay Guardian. The publishers then had control of three of the four major English-language newspapers in San Francisco.

In 2014, San Francisco Media Co. became fully owned by Black Press. The Bay Guardian was closed in 2014, leaving the Weekly as the only print alternative weekly in San Francisco.

In December 2020, Clint Reilly Communications bought SF Weekly together with the Examiner. In September 2021 SF Weekly announced that at the end of that month it would cease publication "for the foreseeable future". It had been adversely affected by the loss of classified ads after the rise of Craigslist.

== Sections ==
- SF Weekly also publishes SF Evergreen, a cannabis publication, both online and in print.
- News: includes local, regional and sometimes statewide short and longform, in-depth news stories.
- Arts and Entertainment: includes a weekly calendar, city events listings, a music section with a weekly music column, several music features, show reviews. The section also includes a food column, film reviews, theater reviews, as well as Dan Savage's syndicated sex advice column Savage Love and Rob Brezsny's Free Will Astrology.

== SF Weekly Music Awards ==
The annual SF Weekly Music Awards were based on a popular vote for nominees and were announced in October at the Warfield Theatre.

== Controversies ==
=== Ethics ===
SF Weekly was the subject of ethical controversy in January 2006, when a column about the AVN Awards misidentified the event's location and honorees. The paper's editor had apparently altered a column about a different event from years before.

In July 2015, after Matt Saincome wrote Counting Cards at Graton Casino, the casino notified SF Weekly of its intention to pull tens of thousands of dollars in ad buys; the publisher of SF Weekly, Glenn Zuehls, reportedly demanded that SF Weekly staff remedy the advertiser with a favorable cover story, by directly assigning the story to a reporter.

=== Bay Guardian Company, Inc. v SF Weekly, et al. ===
The San Francisco Bay Guardian, another free alternative weekly newspaper in the San Francisco Bay Area, sued SF Weekly in civil court, alleging that it tried to put the Bay Guardian out of business by selling ads below cost. The Guardian won the suit in March, 2008, and was granted $6.2 million in damages, a figure that swelled to $21 million with antitrust penalties and interest by June 2010. After the verdict, the Guardian obtained court orders allowing it to seize and sell the Weekly's two delivery trucks and collect half of the Weekly's ad revenue.

== Awards ==
Long Island University George Polk Awards

- 2002: Environmental Reporting: Lisa Davis for "Fallout", coverage of mishandling of nuclear waste at Hunters Point Naval Shipyard

National Society of Newspaper Columnists

- 2009: Humor: 1st Place: Katy St. Clair, Bouncer
