= San Francisco Examiner =

Newspaper in San Francisco, California

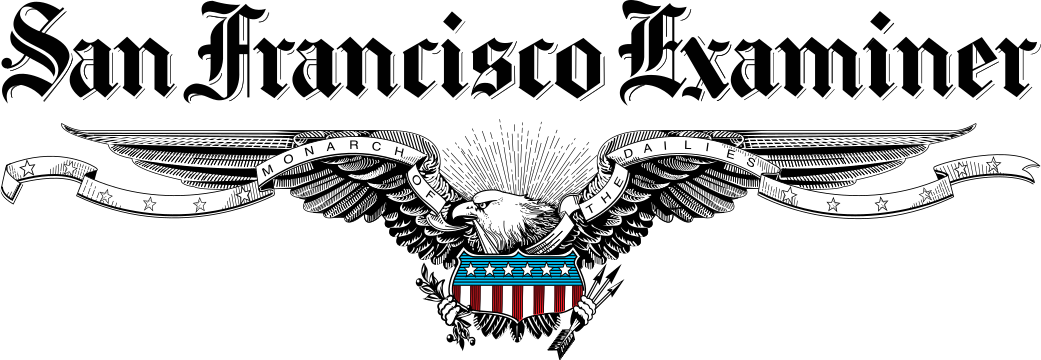

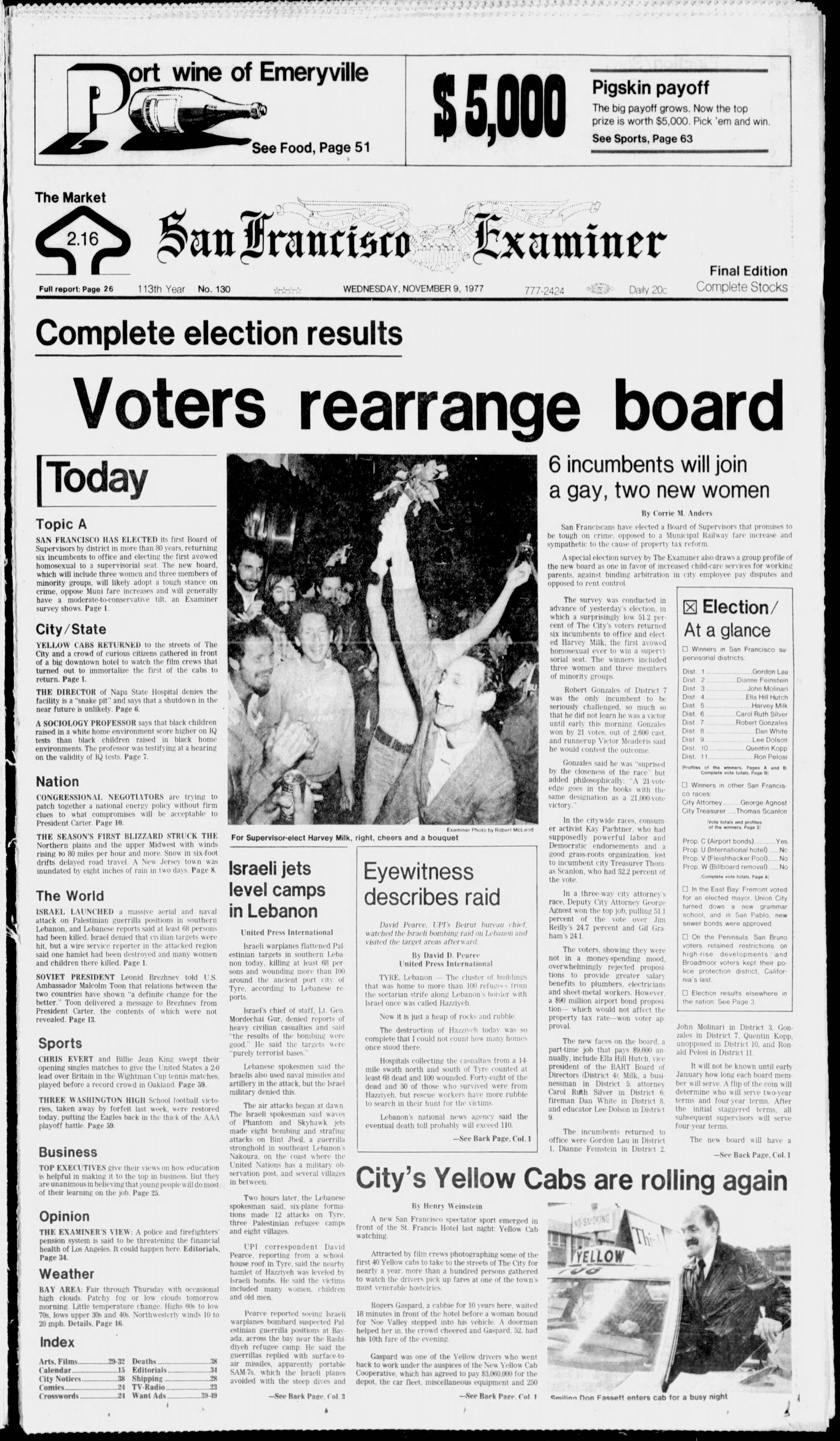
- Front page for November 9, 1977, covering the 1977 San Francisco Board of Supervisors election
- Type: Newspaper
- Format: Broadsheet
- Owner: Clint Reilly Communications
- Founded: 1863 as Democratic Press; 1865 as The Daily Examiner
- Headquarters: 465 California St. Suite 1600; San Francisco, CA 94104
- ISSN: 2574-593X (print); 2993-8155 (web)
- OCLC number: 1764973
- Website: sfexaminer.com

The San Francisco Examiner is a newspaper distributed in and around San Francisco, California, which has been published since 1863. Once self-dubbed the "Monarch of the Dailies" by then-owner William Randolph Hearst and the flagship of the Hearst chain, the Examiner converted to free distribution early in the 21st century and is owned by Clint Reilly Communications, which bought the newspaper at the end of 2020 along with the SF Weekly.

== History ==
=== Founding ===
First edition, June 12, 1865

The Examiner was founded in 1863 as the Democratic Press, a pro-Confederacy, pro-slavery, pro-Democratic Party paper opposed to Abraham Lincoln, but after his assassination in 1865, the paper's offices were destroyed by a mob, and starting on June 12, 1865, it was called The Daily Examiner.

==== Hearst acquisition ====
Announcement of William Randolph Hearst's acquisition of the newspaper, March 4, 1887

In 1880, mining engineer and entrepreneur George Hearst bought the Examiner. Seven years later, after being elected to the U.S. Senate, he gave it to his son, William Randolph Hearst, who was then 23 years old. The elder Hearst "was said to have received the failing paper as partial payment of a poker debt."

William Randolph Hearst hired S.S. (Sam) Chamberlain, who had started the first American newspaper in Paris, as managing editor and Arthur McEwen as editor, and changed the Examiner from an evening to a morning paper. Under him, the paper's popularity increased greatly, with the help of such writers as Ambrose Bierce, Mark Twain, and the San Francisco–born Jack London. It also found success through its version of yellow journalism, with ample use of foreign correspondents and splashy coverage of scandals such as two entire pages of cables from Vienna about the Mayerling Incident; satire; and patriotic enthusiasm for the Spanish–American War and the 1898 annexation of the Philippines. William Randolph Hearst created the masthead with the "Hearst Eagle" and the slogan Monarch of the Dailies by 1889, at the latest.

=== 20th century ===
After the great earthquake and fire of 1906 destroyed much of San Francisco, the Examiner and its rivals—the San Francisco Chronicle and the San Francisco Call—brought out a joint edition. The Examiner offices were destroyed on April 18, 1906, but when the city was rebuilt, a new structure, the Hearst Building, arose in its place at Third and Market streets. It opened in 1909, and in 1937, the facade, entranceway, and lobby underwent extensive remodeling designed by architect Julia Morgan.

Through the middle third of the twentieth century, the Examiner was one of several dailies competing for the city's and the Bay Area's readership; the San Francisco News, the San Francisco Call-Bulletin, and the Chronicle all claimed significant circulation, but ultimately attrition left the Examiner one chief rival—the Chronicle. Strident competition prevailed between the two papers in the 1950s and 1960s; the Examiner boasted, among other writers, such columnists as veteran sportswriter Prescott Sullivan, the popular Herb Caen, who took an eight-year hiatus from the Chronicle (1950–1958), and Kenneth Rexroth, one of the best-known men of California letters and a leading San Francisco Renaissance poet, who contributed weekly impressions of the city from 1960 to 1967. Ultimately, circulation battles ended in a merging of resources between the two papers.

For 35 years, starting in 1965, the San Francisco Chronicle and Examiner operated under a joint operating agreement whereby the Chronicle published a morning paper and the Examiner published in the afternoon. The Examiner published the Sunday paper's news sections and glossy magazine, and the Chronicle contributed the features. Circulation was approximately 100,000 on weekdays and 500,000 on Sundays. By 1995, discussion was already brewing in print media about the possible shuttering of the Examiner due to low circulation and an extremely disadvantageous revenue sharing agreement for the Chronicle.

On October 31, 1969, sixty members of the Gay Liberation Front, the Committee for Homosexual Freedom (CHF), and the Gay Guerilla Theatre group staged a protest outside the offices of the Examiner in response to a series of news articles disparaging people in San Francisco's gay bars and clubs. The peaceful protest against the Examiner turned tumultuous and was later called "Friday of the Purple Hand" and "Bloody Friday of the Purple Hand." Examiner employees "dumped a barrel of printers' ink on the crowd from the roof of the newspaper building." The protestors "used the ink to scrawl slogans on the building walls" and slap purple hand prints "throughout downtown [San Francisco]," resulting in "one of the most visible demonstrations of gay power," according to the Bay Area Reporter. According to Larry LittleJohn, then president of Society for Individual Rights, "At that point, the tactical squad arrived – not to get the employees who dumped the ink, but to arrest the demonstrators. Somebody could have been hurt if that ink had gotten into their eyes, but the police were knocking people to the ground." The accounts of police brutality included instances of women being thrown to the ground and protesters' teeth being knocked out.

In its stylebook and by tradition, the Examiner refers to San Francisco as "The City" (capitalized), both in headlines and in the text of stories. San Francisco slang has traditionally referred to the newspaper in abbreviated slang form as "the Ex" (and the Chronicle as "the Chron").

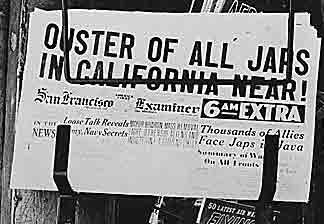
San Francisco Examiner front page, Friday, February 27, 1942

=== 21st century ===
==== Fang acquisition ====
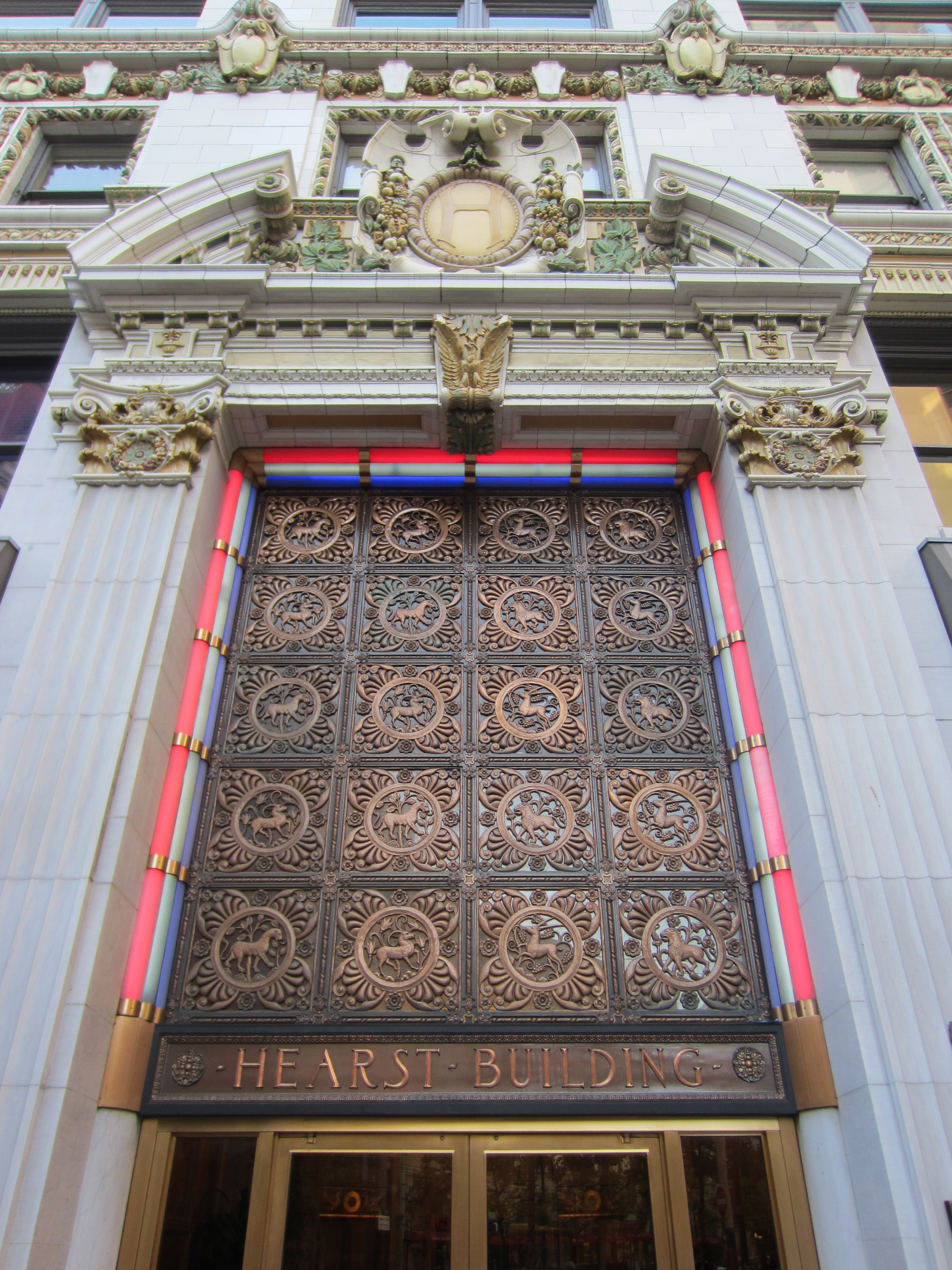
Hearst Building, San Francisco

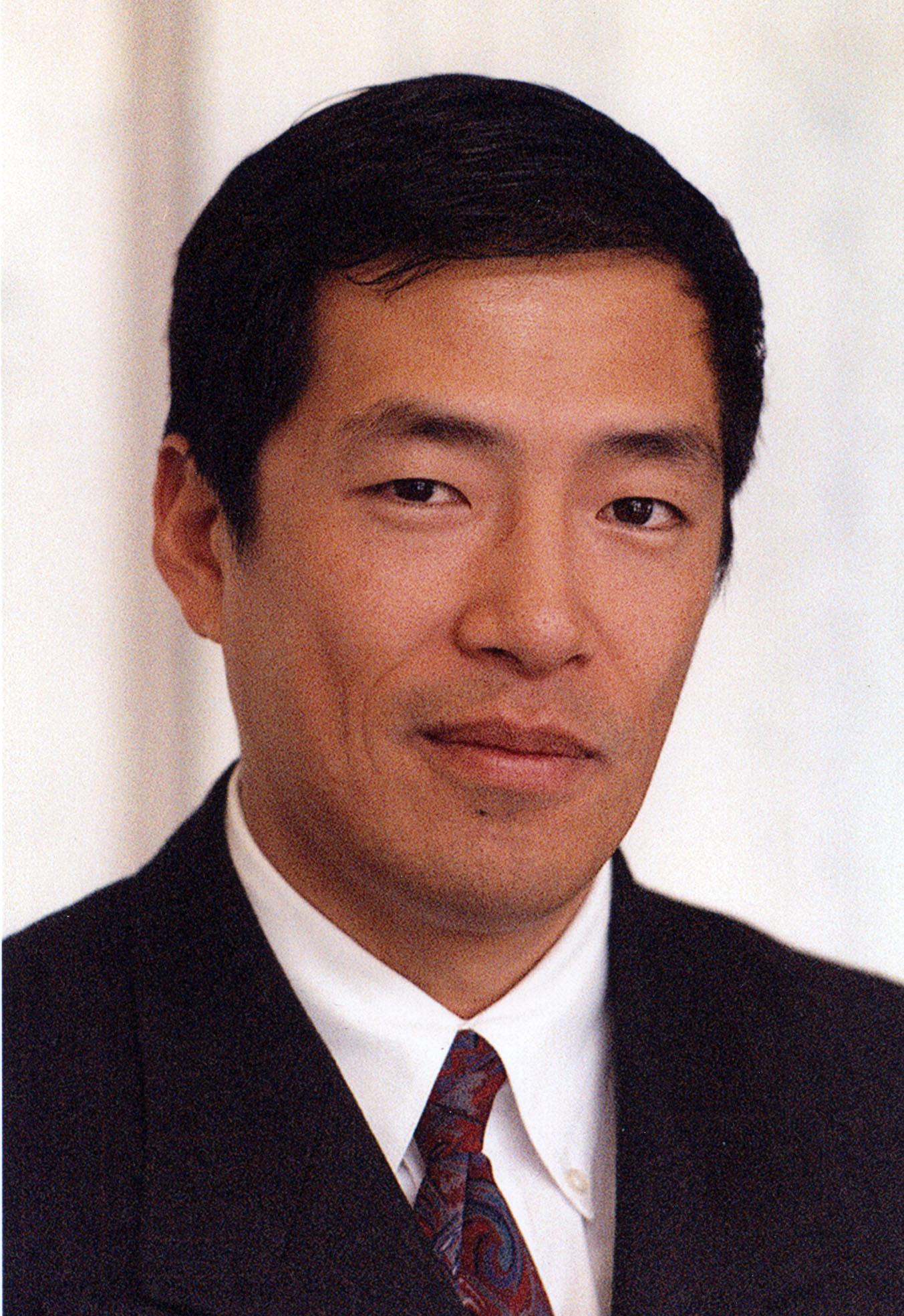
Ted Fang

When the Chronicle Publishing Company divested its interests, Hearst purchased the Chronicle. To satisfy antitrust concerns, Hearst sold the Examiner to ExIn, LLC, a corporation owned by the politically connected Fang family, publishers of the San Francisco Independent and the San Mateo Independent. San Francisco political consultant Clint Reilly filed a lawsuit against Hearst, charging that the deal did not ensure two competitive newspapers and was instead a generous deal designed to curry approval. However, on July 27, 2000, a federal judge approved the Fangs' assumption of the Examiner name, its archives, 35 delivery trucks, and a subsidy of $66 million, to be paid over three years. From their side, the Fangs paid Hearst US$100 for the Examiner. Reilly later acquired the Examiner in 2020.

On February 24, 2003, the Examiner became a free daily newspaper, printed Sunday through Friday.

==== Anschutz acquisition ====
On February 19, 2004, the Fang family sold the Examiner and its printing plant, together with the two Independent newspapers, to Philip Anschutz of Denver, Colorado. His new company, Clarity Media Group, launched The Washington Examiner in 2005 and published The Baltimore Examiner from 2006 to 2009. In 2006, Anschutz donated the archives of the Examiner to the University of California, Berkeley Bancroft Library, the largest gift ever given to the library.

Under Clarity's ownership, the Examiner pioneered a new business model for the newspaper industry. Designed to be read quickly, the Examiner is presented in a compact size without story jumps. It focuses on local news, business, entertainment, and sports, with an emphasis on content relevant to its local readers. It is delivered free to select neighborhoods in San Francisco and San Mateo counties, and to single-copy outlets throughout San Francisco, San Mateo, Santa Clara, and Alameda counties.

By February 2008, the company had transformed the newspaper's examiner.com domain into a national hyperlocal brand, with local websites throughout the United States.

==== Independent ownership ====
Clarity Media sold the Examiner to San Francisco Newspaper Company LLC in 2011. The company's investors included then-President and Publisher Todd Vogt, Chief Financial Officer Pat Brown, and David Holmes Black. Inaccurate early media reports claimed that Black's business, Black Press, had bought the paper. In 2014, Vogt sold his shares to Black Press.

Present-day owners of the Examiner also own SF Weekly, an alternative weekly, and previously owned the now-shuttered San Francisco Bay Guardian.

==== Clint Reilly acquisition ====
In December 2020, Clint Reilly, under his company, Clint Reilly Communications, acquired the SF Examiner for an undisclosed sum. The acquisition included buying the SF Weekly "like a stocking stuffer," Reilly said. He also owns Gentry Magazine and the Nob Hill Gazette.

He then hired editor-in-chief Carly Schwartz in 2021. Under her leadership, a broadsheet-style newspaper was reintroduced, and she launched two newsletters with a nod to the rise in popularity of email marketing models such as Substack. Schwartz also put the SF Weekly on hiatus "for the foreseeable future," ending a tenure of more than 40 years. In 2026, Reilly died at age 79.

== Staff ==
=== Current ===
- Schuyler Hudak Prionas, editor in chief

=== Former ===
- Phil Bronstein, editor (left Examiner in 2012)
- Herb Caen, columnist (1950–1958)
- Oscar Chopin, cartoonist
- C. H. Garrigues, jazz columnist (retired 1967)
- Howard Lachtman, literary critic (1977–1986)
- Edward S. Montgomery, journalist
- Edgar Orloff, assistant managing editor (retired 1982)
- David Talbot, founder of the early online magazine Salon
- Ernest Thayer, humor columnist (1886–1888)
- Stuart Schuffman, also known as Broke-ass Stuart, was a guest columnist. In 2021, he announced that, after 6 1/2 years, he would be moving his column to SF Weekly.
- Al Saracevic was hired as assistant managing editor in 2021. Saracevic died of a sudden heart attack in August 2022 while working on assignment for SF Examiner.
- Frank Herbert
- Allen Matthews was hired as director of editorial operations in 2021 before departing in 2023.

== Editions ==
In the early 20th century, an edition of the Examiner circulated in the East Bay under the Oakland Examiner masthead. Into the late 20th century, the paper circulated well beyond San Francisco. In 1982, for example, the Examiner's zoned weekly supplements within the paper were titled "City", "Peninsula", "Marin/Sonoma" and "East Bay". Additionally, during the late 20th century, an edition of the Examiner was made available in Nevada, which, coming out in the morning rather than in the afternoon as the San Francisco edition did, would feature news content from the San Francisco edition of the day before—for instance, Tuesday's news in the Nevada edition that came out on Wednesday—but with dated, non-hard news content—comic strips, feature columnists—for Wednesday.

== See also ==
- San Francisco Chronicle
- San Francisco newspaper strike of 1994
