= Woodland Hills =

Woodland Hills may refer to:

== Places in the United States ==
- Woodland Hills, Cleveland, a neighborhood in Cleveland, Ohio
- Woodland Hills, Los Angeles, a neighborhood in Los Angeles, California
- Woodland Hills, a neighborhood in Atlanta, Georgia
- Woodland Hills, a neighborhood in North Druid Hills, Georgia
- Woodland Hills, Kentucky, a city in Jefferson County
- Woodland Hills, Utah, a city in Utah County

== Other uses ==
- Woodland Hills School District, a school district in Pittsburgh, Pennsylvania
- Woodland Hills Mall, a large shopping mall in Tulsa, Oklahoma
