= Volunteers in Medicine =

American non-profit

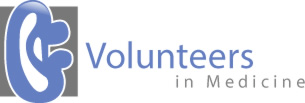
- Formation: 1995/10/31
- Location: Burlington, Vermont
- Website: www.volunteersinmedicine.org

Volunteers in Medicine (VIM) is an American non-profit organization dedicated to building free primary health care clinics for the medically underserved population, including those without health insurance.

== History ==
Volunteers in Medicine (VIM) was founded in 2001 in North Carolina. The organization experienced steady growth until its partnership with The Dr Oz Show, after which rapid growth was reported.

In 2021, VIM announced that its free clinic program would be moved to the National Association of Free and Charitable Clinics (NAFC).

== See also ==
- Volunteers in Medicine: A Culture of Caring by Kristine Wyer
- Authentic Patriotism by Stephen Kiernan
- Circle of Caring: The Story of the Volunteers in Medicine Clinic by Jack B. McConnell, M.D.
