= Steambath (TV series) =

- Genre: Sitcom
- Created by: Bruce Jay Friedman
- Based on: Steambath (play)
- Starring: Jose Perez; Robert Picardo; Al Ruscio; Neil J. Schwartz; Patrick Spohn; Rita Taggart; Janis Ward; Allen Williams
- Theme music composer: David Frishberg
- Composer: Artie Butler
- No. of seasons: 1
- No. of episodes: 6

Production
- Executive producers: Joe Byrne; Jeb Rosebrook; Elias Davis; David Pollock
- Producer: Jerry Madden
- Cinematography: George Spiro Dibie
- Running time: 30
- Production company: Joe Byrne/Falrose Productions

Original release
- Network: Showtime
- Release: August 16 – October 11, 1984

Steambath is an American sitcom on Showtime that presented the afterlife as a steam bath. It was adapted from the Off-Broadway play by Bruce Jay Friedman and featured three cast members and the director from the 1973 PBS TV adaptation.

== Series overview ==
This show presents the afterlife as a steam bath in which recently deceased souls continue to obsess about the same petty concerns that obsessed them in their lives. Ultimately, they are cast into another room offstage which is represented by a dark void by God, the steambath's Puerto Rican attendant. The characters who originated in the play are allowed to stay as various others pass through each week.

== Production ==
Producer Joe Byrne caught the 1973 PBS television production and saw the potential for a weekly series, so he convinced an executive at Warner Bros. to option the rights. All three American TV networks loved it and were keen on keeping Jose Perez as God, but Byrne refused to tone down the material so the project sat in limbo until 1983 when Warner Bros. commissioned author Dan Greenburg to create a script. Greenburg loosely adapted the play and added the character of Blanche to serve as a "romantic interest" for Morty, although their relationship was never explored by David Pollack and Elias Davis, who wrote the rest of the episodes. It was picked up by Showtime, which broadcast the show as a companion to their other new sitcom, Brothers. Basically, it was first television series by Warner Bros. produced for Showtime, the pay cable network previously owned by Warner Communications.

In addition to Perez, Neil J. Schwartz & Patrick Spohn returned from the PBS adaptation as the flamboyant songsters simply known as The Young Men, and Burt Brinckerhoff directed three of the six episodes. Although created as a standard sitcom, the show was shot on a closed set and included a laugh track. As with the play and PBS special, profanity and nudity were included, but this caused concern at Showtime, which insisted on whittling some of it out.

== Cast and characters ==
- Jose Perez as Morty - Also known as God and Morte, Morty is an eccentric Puerto Rican who finds comfort in the menial labor of being a steambath attendant. He frequently takes detours from custodial duties and speaks commands into his computer to both do good for and wreak havoc upon the lives of humans.
- Robert Picardo as Rodney Tandy - A P.R. executive with a 6-year-old daughter who recently got divorced, Tandy was excited about beginning a new chapter of his life, only to discover it was cut short.
- Al Ruscio as Davinci - A crotchety old cab driver with a penchant for speaking in sexual innuendo.
- Janis Ward as Meredith - A free-spirited young woman who lacks sexual hangups but has never had an orgasm, Meredith was electrocuted in her bathtub while attempting to adjust her TV.
- Neil J. Schwartz & Patrick Spohn as The Two Young Men - Reprising their roles from the PBS production, these unnamed flamboyant gay characters make quips in unison and randomly break into a song-and-dance number (which Schwartz also choreographed) in every episode.
- Rita Taggart as Blanche - Morty's assistant is an original character created for this series.
- Allen Williams as Gottlieb - Morty's personal butler who caters to his every frivolous whim.

== Episodes ==
No.	Title	Directed by	Written by	Original release date
1	"In the Beginning"	Burt Brinckerhoff	Dan Greenburg; Bruce Jay Friedman (uncredited - adapted from his play)	August 16, 1984
In this reworked version of the play, Rod Tandy finds himself in a steambath and grapples with the discovery that he's dead. Guest Stars: Libby Boone (Barbara), Charles Lanyer (Walter Ackerman); Song: Just One of Those Things
2	"A Visit from Yuri"	Terry Hughes	Elias Davis	September 13, 1984
A combative radio psychologist tries to analyze Morty. Meanwhile, Meredith has her first orgasm with a Russian cosmonaut. Guest Stars: Richard Brestoff (Yuri), Claudette Nevins (Dr. Blossom Jennings); Song: I Got Rhythm
3	"Tandy's Legacy"	Terry Hughes	David Pollock & Elias Davis	September 20, 1984
Morty agrees to let Tandy attend a gala that he'd been anticipating, but the mood is ruined when former coworker Paul, who had an affair with Tandy's wife, unexpectedly arrives at the steambath. Meanwhile, Davinci rekindles an old romance with a prostitute. Guest Stars: Peter Scolari (Paul), Jeannie Linero (Juanita), David Eric (Scott), Ted Chapman (The Drunk), Tanya Fenmore (Tandy's Daughter), Leslie Morris (The Waiter); Song: You Make Me Feel So Young
4	"The Big Bang"	Burt Brinckerhoff	Elias Davis	September 27, 1984
Meredith throws a surprise party to cheer up Morty, which only upsets him more, so he decides to destroy the Earth. Meanwhile, Blanche schemes to take advantage of the services of a recently deceased plastic surgeon. Guest Stars: Duncan Ross (Professor William Veerdlieb), Richard Venture (Dr. Eglin); Song: Ain't We Got Fun?
5	"Madison Avenue Madness"	Burt Brinckerhoff	David Pollock & Elias Davis	October 4, 1984
Morty collects taxes, feuding comedy partners arrive, and Tandy is smitten with a horny woman until he learns how she died. Guest Stars: Alex Rocco (Tom Devon), Barbara Babcock (Wanda Blakely), Dick Shawn (Frankie Melnick); Song: Lullaby of Broadway
6	"A Preacher and a Jock"	Terry Hughes	David Pollock	October 11, 1984
When beloved baseball player Chuck Skerrit is criticized for throwing his life away with drugs, Morty conjures scenes from Skerrit's past to prove to everyone that his life wasn't easy. Meanwhile, a reverend finds it impossible to believe that Morty is God. Guest Star: Steven Williams (Chuck Skerrit), Michael Prince (Reverend Fallows), John Mahon (The Fan), Rob Monroe (The Bartender), Paul Tuerpe (The Player), Lilly Tartikoff (The Ballerina); Song: I'm Just Wild About Harry
