= Cyndi Lauper: Still So Unusual =

American reality television series

- Genre: Reality
- Starring: Cyndi Lauper; David Thornton; Declyn Thornton
- Country of origin: United States
- Original language: English
- No. of seasons: 1
- No. of episodes: 12

Production
- Executive producers: Annabelle McDonald; Mark Burnett; Cyndi Lauper
- Running time: 20 to 23 minutes
- Production company: One Three Media

Original release
- Network: WE tv
- Release: January 12 – February 16, 2013

Cyndi Lauper: Still So Unusual is an American reality television series aired on WE tv. The series debuted on January 12, 2013, at 9pm ET/PT.

== Premise ==
The series focuses on the daily life of Cyndi Lauper as she manages her career and unusual personal life. Along with Lauper, her husband and son, David and Declyn Thornton are also shown in the series.

== Episodes ==
No.	Title	Original release date
1	"No Voice, No Choice"	January 12, 2013
Cyndi prepares and performs on The Voice. Kathy Griffin stops by and the two have lunch. Cyndi ends her day at home with her family.
2	"Derby Day"	January 12, 2013
Cyndi, David and Declyn attend the Kentucky Derby and Cyndi is assigned to be the grand marshal of the Pegasus Parade. Later, Cyndi slips and uses explicit language on live television.
3	"Cannes She Do It?"	January 19, 2013
Cyndi and David try to enjoy some alone time while in the Cannes for a private concert. Ronnie Wood of the Rolling Stones joins Cyndi on stage at the private concert.
4	"Cyndi's Wild Ride"	January 19, 2013
Cyndi blows off her work schedule and instead goes to Coney Island for a fun filled day with close friends and family. She ends up having issues with her latest remixes for failing to listen to the tracks.
5	"Don't Rain On My PSA"	January 26, 2013
Cyndi prepares for a Public Service Announcement for her True Colors foundation, while David and Declyn play a round of golf.
6	"Dinner For One"	January 26, 2013
Cyndi is stressed with her busy day, along with trying to be home in time for dinner with David.
7	"Cyndi's Smash Hit"	February 2, 2013
Cyndi goes out to lunch with David and the duo play boccie. Cyndi spends some time with her mother. Later, everyone gathers for a game of paintball and Cyndi meets up with her friends Rowdy Roddy Piper and Wendi Richter on WWE.
8	"Ms. Lauper Goes to Washington"	February 2, 2013
Cyndi is awarded for her work with LGBT youth. Later, she gets into the world of lobbying and helps gain support for the Reconnecting Youth to Prevent Homelessness Act. Cyndi also meets with Nancy Pelosi.
9	"These Boots Aren't Made for Dancing"	February 9, 2013
Cyndi is the grand marshal of the gay pride parade and prepares for her performance after but there's a problem with her wardrobe. David and Declyn enjoy a vacation.
10	"Cyndi's Surprise"	February 9, 2013
Lisa, David and Max plan out a surprise birthday party for Cyndi while Cyndi goes to the spa and talks to her mother, who had recently suffered a stroke. Later, Cyndi and her mother go to an Alice in Wonderland themed Red Hat Society meeting. In the end, everyone sits down to enjoy a nice surprise birthday dinner.
11	"From Runway to Broadway"	February 16, 2013
Cyndi is in Chicago to prepare for the debut of her play. While in the city, Cyndi goes to a Betsey Johnson event, where she'll be performing. Later, the preview screening night of Cyndi's play is here and Cyndi is nervous about what the critics have to say.
12	"Cyndi Lauper: A Memoir"	February 16, 2013
Cyndi re-records a song for an upcoming movie, goes to a rock psychic and her sister comes over. Later, Cyndi plus her mom and sister sit down to review her new memoir with the press release the following day at Barnes & Noble.
