= Nathan George =

American actor (1936–2017)

- Nathan George as Attendant Washington in One Flew Over the Cuckoo's Nest (1975)
- Born: July 27, 1936; United States
- Died: March 3, 2017 (aged 80); New York City, New York, United States
- Occupation: Actor
- Years active: 1968-1997

Nathan George (July 27, 1936 – March 3, 2017) was an American actor who was active from 1968 to 1997. He co-won a 1969 Obie Award with Ron O'Neal for Charles Gordone's Pulitzer Prize-winning play No Place to Be Somebody; this performance also received a Drama Desk Award.

George also directed for the stage. He directed a production of Ron Milner's Who's Got His Own at Center Stage in Baltimore in 1970, and Cummings and Bowings, a play based on poems by E.E. Cummings, for the U.R.G.E.N.T. Theatre in New York in 1973.

In film, George acted in The Taking of Pelham One Two Three (1974), Brubaker (1980), Klute (1971), Serpico (1973), Harsh Light (1997), his last film, and One Flew Over the Cuckoo's Nest (1975) and was one of the leads in Short Eyes (1977).

George died on March 3, 2017, in New York City.

== Filmography ==
Year	Title	Role	Notes
1970	Move (1970 film)	Man	Uncredited
1971	Klute	Trask	
1973	Serpico	Smith	
1974	The Taking of Pelham One Two Three	Police Patrolman James	
1975	One Flew Over the Cuckoo's Nest	Attendant Washington	
1977	Short Eyes	Ice	
1980	Brubaker	Leon Edwards – Prison Board	
1996	Night Falls on Manhattan	Juror	Uncredited
1997	Harsh Light	Montgomery Paris	short film

=== Television ===
Year	Title	Role	Notes
1972	Madigan	Roscoe Blue	NBC
1978	To Kill A Cop	Charles	NBC Television Movie
1985	The Equalizer	Tessor	Episode: "Bump and Run"
1989	A Man Called Hawk	Crawldaddy	1 Episode
1996	On Seventh Avenue	Floyd Nevins	NBC Television Movie
