= Klute =

1971 film by Alan J. Pakula

- Theatrical release poster
- Directed by: Alan J. Pakula
- Written by: Andy Lewis; Dave Lewis
- Produced by: Alan J. Pakula
- Starring: Jane Fonda; Donald Sutherland; Charles Cioffi; Nathan George; Dorothy Tristan; Roy Scheider; Rita Gam
- Cinematography: Gordon Willis
- Edited by: Carl Lerner
- Music by: Michael Small
- Production company: Gus Productions
- Distributed by: Warner Bros. Pictures
- Release date: June 23, 1971
- Running time: 114 minutes
- Country: United States
- Language: English
- Budget: $2.5 million
- Box office: $12.5 million

Klute is a 1971 American neo-noir psychological thriller film directed and produced by Alan J. Pakula and starring Jane Fonda, Donald Sutherland, Charles Cioffi, Nathan George, Dorothy Tristan, Roy Scheider and Rita Gam. Its plot follows a high-priced New York City call girl who assists a detective from Pennsylvania in solving the missing person case of a john who may be stalking her. It is the first installment of what has informally come to be known as Pakula's "paranoia trilogy", followed by The Parallax View (1974) and All the President's Men (1976), all films dealing with themes of paranoia, conspiracies and surveillance.

The original screenplay for Klute was written by brothers Andy and Dave Lewis, with Andy drawing inspiration from a serial he read as a child about a man attempting to solve his brother's murder in a city. Principal photography took place in late 1970 and early 1971 in New York City.

Klute was released theatrically in the United States on June 23, 1971, by Warner Bros. Pictures to critical and commercial success. Reviewers praised the film's direction and screenplay, with Fonda's performance receiving widespread critical acclaim, while the film grossed over $12 million against a $2.5 million budget.

Klute received two nominations at the 44th Academy Awards, including Best Original Screenplay, with Fonda winning Best Actress. At the 25th British Academy Film Awards, Fonda received a nomination for Best Actress in a Leading Role. At the 29th Golden Globe Awards, it received a nomination for Best Screenplay, with Fonda winning Best Actress in a Motion Picture – Drama.

== Plot ==
After Pennsylvania chemical company executive Tom Gruneman disappears, the police find an obscene letter in his office addressed to a New York City call girl named Bree Daniels, who had received several such letters. After six months of fruitless police work, Peter Cable, a fellow executive at Gruneman's company, hires family friend and detective John Klute to investigate the disappearance.

Klute rents an apartment in the basement of Bree's building, taps her phone, and follows her as she turns tricks. Bree appears to enjoy the freedom of freelancing as a call girl while auditioning for acting and modeling jobs, but she reveals the emptiness of her life to her psychiatrist. After learning that Klute has been watching her, Bree says that she does not recognize Gruneman. She acknowledges having been beaten up by a john two years earlier but cannot identify Gruneman from a photo. She further admits to Klute that she is a nervous and paranoid person. Bree takes Klute to meet her former pimp Frank Ligourin, who had managed Jane McKenna, a prostitute who had referred the abusive client to Bree. McKenna has apparently committed suicide, and their other colleague Arlyn Page has since become a drug addict and disappeared.

Klute and Bree develop a romance, although she tells her psychiatrist that she wishes their relationship would end because she felt more in control of herself when turning tricks. They find Page, who tells them that the photo of Gruneman is not that of the client, who was an older man. Page's body is later found in the river. Klute connects the apparent suicides of the two prostitutes, surmising that the client was using Gruneman's name. He also thinks the client killed Gruneman and might kill Bree next. Klute revisits Gruneman's acquaintances. By typographic comparison, the obscene letters are traced to Cable, to whom Klute has been reporting during his investigation. Klute asks Cable for money to buy the "black book" of McKenna's clients to learn the identity of the abusive client. He leaves enough bread crumbs to see whether Cable reveals his own complicity in the murders.

Cable follows Bree to a client's office and reveals that he sent her the letters. He tells her that after Gruneman accidentally found him physically abusing McKenna, Cable was worried that Gruneman would use the incident to sabotage Cable's career, so he tried to frame Gruneman by planting the letter in his office. After playing a snuff audiotape he recorded as he murdered Page, he attacks Bree. When he sees Klute rush in, Cable lurches backward, crashing through a window to his death.

Bree vacates her apartment with Klute's help. A voiceover conversation with her psychiatrist reveals her hesitancy to surrender her life of autonomy to enter a traditional relationship with Klute, saying that she would lose her mind if she turned to a domestic lifestyle. She admits that, although she will miss Klute, she is unable to tell him and jokes that the doctor will likely see her again the next week. As they leave the apartment, Bree receives a telephone call from a client and informs him she is leaving New York and does not expect to return. She and Klute leave the apartment together.

== Cast ==
- Jane Fonda as Bree Daniels
- Donald Sutherland as John Klute
- Charles Cioffi as Peter Cable
- Roy Scheider as Frank Ligourin
- Dorothy Tristan as Arlyn Page
- Rita Gam as Trina
- Nathan George as Trask
- Vivian Nathan as the psychiatrist
- Robert Milli as Tom Gruneman
- Morris Strassberg as Mr. Goldfarb
- Jean Stapleton as Goldfarb's secretary
- Sylvester Stallone as Club Patron (uncredited extra)
- Candy Darling as Discothèque Patron (uncredited)

== Themes ==
Writer Karen Gai Dean notes paranoia and surveillance as principal themes in Klute. She writes that the film's recurrent use of audio tapes as both "visual and aural themes ... presciently evoke the paranoia of the Watergate era."

The film is widely regarded as the first entry in Pakula's informal "paranoia trilogy," followed by The Parallax View (1974) and All the President's Men (1976). Scott Tobias of The Guardian noted that while the film "doesn't have the conspiratorial flavor of Pakula's more political films, Klute approaches the genre with the same creepy ambience, with camera angles that suggest surveillance, and an excellent score, by Michael Small, that would seem more suited to horror, with its jangling of keys on the far end of a piano. There's an aura of danger and instability that keeps the film on edge."

== Production ==
=== Development ===
Andy Lewis, a writer who had primarily worked in television, developed the screenplay for Klute with the goal of wanting to transition into feature films. His initial inspiration for the screenplay originated from a serial story he had read as a child in The Saturday Evening Post about a man from the country who ventures into the city in an attempt to solve the murder of his brother who was killed there in an empty lot. Lewis focused on two themes he felt were resonant to Americans, firstly "the rube who turns the tables on the city slickers", and secondly, paranoia: "I'm sure this afflicts people all over the world, but I somehow think of it as typically American. The hidden pattern of things. The darkness. The people out there watching you, plotting against you, waiting to hurt you. Sounds you hear at night. Silences on the phone. All that stuff. I figured I would write this thing, however it went, to take the fullest possible advantage of this—what should we call it?—instinct. Deliberately."

The spec script was completed by Andy Lewis in collaboration with his older brother, Dave. The brothers corresponded by letters and phone—Andy from his Massachusetts residence, and Dave from his home in California—with Andy undertaking much of the scripting. Andy commented that the writing was highly collaborative, concluding: "I'd have trouble attributing any part of the original script to one or the other of us solely."

=== Casting ===
The casting of Jane Fonda, who had recently completed They Shoot Horses, Don't They? (1969) was announced in April 1970. At the time, Fonda had attracted significant scrutiny for her activism against the Vietnam War, and much of the publicity surrounding the film made note of this. To prepare for the role, Fonda spent a week in New York City observing high-class call girls and madams. She also accompanied them on their outings to after-hours clubs to solicit men. Fonda noticed that none of the men showed any interest in her, which she believed was because they could see that she was really just an "upper-class, privileged pretender".

Fonda had doubts about whether she could portray the role and asked Alan Pakula to release her from her contract and hire Faye Dunaway instead, but Pakula refused. One of Fonda's primary concerns was that she, as an emerging feminist, should not play a prostitute, but when Fonda admitted this concern to a longstanding feminist, she was told "If the script is good, and it's an opportunity to be three-dimensional, of course you should do it!" To overcome her doubts that she could play such a role, Fonda turned to her memories of several call girls whom she had known while living in France, all of whom worked for the famed Madame Claude. She remembered that all of them had been sexually abused as children, and Fonda used this as an "entry" to her own character and as a way to understand Bree's motivations in becoming a prostitute.

Donald Sutherland was cast as private investigator, John Klute, signing onto the project in May 1970. Sutherland later admitted that he clashed with Pakula during the production, commenting that it "was a film where the director had a specific idea, which I didn't particularly understand, nor was I particularly interested in." Roy Scheider was cast as Bree's pimp, Frank Ligourin, a role that brought him significant attention and notably furthered his career.

=== Filming ===
Principal photography of Klute began in December 1970 in New York City. In March 1971, it was reported that filming had completed.

The film was shot by cinematographer Gordon Willis, a frequent collaborator of Pakula known for his employment of darkness and shadows in his cinematography. Film scholar Terence McSweeney writes in The Other Hollywood Renaissance (2020) that the film's cinematography is deliberately destabilizing and disorienting, utilizing close-up shots while lacking establishing shots, and that its editing style features abrupt transitions and a lack of traditional film cues. Donald Sutherland, reflecting on the film, commented that, "there were a lot of things in Klute that didn't make any sense in terms of movies."

== Music ==
=== Soundtrack ===
The film's soundtrack was composed by Michael Small. Klute was Small's second film score, and first in Hollywood after Out of It (1969). The consulting editor of that film, Carl Lerner, subsequently recommended Small to Pakula. Small was afforded a large amount of freedom in his development of the score, and made use of a chamber orchestra, with a microtonal xylophone, unorthodox percussion, and female vocals. A central motif within the score is the idea of a "siren call", used to identify both Fonda's character and the killer.

Like several of Small's other film scores, Klute's soundtrack was pressed in relatively small numbers, and copies of its original pressing on vinyl have fetched high prices in the second-hand market. In 2007, it was released on CD in a double-bill with the soundtrack for All The President's Men, which was composed by David Shire.

Small and Pakula's working relationship lasted for a number of years, with him also scoring The Parallax View, Love and Pain and the Whole Damn Thing (1973), Comes a Horseman (1978), and See You in the Morning (1989).

== Release ==
=== Theatrical ===
Klute was released theatrically in the United States by Warner Bros., premiering on June 23, 1971, in Los Angeles and New York City before opening wide on June 25.

=== Home media ===
Warner Bros. Home Entertainment released Klute on DVD first in February 2002. The Criterion Collection released the film on Blu-ray in July 2019 featuring a new 4K restoration from the original film elements.

== Reception ==
=== Box office ===
The film earned US$8 million (equivalent to $63,599,014 in 2025) in theatrical rentals at the North American box office.

=== Critical response ===
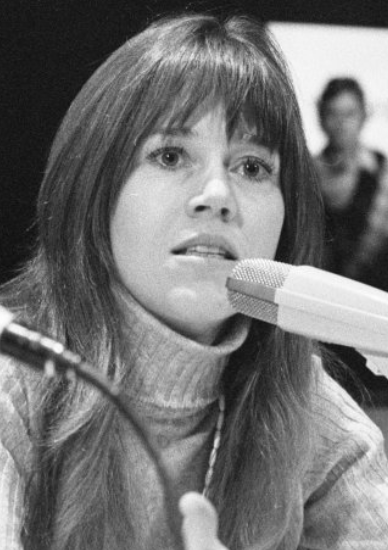
Jane Fonda's performance received widespread critical acclaim, earning her the Academy Award for Best Actress.

Klute was widely praised by critics for its screenplay and Fonda's performance, though some criticized Pakula's unconventional direction. On the review aggregator website Rotten Tomatoes, the film holds an approval rating of 92% based on 48 reviews, with an average rating of 8.2/10. The website's critics consensus reads, "Donald Sutherland is coolly commanding and Jane Fonda a force of nature in Klute, a cuttingly intelligent thriller that generates its most agonizing tension from its stars' repartee." Metacritic, which uses a weighted average, assigned the film a score of 81 out of 100, based on 15 critics, indicating "universal acclaim".

The Los Angeles Times's Charles Champlin praised Fonda and Sutherland's performances, summarizing: "Klute is visually stunning, full of surprises, bewildering and suspenseful, faultless in its timing... Like the best mysteries always, Klute offers more than its diversions and redeems its sordid materials by understanding them and finding them worth pity, not amusement."

Roger Ebert of the Chicago Sun-Times awarded Klute 3.5 stars out of a possible 4, writing that while the thriller elements were poorly executed, the performances of Sutherland and especially Fonda carried the film. He suggested that the film should have been titled Bree after her character, who is the "soul" of the film and avoids the hooker with a heart of gold stereotype:

What is it about Jane Fonda that makes her such a fascinating actress to watch? She has a sort of nervous intensity that keeps her so firmly locked into a film character that the character actually seems distracted by things that come up in the movie.

Gene Siskel of the Chicago Tribune was similarly appreciative, writing: "More interesting than the mystery is the character of Bree... the nicest part of her character (due to the script and Miss Fonda's fine performance) is that this prostitute doesn't have a heart of gold. She's a hungup little broad who, when cornered by violence or tenderness, will scratch and bite. Director Alan Pakula's... crisply edited movie runs too long only in drawing out its conclusion….Sharp eyes will solve the mystery midway thru the film. Miss Fonda's performance is superior to her most recent work in They Shoot Horses, Don't They?... Sutherland... presents a controlled posture as the industrious detective. His low profile nicely balances Miss Fonda's incendiary role."

J. Luria, writing for the Professional Psychology: Research and Practice journal, praised the film for its psychological elements, particularly its nuanced depiction of prostitution, noting that "a good mystery plot and excellent acting make this film entertaining. But the sociopsychological scrutiny of the prostitution subculture makes it outstanding. The film unfolds on several levels, the description of the call girl, the struggle for her growth, the relationship of Klute and Bree, and the mystery theme. Overall, it is an excellent blending of the clinical and the literal."

Roger Greenspun of The New York Times, in one of the few negative reviews, wrote, "Pakula, when he is not indulging in subjective camera, strives to give his film the look of structural geometry, but despite the sharp edges and dramatic spaces and cinema presence out of Citizen Kane it all suggests a tepid, rather tasteless mush. The acting in Klute seems semi-improvisatory, and in this Jane Fonda, who is good at confessing, is generally successful. Everybody else merely talks a lot, except for Sutherland, who scarcely talks at all. A normally inventive actor, he is here given precisely the latitude to evoke a romantic figure with all the mysterious intensity of a youthful Calvin Coolidge."

Writing for the Chicago Reader in 1985, critic Dave Kehr declared the film "as close to a classic as anything New Hollywood produced."

=== Accolades ===
| Award | Category | Nominee(s) | Result | Ref. |
|---|---|---|---|---|
| Academy Awards | Best Actress | Jane Fonda | Won | |
| Academy Awards | Best Original Screenplay | Andy Lewis and Dave Lewis | Nominated | |
| British Academy Film Awards | Best Actress in a Leading Role | Jane Fonda | Nominated | |
| Edgar Allan Poe Awards | Best Motion Picture Screenplay | Andy Lewis and Dave Lewis | Nominated | |
| Golden Globe Awards | Best Actress in a Motion Picture – Drama | Jane Fonda | Won | |
| Golden Globe Awards | Best Screenplay – Motion Picture | Andy Lewis and Dave Lewis | Nominated | |
| Gotham Independent Film Awards | Classic Film Tribute Award | Klute | Won | |
| Kansas City Film Critics Circle Awards | Best Actress | Jane Fonda | Won | |
| London Film Critics' Circle Awards | Best Director | Alan J. Pakula | Won | |
| NAACP Image Awards | Outstanding Actor in a Motion Picture | Donald Sutherland | Won | |
| NAACP Image Awards | Outstanding Actress in a Motion Picture | Jane Fonda | Won | |
| National Society of Film Critics Awards | Best Actress | Jane Fonda | Won | |
| New York Film Critics Circle Awards | Best Actress | Jane Fonda | Won | |
| Writers Guild of America Awards | Best Drama – Written Directly for the Screen | Andy Lewis and Dave Lewis | Nominated | |
