= A Life in the Balance =

1955 film by Harry Horner

- Directed by: Harry Horner; Rafael Portillo
- Written by: Georges Simenon (story Sept petites croix dans un carnet); Robert Presnell Jr. Leo Townsend
- Produced by: Leonard Goldstein
- Starring: Ricardo Montalbán; Anne Bancroft; Lee Marvin
- Edited by: George Crone; George A. Gittens
- Music by: Raúl Lavista
- Production companies: Tele-Voz S.A. Panoramic Productions
- Distributed by: Twentieth Century Fox
- Release dates: January 1955 (Preview); March 17, 1955 (London); July 22, 1955 (New York); July 27, 1955 (Los Angeles)
- Running time: 74 minutes
- Countries: Mexico, United States
- Language: English

A Life in the Balance is a 1955 American-Mexican thriller film directed by Harry Horner and Rafael Portillo and starring Ricardo Montalbán, Anne Bancroft and Lee Marvin. It was shot in Mexico and distributed in the United States by Twentieth Century-Fox.

== Plot ==
Antonio Gomez is a nearly destitute musician and widower with an 11-year-old boy named Paco in Mexico City. Trying to support Paco in the face of unemployment and neighbors who want custody of his son, Gomez argues with an ex-girlfriend over money that she owes him. His girlfriend is murdered by the religious fanatic serial killer terrorizing the city, who stabs his young female victims and leaves them with their arms folded. When neighbors report an argument that Gomez had with the murdered girl, the police presume that they are finally on the trail of the serial killer, and Gomez is their target.

At a pawn shop, Gomez meets Maria Ibinia, who accompanies him in the search for Paco. Gomez does not realize that a police dragnet is targeting him and that Paco witnessed this most recent murder and has been trailing the killer, but the killer spots Paco and kidnaps him. Paco is forced to accompany the killer over the course of a night while the killer asks God whom he should murder next.

Antonio and Maria learn what has happened to Paco, and, with the help of the police, attempt to locate Paco and his kidnapper before the killer commits another knife murder.

== Cast ==
- Ricardo Montalbán as Antonio Gómez (as Ricardo Montalban)
- Anne Bancroft as María Ibinia
- Lee Marvin as The Killer
- José Pérez as Paco Gómez
- Rodolfo Acosta as Lt. Fernando
- Carlos Múzquiz as Capt. Saldana
- Jorge Treviño as Sergeant
- José Torvay as Andrés Martínez
- Eva Calvo as Carla Arlota
- Fanny Schiller as Carmen Martínez
- Tamara Garina as Doña Lucrecia
- Pascual García Peña as Porter
- Tony Carbajal as Pedro

== Reception ==
In his syndicated column, Jimmie Fidler wrote: "[I]ts suspense moments are among the most gripping I have seen in a long series of reviews. Death hovers near our principals as a vital part of the plot, not dragged in for thrills. ... I do not hesitate to say that both youngsters and adults will shudder along through this one."

Critic Dorothy Masters of the New York Daily News wrote: "An extraordinarily suspenseful story by Georges Simenon loses some of its electric charge in the conductive apparatus set up in Mexico for bridging book and screen."

Jean Yothers of the Orlando Sentinel called A Life in the Balance "a nail-biting, edge-of-the-seat type picture" and Herb Rau of The Miami News called the film "a real interest-building police yarn" with "one of the best chase scenes in months."

== See also ==
- List of American films of 1955

== Bibliography ==
- Cox, James H. Muting White Noise: Native American and European American Novel Traditions. University of Oklahoma Press, 2012.
