= Georgia Schmidt =

American actress (1904–1997)

- Schmidt in The Monkees (1967)
- Born: August 26, 1904
- Died: April 18, 1997 (aged 92)
- Occupation: Actress
- Years active: 1962–1986

Georgia Schmidt (August 26, 1904 – April 18, 1997) was an American actress based in Los Angeles, California.

Schmidt was the original voice of the Mrs. Beasley doll made by Mattel. She is probably best known as playing the first Talosian alien in the first episode of the original Star Trek series titled "The Cage", later aired as "The Menagerie" in 1966.

In 1985, Schmidt participated in playing a prank on actor and country singer John Schneider for TV's Bloopers & Practical Jokes on NBC.

== Selected filmography ==
- 87th Precinct (1962, TV Series) as Hotchkiss
- House of the Damned (1963) as Priscilla Rochester
- Goodbye Charlie (1964) as Seamstress (uncredited)
- Bewitched (1965, TV Series) as Agatha
- Star Trek: The Original Series (1966, TV Series) as First Talosian (uncredited)
- The Monkees (1966-1967, TV Series) as Jane, the Leading Lady / Old Lady
- The Monkees (1967) – Jane in S2:E8, "Monkees Marooned"
- The Wild Wild West (1967, TV Series) as Scrub Woman
- Night Gallery (1971, TV Series) as Flower Lady (segment "Make Me Laugh")
- Family Affair (1971, TV Series) as Mrs. Beasley (a doll store owner who receives Buffy's Mrs. Beasley doll when Buffy chooses to let go of dolls in her life)
- The Andromeda Strain (1971) as Old Lady (Piedmont) (uncredited)
- Kansas City Bomber (1972) as Old Dame
- Dominic's Dream (1974, TV Movie) as Old Lady
- Little House on the Prairie (1974-1983, TV Series) as Adel Colie / Mrs. Grandy
- The Odd Couple (1975, TV Series) as Mabel / Mrs. Osgood
- Starsky and Hutch (1975, TV Series) as Maggie McMillan
- Police Woman (1975-1977, TV Series) as Old Lady / Elderly Lady #2
- The Happy Hooker Goes to Washington (1977) as Couple at Airport
- A Killing Affair (1977, TV Movie) as Mrs. Macy
- Goin' South (1978) as Florence
- Charlie's Angels (1979, TV Series) as Granny
- CHiPs (1979, TV Series) as Little Old Lady
- Kill the Golden Goose (1979) as Woman Patient
- Midnight Madness (1980) as Old Lady in Car
- Flo (1980, TV Series) as Inez
- WKRP in Cincinnati (1980, TV Series) as Elderly Woman
- Magnum, P.I. (1981, TV Series) as Old Lady in Accident
- The Incredible Hulk (1981, TV Series) as Librarian
- Terror at Alcatraz (1982, TV Movie) as Nancy Wheeler
- Knight Rider (1984, TV Series) as Little Old Lady
- Hill Street Blues (1984, TV Series) as Dorothy Fadden
- Highway to Heaven (1984-1986, TV Series) as Mrs. Caldy / Loretta (final appearance)
- The Twilight Zone (1985, TV Series) as Wife (segment "Night of the Meek")
- The Facts of Life (1986, TV Series) as Elderly Woman
