= Andy Lewis (screenwriter) =

American screenwriter (1925–2018)

- Born: Andrew Kittredge Lewis; August 5, 1925; Lexington, Massachusetts, U.S.
- Died: February 28, 2018 (aged 92); Walpole, New Hampshire, U.S.
- Education: Harvard University
- Occupation: Screenwriter
- Notable work: Klute (1971; Best Original Screenplay nominee)
- Children: 6

Andrew Kittredge Lewis (August 5, 1925 – February 28, 2018) was an American screenwriter. He was nominated for an Academy Award in the category Best Original Screenplay for the film Klute.

== Early life and education ==
Lewis was born in Lexington, Massachusetts, on August 5, 1925. He was the son of Harvard philosopher Clarence Irving Lewis and graduated from Harvard University in 1949 after returning from military service.

== Career ==
Lewis began his career in the 1950s, writing for the television series Omnibus, and went on to script episodes of Hudson’s Bay, Dr. Kildare, The Nurses, 12 O’Clock High, The Virginian and The F.B.I., as well as Profiles in Courage. He later co‑wrote Klute (1971) with his brother David E. Lewis, earning an Academy Award nomination. He retired from screenwriting in 1985 and had earlier co‑authored At Home With Tomorrow (1959) with architect Carl Koch.

== Personal life ==
Lewis lived in a house he had built for himself in New Hampshire. He had six children with their families, several grandchildren, his partner France Menk, and a cat named Anteros.

== Death ==
Lewis died in February 2018 of natural causes at his home in Walpole, New Hampshire, at the age of 92.

== Selected works ==
Year(s)	Title	Type	Notes
1971	Klute	Film	Co-writer (with David E. Lewis)
1964–1967	12 O’Clock High	Television	Episode writer
1964–1965	Profiles in Courage	Television	Episode writer

== Awards and nominations ==
Year	Award	Category	Work	Result
1972	Academy Awards	Best Original Screenplay	Klute	Nominated
