= Short Eyes (film) =

1977 film by Robert M. Young

- Theatrical release poster
- Directed by: Robert M. Young
- Screenplay by: Miguel Piñero
- Based on: Short Eyes by Miguel Piñero
- Produced by: Lewis Harris
- Starring: Bruce Davison; Jose Perez; Nathan George; Don Blakely; Shawn Elliott; Miguel Piñero; Joseph Carberry; Tito Goya; Kenneth Steward; Curtis Mayfield; Freddie Fender
- Cinematography: Peter Sova
- Edited by: Edward Beyer
- Music by: Curtis Mayfield
- Distributed by: Film League
- Release date: September 28, 1977
- Running time: 100 minutes
- Country: United States
- Language: English

Short Eyes is a 1977 American prison drama film directed by Robert M. Young and based on Miguel Piñero's play of the same name. It was filmed in the Manhattan House of Detention for Men, otherwise known as The Tombs.

The Wu-Tang Clan sampled dialogue from the film for the songs "Let My Niggas Live" and "Gravel Pit" in 2000.

== Plot ==
Short Eyes is set in an unnamed prison in New York City, whose inmates are predominantly African American or Puerto Rican. One day, Clark Davis, a young, middle-class white man accused of raping a young girl, arrives on remand. His fellow prisoners immediately turn on him—child molesters are considered the lowest form of prison life—except for Juan, one of the institution's older prisoners, who treats him with some dignity. "Short eyes" is prison slang for a prisoner convicted of child sex abuse.

Davis insists he doesn't remember raping the girl, but he admits to Juan that he has molested several other children. The prosecution's case against Davis is weak and, unless Juan tells prison authorities about Davis' confessions to him, it is only a matter of time before he is set free. As Juan struggles with what to do, the other prisoners plan to get rid of Davis permanently.

== Cast ==
- Bruce Davison as Clark Davis
- José Pérez as Juan
- Joseph Carberry as Charlie "Longshoe Charlie" Murphy
- Nathan George as "Ice"
- Don Blakely as El Raheem Johnson
- Tito Goya as "Cupcake"
- Shawn Elliott as Paco
- Bob Maroff as Mr. Nett
- Miguel Piñero as "Go-Go"
- Luis Guzmán as Prisoner
- Curtis Mayfield as "Pappy"
- Freddy Fender as Johnny "Johnny B"
- Wilfredo Hernández as "Cha-Cha"
- Tony DiBenedetto as Tony

== Music ==
Curtis Mayfield wrote the film's score, and appears in the film as a prisoner performing the song "Do Do Wap Is Strong In Here". The soundtrack was released on Mayfield's Curtom Records.
