= Steambath (play) =

1970 play by Bruce Jay Friedman

Steambath is the second play by American author Bruce Jay Friedman. It was first performed Off-Broadway at the Truck and Warehouse Theater where it opened on June 30, 1970, closing on October 18, 1970, after 128 performances.

This play presents the afterlife as a steam bath, in which recently deceased souls (who may not in every case realize that they are dead) continue to obsess about the same petty concerns that obsessed them in their lives. Ultimately, they are cast into another room offstage, which is represented by a dark void, by God, the steam bath's Puerto Rican attendant, with the help of his assistant Gottlieb. The new arrival Tandy at first refuses to accept what's happened, and when he finally does he pleads to be allowed to return to his life. Steambath was controversial when first produced for its obscene language (which was softened for its television version), its satirical take on religion, and some brief nudity.

Friedman claims to have been inspired to write the play in part because of a "bad experience with the food at a Chinese restaurant" that had him contemplating mortality.

== Cast ==
Anthony Perkins directed the original production which starred Perkins as Tandy, Hector Elizondo as the Attendant (God), Marvin Lichterman as Bieberman, Annie Rachel as Meredith, Conrad Bain as Old Timer, Mitchell Jason as Broker, Jere Admire as Young Man, Teno Pollick as 2nd Young Man, Eileen Dietz as Young Girl, Alfred Hinckley as Flanders, Gabor Morea as Gottlieb, Jack Knight as Longshoreman, and William Walsh as 2nd Longshoreman. Miguel Piñero would later play God. Elizondo won an Obie Award for his performance.

Initially Charles Grodin was cast in the role of Tandy, but was replaced by Perkins. Coincidentally, Grodin soon landed his breakthrough role as a comedy actor in the film The Heartbreak Kid, based on a short story by Steambath author Friedman.

== Other media ==
The play was then produced for PBS series Hollywood Television Theater in 1973 with José Pérez playing God, Bill Bixby playing Tandy, and Valerie Perrine as the blonde bombshell Meredith. Only 24 PBS affiliates carried the program.

Steambath became a TV series for six weeks on the cable network Showtime in 1984 starring Robert Picardo in the Tandy role, Janis Ward as Meredith, Al Ruscio as DaVinci, Rita Taggart as Blanche and Allen Williams as Gottlieb. José Pérez reprised his role as God, Neil J. Schwartz & Patrick Spohn reprised their roles as "The Two Young Men," and Burt Brinckerhoff returned to direct half of the episodes.

Along with Oh! Calcutta!, the play was spoofed as "Bathtub" in The Odd Couple episode "What Does a Naked Lady Say to You?"

In the film Fame, Ralph performs an excerpt from Steambath as part of his audition for the High School of Performing Arts. We do not see the audition itself, only Ralph's introduction: "I'm God, see? And God is Puerto Rican, you got that? Now, God works in a casa de steam, you know. It's a steam bath, right? . . . I'm God, see? That's why I'm standing on this chair, you got that? Good."

== Sources ==
- Interview with Bruce Jay Friedman by Derek Alger, PIF magazine
