= John Mahon (actor) =

American film, stage, and television actor (1938–2020)

- Born: John Patrick Mahon; February 3, 1938; Scranton, Pennsylvania, U.S.
- Died: May 3, 2020 (aged 82); Los Angeles, California, U.S.
- Education: University of Scranton (BA)
- Years active: 1973–2009
- Children: 2

John Patrick Mahon (February 3, 1938 – May 3, 2020) was an American film, stage and television actor. He was perhaps best known for playing Captain Gillette in the 2007 film Zodiac.

== Early life and education ==
Mahon was born in Scranton, Pennsylvania, the son of an attorney. Mahon had acted while at high school, and at university he met playwright Jason Miller, who encouraged him to audition for stage plays at Marywood College. Shortly after, Mahon joined the University Players.

Mahon studied classical languages and English literature at the University of Scranton. In 1950 he contracted polio, which paralyzed him for a time and left him without the full use of his left arm.

== Acting career ==
After graduating from college, Mahon moved to New York City, where he worked as the supervisor of two paper mills. After two years, he decided to try acting as a profession, appearing in off-Broadway productions while working as a taxi driver and waiter. In 1971, Mahon was nominated for a New York Drama Critics Award in the category Best Actor, for his performance in the play Nobody Hears a Broken Drum. He continued to appear on stage through the 1970s, also directing plays.

Mahon guest-starred in television programs including Frasier, Cagney & Lacey, Studio 60 on the Sunset Strip (7 episodes), Just Shoot Me!, Jake and the Fatman, Steambath, Knots Landing, Generations, The X-Files, Hill Street Blues, St. Elsewhere, Scarecrow and Mrs. King, Diagnosis: Murder, Hunter and The Rockford Files. In 1973 Mahon appeared in a small role in the film The Exorcist. Other film appearances included The People Under the Stairs, One False Move, Bad Influence, L.A. Confidential, The Couch Trip, Armageddon, Austin Powers: The Spy Who Shagged Me and Zodiac. In 1995, Mahon played the role of the chairman of the Joint Chiefs of Staff in the film The American President.

In 2014, Mahon wrote a memoir titled A Life of Make Believe: From Paralysis to Hollywood.

== Personal life and death ==
Mahon had two children. He died in May 2020 of natural causes at his home in Los Angeles, California, at the age of 82.

== Filmography ==
=== Film ===
Year	Title	Role	Notes
1973	The Exorcist	Language Lab Director	
1988	The Couch Trip	Police Captain	
1990	Bad Influence	Dr. Fielding	
1991	The People Under the Stairs	Police Sergeant	
1992	One False Move	Chief Jenkins	
1995	The American President	Chairman of the Joint Chiefs	
1997	L.A. Confidential	Police Chief	
1998	Armageddon	Karl	
1999	Austin Powers: The Spy Who Shagged Me	NATO Colonel	
2007	Zodiac	Riverside Captain	
2009	A Call to Arms	Major General Cosgrove	

=== Television ===
Year	Title	Role	Notes
1976	Collision Course: Truman vs. MacArthur	Hoyt Vandenberg	Television film
1976	The Blue Knight	SWAT Commander	Episode: "To Kill a Tank"
1976	Police Woman	Fireman	Episode: "Tender Soldier"
1976–1977	The Rockford Files	Various roles	3 episodes
1977	Police Story	Det. Leo Luna	Episode: "The Blue Fog"
1977	Eleanor and Franklin: The White House Years	Veteran	Television film
1977	A Killing Affair	Det. Shoup	Television film
1977, 1978	Kojak	I. A. D. Man / Lawton	2 episodes
1978	Someone's Watching Me!	Frimsin	Television film
1983	Manimal	Man	Episode: "Breath of the Dragon"
1984	Automan	The Policeman	Episode: "Zippers"
1984	Cagney & Lacey	DPA Clerk	Episode: "Baby Broker"
1984	Steambath	The Fan	Episode: "A Preacher and a Jock"
1985	Cover Up	Limo Driver	Episode: "Murder Offshore"
1985	Crazy Like a Fox	Lt. Doyle	Episode: "Fox in Wonderland"
1985	St. Elsewhere	Police Officer	Episode: "Cheers"
1985	T. J. Hooker	Mr. Zewecki	Episode: "The Chicago Connection"
1985	Simon & Simon	Minister	Episode: "Love and/or Marriage"
1985	Misfits of Science	Technician	Episode: "Guess What's Coming to Dinner"
1985	Knight Rider	Alfie Girdler	Episode: "Knight Racer"
1985	MacGyver	Vendor	Episode: "The Prodigal"
1985, 1986	Hill Street Blues	Mario / Detective McConnell	2 episodes
1986	Betrayed by Innocence	Bailiff	Television film
1986	Stingray	Desk Sgt.	Episode: "Sometimes You Gotta Sing the Blues"
1986	Mickey Spillane's Mike Hammer	Sergeant Cramer	Episode: "Dead Pidgeon"
1987	Six Against the Rock	Officer Bill Miller	Television film
1987	Hooperman	Chapell	Episode: "Aria da Capo"
1988	Shakedown on the Sunset Strip	Deputy Chief Evans	Television film
1989	Hunter	I.A.D. Officer #2	Episode: "Shoot to Kill"
1989	Generations	Captain Parker	2 episodes
1989	Baywatch	Arnold Anderson	Episode: "The Cretin of the Shallows"
1989	Billy Crystal: Midnight Train to Moscow	Cabinet Member	Television film
1990	Dallas	Captain Holgar	Episode: "A Tale of Two Cities"
1990	Jake and the Fatman	Jameson	Episode: "You Took Advantage of Me"
1990	Equal Justice	Detective Stassen	Episode: "The Price of Justice"
1990	Knots Landing	Various roles	3 episodes
1991	Flesh 'n' Blood	Holly's Dad	Episode: "Love Is a Many Splendored Thing"
1992	Murder Without Motive: The Edmund Perry Story	Inspector Hedges	Television film
1992	Final Shot: The Hank Gathers Story	LMU Coach	Television film
1992	Homefront	Bus Driver	Episode: "When the Stars Begin to Fall"
1992	Sinatra	Mr. Cleaves	2 episodes
1993	Space Rangers	Amb. Hardcastle	Episode: "Death Before Dishonor"
1993	Cutters	Dave	Episode: "Give 'Til It Hurts"
1993	Lifepod	Earth Corp Ship Commander	Television film
1994	Teresa's Tattoo	Coach Dickler	Television film
1994	Roswell	Red Hat Vet	Television film
1997	Profiler	Det. Spitz	Episode: "Blue Highway"
1998	Brooklyn South	Gene Donovan	Episode: "Dead Man Sleeping"
1998	The Pretender	Eugene Clark	Episode: "A Stand-Up Guy"
1998	Frasier	Uncle Walt Crane	Episode: "Beware of Greeks"
1998	Diagnosis: Murder	Fire Chief	Episode: "Resurrection: Part 1"
1998	The X-Files	General Wegman	2 episodes
1999	Strange World	Agent Milton	Episode: "The Devil Still Holds My Hand"
1999	Just Shoot Me!	Alan Drake	Episode: "Blackmail Photographer"
1999, 2000	Angel	Trevor Lockley	2 episodes
2000	Touched by an Angel	Wally	Episode: "A Clown's Prayer"
2000	Bull	Paul Catteo	Episode: "What the Past Will Bring"
2000	JAG	Admiral Rockerly	Episode: "A Separate Peace: Part 2"
2001	That's Life	Leo	Episode: "Touched by a Biker"
2001	The Division	Barry Constansas	Episode: "What Sharp Teeth You Have"
2001	Just Ask My Children	Judge Ferguson	Television film
2004	Cold Case	Colonel	Episode: "The Plan"
2005	Zoey 101	Mr. Bradford	Episode: "Prank Week"
2005	Star Trek: Enterprise	Adm. Gardner (Mirror)	Episode: "In a Mirror, Darkly"
2006–2007	Studio 60 on the Sunset Strip	George	7 episodes

=== Video games ===
Year	Title	Role	Notes
1999	Fleet Command	Admiral Julius Bennet, USN CINCPACFLT	
