= David Thornton (actor) =

American actor (born 1953)

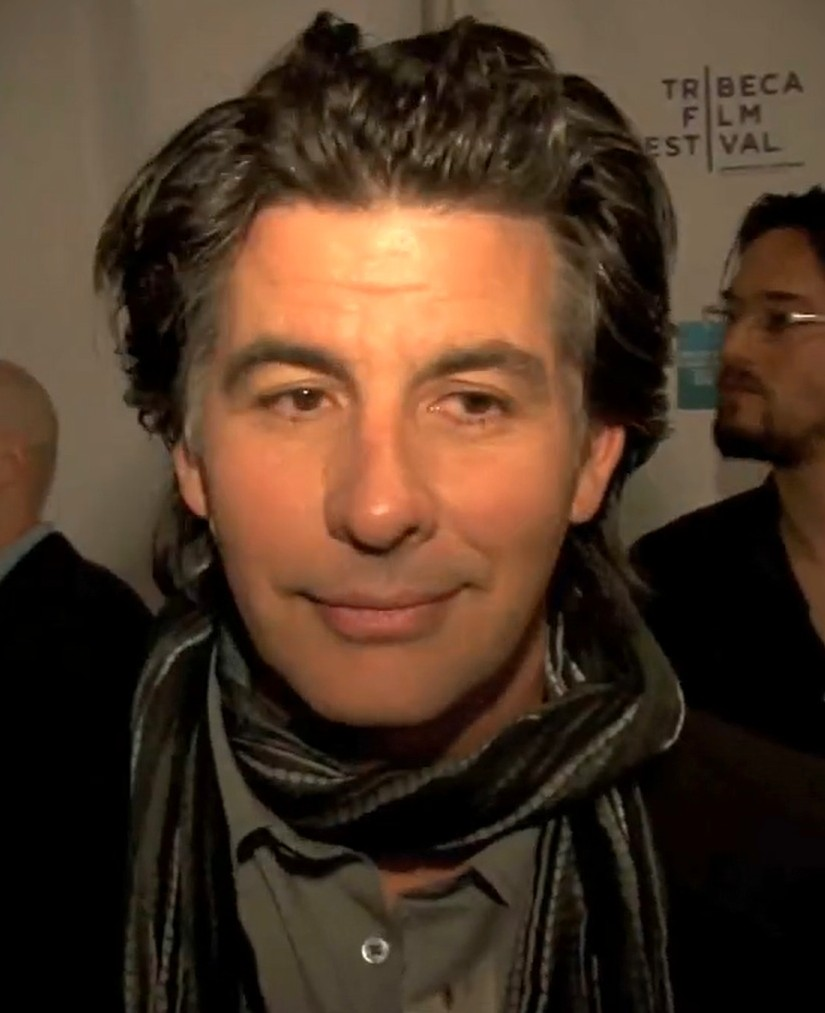
- Thornton in 2009
- Occupation: Actor
- Years active: 1983–present
- Spouse: Cyndi Lauper (m. 1991)
- Children: 1

David Farrington Thornton is an American actor. He has appeared in John Q, Home Alone 3 as Earl Unger, Law & Order, The Notebook, and The Other Woman, among other roles. He is the husband of singer, songwriter and actress Cyndi Lauper.

== Personal life ==
Thornton is the son of professor Robert Donald Thornton (1917–2006), who taught English at Harvard University among other institutions, and Grace Ellen (née Baker; 1919–2019). He graduated from Hamilton College and Yale Drama School and studied at Lee Strasberg's Actors Studio.

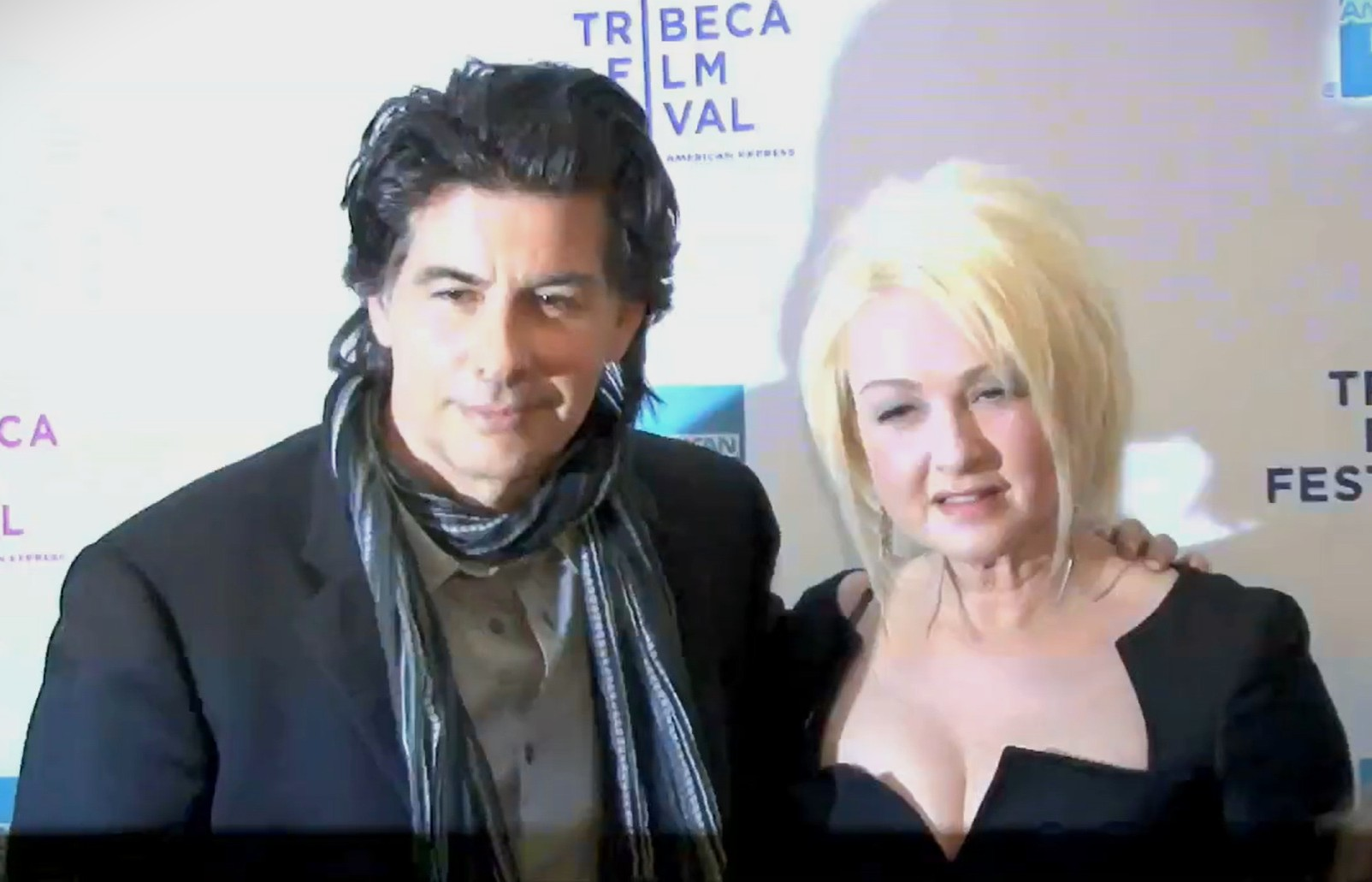
Thornton and Cyndi Lauper at the Tribeca Film Festival in 2009

Thornton met singer Cyndi Lauper on the set of the film Off and Running. They married in November 1991 and have a son, Declyn Wallace, who was born in 1997.

In 2005, the New York Court of Appeals ruled in favor of Thornton in Thornton v. Baron, which is considered a landmark decision in the New York real estate industry, specifically dealing with rent stabilization in New York.

=== Son's legal issue and lawsuit against Thornton ===
In March 2026, a lawsuit regarding Declyn's alleged 2020 sexual assault was filed naming Thornton as the defendant. Thornton was accused of having “enabled” the alleged incident “because he leased the penthouse" where the alleged sexual assault took place and “failed to take any action to supervise, restrict, or prevent his son from using the premises to perpetrate sexual violence” while knowing of the alleged “prior sexual violence against women and prior settlements of claims for similar conduct” regarding Declyn.

== Filmography ==
Key
†	Denotes films that have not yet been released

=== Film ===
Year	Title	Role	Notes
1988	Java Burn	Lomax	
1990	Men of Respect	Philly Como (Fleance)	
1991	Off and Running	Reese	
1994	Mrs. Parker and the Vicious Circle	George S. Kaufman	
1995	Jeffrey	Man #3	
1995	Search and Destroy	Rob	
1996	Unhook the Stars	Frankie Warren	
1996	Breathing Room	Brian	
1996	If Lucy Fell	Ted	
1997	Home Alone 3	Earl Unger	
1997	The Real Blonde	Alex	
1997	Office Killer	Gary Michaels	
1997	She's So Lovely	Saul Sunday	
1998	A Civil Action	Richard Aufiero	
1998	The Last Days of Disco	Berrie Rafferty	
1998	Illuminata	Orlandini	
1998	Hush	Gavin	
1998	High Art	Harry	
1998	Too Tired to Die	Lulu	
2000	Blessed Art Thou	Elmo	
2000	Blue Moon	Frank's Father	
2000	Dead Dog	Stevenson Nagel	
2001	The Girl Under the Waves	David	
2002	Swept Away	Michael	
2002	Garmento	Ronnie Grossman	
2002	John Q	Jimmy Palumbo	
2002	XX/XY	Miles	
2002	For Earth Below	Ron	Short film
2002	Private Property	Sam	
2002	100 Mile Rule	Jerry	
2003	Prologue	—N/a	
2004	The Notebook	John Hamilton	
2004	Noise	Elliot	
2004	The Warrior Class	Sancerre	
2005	Life on the Ledge	Mr. Eddy	
2005	Romance & Cigarettes	Urologist	
2006	Alpha Dog	Butch Mazursky	
2009	Here and There	Robert	
2009	My Sister's Keeper	Dr. Chance	
2010	Zenith	Berger	
2011	Jeremy Fink and the Meaning of Life	Simon Rudolph	
2011	Dirty Movie	Little Johnny's Dad	
2011	Fake	Tay Murphy	
2011	Trophy Kids	Charlie	
2014	The Other Woman	Nick	
2023	God Is a Bullet	Arthur Naci	

=== Television ===
Year	Title	Role	Notes
1983	Sessions	Marc	Television film
1985	Miami Vice	Lile	Episode: "Rites of Passage"
1986	Tales from the Darkside	Werewolf	Episode: "The Circus"
1988	Crime Story	Thalberg	Episode: "Femme Fatale"
1989	American Playhouse	Nelson's Pal	Episode: "Ask Me Again"
1993	Blind Spot	Frank	
1994	The Cosby Mysteries	—N/a	Episode: "The Lottery Winner Murders"
1995	New York News	—N/a	Episode: "New York News"
1995	New York Undercover	Alan Warwick	Episode: "The Shooter"
1996–2005	Law & Order	Defense Attorney Lionel Granger / Jeremy Cook / Paul Radford / Paul Medici	4 episodes
2000	The $treet	Carl Kettner	Episode: "Closet Cases"
2000	Law & Order: Criminal Intent	Kenny Strick	Episode: "Maledictus"
2003	Law & Order: Special Victims Unit	Lionel Granger	10 episodes
2013	Cyndi Lauper: Still So Unusual	Himself	12 episodes
2016	Elementary	Joe Ballantine	Episode: "A Study in Charlotte"
2017	Homeland	George Pallis	3 episodes
2020	Tommy	Robert 'Bob' Flake	Episode: "In Dreams Begin Responsibilities"
2021	A Time to Kill	James Lapan	Episode: "Killer on the Roof"

=== Video games ===
Year	Title	Voice Role	Notes
1995	Ripper	Twig	
