= Candice Azzara =

American character actress

- Born: May 18, 1945 (age 81); United States
- Other name: Candy Azzara
- Occupation: Actress
- Years active: 1965–present

Candice Azzara (born May 18, 1945) is an American character actress.

== Career ==
In the summer of 1965, she appeared as Eve in On the First Day, a one-act play written by David Graeme and directed by Charles Merlis at the 41st Street Playhouse in Manhattan. Billed as Candy Azzara, she made her Broadway debut in Lovers and Other Strangers in 1968. Additional stage credits include Jake's Women, Cactus Flower, Any Wednesday, Barefoot in the Park, and The Moon Is Blue.

She has starred in such films as House Calls, Fatso, Pandemonium, Easy Money, Catch Me If You Can, Ocean's Twelve, In Her Shoes and Little Boy.

Azzara was cast as Gloria in the second pilot of All in the Family, when it was titled "Those Were the Days" and the family name was Justice instead of Bunker. She was a regular on the sitcoms Calucci's Department and House Calls, had recurring roles on Caroline in the City, Who's the Boss?, Soap and Rhoda. She has guested on numerous series, including Diff'rent Strokes, The Wonder Years, The Practice, Kojak, Barney Miller, Trapper John, M.D., L.A. Law, CHiPs, Soap, One Day at a Time, The Love Boat, Night Court, Remington Steele, Murder, She Wrote, ER, Married... with Children and Joan of Arcadia.

== Partial filmography ==
=== Film ===
Year	Title	Role	Notes
1971	They Might Be Giants	Teenage Girl	Uncredited
1971	Who Is Harry Kellerman and Why Is He Saying Those Terrible Things About Me?	Sally	
1971	Made for Each Other	Sheila	
1972	Hail	The People	
1975	Hearts of the West	Waitress	
1977	The World's Greatest Lover	Anne Calassandro	
1978	House Calls	Ellen Grady	
1980	Fatso	Lydia	
1982	Pandemonium	Bambi	
1983	Easy Money	Rose Monahan Capuletti	
1988	Doin' Time on Planet Earth	Edna Pinsky	
1995	Unstrung Heroes	Joanie	
1998	Land of the Free	Waitress	
1999	The Hungry Bachelors Club	Hannibal Youngblood	
2002	Catch Me If You Can	Darcy	
2004	One Last Ride	Gina's Mother	
2004	Ocean's Twelve	Saul Bloom's Wife	
2005	In Her Shoes	Sydelle Feller	
2005	Bocce Balls	Aunt Tilly	
2014	Catch	Tere Quintana	Short
2015	Little Boy	Bertha	
2017	In Vino	Aunt Clara	

=== Television ===
Year	Title	Role	Notes
1969	N.Y.P.D.	Sally	1 episode
1973	Calucci's Department	Shirley Balukis	11 episodes
1973	Kojak	Milly Blasky, Agnes	2 episodes
1974	Rhoda	Sharon Kruger, Alice Barth	5 episodes
1975	The ABC Afternoon Playbreak	Rosalie	1 episode
1975	Wives	Mary Margaret	TV movie
1975	The Montefuscos	Blossom Bazussi	1 episode
1975	Fay	Al Cassidy's wife, Joyce	2 episodes
1975	Barney Miller	Audrey McManus, Miss Lambert, Miss Lamota	3 episodes
1976	The Practice	Naomi, The Madame	2 episodes
1977	CHiPs	Cheri	1 episodes
1977	Baretta	Rusty	1 episode
1978	Diff'rent Strokes	Delores	1 episode
1979	House Calls	Ellen Grady, Louella Grady	2 episodes
1979	Soap	Millie	6 episodes
1979	Trapper John, M.D.	Sherry	1 episode
1982	Remington Steele	Jackie	1 episode
1982	Divorce Wars: A Love Story	Sylvia Bemous	TV movie
1984	Night Court	Lorna Huebner	1 episode
1984	Murder, She Wrote	Marilee Coleson	1 episode
1986	L.A. Law	Sweetheart	2 episodes
1987	Roomies	Josephine	1 episode
1987	Married... with Children	Madame Inga	1 episode
1988	The Wonder Years	Mrs. Ermin	1 episode
1989	Doogie Howser, M.D.	Joanne Lester	1 episode
1994	ER	Mrs. Roth	1 episode
1995	Caroline in the City	Angie Spadaro	14 episodes
2003	Joan of Arcadia	Housewife God	1 episode
2010	Medium	Elderly Woman	1 episode
2010	Rizzoli & Isles	Mrs. Gold	1 episode
2010	Shake It Up	Funeral Attendee	1 episode
2011	Tyler Perry's House of Payne	Bianca	2 episodes
2018	Alex, Inc.	Aunt Louise	1 episode
