= José Pérez (actor) =

Puerto Rican actor (born 1940)

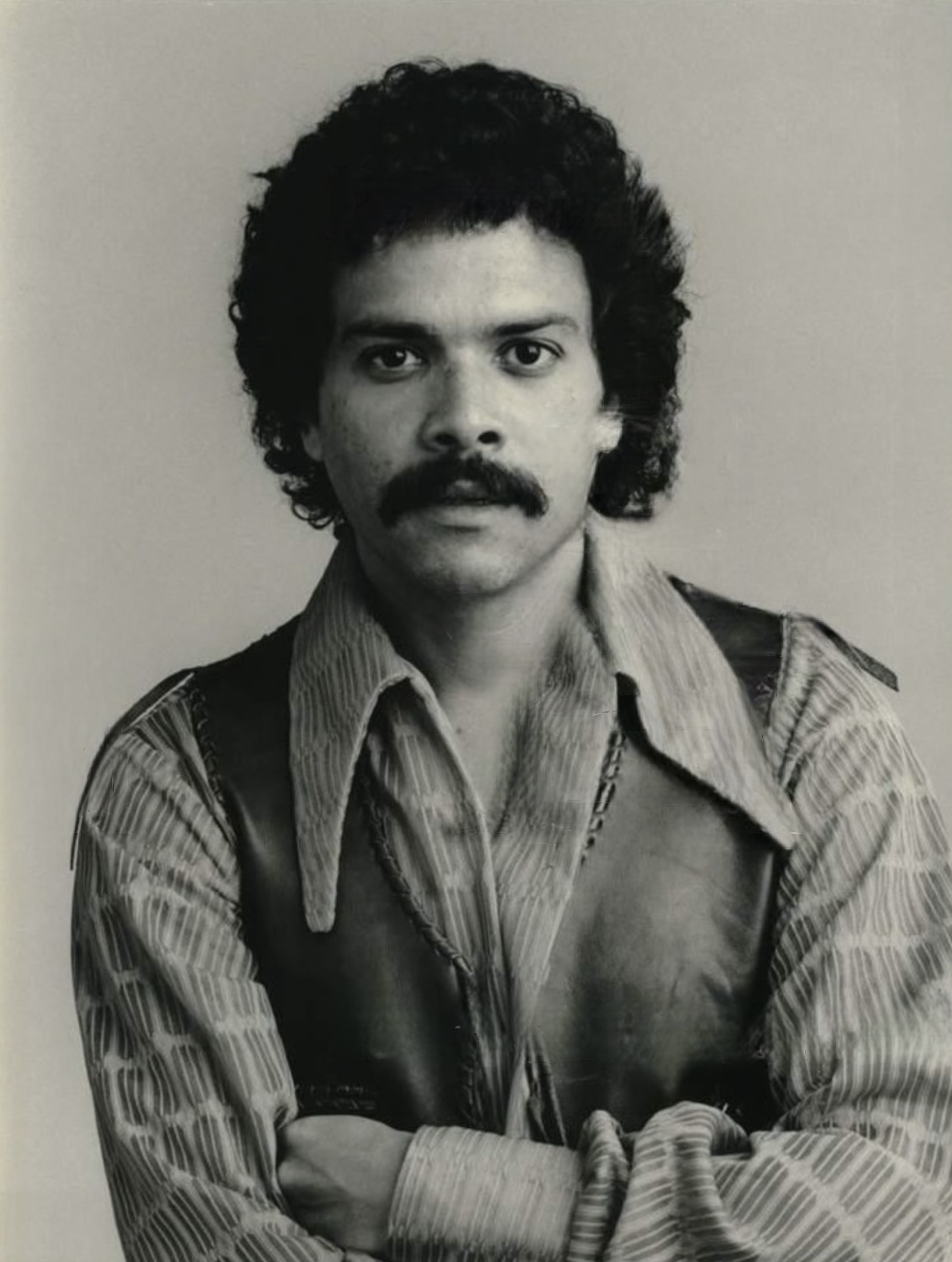
- Pérez in Calucci's Department, 1973
- Born: 1940 (age 84–85); Fajardo, Puerto Rico
- Occupation: Actor
- Years active: 1950–2003

José Pérez (born 1940) is a Puerto Rican actor. His acting career spanned fifty three years, comprising roles on Broadway, off-Broadway, on television and in films. He first caught the attention of audiences and reviewers as a child actor in the '50s and then had a second career as an adult beginning in the '60s through 2003. He is best known for his roles as the Attendant (God) in Steambath, Hector Fuentes in On the Rocks, Mike Torres in New York Undercover, and Juan in Short Eyes.

== Early years ==
Pérez was born in the town of Fajardo, on the eastern tip of Puerto Rico. His father, Arcadio Pérez, was a cigar maker who joined the Merchant Marine and moved his five children to New York City in 1948, when José was eight. He grew up in Manhattan's Hell's Kitchen neighborhood, where he worked as a shoeshine boy and carried bags at the Greyhound bus terminal.

He began acting at the age of nine, after a counselor from the East Side Boys’ Club approached him outside Lindy's Broadway delicatessen (or, by another account, the restaurant was "Toffenetti"), where he was shining shoes and opening car-doors for tips, and asked him if he would like to be in a show, and if he could sing. Pérez sang a birthday tune and the man then asked his parents if Pérez could audition for a part in the Broadway production of South Pacific, because the boy who had been playing the part of Jerome had gotten too tall for the role. He got the part, which he performed regularly, first as an understudy and later as principal, for the next two years.

After South Pacific Pérez got a role as a twelve year old Venetian boy in The Time of the Cuckoo, which he played on Broadway and continued to play when the production then toured the country. His portrayal brought him attention from critics and the national gossip-columnist Walter Winchell, who described him as "gifted".

His next theater role was in the off-Broadway play Me, Candido! in 1956, where he played the title character.

From 1952 through 1959 Pérez got roles on live television drama anthology series, including on NBC's The Philco Television Playhouse, Pond's Theater on ABC, CBS's Appointment with Adventure, NBC's Kraft Television Theater, The U.S. Steel Hour, Omnibus, and in the movie A Life in the Balance, where his performance received more critical attention than that of the stars.

== Later career ==
When Pérez was about 20 he attended Herbert Berghof Studio and Lee Strasberg’s acting class to improve his skills. He then played Roberto Escalante in the film The Young Savages, and acted in a string of off-Broadway plays, including Square in the Eye, The Ox Cart (La Carreta) and Goa, as well as two Broadway plays (Does a Tiger Wear a Necktie? and Camino Real). In each case, the production closed after a short run.

During this period Pérez was a guest star on the television series East Side/West Side, Hawk, N.Y.P.D. and contributed a small supporting role in the movie Born to Win.

Then, in 1971 he got the role of "Speed" in the Shakespeare in the Park production of Two Gentlemen of Verona, and continued to play the part on Broadway in the St. James Theatre production.

Pérez is best known for his portrayal of the attendant/God role in Steambath, both in the original PBS TV movie in 1973, where his performance was described as "by all odds the acting coup of this season", and the Showtime TV series in 1984, with the same name and based on the same premise, which earned him a nomination for an ACE Award.

In 1973 Pérez had a lead role as Ramon Gonzalez in the sitcom Calucci's Department. He next starred in the television pilot Aces Up and was billed as the star of the single ('75/'76) season television series On the Rocks as Hector Fuentes.

In 1977 Pérez costarred as Juan in the big screen adaptation of Short Eyes, and in 1979 he costarred as Nordi in Night-Flowers.

In 1982, he took the role of Police Inspector Carmona, opposite Robert Mitchum in the TV movie One Shoe Makes it Murder, where his performance was described as "steal[ing] every scene he's in." CBS considered his portrayal promising enough to create a spin-off of his character under the name Inspector Perez. Production did not progress past the pilot. Another pilot that he participated in which wasn't made into a series was King of the Building in 1987.

Perez had a featured role in the 1st portion of the 1985 film Stick opposite Burt Reynolds playing his friend who was then killed by the hero's nemesis.

From 1994 to 1996 Pérez had a recurring role on New York Undercover, appearing in seventeen episodes as Mike Torres, the drug-addicted father of primary character Detective Eddie Torres.

Pérez’ career included supporting roles on assorted TV series (including Miami Vice, Law & Order, Resurrection Blvd., The Adventures of Brisco County, Jr. and Murder, She Wrote), a few more off-Broadway plays, two TV movies and in ten more theatrically released movies through 2003.

== Social conscience and personal life ==
As an adult, Pérez, described as "a very serious ... man who would rather talk Shakespeare and Chekhov than television", stated "I'm not in this for money" and "My goal now is to … make a statement".

By the time he was 35, Pérez regretted the roles he had taken as a "member of a switchblade gang" as a youth, that he saw as reinforcing negative stereotypes about Latinos.

After Calucci's Department, Pérez was offered the part of Chico in Chico and the Man, but turned the role down because he considered the series to be insulting to the Mexican community.

He saw his portrayal of the role of the character Juan in the movie Short Eyes as a chance to "say something as an artist that he [felt needed] to be said" and to "help right the image of Puerto Ricans on the screen."

"We’ve never been given the characteristics of sensitivity and intelligence that are attributed to everyone else." [said Pérez] His role as the most humane character among a group of ... prison inmates ... belies that trite stereotype. Perez [felt] that Puerto Ricans are the "immigrants … being looked down upon" [at this time] "but I think ‘Short Eyes’ will help change all that."

One reason Pérez took the role in On the Rocks was, having read about the Attica Prison riot, which had taken place a few years previously, he wanted to "speak for the guys inside. We got to walk a fine line … but maybe we can make a comment."

Pérez was arrested twice himself. As a youth, he was driving without a license, and as an adult in Los Angeles he jaywalked on Hollywood Blvd. He had no identification on him and the officer questioning him did not believe he was "an actor from New York ... playing the role of God", so he spent the weekend in jail.

Pérez almost gave up acting to start a trucking business with a friend after Does a Tiger Wear a Necktie? closed, because he was tired of the uncertainty and waiting tables to get by. Then he got the role in Two Gentlemen of Verona and his acting career continued.

Pérez married Marion Levine in 1984. At that time he lived in Greenwich Village and had an apartment in Los Angeles. His parents still lived in the same neighborhood where he grew up, his father a cook and his mother a seamstress.

== Theatre credits ==
=== Broadway ===
Title	Opening and Closing Dates	Role	Notes
South Pacific	4/7/1949–1/16/1954	Jerome (Alternating performances 1950-‘52)	Played French planter's son
The Time of the Cuckoo	10/15/1952–5/30/1953	Mauro	Empire Theatre; 263 Performances
Does a Tiger Wear a Necktie?	2/25/1969–3/29/1969	Ponti	Belasco Theatre; with 58 total performances
Camino Real	1/8/1970–2/21/1970	Abdullah	Repertory Theatre of Lincoln Center 52 Performances
Two Gentlemen of Verona	12/1/1971-5/20/1973	Speed	St. James Theatre; 614 Performances

=== Off-Broadway ===
Title	Theatre	Dates	Role	Notes
Me Candido!	Greenwich Mews Theatre	10/15/1956-3/3/1957	Candido	159 performances
Square in the Eye	Lucille Lortel Theatre	5/19/1965-6/13/1965	Luis	31 performances
The Ox Cart (La Carreta)	Greenwich Mews Theatre	12/19/1966-2/26/1967	Chaguito	83 performances
Goa	Martinique Theatre	2/22/1967-3/17/1967	Goan Nationalist	30 performances
Two Gentlemen of Verona	Delacorte Theatre (New York Shakespeare Festival)	7/22/1971-8/8/1971	Speed	14 performances
The Taming of the Shrew	Delacorte Theatre (New York Shakespeare Festival)	6/22/1990-7/22/1990	Grumio	27 performances
Eyes for Consuela	New York City Center/ Stage II	2/10/1998-4/5/1998	Viejo / Guitarist	64 performances
The Late Henry Moss	Peter Norton Space	9/24/2001-11/4/2001	Esteban	

== Writing credits ==
Production	Theatre	Opened	Credit
Eyes for Consuela	New York City Center/ Stage II	2/10/1998	Original Music

== Filmography ==
=== Film ===
Year	Title	Role	Notes
1955	A Life in the Balance	Paco Gomez	Played kidnapped youth.
1961	The Young Savages	Roberto Escalante	Played murder victim.
1971	Born to Win	Junior Conception	Supporting role
1977	Short Eyes	Juan	Played prisoner who befriends accused man
1979	Night-Flowers	Nordi	Played troubled war veteran
1983	The Sting II	Carlos	Played gangster's guard
1983	D.C. Cab	Mr. Ernesto Bravo	
1985	Stick	Rainy	Played murdered friend of lead
1990	Miami Blues	Pablo	
1991	Off and Running	J.W. (Woody) Vilela	Played murder victim
1994	Being Human	Santiago	
1994	Motorcycle Gang	Cop	
1998	The Mask of Zorro	Cpl. Armando Garcia	
2000	The Way of the Gun	Jose Perez	
2003	2 Fast 2 Furious	Jose	

=== Television ===
Year	Title	Role	Notes
1952	The Philco Television Playhouse	Pepe	"The Five Fathers of Pepe" As an Italian street kid.
1957	Kraft Television Theater	the Stranger	"Welcome to a Stranger"
1959	Omnibus	Toby	The Medium
1964	East Side/West Side	Paco/Tony	Season 1, Episode 1 "The Sinner" and Season 1, Episode 19 "The Street"
1966	Hawk	Lou Barrow	Season 1, Episode 8 "How Close Can You Get?"
1967	N.Y.P.D.	Lopez	Season 1, Episode 22 "Macho"
1973	Calucci's Department	Ramon Gonzalez	Recurring character
1973	Steambath (movie)	Attendant (God)	
1974	Aces Up (movie)	Jose Perez	Main character
1974	The Godchild (movie)	Sanchez	
1975	On the Rocks	Hector Fuentes	Recurring character
1982	One Shoe Makes it Murder (movie)	Inspector Carmona	Co-starring with Robert Mitchum
1983	Inspector Perez	Inspector Antonio Perez	Spinoff Pilot from movie One Shoe Makes it Murder
1984	Steambath (the Showtime series)	Attendant (God (aka 'Morty'))	Nominated for an ACE Award for his portrayal.
1984	Murder, She Wrote	Lt. Mike Hernandez	Season 1, Episode 4 "Hooray for Homicide"
1985	Miami Vice	Juan Carlos Silva	Season 2, Episode 7 "Junk Love"
1986	Courage (movie)	Officer Jose Morales	
1987	King of the Building	Hector	
1989	Miami Vice	Jorge "Miracle Man" Esteban	Season 5, Episode 20 Guest starring as the title character "Miracle Man"
1991	Law & Order	Roberto Diaz	Season 2, Episode 10 "Heaven"
1993	The Adventures of Brisco County, Jr.	Roberto	Season 1, Episode 11 "Deep in the Heart of Dixie"
1994	The Burning Season (movie)	Moacir	Father-in-law of the central character
1994-1996	New York Undercover	Mike Torres	17 episodes (seasons 1–2), as father of Det. Eddie Torres
2000	Resurrection Blvd.	Eddie Cervantes	2 episodes in first season
