= El Diablo (1990 film) =

1990 film directed by Peter Markle

- Written by: Tommy Lee Wallace; John Carpenter; Bill Phillips
- Directed by: Peter Markle
- Starring: Anthony Edwards; Louis Gossett Jr. Joe Pantoliano; John Glover; Robert Beltran; Jim Beaver
- Music by: William Olvis
- Country of origin: United States
- Original language: English

Production
- Executive producers: Debra Hill; John Carpenter
- Producers: Peter Burrell; Rick Nathanson; Joe Wizan
- Cinematography: Ronald Víctor García
- Editor: Stephen E. Rivkin
- Running time: 115 minutes
- Production company: HBO Pictures

Original release
- Network: HBO
- Release: July 22, 1990

El Diablo is a 1990 American Western comedy television film directed by Peter Markle. It stars Anthony Edwards and Louis Gossett Jr. The film was co-written by Tommy Lee Wallace, John Carpenter and Bill Phillips, and produced by Carpenter and Debra Hill.

El Diablo focuses on Billy Ray Smith (Edwards), a teacher living in Texas, as he tracks down the outlaw El Diablo (Robert Beltran), who has kidnapped one of Smith's students. Along the way, Smith meets up with professional gunfighter Thomas Van Leek (Gossett), who helps him recruit a team to take down the outlaw and save the girl.

== Plot ==
Billy Ray Smith is a timid young schoolteacher from Boston living in a rugged Texas town. One of his teenage students, Nettie Tuleen, has an unrequited crush on him. While Billy Ray reads a story to the class by his favorite author, Kid Durango, the town is invaded by a gang of outlaws led by El Diablo, who kidnaps Nettie. Billy Ray tries to intervene, pulling off one of the outlaw's heirloom spurs as Diablo rides away.

Billy Ray vows to rescue Nettie with the help of Kid Durango (reputed to be "the fastest gun in the West") despite not knowing how to ride a horse or shoot a gun. After accidentally killing his horse with an errant gunshot, he arrives by train in the town of Millennium in search of J.D. Shones, a sheriff who had apparently rode with Kid Durango. Billy Ray discovers that Shones is already dead, having been killed by the current sheriff, who is in turn shot in the back by an aging gunslinger named Thomas Van Leek, a friend of Kid Durango who offers his services to Billy Ray. However, when Billy Ray explains that he is pursuing El Diablo, Van Leek calls him a fool and abandons him. He later returns to save Billy Ray from a group of bounty hunters who mistakenly believe he killed the sheriff.

The next day, Van Leek begins to assemble a group of skilled professionals to aid them, using Diablo's spur as a calling card: Bebe Patterson, a blacksmith and old friend of Van Leek; a preacher and con artist named Autolycus; an explosives expert named Roberto "Bob" Zamudio; and a criminal known as Pitchfork Napier. Napier is later killed and replaced by the Native American, Dancing Bear, as revenge for Napier having slept with his wife. After retrieving Zamudio's hidden cache of dynamite, the party stops at a saloon where Billy Ray finally meets Kid Durango. However, he is shocked to learn that Durango (whose real name is Truman Feathers) is not the hero he was expecting, and that all of his stories were based upon Van Leek's exploits.

Upon spotting Pestoso, one of El Diablo's henchmen, Van Leek convinces Billy Ray to confront him in a showdown. Although terrified, Billy Ray stands his ground until Van Leek secretly snipes the henchman from a nearby bell tower. Afterwards, Pestoso's companion Chak Mol instructs Billy Ray to meet him alone the next morning at the "tree of death", while Kid Durango joins the group on their quest.

Chak Mol escorts Billy Ray into El Diablo's hideout, where he is bound to a tree before coming face-to-face with the outlaw. Though he offers to trade Diablo's spur for Nettie's release, Diablo declines before introducing Nettie as "Rosita", his new consort. Meanwhile, Autolycus and Zamudio are killed in a confrontation with Diablo's men, leaving Bebe to carry out their plan alone. He rolls toward the compound in his wagon loaded with Zamudio's dynamite, but his leg gets trapped before he can jump off. Laughing maniacally, Bebe sacrifices himself as a distraction for Dancing Bear and Van Leek to open fire on Diablo's henchmen. El Diablo escapes the shootout, taking Nettie with him. In the aftermath, Van Leek finds a hidden chest of gold, alluding to an earlier suspicion by Kid Durango that Van Leek was more interested in Diablo's riches than Nettie's rescue. Disgusted, Billy Ray leaves to find Nettie on his own.

After chasing the young woman into a cave, he is confronted by El Diablo. Their meeting is interrupted by Kid Durango who, inspired to prove himself as a hero, challenges Diablo to a duel and is gunned down. With his last breaths, he implores Billy Ray to kill Diablo and "complete the story". Diablo taunts Billy Ray before deciding to shoot him in the head, but Van Leek calls him out before he can pull the trigger. Diablo wounds and disarms him, but Billy Ray intervenes by shooting the outlaw in the back twice, much to Van Leek's amusement.

The deceased group members are buried and Billy Ray pays his final respects to Kid Durango, before returning Nettie home to her mother. As Billy Ray and Van Leek head out of town, a forlorn Nettie asks if he will be coming back, to which Billy Ray answers: "Someday." The townspeople respectfully acknowledge Billy Ray, as he and Van Leek discuss plans for a new book series based on their adventures together.

== Cast ==
- Anthony Edwards as Billy Ray Smith
- Louis Gossett Jr. as Thomas Van Leek
- Joe Pantoliano as Truman "Kid Durango" Feathers
- John Glover as Autolycus, The Preacher
- Robert Beltran as "El Diablo"
- M. C. Gainey as "Bebe" Patterson
- Miguel Sandoval as Roberto Zamudio
- Sarah Trigger as Nettie Tuleen
- Branscombe Richmond as Dancing Bear
- Jim Beaver as Spivey Irick
- Don Collier as Jake
- Ann Risley as Judith
- Nick Young as Deputy
- Geno Silva as Chak Mol
- Luis Contreras as "Pestoso"
- Jesse Doran as "El Triste"
- David Dunard as Jonathan "Pitchfork" Napier
- Craig Reay as Doc Murphy
- Don Pendergrass as Sheriff Epworth
- Kathleen Erickson as Mrs. Tuleen
- Todd Fitzpatrick as Lon
- Wilfredo Hernandez as "El Matador"
- Frank Koppala as Snake Man
- Sal Lopez as Sentry
- Robert Miano as Bandit #1
- Jak Castro as Bandit #2 (uncredited)

== Production ==
According to a 1980 issue of Cinefantastique magazine, it was originally intended for co-writer John Carpenter to direct El Diablo himself in 1980 as his next film after completing The Fog. That same year, writer and producer Debra Hill discussed the movie in an interview with the Courier Post, saying: "My Western is called El Diablo and I see it as being in the Howard Hawks vein, a combination of The Searchers and Journey to the Center of the Earth." In 1982, Hill again mentioned El Diablo, saying that she was set to produce and Carpenter would direct. However, he ultimately declined to do so, later saying that he was nervous about directing a Western. The project then lay dormant for an entire decade, before being directed by Peter Markle. Carpenter and Hill acted as executive producers.

== Reception ==
The film received positive reviews from Empire and Entertainment Weekly.
