= 41st Precinct, New York City Police Department =

NYPD Southern Bronx police precinct

Coordinates: 40.8163°N 73.8956°W

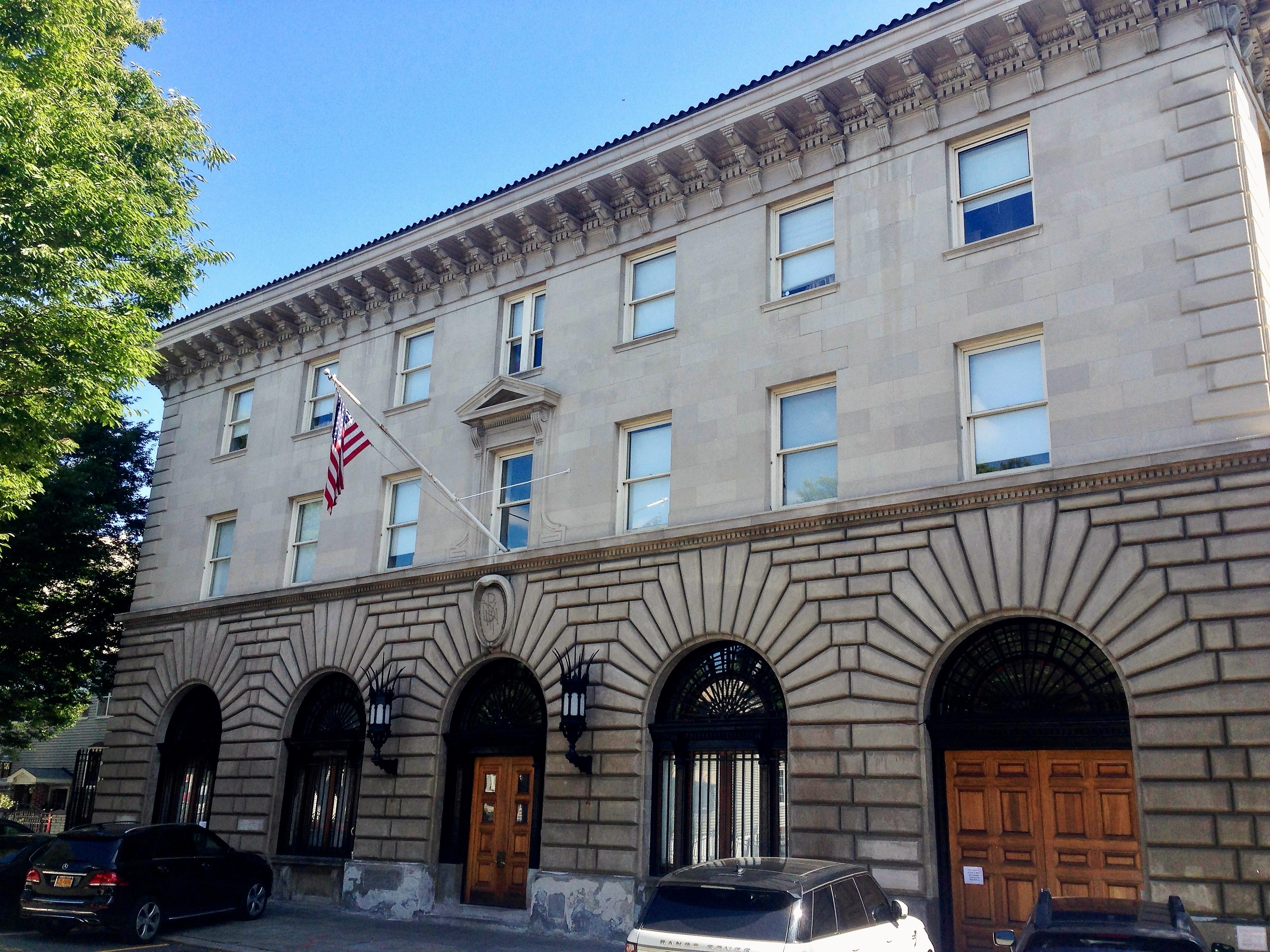
The 41st Precinct's former station house, known as "Fort Apache"

The 41st Precinct of the New York City Police Department (NYPD) is a police precinct serving the southern Bronx neighborhoods of Hunts Point and Longwood in New York City. The precinct's current station house is located at 1035 Longwood Avenue.

Originally headquartered at 1086 Simpson Street, the 41st earned the nickname "Fort Apache" during the 1970s when the South Bronx faced extreme levels of violent crime, arson, and drug epidemics. The moniker reflected the feeling among officers that the station house was like an isolated outpost under siege, which was popularized by the 1981 film Fort Apache, The Bronx, starring Paul Newman.

In 1993, the NYPD moved the precinct to its current Longwood Avenue facility, marking a symbolic break from the "Fort Apache" era. This move coincided with a dramatic, citywide drop in crime and a transition toward community-oriented policing.

== Station houses ==
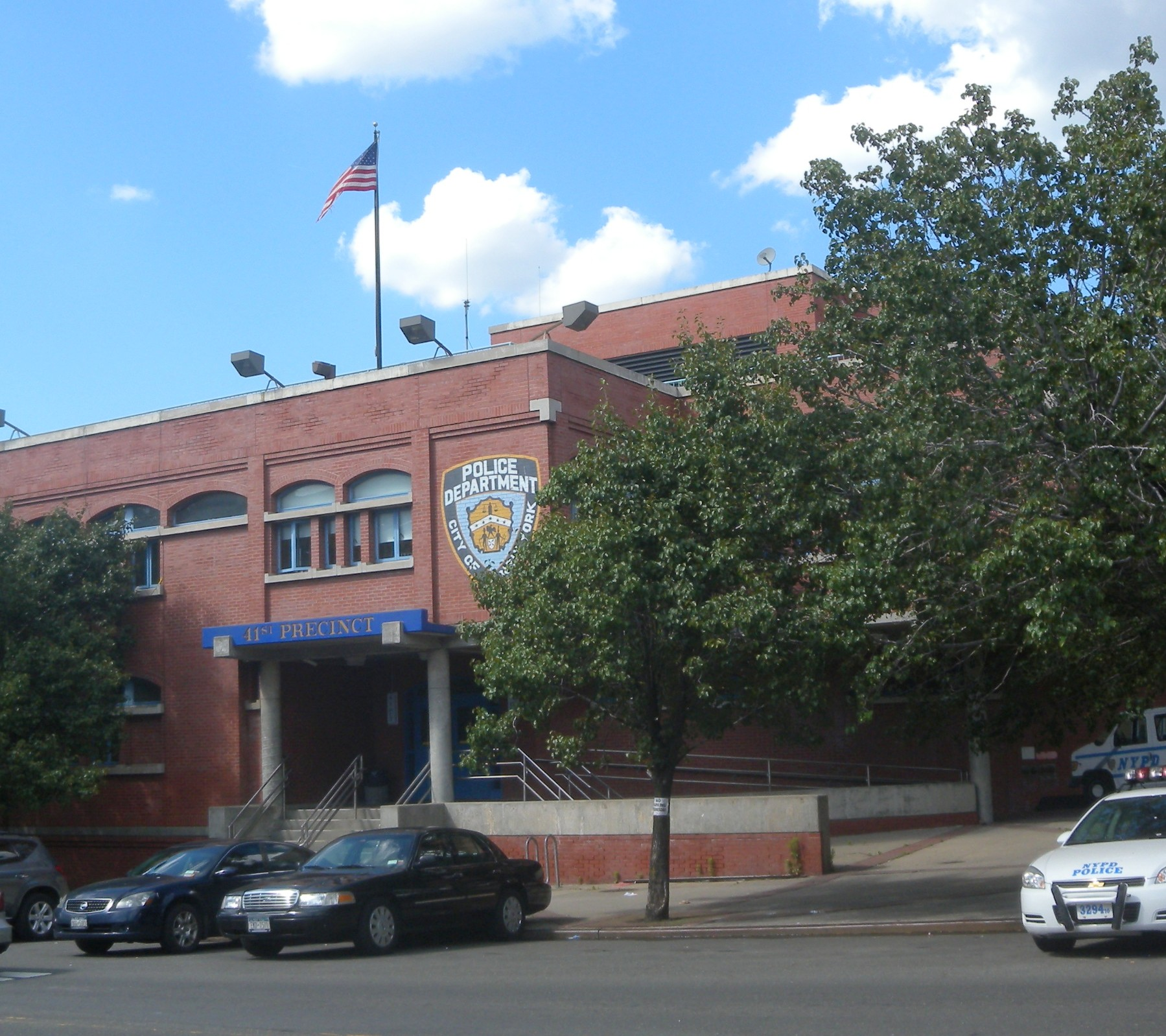
The current 41st Precinct station house on Longwood Avenue

=== 1086 Simpson Street (1914–1993) ===
The Simpson Street station house, designed in the Beaux Arts or Renaissance Revival style, opened in 1914. After closing in 1993 when the precinct's headquarters was moved, it was renovated and reopened in 1997 as the Bronx detective headquarters.

=== 1035 Longwood Avenue (1993–present) ===
In July 1993, the 41st moved into a new two-story, $13.5 million station house on Longwood Avenue.
