= Fort Apache, The Bronx =

1981 film by Daniel Petrie

- Theatrical release poster
- Directed by: Daniel Petrie
- Written by: Heywood Gould
- Produced by: Martin Richards; Thomas Fiorello
- Starring: Paul Newman; Ed Asner; Ken Wahl; Rachel Ticotin; Danny Aiello; Pam Grier; Kathleen Beller
- Cinematography: John Alcott
- Edited by: Rita Roland
- Music by: Jonathan Tunick
- Production companies: Producers Circle; Time-Life Films
- Distributed by: 20th Century-Fox
- Release date: February 6, 1981
- Running time: 125 minutes
- Country: United States
- Language: English
- Budget: $10 million
- Box office: $65.2 million

Fort Apache, The Bronx is a 1981 American crime drama film directed by Daniel Petrie. The film stars Paul Newman as Murphy, a hard-drinking, lonely veteran NYPD officer, and Ken Wahl as his young partner, Corelli, both of whom work in a crime-ridden precinct in the Bronx. Although Murphy's life takes a good turn when he falls in love with young nurse Isabella (Rachel Ticotin), the arrival of police captain Connolly (Ed Asner) threatens to tip the neighborhood's delicate balance into anarchy. Danny Aiello, Kathleen Beller and Pam Grier play supporting roles. The film was written by Heywood Gould and produced by Martin Richards and Thomas Fiorello, with David Susskind as executive producer.

It was filmed on location in the Bronx. Author Tom Walker sued Time-Life Television, alleging that the film infringed on his 1976 memoir Fort Apache, but lost after a lengthy court battle. The film received mixed reviews; however, Newman's acting was noted as a strength of the film. In addition, the film was the main inspiration for the long-running police drama series Hill Street Blues.

== Plot summary ==
Police officers face many challenges in the impoverished, high-crime South Bronx region of New York City. Among these officers are NYPD officers Murphy and Corelli, who work from the 41st Precinct, nicknamed "Fort Apache" because, to those who work there, it feels like an army outpost in foreign territory. The streets are full of dangerous criminals, such as violent gangs and drug dealers. Unemployment is at an all-time high, and the neighborhood is full of garbage and wrecked buildings. Murphy's life improves when he meets a young nurse, Isabella, as they start a romantic relationship.

The precinct is one of the most dilapidated in the department, approaching demolition and staffed mostly by officers who are unwanted by other precincts. Additionally, the precinct's officers do not represent the large Puerto Rican community, as only 4% of the officers are Hispanic in the largest non-English-speaking section of the Bronx. Corelli and Murphy attempt to maintain law and order by catching pimps and robbers, but they have conflicts with a newly appointed police captain, Connolly, and corrupt fellow officers. There is rioting due to alleged police brutality, as well as issues related to the deaths of two rookie cops who were shot by drug-addicted Charlotte. During the riot, Murphy and Corelli witness two officers beating up a teenager who was watching the events from a roof with his girlfriend, and they watch in horror as one of the cops angrily picks up the kid and throws him to his death on the street below.

Murphy becomes more intimate with Isabella, and they begin a sexual relationship. While she is sleeping, Murphy notices "track marks" on her skin. She admits that she uses heroin as a way to relax from working in such a stressful environment. Murphy and Corelli are emotionally tormented with the knowledge that they cannot turn in the murderous cops they witnessed; Murphy laments that he does not have the guts to smash through the "blue wall" and turn in the cops.

Charlotte, the killer of the two rookie cops, is never found. She is killed by a dealer whom she tried to kill, and her body is dumped with roadside trash. In turn, Charlotte's killers are killed in a shootout with Murphy when they take hostages in the hospital where Isabella works. Murphy is heartbroken when Isabella dies from a drug overdose, and he wrestles with the moral question of whether he should maintain the "blue wall" and not inform authorities about the officer who threw the teen off the roof. Murphy ultimately decides to resign and report the killing. He seems to be on the verge of quitting the force when he sees the purse-snatcher fleeing from a house that he burglarized. Murphy and Corelli chase the robber, and the image freezes as Murphy leaps to tackle him.

== Cast ==
- Paul Newman as John Joseph Vincent Murphy III
- Ed Asner as Dennis Connolly
- Ken Wahl as Andrew Corelli
- Danny Aiello as Morgan
- Rachel Ticotin as Isabella
- Pam Grier as Charlotte
- Kathleen Beller as Theresa
- Tito Goya as Jumper / Detective
- Miguel Piñero as Hernando
- Jaime Tirelli as Jose
- Clifford David as Dacey
- Sully Boyar as Dugan
- Dominic Chianese as Corelli's Father
- Michael Higgins as Heffernan
- Paul Gleason as Detective
- Randy Jurgensen as Cop at Bar
- Gilbert Lewis as Mob Leader
- Cleavant Derricks as Suspect #4
- Reynaldo Medina as Detective
- Norman Matlock as Lincoln

== Reception ==
The film opened at number one at the US box office, with an opening weekend gross of $4,565,000 from 795 theaters. After 12 days in 860 theaters, it had grossed $11,266,000. The film would gross more than $65 million worldwide at its time of release.

Upon its release, reviews were mixed. On Rotten Tomatoes, which collects both modern and contemporaneous reviews, the film has an 80% approval rating, based on 15 reviews; the average rating is 6.5/10.

Richard Schickel in Time called it "more like a made-for-TV movie". He added, "The film is not quite up to its star", and is "somewhere between Barney Miller and the works of Joseph Wambaugh". Of the acting, he wrote, "But mainly it is Newman, now 56, who gives Fort Apache its modest distinction."

Roger Ebert of the Chicago Sun Times called it "the most complete collection of cop-movie clichés since John Wayne played a Chicago cop in McQ". He criticized the number of unnecessary scenes and "story threads that lead nowhere". Ebert said about Newman that he is "good in his role", but called the film more of a TV show.

Variety labeled the film "a very patchy picture, strong on dialog and acting and exceedingly weak on story", and criticizes it for its lack of depth.

Nick Sambides Jr. at AllMovie called it a "flinty but otherwise forgettable character study".

Newman called the New York Post "a garbage can" after it published a photo of him on the set with a caption indicating that it portrayed a film crewperson "ward[ing] off a group of Hispanic youths protesting the film", which Newman claimed actually portrayed the crewmember warding off photographers. Because of the dispute, the Post banned him from its pages, even removing his name from films in the TV listings.

== Legal issues ==
Local community groups threatened to file suit against the producers because of the way it depicted their neighborhood in the Bronx, and for the depiction of ethnic minorities (primarily Blacks and Puerto Ricans). Because of this pressure, some changes were made to the script and a note was added to the title card at the beginning of the film.

In 1976, Tom Walker, a police officer who had been stationed at the 41st precinct, published Fort Apache, a non-fiction book about his experiences there. After the release of the film, Walker filed a lawsuit against its producers and writers, alleging copyright infringement. Among other things, Walker argued, "Both the book and the film begin with the murder of a black and a white policeman with a handgun at close range; both depict cockfights, drunks, stripped cars, prostitutes and rats; both feature as central characters third- or fourth-generation Irish policemen who live in Queens and frequently drink; both show disgruntled, demoralized police officers and unsuccessful foot chases of fleeing criminals."

Walker lost in federal district court, and again on appeal. The appeals court ruled that these are stereotypical ideas, so called "scènes à faire" (French for "scenes that must be done"), and that copyright law does not protect concepts or ideas. The court ruling stated: "The book Fort Apache and the film Fort Apache: The Bronx were not substantially similar beyond [the] level of generalized or otherwise nonprotectible ideas, and thus [the] latter did not infringe copyright of [the] former."

Newman also filed a claim against Time-Life, claiming that they had undersold the TV rights (on which he was due 15%) by selling to HBO for $1.5 million and not offering it to others, as well as underreporting foreign-distribution receipts by more than $3.75 million, on which he was due 12.5%. An agreement was settled out of court.

== See also ==
- List of American films of 1981
- Fort Apache
- Fort Apache (film)
- List of hood films
