= On the Rocks (American TV series) =

- Genre: Sitcom
- Based on: Porridge by: Dick Clement; Ian La Frenais
- Starring: Rick Hurst; Tom Poston
- Composer: Jerry Fielding
- Country of origin: United States
- Original language: English
- No. of seasons: 1
- No. of episodes: 23

Production
- Running time: 30 minutes
- Production company: John Rich Productions

Original release
- Network: ABC
- Release: September 11, 1975 – May 17, 1976

On the Rocks is an American television sitcom that aired on ABC from September 11, 1975 to May 17, 1976. Originally telecast after Barney Miller, ABC promoted the two shows with the tagline "Funny cops, and funny robbers". It is based on the British series Porridge.

== Premise ==
The series centers on the inmates of Alamesa Minimum Security prison. The main setting is usually the cell block containing Hector Fuentes, Lester DeMott, and Nicky Palik.

== Cast ==
- Rick Hurst as Cleaver
- Jose Perez as Hector Fuentes
- Bobby Sandler as Nicky Palik
- Hal Williams as Lester DeMott
- Tom Poston as Mr. Sullivan
- Mel Stewart as Mr. Gibson

== Episodes ==
No.	Title	Original release date
1	"Old Fish, New Fish"	September 11, 1975
2	"To Catch a Thief"	September 18, 1975
3	"The Wagers of Sin"	September 25, 1975
4	"The Legacy"	October 2, 1975
5	"Mr. Lonelyhearts"	October 9, 1975
6	"Champion"	October 16, 1975
7	"Peace and Quiet"	October 23, 1975
8	"Dear John"	October 30, 1975
9	"Sullivan's Finest Hour"	November 13, 1975
10	"Homesick Blues"	November 20, 1975
11	"The Great Escape"	November 27, 1975
12	"The High and the Mighty: Part 1"	December 4, 1975
13	"The High and the Mighty: Part 2"	December 11, 1975
14	"Friendly Persuasion"	December 18, 1975
15	"The Underground Movement: Part 1"	January 8, 1976
16	"The Underground Movement: Part 2"	January 12, 1976
17	"A Test of Character"	January 19, 1976
18	"Testing, Testing"	January 26, 1976
19	"Free and Clear"	February 9, 1976
20	"High Noon"	February 16, 1976
21	"The Desperate Hours"	February 23, 1976
22	"I'll Never Forget What's Her Name"	March 29, 1976
23 24	"Retrospective: Parts 1 & 2"	May 17, 1976
