= Wilfredo Hernández =

Puerto Rican actor

- Born: May 25, 1950; Santurce, Puerto Rico
- Died: February 19, 1990 (aged 39)
- Occupation(s): Television and Film actor

Wilfredo Hernández (25 May 1950 - 19 February 1990) was a Puerto Rican actor.

== Filmography ==
=== Films ===
- 1971 The French Connection (uncredited)
- 1976 Marathon Man as Street Gang #5
- 1977 Short Eyes as "Cha-Cha"
- 1978 Oliver's Story as Community Activist
- 1983 Deal of the Century as Rojas
- 1986 8 Million Ways to Die as Hector Lopez

=== Television ===
- 1982 Voyagers! as Manuel
- 1982 Tales of the Gold Monkey as Moro Aid
- 1985 Hill Street Blues as Santiago's Buddy
- 1985 Stingray (TV Movie) as Purser
- 1988-1989 Matlock as C.J. / Man In Bar
- 1989Falcon Crest as Francisco
- 1990 El Diablo (TV Movie) as "El Matador"
- 1990 Adam 12 (TV Series) as Gunman (final appearance)
