= Tito Goya =

American actor

- Born: Andrew Butler; April 4, 1951
- Died: December 1, 1985 (aged 34); Travis County, Texas, U.S.
- Occupation: Actor
- Years active: 1974–1984

Tito Goya (born Andrew Butler; April 4, 1951 – December 1, 1985) was a Puerto Rican actor known for his portrayal of "Cupcakes" in the 1977 film Short Eyes.

Goya appeared in Marathon Man (1976), Andy Warhol's Bad (1977), All That Jazz (1979), Going in Style (1979), Night of the Juggler (1980) and Fort Apache, The Bronx (1981). His final acting appearance was on Miami Vice (1984) as Carlos Mendez, a drug-dealer's liaison. Goya grew up in Brentwood, New York with his mother Carmen, stepfather Mario, his brothers, Jacob, Hector, Charlie, Richard & his sister Milagros. Goya was arrested in 1984 for a murder that occurred in Austin in 1978. In 1985, Goya died of cirrhosis while free on bond pending trial in Texas. Goya is buried on Long Island, New York.

== Filmography ==
Year	Title	Role	Notes
1976	Marathon Man	Melendez	
1977	Andy Warhol's Bad	Manuel Rivera	
1977	Short Eyes	Cupcake	
1979	All That Jazz	Attendant	
1979	Going in Style	Gypsy Cab Driver	
1980	Night of the Juggler	Pimp #2	
1981	Fort Apache the Bronx	Jumper / Detective	
