= Calucci's Department =

American television sitcom

- Genre: Sitcom
- Created by: Joseph Bologna; Renée Taylor
- Starring: James Coco; Candice Azzara; Jack Fletcher; Bill Lazarus; Peggy Pope; Jose Perez
- Theme music composer: Marvin Hamlisch
- Country of origin: United States
- Original language: English
- No. of seasons: 1
- No. of episodes: 11

Production
- Executive producer: Robert Precht
- Producer: Howard Gottfried
- Production locations: Manhattan, New York City, New York, United States
- Running time: 30 minutes
- Production company: Sullivan Productions

Original release
- Network: CBS
- Release: 14 September – 28 December 1973

Calucci's Department is an American television sitcom broadcast by CBS. It premiered on September 14, 1973, and after failing to compete in the ratings against NBC's Sanford and Son, was canceled after the December 28, 1973, episode. It was replaced on January 11, 1974, by the 13-week Dirty Sally series, a half-hour western starring Jeanette Nolan and Dack Rambo.

The series focused on Joe Calucci, the supervisor of a New York City unemployment office. His day was spent dealing with a disparate group of claimants, the petty squabbles among the members of his staff (represented by a cross-section of ethnic backgrounds), the frustrations of governmental red tape and his infatuation with his secretary Shirley. Except for its setting, the show was similar to the British hit Are You Being Served?, which had premiered in 1972.

== Principal cast ==
- James Coco as Joe Calucci
- Candy Azzara as Shirley Balukis
- Rosetta LeNoire as Mitzi Gordon
- Peggy Pope as Elanie Fusco
- Bill Lazarus as Jack Woods
- Jack Fletcher as Oscar Cosgrove
- Jose Perez as Ramon Gonzalez

== Episodes ==
Episode #	Episode Title	Original Airdate	Episode Summary
1	"The $80 Heist"	September 14, 1973	After the $80 he has collected from staff is stolen, Calucci does some detective work to find the culprit, but becomes a psychoanalyst and peacemaker in the process.
2	"Calucci, His Brother's Keeper"	September 21, 1973	Gonzalez asks Calucci for $400 after having his life threatened by loan sharks.
3	"Calucci, the Matchmaker"	September 28, 1973	When Calucci's date with Shirley also involves finding a date for Elaine, he and Gonzalez go to great lengths to find her a date.
4	"Calucci Goes on a Diet"	October 5, 1973	Calucci's trip to the doctor for stomach pains results in a directive to lose weight, an edict he finds it increasingly difficult to focus on.
5	"Winners and Losers"	October 12, 1973	After Calucci is told that a member of his office staff must be fired, it becomes an incredibly difficult decision for him.
6	"The Bloom is Off the Rose"	October 19, 1973	Calucci is upset when he finds out that his secretary and girlfriend, Shirley, once had another man in her life.
7	"Life is an Anchovy"	November 2, 1973	The office staff is concerned when the usually sour Woods is grumpier than usual because of problems at home.
8	"A Mother's Love"	November 9, 1973	When Cosgrove begins to act neurotically, Calucci attempts to diagnose his problems. However, he doesn't count on the prescription for the cure from Cosgrove's mother.
9	"Gonzalez's Thrill"	November 16, 1973	Confirmed bachelor Gonzalez appears ready to take the plunge into matrimony when he buys an engagement ring after meeting Samantha.
10	"Calucci and the Chicken or the Egg"	November 23, 1973	Calucci finally gets up the courage to take Shirley home to meet his mother.
11	"Calucci's Raison D'Etre"	November 30, 1973	Gonzalez decides that there must be more to life than the office, setting Calucci off on a soul-searching quest for the meaning of his own.
