= A Killing Affair (1977 film) =

- Also known as: Behind the Badge
- Genre: Crime
- Screenplay by: E. Arthur Kean
- Directed by: Richard C. Sarafian
- Starring: Elizabeth Montgomery; O. J. Simpson; Rosalind Cash; John Mahon; Todd Bridges; Priscilla Pointer; Allan Rich; Charles Robinson; John P. Ryan; Dean Stockwell; Dolph Sweet
- Composer: Richard Shores
- Country of origin: United States
- Original language: English

Production
- Executive producer: David Gerber
- Producer: James H. Brown
- Cinematography: Al Francis
- Editor: Ken Zemke
- Running time: 100 minutes
- Production companies: Columbia Pictures Television; David Gerber Productions

Original release
- Network: CBS
- Release: September 21, 1977

A Killing Affair (also known as Behind the Badge) is a 1977 American made-for-television crime drama film starring Elizabeth Montgomery and O. J. Simpson. The film originally aired on CBS on September 21, 1977.

== Plot ==
Elizabeth Montgomery and O. J. Simpson star as homicide detectives pursuing a killer played by Dean Stockwell. While working on the case, the partners begin having a heated romantic affair.

== Cast ==
Actor	Role
Elizabeth Montgomery	Vikki Eaton
O. J. Simpson	Woodrow York
Rosalind Cash	Beverly York
John Mahon	Det. Shoup
Priscilla Pointer	Judge Cudahy
Allan Rich	Capt. Bullis
Charles Robinson	Buck Fryman
John P. Ryan	Flagler
Dean Stockwell	Kenneth Switzer
Dolph Sweet	Lt. Scotty Neilson
Todd Bridges	Todd York
Fred Stuthman	Lukens Switzer
John Steadman	Cooks
Michael Durrell	Cabrillo
Stephen Parr	Sgt. Boyle
Georgia Schmidt	Mrs. Macy

== Reception ==
A Killing Affair received generally positive reviews, with particular praise for O. J. Simpson. People called it Simpson's "best dramatic performance to date."

John J. O'Connor of the New York Times wrote,

"A Killing Affair" is an odd mixture of cliché and quietly powerful statements and perceptions. With David Gerber as executive producer, it has the invaluable asset of a first-rate production. Mr. Simpson tends to settle into an acting monotone, but his personality is so basically attractive that he is able to get maximum results with minimum effort. Miss Montgomery accomplishes the difficult task of transforming a somewhat hardened and cynical professional into a vulnerable but unsentimental human being. And Rosalind Cash is superb as Mrs. York, uncompromising in her portrait of a loving woman being forced into the role of a shrew. Everything works out for the best in the end, of course, but even the resolution is acceptable and quite moving.

A Killing Affair received a 29% Nielsen rating, finishing second to Charlie's Angels in its time slot.

There was relatively little controversy generated by the interracial romance between the protagonists. Montgomery and Simpson did not receive any significant hate mail, though one Southern CBS affiliate did receive a bomb threat after the film aired.
