= Off and Running =

- UK theatrical release poster
- Directed by: Edward Bianchi
- Written by: Mitch Glazer
- Produced by: Aaron Russo; William C. Carraro
- Starring: Cyndi Lauper; David Keith
- Cinematography: Andrzej Bartkowiak
- Edited by: Rick Shaine
- Music by: Mason Daring
- Production companies: Aaron Russo Entertainment; HBO (uncredited)
- Distributed by: Orion Pictures
- Release date: 1991
- Running time: 86 minutes
- Country: United States
- Language: English

Off and Running is a 1991 American comedy mystery film directed by Ed Bianchi, written by Mitch Glazer, and starring Cyndi Lauper and David Keith. Orion Pictures originally had plans to give this movie a wide release, but due to the company's financial problems at the time, the movie went straight to video in the United States by HBO Home Video, a division of film financer HBO. It was, however, released in theaters in the United Kingdom on June 12, 1992 by Rank Film Distributors.

== Plot ==
Lauper stars as a beautiful mermaid-themed lounge singer and actress who gets involved with a caring but troubled man (played by Jose Perez). Because of his involvement with horse racing and breeding (and consequent mafia ties), the man is murdered in front of her, and she goes on the lam to escape his killers. On the way, she takes on the company of a professional golfer and a rebellious pre-teen boy, and together they attempt to unravel the mystery behind her slain lover's past.

== Cast ==
- Cyndi Lauper as Cyd Morse
- David Keith as Jack Cornett
- Johnny Pinto as Pompey
- David Thornton as Reese
- Richard Belzer as Milt Zoloth
- José Pérez as J.W. (Woody) Vilela
- Anita Morris as Florence
- Hazen Gifford as John K. Sasser
- Linda Hart as Gina Pompelli
- Tracy Roberts as Patti
- Dana Mark as April
- Heather Davis as Loree
- Sy Bondy as Norman
- Tony Jones as Curtis Valentine
- George Richards as Auctioneer
- Steven Reibel as Bid Spotter
- Mark Harris as Shriner
- Daniel L. Tasciotti as Interviewer
- Sydney Sandnes as Desk Clerk
- Jodi Lyn Wilson as Hostess (as Jodi Wilson)
- Gary Snow as Yuppie Father
- Nancy Duerr as Yuppie Wife
- Jonathan Dreyer as Yuppie Boy
- Nelson Oramas as State Trooper
- Joshua Spencer as Kid #1
- Kelly Scarberry as Little Girl
- Tim Hawkins as Banjo Man
- Harold Bergman as Sy
- Mary Alvarez as Reporter
- Jeff Rosenberg as Rich Playboy

== Release ==
The film was not widely distributed and coasted into notability mainly because of Lauper's involvement. The film fared far better in other countries where Lauper's popularity has sustained.

In Germany and Japan it was released under the title Moon Over Miami.

== Reception ==
Film critic Derek Elley from Variety gave it a negative review writing: A lame meld of comedy, thriller and romance, “Off and Running” doesn’t make it far out of the starting blocks.... With her pretzel voice and offbeat looks, Lauper still shows evidence of being a passable screwball thesp given a decent script and director, but she gets neither here.
