= Burt Brinckerhoff =

American actor, director, and producer

- Born: Burton Field Brinckerhoff; October 25, 1936 (age 90); Pittsburgh, Pennsylvania, U.S.
- Other name: Burton Brinckerhoff
- Education: Horace Mann School
- Occupations: Actor; Theatre director; Television director; Television producer
- Years active: 1953–2002
- Spouse: Zina Jasper (m. 1959; div. 1986)

Burton Field Brinckerhoff (born October 25, 1936) is an American actor, director, and producer. He was nominated for a Tony Award for his role as Igor in the play Cactus Flower (1965–1968), a Daytime Emmy Award for directing an episode of the television series The ABC Afternoon Playbreak (1973), and three Primetime Emmy Awards for directing episodes of the television series Lou Grant (1978–1982).

== Early life and education ==
Brinckerhoff was born in Pittsburgh, Pennsylvania, and initially raised in Ben Avon, Pennsylvania. His father, Rev. Dr. James Howard Brinckerhoff (1883–1957), was minister of the Ben Avon Presbyterian Church, and Marion Brinckerhoff (née Marion Russell Field; 1903–1997). The family moved to New York City when Burt was five years old. His mother was director of Director of Christian Education at Fifth Avenue Presbyterian Church.

Brinckerhoff became interested in acting while attending Horace Mann School. He performed in a senior class play and, after graduating, in summer stock theater.

== Acting career ==
A 1961 column by Dick Kleiner characterized Brinckerhoff "typical of the younger generation of actors" because he was "serious" and considered himself mainly a stage actor, only acting on television for the money.

He acted in several television anthologies in the 1950s, including several performances on Kraft Television Theatre, as well as episodes of Armstrong Circle Theatre and others. In 1958 Brickerhoff starred in the Broadway production of Blue Denim and appeared in the film The Goddess.

In the 1960s, he appeared in episodes of such television series as Naked City (1960 & 1961), Route 66 (1960), Alfred Hitchcock Presents (1961), The Fugitive (1963), The Man from U.N.C.L.E. (1964), Gunsmoke (1965), Combat! (1965), 12 O'Clock High (1965) and a five-episode story arc on Dr. Kildare (1965), The Doctors as Dr. Bill Prentice (May, June 1968). His film acting credits include The Goddess (1958) and The Greatest Story Ever Told (1965). His most recent acting credit was in Crime of the Century (1996).

In her memoir, Lauren Bacall called Brinckerhoff a "good actor" and highlighted Brinckerhoff's acting work in the late-1960s Broadway stage production of Cactus Flower, which earned him a nomination for the Tony Award for Best Featured Actor in a Play in 1966.

== Directing ==
Brinckerhoff directed episodes of Touched by an Angel, Beverly Hills 90210, Magnum, P.I., Moonlighting, Remington Steele, Another Day, and Newhart. He directed numerous miniseries and movies for television such as The Hamptons, Steambath, The Cracker Factory, and Brave New World, as well as the pilots for Three's Company, PBS/Two Hour Specials, and PBS Playhouse.

Brinckerhoff directed multiple episodes of several television sitcom series, including ABC's 9 to 5 (1982–83), and NBC's ALF (1987–89), as well as multiple episodes of several dramatic series, including Promised Land (1996–1997), Matlock (1990–91), Scarecrow and Mrs. King (1985–87), and Baretta (1975–77). He directed a number of plays specifically for television, including the 1991 A&E production It's Called the Sugar Plum starring Fisher Stevens and Ione Skye. Brinckerhoff was nominated for a Daytime Emmy Award for Outstanding Special Class Directing in 1974 for the episode "The Mask of Love" of the anthology series The ABC Afternoon Playbreak, and for three consecutive Primetime Emmy Awards for Outstanding Directing for a Drama Series from 1979 to 1981 for the episodes "Schools", "Hollywood", and "Pack" of the drama series Lou Grant.

He directed 27 episodes of the WB television series 7th Heaven from 1996 to 2002.

== Personal life ==
Brinkerhoff served in the U.S. Army National Guard in 1959. He married Zina Jasper on December 26, 1959; the couple divorced in 1986.

== Selected filmography ==
- Alfred Hitchcock Presents (1961) (Season 7 Episode 6: "Beta Delta Gamma") as Alan
- Gunsmoke (1964) (Season 10 Episode 16: "Run, Sheep, Run") as Tom Stocker
