= Laurie Zimmer =

American former actress

- Born: Laura Ann Zimmer; March 2, 1949 (age 77)
- Occupation: Actress (former)
- Years active: 1976–1979
- Notable work: Assault on Precinct 13 (1976)
- Spouse: James Bruce Steele
- Children: 2

Laurie Zimmer (born March 2, 1949; also credited as Laura Fanning) is an American former actress best known for her role as Leigh, the courageous secretary of the besieged police station, in John Carpenter's 1976 action film Assault on Precinct 13.

== Acting career ==
Zimmer had a brief acting career during the mid-to-late 1970s. After playing the female lead opposite Darwin Joston and Austin Stoker in Assault on Precinct 13, Zimmer appeared on stage in a Los Angeles production of the John Ford Noonan play, Getting Through The Night, where her performance was reviewed as "a model of prissiness and timorous self-importance". She then appeared (as Laura Fanning) in the 1977 comedy spoof Prime Time a.k.a. American Raspberry, and two 1977 French films: Jean Eustache's Une sale histoire ("A Dirty Story") and Charlotte Szlovak's Slow City, Moving Fast (also known by the French title D'un Jour a L'Autre). Shortly thereafter, Zimmer's career stalled, and, after playing her fifth role (in 1979's television movie Survival of Dana), she permanently retired from acting.

== Do You Remember Laurie Zimmer? ==
Charlotte Szlovak, who had directed Zimmer in Slow City, Moving Fast, released her documentary film Do You Remember Laurie Zimmer? in 2003. The film chronicles Szlovak's search to discover why Zimmer quit acting, where she is now, and what she is doing.

The film reveals that Zimmer now lives near San Francisco, California, works as a teacher, is married to actor Bruce Steele, and has two sons, one of whom is musician Julian Steele of the band The K.O. Bros.

== Filmography ==
Year	Title	Role	Notes	Ref.
1976	Assault on Precinct 13	Leigh		
1977	Prime Time a.k.a. American Raspberry	Miracle White Lady		
1977	Une sale histoire		Short	
1978	D'un jour à l'autre	Angela		
1978	ABC Weekend Special	Alvin's Mom	Episode: "Little Lulu"	
1979	Survival of Dana	Clerk	TV movie	
