= Do You Remember Laurie Zimmer? =

- Directed by: Charlotte Szlovak
- Written by: Charlotte Szlovak
- Release date: 2003
- Running time: 54 minutes
- Country: France
- Language: French

Do You Remember Laurie Zimmer? is a 2003 documentary film written and directed by French filmmaker Charlotte Szlovak. It was released in France under the alternate titles, Laura, disparue, recherchée and Qui se souvient de Laurie Zimmer?

== Synopsis ==
The film chronicles Szlovak's search to discover what happened to her long-lost friend, Laurie Zimmer, an American former actress who had a short, briefly promising, career during the mid-to-late 1970s.

Zimmer, who is best known for her performance as the female lead in John Carpenter's 1976 thriller film, Assault on Precinct 13, played the lead role in Szlovak's 1977 film Slow City, Moving Fast (also known by the French title D'un Jour a L'Autre), which was shot in Los Angeles, California and chronicles a day in the life of an actress who has given up her career and drives around Los Angeles looking for something to do.

Shortly after the filming of Slow City, Moving Fast, Zimmer quit acting and Szlovak never heard from her again. For over twenty years, Szlovak had been haunted by Zimmer's disappearance, by her abandonment of a once-promising acting career, and by the way her life seemed to eerily mirror the role she played in Szlovak's film. Szlovak then decides to search for Zimmer.

Szlovak travels to Los Angeles and tries to track Zimmer down through various means. She meets and interviews John Carpenter. She also hires a truck to drive around Los Angeles towing a large billboard emblazoned with Zimmer's photo, both of her professional names (Laurie Zimmer and Laura Fanning), and a request to contact Szlovak with any information about Zimmer.

Ultimately, Szlovak discovers that Zimmer lives near San Francisco, California, has become a teacher, is married, and has two sons.
