= Gunmen's Blues =

- Directed by: Eric Red
- Written by: Eric Red
- Produced by: Eric Red
- Starring: Edgard Mourino; Darwin Joston; Konrad Sheehan; Frank Ferrara
- Edited by: Eric Red
- Distributed by: Scorpion Releasing
- Release date: 1981
- Running time: 26 minutes
- Country: United States
- Language: English

Gunmen's Blues is a 1981 independent short film written and directed by Eric Red.

== Plot ==
A mysterious, middle-aged man wearing a dark suit and black leather gloves is the only customer in a Hoboken, New Jersey bar. He looks longingly at a picture of a woman that he keeps in his wallet. He then has a tense conversation with the bartender, in which he reveals that he once lived in Hoboken years ago, but is now passing through "on business" because he is a "travelling salesman."

While the man is in the bar's restroom, a teenage boy named Lake, dressed as a cowboy and brandishing a gun, bursts into the bar. He tells the bartender that the middle-aged man is actually the "Man with No Name" (a.k.a. "Mr. Smith"), a notorious hitman on the FBI's "most wanted" list. Using a makeshift silencer, Lake shoots and kills the bartender and ambushes the "Man with No Name" when the older man returns to pay his bill.

Lake, a violent but inexperienced gunman, holds the "Man with No Name" at gunpoint and reveals his intention to kill the hitman in order to bolster his own criminal reputation; but the hitman calmly outwits the teenager, lulls him into a false sense of security, and then knocks him out with a punch. However, Lake recovers, the two struggle, and Lake pins the hitman to the floor and prepares to shoot him in cold blood. During a brief exchange of words, the hitman realizes that (unbeknownst to the boy) his young challenger is the son that he was forced to abandon years earlier. Appealing to Lake's vanity, the hitman convinces the boy to engage him in a fair test of their respective skills: a fast draw.

The two have a showdown, which the "Man with No Name" easily wins by shooting the gun out of Lake's hand. Instead of killing the teenager, he shoots the boy's other hand. Demoralized, defeated, and suffering from the pain of two wounded hands, the teenager slumps to floor. The "Man with No Name" then reveals that he is Lake's father; he proves it by taking out his wallet and showing the boy the picture of the woman he was looking at earlier. The woman in the picture was the hitman's beloved, deceased wife as well as Lake's mother.

The hitman tells the boy that, years earlier, he had fallen in love with and married Lake's mother and had given up his life of crime. However, when Lake was a baby, a man came to challenge the hitman to showdown, and, not finding him home, killed the hitman's wife instead. Unable to take care of the boy, the hitman resumed his criminal career and abandoned Lake.

Finally reunited, father and son embrace, but their reunion is interrupted when the police show up outside the bar. In order to save Lake from the consequences of the bartender's murder, the hitman quickly rearranges to the crime scene to implicate himself and make it look like a botched robbery attempt. Before the cops storm the bar, he gives Lake his wallet, tells him that he can be anything he wants to be, but also advises him against becoming a gunman. As a policeman breaks through the door, the hitman levels his gun at the cop, winks at Lake, and is killed when the policeman shoots him in the chest.

== Cast ==
- Edgard Mourino as Bartender
- Darwin Joston as Man with No Name / Mr. Smith
- Konrad Sheehan as Lake
- Frank Ferrara as Cop

== Background ==
Filmed on location in Hoboken, New Jersey, Gunmen's Blues is a two-character film made while Eric Red was a student at the AFI Conservatory as his first film. He went broke trying to get national distribution for the film, and had to drive a cab in New York for a year to recoup. The film was followed by Red's second, the award-winning short Telephone.

The film is a modern-day western set in a Hoboken bar about a showdown between Smith (Darwin Joston), a notorious middle-aged hitman and the violent, impulsive, but inexperienced Lake (Konrad Sheehan), a young thug who wants to kill Smith in order to bolster his own criminal reputation. Lake kills the bartender (Edgard Mourino), but his wounded by Smith in their showdown. The confrontation leads to unexpected revelations and tragedy as the gunman realizes that his young challenger is the son he was forced to abandon years earlier.

== Release ==
Gunmen's Blues was broadcast on the USA Network's Night Flight series in the early 1980s, but it has never been released theatrically. The film was uploaded to Google Videos in 2009 and can still be viewed there.
