= Prime Time (1977 film) =

1977 comedy film directed by Bradley R. Swirnoff

- Poster bearing the original title Prime Time
- Directed by: Bradley R. Swirnoff
- Written by: John Baskin; Stephen Feinberg; Roger Shulman; Bradley R. Swirnoff
- Produced by: Marc Trabulus
- Cinematography: Matthew F. Leonetti
- Edited by: Geoffrey Rowland
- Music by: Ken Lauber
- Production companies: Chartwell Films; Warner Bros.
- Distributed by: Cannon Films
- Release date: 1977
- Running time: 75 minutes
- Language: English

Prime Time (also known as American Raspberry or Funny America) is a satirical 1977 sketch comedy anthology film directed by Bradley R. Swirnoff. The sketches spoof various popular television shows, television specials, and commercials of that time.

== Plot ==
=== Frame story ===
The frame story involves a politician in Washington D.C. who discovers that television broadcasts are being interrupted by an unknown source airing its own programming, including commercials. The President is notified, but he is at a loss as to what to do. The President brings in advisors, but they cannot come up with any suggestions other than to turn it off. Out of options, he simply nukes his own country to stop the broadcast.

=== Programs ===
- Special news program in which Congressman Gerald Simon of Montana is assassinated and the black newscaster is incorrectly arrested for it.
- Celebrity Sportsman presents The Charles Whitman Invitational
- Segments of the New York evening news in which the Supreme Court approves abortion up to the fifth year of life and a reporter takes a woman's complaint about a bill to her mechanic and is beaten up
- 9th Annual Sexual Deviation Telethon segments
- Manny's Nymphs, a parody of Charlie's Angels
- News report about the Woodfuckers of Merlyville

=== Commercials ===
- Trans Puerto Rico commercial
- Stay Down commercial to fight unwanted erections
- Commercial for the TV show Poodles for Christ
- Commercial for the Jacques Cousteau special The Search for Jimmy Hoffa
- Commercial for the TV show The Shitheads
- "Fire the Handicapped" ad
- Locker room "You're Gay" ad
- Commercial for the TV series Why Do Men Have Nipples?
- American Excess card commercial (parody of American Express commercials)
- "Travel India" ad
- "Morning Mist Enema Douche" ad
- Bullseye International Frozen Dinners "Biafra" flavor ad (parody of Birds Eye commercials)
- The Catholic Church "We are the owners of the world" ad
- Commercial for a "very special holiday presentation" featuring Jesus and Mary, mother of Jesus, set to a parody of Tim Hardin's "If I Were a Carpenter" in which Yahweh states, "Yes, you are a carpenter, and she is a lady, but you'd better not kid yourself. It's gonna my baby."
- Ad for news story "Sears repaints the Wailing Wall"
- "Sally Jones opens her mouth for milk" ad
- Mighty Mow ad in which a forest of old redwoods is cut down
- "John Henderson opens his mouth for milk" ad
- Commercial for the TV series Hook Line & Sinker
- Peterson's Retirement Home/Peterson's Pet Food ad
- Commercial for the TV series Old Ben Lucas
- "Come to South Africa" ad
- Urban Oil ad
- Commercial for the TV series Frontier Gynecologist
- "How do you explain the Muslims" commercial by the National Conference of Christians and Jews
- Message from the Truth in Advertising Council
- Bixby citizens band radio ad
- "Tassles, Tumors and Tits" news series ad
- Commercial for the TV series The Paranoids
- The General Tobacco Co. ad (parody of Christian Children's Fund ads)
- Tits "You can't have too much of a good thing" ad
- Miracle Magic detergent ad
- I.R.A. Ministry of Travel ad
- Buzzard School of Flying ad
- Ad for news story about cancer from mattresses
- Fabulous Great Hits from the 40's [sic] & Sounds of Our Times ad
- Ugandan Negro College Fund as (parody of United Negro College Fund ads)
- "Is it the Führer, or is it Mamorax?" ad (parody of "Is it live, or is it Memorex?" ads)
- Commercial for the TV series Celebrity Hanging
- Commercial for the TV series The Disgusting World of the Puma
- First National sperm bank ad
- Bronkman Memorial Park ad
- Winkles cereal ad
- 1977 Grand Broam car ad (parody of Lexus "smooth ride" ads)
- Clampax Menstrual Pontoon ad (parody of Tampax ads)
- Die Tough battery ad (parody of DieHard battery ads)
- "How do you spell relief?" ad (parody of Rolaids ads)
- Ad for news series about the nose
- Warsaw Olympics ad
- Parody of the Marines "We need a few good men" ad showing a recruit repeatedly getting punched in the face
- Public toilet "Plop, plop, fizz, fizz, oh, what a relief it is" ad (parody of Alka-Seltzer ads)

== Cast ==
- Paul Ainsley as Guard in Political Speech
- Wil Albert as Bruno
- Royce D. Applegate as Miracle White Announcer
- Meridith Baer as Switchboard Operator #2 (as Meredith Baer)
- Gene Borkan as Attendant in Retirement Home
- Jordon Brian as Boy in Winkles
- Cory "Bumper" Yothers as Boy in Bullseye Frozen Food (as Bumper)
- Marianne Bunch as Girl on Beach
- Twinkie Caplan as Louise
- Mel Carter as Storefront Person
- Joanna Cassidy as Lisa Allen
- Dort Clark as Overdrawn Depositor
- Katherine Dunfee Clark as Maxine Waldman
- Beatrice Colen as Mother
- Dee Cooper as Trucker
- Ken Davitian as Fat Bartender
- Hal K. Dawson as Grandpa
- Susan Doukas as Loan Officer
- Fred Dryer as Self
- Murphy Dunne as Danny Dumont
- John Fain as Storefront Person
- Laura Fanning as Miracle White Lady
- Art Fleming as Colonel Grant
- Aaron Fletcher as Wise Man
- Connie Fox as Susan Lancaster
- Fred Franklyn as Commissioner Johnson
- Dick Frattali as Host of Last Supper
- Kinky Friedman as Ole Ben Lucas
- Ben Frommer as Count
- Stephen Furst as Fat Gin Player
- George Furth as President
- Mousie Garner as Nostalgic Old Person
- Larry Gelman as Man with Groceries
- Gertrude Graner as Relief Card Player
- Bradley Green as Boy Scout (as Bradley Greene)
- Laurence Haddon as General Jackson
- Mary Hamill as Paranoid Woman
- Sandy Helberg as Mailman
- Basil Hoffman as Presidential Advisor
- Peter Kastner as David
- Rosanne Katon as Laura Franklin
- Suzanne Kent as Melissa
- Carl La Fong as Doctor Stay Down
- Hap Lawrence as Jogger
- Carole Mallory as Morning Mist Girl
- Arvid Malnaa as Wise Man
- James McCabe as Father
- Ira Miller as Jewish Deviate
- Marvin Miller as Henry Wideman
- Bret Morrison as Russian Premier
- Micky Morton as Ted
- Craig Richard Nelson as Bud Schuler
- Warren Oates as Celebrity Sportsman
- Maria O'Brien as Air Puerto Rico Stewardess (as Maria O'Brian)
- Jack O'Leary as Merlyville Sheriff
- Ken Olfson as Mr. Sloan
- Dick O'Neill as General Andrews
- Nancy Parsons as Lady Mailperson
- David Pendleton as South African Waiter
- Susan Peretz as Heather
- Shelley Pryor as Switchboard Operator
- Peter Ratray as Grand Brougham Announcer
- Cecil Reddick as 400 Pound Man
- Robert Ridgely as Celebrity Sportsman Host
- Mary Margaret Robinson as Nurse (as Mary Robinson)
- Bobby Romanus as Timmy Dorset
- Phil Roth as Doctor Burns
- Lucy Saroyan as Connie
- Ben Schlossberg as Dink (as Ben Schlosberg)
- Tom Scott as Announcer in Political Speech
- Pam Seamon as Mrs. Dorset
- Al Shafran as Wise Man
- Harry Shearer as Trucker's Friend
- Dave Shelley as Max (as Dave Shelly)
- Joseph Sicari as Man in Air Puerto Rico
- George Skaff as Martin Boorman
- David Spielberg as Mr. Dorset
- Jessica Swirnoff as Alice
- Ken Sylk as Artie
- Cynthia Szigeti as Dawn
- Lou Tiano as Pete
- Herb Voland as Admiral Taft
- Mike Wagner as Senator Simon
- Alan Wittert as Paranoid Man
- Harris Yulin as Charles Conlin
- Paul Zegler as Suspicious Man
- Mary Steelsmith as Count's blond girlfriend (uncredited)

== Release ==
Poster for the film under the title American Raspberry

The film was originally titled Prime Time when produced by Warner Bros. (showing "Prime Time" in the title card as well as playing a theme song titled "Prime Time"), and was released in some theaters under this title in 1977. The film was later retitled American Raspberry for distribution by Cannon Films. The film was rated R.

== Reception ==
Reviewer Graeme Clark of thespinningimage.co.uk gave the film a rating of 4 out of 10 stars, writing, "For some, tackling gags which rely heavily on prejudice, as this film does, would be enough to get the chortles flowing, but there's a meanspiritedness [sic] to much of the joking here that tends to freeze the laughter in the throat".

Reviewer Steve Kopian of unseenfilms.net wrote, "For the most part the movie is full of very funny low brow and topical humor. [...] Odds are you won't remember it in the morning but you will get some laughs out of it."

A review on the-unknown-movies.com reads, "I was surprised to find that despite some really lame material and poor production values, the movie had enough laughs and hilariously tasteless moments to be worth watching. [...] I'm recommending the movie, but as I stated earlier, there are several problems with the movie. First of all, the production values are rock-bottom, with some scenes taking place on a stage with little to no set dressing. Second is that the movie has been ineptly transferred to video. When a film is shot, there is usually some space above and below the picture that you never see - as long as the frame is positioned correctly on screen or video. Someone seriously goofed here, because in many shots you can actually see the spotlights on the ceiling."

A review by Paghat the Ratgirl on weirdwildrealm.com reads, "Some of the 'sketches' are only a half minute long & come in swift succession, just about never invoking the tiniest smile, & rushing to the next unfunny bit too swiftly for the viewer to think about how dumb each bit might be. [...] The takeover of the airwaves is for no other purpose but bad shtick that even Laugh-in wouldn't've used. And it's got the government scared schtickless."

A review by Jedadiah Leland on Through the Shattered Lens reads, "Sketch comedies are usually hit-and-miss and Prime Time is definitely more miss than hit. The majority of the film is made up of commercial parodies but, since most of the commercials being parodied are no longer on the air, the humor has aged terribly. [...] How did Warren Oates end up in a movie like Prime Time? Even great actors have bills to pay. As for Prime Time, it is the one Warren Oates film that even the most dedicated Warren Oates fan won't regret missing."
