= Le Cochon =

Le Cochon ("The Pig") is a fifty-minute featurette co-directed by Jean Eustache and Jean-Michel Barjol in 1970. Shot in a cinema verité style, it documents the traditional killing of a plump pig in a French rural village. Eustache had directed his first version of La Rosiere de Pessac (surrounding another annual tradition in his home village) in much the same unobtrusive style two years previously.
