= Night of the Wild =

2015 television film

- Written by: Delondra Williams
- Directed by: Eric Red
- Starring: Rob Morrow
- Theme music composer: Christopher Cano; Chris Ridenhour
- Country of origin: United States
- Original language: English

Production
- Producers: David Michael Latt; Paul Bales; David L. Garber; Lauren Elizabeth Hood; Chris Regina; David Rimawi; Dylan Vox
- Cinematography: Spencer Hutchins
- Editor: Ana Florit
- Running time: 89 minutes
- Production companies: Vox & Hound Productions
- Budget: $625,000

Original release
- Network: Syfy
- Release: October 3, 2015

Night of the Wild is a 2015 American television science fiction horror film directed by Eric Red and written by Delondra Williams. The film premiered on Syfy on October 3, 2015.

== Plot ==
A green meteorite lands in a quiet town and turns many local dogs into vicious killers.

== Cast ==
- Rob Morrow as Dave
- Kelly Rutherford as Sara
- Tristin Mays as Rosalyn
- Carmen Tonry as Danielle
- Jill Zarin as Liz
- Mary Katherine O'Donnell as Alice Wise
- B.D. Boudreaux as Bill
- Mason Guccione as Casey
- Darrell Chumley as Chester
- Eric Ashton Spooner as Firefighter Eddie
- Dalton Alfortish as Ray
- Shanna Marie Burris as Misty
- Dylan Vox as Seth
- Christin Rankins as Groomer
- Andre Bauth as Sandoval
- Maria Robles as Kim

== Reception ==
Reviewer Stabford Deathrage of culturedvultures.com called the film "unintentionally hilarious" and "completely ridiculous".
