= Sam Chew Jr. =

American actor, teacher (b. 1942)

Sam Chew Jr. (born August 20, 1942, Philadelphia, Pennsylvania) is a retired American actor and teacher, likely best known for his role in Serial (1980), and for playing both John F. Kennedy and Robert F. Kennedy on television.

After more than two decades in film and television, Chew utilized his voice for narrating the Discovery Channel series, Shark Week. He has been a member of the Academy of Motion Picture Arts and Sciences actor's branch for over 30 years. He later became a teacher on the Philadelphia Main Line.

In 1972 Chew and his family gave the family home Cliveden to the National Trust for Historic Preservation.

== Filmography ==
Year	Title	Role	Notes
1968	The Sweet Ride	Minor role	Uncredited
1969	Changes	Charlie	
1971	Escape from the Planet of the Apes		Uncredited
1971	Skin Game	Courtney	
1972	Conquest of the Planet of the Apes	Controller	Uncredited
1973	40 Carats	Arthur Forbes	
1973	This Is a Hijack	Pierce	
1974	Earthquake	Tony - Kathie's Husband	Television version only
1976	Rattlers	Dr. Tom Parkinson	
1976	Midway	Guard	Uncredited
1976–1978	The Bionic Woman	Mark Russell / Russ	8 episodes
1977	Young Joe, the Forgotten Kennedy	Jack Kennedy	
1978	F.I.S.T.	Peter Jacobs	
1978	The Incredible Hulk	Joe Arnold	Episode: "Stop the Presses"
1978–1979	Operation Petticoat	Lt. Kern	3 episodes
1979	Love and Bullets	Cook	
1980	Serial	Bill	
1980	The Misadventures of Sheriff Lobo	Governor's Aide	Episode: "The Dirtiest Girls in Town"
1982	Time Walker	Dr. Bruce Serrano	
1982	Voyager from the Unknown	Bruce Ismay	
1983	Voyagers!	Bruce Ismay	Episode: "Voyagers of the Titanic"
1983	10 to Midnight	Minister	
1983	Scarab	Raleigh	
1987	Disorderlies	Doctor	
1988	Stealing Home	Nathan Appleby	
1989	Kinjite: Forbidden Subjects	McLane	
1991	Oscar	Van Leland	
1998	Hyacinth	Orrin Lawson	(final film role)
