= Bad Moon =

1996 Canadian-American horror film

- Theatrical release poster
- Directed by: Eric Red
- Screenplay by: Eric Red
- Based on: Thor by Wayne Smith
- Produced by: James G. Robinson
- Starring: Mariel Hemingway; Michael Paré
- Cinematography: Jan Kiesser
- Edited by: Carroll Timothy O'Meara
- Music by: Daniel Licht
- Production company: Morgan Creek Productions
- Distributed by: Warner Bros.
- Release date: November 1, 1996 (United States)
- Running time: 79 minutes
- Countries: United States; Canada
- Language: English
- Budget: $7 million
- Box office: $1.1 million

Bad Moon is a 1996 horror film written and directed by Eric Red, and produced by James G. Robinson. The film is about a mother and son who are threatened by her brother, who struggles to overcome the curse of lycanthropy. It stars Michael Paré, Mariel Hemingway and Mason Gamble.

The film is based on the 1992 novel Thor by Wayne Smith, which mainly tells the story from the dog's viewpoint. Bad Moon was released by Warner Bros. on November 1, 1996. the film was panned by critics who praised Primo’s performance as Thor, the practical effects and creature designs, brutal gore, unique plot, and Paré’s performance as the main villain but criticized the CGI effects, screenplay, character writing, cast performances, pacing, ending, and tones. it also performed poorly at the box office, grossing just $1.1 million against a $7 million budget.

== Plot ==
During a work expedition in Nepal, photo-journalists Ted Harrison and his girlfriend, Marjorie, are attacked by a werewolf. The werewolf kills Marjorie - with Ted being bitten while trying to save her - before Ted in turn kills the werewolf with a shotgun.

Back in the US, Ted moves into a trailer in the woods to isolate himself. Eventually, he invites his sister, Janet, and his nephew, Brett, to a meal at his home by the lake. Upon seeing him, the family dog, Thor, runs into the woods. Picking up a scent, Thor is led to human remains hanging from a tree branch. Meanwhile, Ted lies to Janet, telling her that Marjorie left him and went back to Seattle. Janet invites him to stay with them, but he declines, insisting they leave before sunset.

The next day, authorities investigate the remains of several missing hikers and a Forest Ranger, found in the woods near Ted's trailer. Fearful of being caught, Ted calls Janet and accepts her offer. Upon arrival, Thor is again suspicious of Ted, acting hostile towards him. Later that evening, Thor follows Ted into the woods and finds him handcuffed to a tree whilst transformed into a werewolf. Meanwhile, Janet goes into the woods looking for Thor. Aware of the danger, Thor leads her back to the house.

The next morning, Janet sees a news report of the killings at the lake. She confronts her brother about not telling her his motive for accepting her invitation, yet asks him to stay permanently. Ted tries to warn her, advising she pay attention to Thor's sudden behavior changes, while hinting that the killer is a wolf. She ignores him. Later, as the sun sets, he leaves his trailer in hopes of chaining himself up again. Thor, knowing what is happening, barks until Brett lets him out of the house. He runs to the woods to find that Ted was too late, then follows Ted's trail back to the backyard. Ted attacks him but the dog fights back, waking Janet, who turns on the deck lights, scaring Ted away and only seeing an injured Thor. She then goes to Ted's trailer to tell him, where she finds a book about werewolves, with gruesome pictures of Marjorie and Ted's victims attached to it. She also finds a journal in which Ted details his turmoil in not finding a cure for his "disease”, and his hopes of finding peace near his family. Later that night, a traveling salesman, who had earlier tried to frame Thor for an attack, returns to Janet's yard with the intention of killing Thor. Instead, he is killed by Ted.

The next morning, the sheriff questions Janet about Thor, informing her of the salesman's death - his mutilated body was found near her property - and advises Janet to send Thor to the dog pound. Not believing Thor could be the killer, she confronts Ted, who provokes Thor to attack him. As a result, Thor is taken to the pound. Ted declares victory by urinating on Thor's doghouse, and becomes hostile towards Brett.

That night, Janet follows Ted into the woods, finding him mid-transformation. As he taunts Janet for ignoring his warnings, despite knowing the truth, she flees back to the house to retrieve a revolver hidden in the kitchen. Meanwhile, Brett manages to sneak out and free Thor from the dog pound. Thor returns home just as Ted is about to attack Janet. A vicious fight ensues, ending with Ted throwing Thor across the room, seemingly killing him. Ted nearly strangles Brett, who has just returned home, but Janet fires several rounds into him. Then, Thor throws himself at Ted, knocking them both through the window and into the yard. Ted, severely injured, retreats into the woods, with Thor tracking him down until sunrise. Thor finds Ted, now in human form. Injured and covered in blood, he tells Thor to put him out of his misery, in which Thor lunges at Ted, killing him. Thor returns home as Janet and Brett thank him for saving them, only for him to turn into a monstrous werewolf dog and roar at them. But it turns out to be just a nightmare as Janet wakes up, as Brett comforts her, as the two of them start petting Thor, who is still alive and wrapped in bandages after the fight.

== Cast ==
- Mariel Hemingway as Janet Harrison
- Michael Paré as Ted Harrison
- Mason Gamble as Brett Harrison
- Ken Pogue as Sheriff Jenson
- Hrothgar Mathews as Jerry "Flopsy" Mills
- Johanna Lebovitz as Marjorie
- Gavin Buhr as forest ranger
- Julia Montgomery Brown as reporter
- Primo as Thor

== Production ==
Eric Red acquired the rights to Wayne Smith's novel Thor as Red felt it had all the elements needed for a great horror film. The werewolf effects were created by Steve Johnson and his company XFX.

== Reception ==
=== Critical response ===
Bad Moon received mostly negative reviews from critics upon its initial release. On the review aggregator website Rotten Tomatoes, 27% of 11 critics' reviews are positive, with an average rating of 3.7/10.

Mick LaSalle of the San Francisco Chronicle was highly critical of the film, panning the film's script, poor special effects, and unconvincing monster costume. Joe Leydon from Variety felt that the film was "too silly to be suspenseful, yet not quite awful enough or intentionally funny enough to qualify as camp", and criticized Hemingway's performance as being unconvincing. The Austin Chronicle's Marc Savlov gave the film one and a half out of five stars, highlighting the film's direction, unconvincing special effects and monster costume, and unbelievable characters.

More positively, Kevin Thomas of The Los Angeles Times called the film "a straight-ahead horror picture with exceptionally well-written characters and well-directed actors." Chris Coffel of Bloody Disgusting said Bad Moon "succeeds with what you want in a trashy werewolf movie."

== Home media ==
The film was released on DVD on October 3, 2000. and on Blu-ray on July 19, 2016.

== See also ==
- Second weekend in box office performance § Second-weekend drop
- Good Boy (2025)
