= Time Walker =

1982 film by Tom Kennedy

- Time Walker film poster
- Directed by: Tom Kennedy
- Screenplay by: Tom Friedman; Karen Levitt
- Story by: Tom Friedman; Jason Williams
- Produced by: Dimitri Villard; Jason Williams
- Starring: Ben Murphy; Nina Axelrod; Behrouz Vossoughi; Kevin Brophy; James Karen; Austin Stoker; Darwin Joston; Antoinette Bower; Sam Chew Jr.; Shari Belafonte
- Cinematography: Robbie Greenberg
- Music by: Richard Band
- Distributed by: New World Pictures (United States and Canada); Manson International (International)
- Release date: November 1982
- Running time: 83 minutes
- Country: United States
- Language: English
- Box office: $1.8 million

Time Walker is a 1982 American science fiction horror film directed by Tom Kennedy.

The film received negative reviews from critics. Under the title Being from Another Planet, it was featured in Mystery Science Theater 3000 episode 405, which first aired on July 4, 1992.

The film was shown on the MeTV show Svengoolie on June 26, 2021.

== Plot ==
While California University of the Sciences Professor Douglas McCadden explores the tomb of the ancient Egyptian king Tutankhamun, an earthquake causes a wall in the tomb to collapse, revealing a hidden chamber. Inside, Douglas finds a mummy in a sarcophagus. Unbeknownst to Douglas, the "mummy" is not the body of a dead Egyptian, but an extraterrestrial alien in suspended animation, being wrapped up and buried alive thousands of years before and covered with a dormant green fungus.

The body is brought back to California and Douglas has it examined by Dr. Ken Melrose and X-rayed by student Peter Sharpe before a big press conference about the discovery. While reviewing the X-rays, Peter notices there are five crystals around the "mummy's" head. Peter steals the crystals and makes new X-rays to cover up his theft. He sells four of the crystals to students who are unaware of their origin. The second set of X-rays overdose the body with radiation. This causes the fungus to re-activate and the alien to awaken from suspended animation.

At the press conference the next day, one of the students touches the fungus on the sarcophagus, which eats away one of his fingers. The sarcophagus is then opened in front of the press to reveal that the mummy is gone. Ken and his colleague Dr. Hayworth attempt to identify the fungus and destroy it.

At first, everyone assumes that the mummy's disappearance is because of a fraternity prank. However, University President Wendell Rossmore wants to pin the "theft" on Douglas, so that he can give the Egyptian department's directorship to his flunkie, Dr. Bruce Serrano.

Meanwhile, the "mummy" tracks down the students who have the stolen crystals. The crystals are crucial components of an intergalactic transportation device that will allow the alien to return to its home planet. The alien violently reclaims its crystals, and, when he brutally attacks a female student, Lt. Plummer is called in to investigate the crime. As more students turn up dead or injured, Plummer believes that he is on the trail of a serial killer.

While Plummer conducts his investigation, Douglas translates the hieroglyphic text from the sarcophagus. He hopes it will reveal the identity of the mummy. The text reveals that Tutankhamun found the alien in a coma-like state. Thinking that the unconscious alien was a god, Tutankhamun and his attendants touched it and were killed by its infectious fungus. The king and the alien were then buried together in the king's tomb. Douglas, having figured out that the "mummy" is an alien, makes the connection between the alien and the crystals. He then traces the stolen crystals back to Peter, who admits to the theft and gives Douglas the one crystal he kept for himself.

In the end, Douglas, Wendall, Bruce, two students, a security guard and the alien all end up in a boiler room where the alien has set up its transportation device. The alien activates the device by placing the last recovered crystal on it; his mummy wrappings disintegrate, revealing his true form. The security guard urged by Bruce shoots at the alien, but Douglas leaps in front of the alien to protect it. As Douglas lies injured, the alien takes his hand, and the two disappear. A single crystal is left where the alien stood. Bruce grabs the crystal, and the fungus begins to destroy his hand, as the film ends stating: "To Be Continued."

== Cast ==
- Ben Murphy as Prof. Douglas McCadden
- Behrouz Vossoughi as Iranian Abdellah
- Nina Axelrod as Susie Fuller
- Kevin Brophy as Peter Sharpe
- James Karen as Dr. Wendell J. Rossmore
- Austin Stoker as Dr. Ken Melrose
- Darwin Joston as Lt. Plummer
- Antoinette Bower as Dr. Hayworth
- Sam Chew Jr. as Dr. Bruce Serrano
- Shari Belafonte as Linda Flores
- Bob Random as Jack Parker

== Production ==
Time Walker was produced by Dimitri Villard and Jason Williams. Williams, who starred in the 1974 sexploitation film Flesh Gordon, co-authored the story with Tom Friedman. It was distributed by New World Pictures. Skip Schoolnik edited the film.

The outside building of the University is California State University Northridge's Sierra Hall.

== Release ==
Time Walker was re-released for home video under a new title (and new opening and closing credits) in Spring 1991. This is the version that aired on MST3K.

Shout! Factory released it on DVD bundled with few other New World films: Lady Frankenstein, The Velvet Vampire, and Grotesque on September 27, 2011. Shout! later released it on Blu-ray in 2016.

=== Reception ===
Critical reception for Time Walker was negative. TV Guide rated it 1/5 stars and called it a clichéd mummy film notable only for the non-traditional monster, which moves quickly. David Linck for Box Office criticized the film's lighting and special effects. He also described its story as "all-too-predictable with little suspense or excitement to look forward to". Lou Cedrone for The Evening Sun declared the film as "instant camp" and should be enjoyed for its badness. Evansville Courier & Press staff writer Patrice Smith was negative towards Tom Kennedy's direction and the writing, calling the screenplay "ludicrously illiterate". Smith considered the film to be a pathetic attempt at turning mummy movies into a contemporary Close Encounters of the Third Kind. Desmond Ryan for The Philadelphia Inquirer considered the film to be a rip-off Steven Spielberg's Close Encounters of the Third Kind and E.T. the Extra-Terrestrial.

Fangoria criticized it for its slow pace, ultimately calling it a "time waster." Stuart Galbraith of DVD Talk rated it 3/5 stars and wrote, "Though mercilessly ridiculed on Mystery Science Theater 3000, Time Walker is a naively charming low-budget horror and sci-fi thriller, a real throwback to a more innocent time." Blockbuster Entertainment gave the film two stars, while Jim Craddock, author of VideoHound's Golden Movie Retriever, gave it one star. Film critic Leonard Maltin gave it a "BOMB" rating, calling it "low-budget junk."

== Mystery Science Theater 3000 ==
Under the name Being from Another Planet, this film was featured in episode #405 of Mystery Science Theater 3000. The episode debuted July 4, 1992, on Comedy Central. "The people in this movie are almost kind of attractive," MST3K writer Paul Chaplin claimed, "but then, not at all. ... The wardrobe department was good at making breasts seem really unappealing." After the movie finishes, Tom Servo declares Being from Another Planet the worst film out of all the previous bad films they have watched (until admitting The Castle of Fu Manchu was "just as bad").

The episode did not make the Top 100 list of episodes as voted upon by MST3K Season 11 Kickstarter backers. Writer Jim Vorel agreed with the fans' lack of enthusiasm, ranking it #171 out of 191 total MST3K episodes. Vorel found Being from Another Planet "a very painful film indeed; just outside the 'extreme' movie pain level."

The MST3K version of Being from Another Planet was included as part of the Mystery Science Theater 3000, Volume XXXV DVD collection, released by Shout! Factory on March 29, 2016. The other episodes in the four-disc set include Teenage Caveman (episode #315), 12 to the Moon (episode #524), and Deathstalker and the Warriors from Hell (episode #703).

== See also ==
- List of American films of 1982
