= Undertow (1996 film) =

American TV film directed by Eric Red

- Genre: Crime; Drama; Thriller
- Written by: Eric Red; Kathryn Bigelow
- Directed by: Eric Red
- Starring: Lou Diamond Phillips
- Theme music composer: John Frizzell
- Country of origin: United States
- Original language: English

Production
- Executive producers: David Perlmutter; Lewis Chesler
- Producers: Tom Kuhn; Fred Weintraub; David Baird; Rick Nathanson; Robertas Urbonas; Jackie Weintraub
- Cinematography: Geza Sinkovics
- Editor: Claudia Finkle
- Running time: 89 minutes
- Production companies: Lietuvos Kinostudija; Showtime Networks; Weintraub/Kuhn Productions

Original release
- Release: March 24, 1996

Undertow is a 1996 American crime thriller film directed by Eric Red.

== Plot ==
A man's car breaks down and he seeks shelter in a remote shack in the woods, where he is held at gunpoint by a deranged mountain man.

== Cast ==
- Lou Diamond Phillips as Jack Ketchum
- Mia Sara as Willie Yates
- Charles Dance as Lyle Yates

== Reception ==
TVGuide.com rated it 2 out of 5 stars. Carole Horst of Variety.com wrote that it "drowns in a fuzzy script and amateurish direction that fail to build tension or sympathy for the leads." It currently holds a rating of 5.2 out of 10 on IMDB.
