= Horror High =

1973 film by Larry N. Stouffer

- Theatrical release poster
- Directed by: Larry N. Stouffer
- Written by: J.D. Feigelson
- Produced by: James P. Graham; Tom Moore
- Starring: Pat Cardi; Rosie Holotik; John Niland; Austin Stoker; Joye Nash; Jeff Alexander
- Cinematography: Janis P. Valtenbergs
- Edited by: Travis Rhodes
- Music by: Don Hulette
- Production company: Jamison Film Company
- Distributed by: Crown International Pictures
- Release date: September 20, 1973
- Running time: 85 minutes (original cut); 91 minutes (TV cut)
- Country: United States
- Language: English
- Budget: $67,000

Horror High (also known as Twisted Brain and Kiss the Teacher...Goodbye!) is a 1973 American horror film directed by Larry N. Stouffer, written by J.D. Feigelson, and starring Pat Cardi, Rosie Holotik, John Niland, Austin Stoker, Joye Hash, and Jeff Alexander. The plot concerns a shy, yet exceptionally smart biology student who uses a new physically body-altering drug he has invented to wreak havoc on those at his school who have wronged him.

== Plot ==
Vernon Potts is a shy yet clever high school student who frequently experiences bullying and other cruel behaviour at the hands of the bullies and teachers at his school. Despite this, he develops a friendship with his classmate Robin Jones, much to the disapproval of her boyfriend, a high school football player named Roger Davis.

Late one night after school, Vernon sneaks into the science classroom to feed the class guinea pig Mr. Mumps, whom he has also used as a test subject for a new drug he has created as part of his biology project. However, he discovers that the drug has turned Mr. Mumps into a small, snarling beast, which has killed a cat owned by the school's creepy janitor, Mr. Griggs. Vernon tries to dispose of the cat's body, but Griggs catches him in the act, and, thinking Vernon responsible, beats him in a fit of rage, before beating Mr. Mumps to death with a pestle. After eyeing a batch of the drug used on Mr. Mumps, Griggs threatens Vernon into drinking it. Upon doing so, Vernon convulses, becomes violent, and kills Mr. Griggs by dunking him into a barrel of sulphuric acid.

Despite Vernon's efforts to dispose of the evidence, Griggs's dissolved remains are found during science class the next day. A detective, Lieutenant Bozeman, is brought in to investigate, and briefly talks with Vernon to see if he knows anything, but Vernon stays silent about the murder, and so, due to a lack of evidence, Bozeman leaves.

After an English test, Vernon is called over by his wicked English teacher, Mrs. Grindstaff, who tells him that due to his struggling performance in English in comparison to his biology efforts, he will have to attend every literature club meeting for the rest of the semester in order for him to earn a credit high enough for him to be able to graduate. Despite Vernon's protests, since the club meetings coincide with his weekly library visits, Grindstaff ultimately gets him to do so. Since the literature club is happening that night, Vernon goes, but instead spends the meeting's duration in the science classroom, as he brews another batch of the drug he used on Mr. Mumps and drinks it as the meeting comes to an end. Once everyone else has left, Vernon transforms, and after chasing and terrorizing Grindstaff, ultimately kills her by cutting off her fingers and then decapitating her with a paper guillotine.

Grindstaff's body is discovered the next morning, and Lieutenant Bozeman is once again brought in. Vernon admits to Robin that Mr. Mumps is dead and tells her that he is abandoning the biology experiment. She then offers Vernon an opportunity to work on her biology project instead, which Vernon agrees to.

During a meeting with Coach McCall in the locker room, McCall reprimands Vernon for skipping P.E. and valuing chemistry and biology more than the gym. However, he offers him an opportunity for him to be able to skip P.E. for the rest of year; since a student football player of his is struggling with chemistry and needs to pass all his subjects in order to be eligible to play football, McCall offers Vernon the opportunity to help them. Vernon agrees, but is dismayed to learn that the student is none other than his bully Roger, and that he will have to let Roger cheat the exam since it is the next day. In response, McCall tells Vernon to give him a telephone call at 10:00pm that night at the school after he has time to consider it, and tells him to keep their plan a secret.

That night, whilst waiting in the school for Vernon's response, McCall suddenly encounters Bozeman and his police squad, who quickly start to suspect him of the murders, but McCall is able to talk himself out of getting arrested. Soon after Bozeman leaves, McCall encounters Vernon, who has already consumed another batch of the drug. Vernon kills McCall by lacerating his chest with track spikes, and his screams attract the attention of Bozeman's police squad, who quickly find the body, and arrest Roger when they find him wandering around outside the building.

The next morning, Robin expresses distress over Roger's arrest, but Vernon calms her, and arranges a date with her at the park for 7:30 that night. That night, however, Vernon receives a telephone call from Roger, who tells him that the police have released him due to a lack of evidence. Roger then tells Vernon that he saw Vernon sneaking into the chemistry lab the night of his arrest, and threatens to report him unless he meets with him at the school in an hour. Vernon reluctantly agrees.

Upon arriving at the school, Vernon brews yet another batch of the drug, and drinks it, only to be scared off by the sound of someone at the classroom window. Believing it to be Roger, Vernon flees, only to run into Robin, who warns him about Roger since she thinks he plans to kill Vernon. However, Vernon then reveals that he was the murderer, and apologises to Robin, only to once again transform and chase her throughout the school. He eventually catches her, but rather than killing her, breaks down into tears. However, Bozeman and his police squad then arrive and start firing at Vernon, who flees and jumps out the window. Outside, he encounters Roger, whom he starts beating, only for the police squad to find them and shoot Vernon to death. The movie ends with Robin mourning over Vernon's body.

== Cast ==
- Pat Cardi as Vernon Potts
- Austin Stoker as Lieutenant Bozeman
- Rosie Holotik as Robin Jones
- John Niland as Coach McCall
- Joye Hash as Mrs. Grindstaff
- Jeff Alexander as Mr. Griggs
- Mike McHenry as Roger Davis
- Nick Felix as Mr. Henshaw
- Michelle Falerne as Girl Student

The police officers seen during the film's climax are also played by members of the Dallas Cowboys football team, including Billy Truax, D. D. Lewis, Craig Morton and Calvin Hill, all of whom were brought in by Niland.

== Production ==
Screenwriter J.D. Feigelson says he got the idea for the film after wondering what it would be like if the Strange Case of Dr Jekyll and Mr Hyde were set in a high school. Filming took place in Irving, Texas from April 15 to May 2, 1973.

== Release ==
Horror High was first released on September 20, 1973, in Irving, Texas, and was later given a wider release in the United States in March 1974. The film was originally rated X by the Motion Picture Association, and so, after it was sold to Crown International Pictures, the film's kill sequences were reduced to get a rating of PG. Crown International's then-president Mark Tenser also had approximately 8 minutes of additional footage be filmed to increase the runtime and compensate for the lost duration. This new footage had Tenser himself playing the role of Vernon's father, and has little association with the rest of the film. The PG version of the film, retitled Twisted Brain, was broadcast frequently for WPIX's Chiller Theatre series.

=== Home media ===
Horror High had its first DVD release in 2004 when Rhino Entertainment released it as part of the boxset Horrible Horrors Collection Vol. 1, alongside The Hearse, Prime Evil, Terror, Lurkers, Fleshburn, Satan's Slave, and Point of Terror. However, this release was sourced from a low-quality VHS transfer of the Twisted Brain television version. The R-rated version of the film was restored and released for the first time on DVD by Code Red on August 10, 2010. The film was also released as part of Mill Creek Entertainment's 200 Film Set Drive-In Cult Classics Collection. On July 26, 2022, independent home video distributor Vinegar Syndrome released the film in its original and uncut form on Blu-ray for the first time in a combo-pack with the 1972 film Stanley. This release, sourced from "the only known and fully-uncut 16mm lab print", features exclusive interviews with screenwriter Fiegelson and actors Cardi, Niland and Falerne, as well as a commentary track by Cardi.
