= Robertas Urbonas =

Lithuanian film producer (born 1960)

Robertas Urbonas (born 11 May 1960 in Klaipėda) is a Lithuanian film producer.

== Filmography ==
- Guinevere (1994)
- Under the Milky Way (1995)
- Undertow (1996)
- The New Adventures of Robin Hood (1997)
- Vilko dantu karoliai (1997)
- Die kaukasische Nacht (1998)
- The Devil's Arithmetic (1999)
- Elze's Life (2000)
- Perilous (2000)
- Attila (2001)
- Der Mann, den sie nicht lieben durfte (2001)
- Invincible (2001)
- The Hit (2001)
- Warrior Angels (2002)
- The Red Phone: Manhunt (2002)
- Benjamin Franklin (2002)
- Endangered Species (2003)
- Out of the Ashes (2003)
- Special Forces (2003)
- Dr. Jekyll and Mr. Hyde (2003)
- Insatiability (2003)
- P.O.W. (2003)
- Colette, une femme libre (2004)
- Ratten 2 - Sie kommen wieder! (2004)
- Uncle Adolf (2005)
- Nature Unleashed: Earthquake (2005)
- Wellen (2005)
- Russian Dolls: Sex Trade (2005)
- Forest of the Gods (2005)
- Silence Becomes You (2005)
- Störtebeker (2006)
- Snapphanar (2006)
- Dieviskoji sviesa (2006)
- Iskyss (2008)
- Muzh moey vdovy (2010)
- 1939 Battle of Westerplatte (2013)
