= Assault on Precinct 13 (2005 film) =

Film by Jean-François Richet

- Theatrical release poster
- Directed by: Jean-François Richet
- Screenplay by: James DeMonaco
- Based on: Assault on Precinct 13 by John Carpenter
- Produced by: Pascal Caucheteux; Stephane Sperry; Jeffrey Silver
- Starring: Ethan Hawke; Laurence Fishburne; John Leguizamo; Maria Bello; Ja Rule; Drea de Matteo; Brian Dennehy; Gabriel Byrne
- Cinematography: Robert Gantz
- Edited by: Bill Pankow
- Music by: Graeme Revell
- Production companies: Why Not Productions; Liaison Films; Biscayne Pictures
- Distributed by: Rogue Pictures (United States); Metropolitan Filmexport (France)
- Release dates: January 19, 2005 (United States); March 2, 2005 (France)
- Running time: 109 minutes
- Countries: United States; France
- Language: English
- Budget: $25–30 million
- Box office: $35.3 million

Assault on Precinct 13 is a 2005 action thriller film directed by Jean-François Richet and written by James DeMonaco. A remake of the 1976 film of the same name, it follows the staff and inmates of the eponymous Precinct 13 who are forced to team up when they become targeted by corrupt officers. It stars Ethan Hawke and Laurence Fishburne, with John Leguizamo, Maria Bello, Ja Rule, Drea de Matteo, Brian Dennehy, and Gabriel Byrne in supporting roles.

The film was released in the United States on January 19, 2005. It received mixed reviews and grossed $35.3 million on a $25–30 million budget.

== Plot ==
Following a failed sting operation in which two fellow undercover officers are killed months prior, Detroit PD's Sergeant Jake Roenick begins to regularly abuse alcohol and painkillers while clinging to his unambitious assignment as a desk sergeant at Precinct 13, which is due to be decommissioned. On New Year's Eve, Roenick, Officer Jasper O'Shea who is set to retire, and secretary Iris Ferry maintain a skeleton shift. Psychiatrist Alexandra Sabian arrives to evaluate Roenick's fitness for duty.

Crime boss Marion Bishop is arrested after killing an undercover policeman and is set to be transferred to prison with three other criminals: Beck, Anna, and Smiley. When a snowstorm shuts down the roads, the prison transport is diverted to Precinct 13, where an unprepared Roenick places the prisoners in cells.

Masked gunmen cut off the precinct's communications and electricity, and attack the station, killing the deputies before demanding that Bishop be handed over. Roenick kills one of the attackers and finds he is an undercover cop working under Captain Marcus Duvall of the 21st Precinct. Bishop explains that Duvall and his team are corrupt and were formerly his business partners. They now plan to eliminate him to preserve their secret.

The precinct staff and criminals form an uneasy truce. O'Shea, however, urges Roenick to turn Bishop over to Duvall as he despises cop killers. Heavily outnumbered and outgunned, Roenick releases the prisoners and arms them to help defend the precinct. Their combined efforts repel several more attacks, eventually leading to a stalemate. Another officer, Capra, arrives and is shot at by the corrupt officers, but makes it inside, but Bishop suspects him of being sent by Duvall when he discovers an unlocked back entrance.

Beck and Smiley meanwhile secretly conspire to escape; simultaneously, the rest of the defenders plan for Anna and Sabian to escape in Capra's SUV. When Beck and Smiley sneak out, they are killed by Duvall's snipers, providing the distraction which allows Anna and Sabian to drive off but they are ambushed by Duvall's right-hand man Kahane; who kills Anna, having been hiding in the back seat, whilst Duvall kills Sabian after she refuses to cooperate.

When the snowfall subsides, Duvall calls in a corrupt SWAT team who land on the roof of the precinct. The defenders flee through a utility tunnel underneath the building. Emerging from the tunnel, Bishop takes Iris at gunpoint to cover his escape, only for him and the others to find themselves surrounded by Duvall's men. The traitor is revealed to be O'Shea and not Capra. As Duvall prepares to kill the others, Bishop secretly plants a flash-bang grenade on O'Shea, mortally wounding him. In the confusion, Iris and Capra flee in Duvall's SUV. Kahane shoots out the tires, causing the vehicle to crash and knock Capra unconscious, but Iris manages to kill Kahane after a struggle.

Duvall chases Roenick and Bishop into a nearby forest where they ambush and kill the remaining forces, however, Duvall shoots and wounds Bishop before being killed by Roenick, who is himself injured in the process. Following this, an injured Bishop takes Roenick's gun and flees, and Roenick promises to personally arrest him in the future. When Iris arrives with police and firemen, Roenick claims that only he and Duvall's gang are present, knowing that Bishop can't go too far but wanting to give him the illusion of liberty. As the authorities secure the area, Roenick and Iris leave the forest as the sun rises.

== Cast ==
- Ethan Hawke as Sergeant Jake Roenick, a former narcotics detective who took a position to run Precinct 13
- Laurence Fishburne as Marion Bishop, a gangster and cop killer who was apprehended and brought to Precinct 13
- John Leguizamo as Beck, a criminal brought to Precinct 13
- Maria Bello as Dr. Alex Sabian, Roenick's psychiatrist
- Jeffrey "Ja Rule" Atkins as Smiley, a criminal brought to Precinct 13
- Drea de Matteo as Iris Ferry, the secretary at Precinct 13
- Matt Craven as Officer Kevin Capra, a police officer assigned to Precinct 13
- Brian Dennehy as Officer Jasper O'Shea, an aging officer at Precinct 13 who is set to retire
- Gabriel Byrne as Captain Marcus Duvall, the corrupt ranking officer from Precinct 21 determined to silence Bishop
- Kim Coates as Deputy Rosen, a Wayne County deputy who helped load off prisoners at Precinct 13
- Dorian Harewood as Deputy Gil, a Wayne County deputy who helped load off prisoners at Precinct 13
- Currie Graham as Lieutenant Mike Kahane, a corrupt ranking officer working directly under Duvall
- Fulvio Cecere as Officer Ray Portnell
- Titus Welliver as Milos
- Hugh Dillon as Tony
- Aisha Hinds as Anna, a criminal brought to Precinct 13 who denies any wrongdoing

== Production ==
Attempts at a remake of Assault on Precinct 13 were documented as far back as 2001. In June 2003, it was announced Focus Features would be teaming with Why Not Productions and Liaison Films to produce a remake of the 1976 film Assault on Precinct 13 to be written by James DeMonaco that would be set in contemporary times. In March 2004, it was reported that Focus would be releasing the film through the revived Rogue Pictures label specializing in commercial genre films. When Ethan Hawke joined the film, he was under the impression that Wes Craven had directed the original.

John Carpenter was not supportive of the remake, taking no participation in it, and is quoted as saying:

Isn't that a weird idea? Strange gig. I don't know. I should take it as flattery I guess but it only reconfirms what I've said all along – Hollywood has no new ideas left!

Assault on Precinct 13 was mostly filmed on location in Detroit, as well as in Ontario, Canada (Toronto and Hamilton).

== Reception ==
=== Box office ===
Assault on Precinct 13 grossed $35.3 million worldwide on a budget of $30 million. Upon release on home video, the film sold through two million copies on its first week of release.

=== Critical response ===
On Rotten Tomatoes, it has a 59% rating based on reviews from 162 critics. The site's critical consensus being "This remake has been praised by some as an expertly made B-movie, and dismissed by others as formulaic". On Metacritic it has a score of 54 out of 100, based on reviews from 39 critics, indicating "mixed or average" reviews. Audiences polled by CinemaScore gave the film an average grade of "B" on an A+ to F scale.

== See also ==
- List of American films of 2005
- List of films set around New Year
