= Tom Kennedy (producer) =

American filmmaker and author

- Born: 1948
- Died: December 7, 2011 (aged 62-63); West Hills, California, U.S.

Tom Kennedy (c. 1948 – December 7, 2011) was an American film trailer producer, film director, voice-over artist, author, writer and film editor.

Kennedy was raised in the Bronx, New York City, and graduated from the School of Visual Arts in Manhattan, where he studied film.

Kennedy worked as an editor for the PBS children's show, Big Blue Marble, during his early career. In 1977, he moved from New York City to Los Angeles. He soon became a project director, editor and writer for became the Kaleidoscope Films, one of Hollywood's major creators of film trailers. Kennedy oversaw the audiovisual creative advertising for the clients of Kaleidoscope Film and worked on the advertising campaigns for numerous films during the late 1970s, 1980s and 1990s. His portfolio at Kaleidoscope included The Empire Strikes Back, Return of the Jedi, Indiana Jones and the Temple of Doom, Indiana Jones and the Last Crusade, The Terminator, The Year of Living Dangerously, Star Trek: The Motion Picture, Star Trek II: The Wrath of Khan, Star Trek III: The Search for Spock and Star Trek IV: The Voyage Home.

Kennedy directed one feature film, Time Walker, a low budget movie released in 1982 by New World Entertainment, which was owned by Roger Corman.

Kennedy left Kaleidoscope in 1992 and joined Cimarron/Bacon/O'Brien that same year as a partner and executive producer in the firm. Kennedy oversaw the audiovisual advertising and film trailer campaigns at Cimarron/Bacon/O'Brien for the 1990s major studio films Basic Instinct, Home Alone, Home Alone 2, Unforgiven, The Mask, Get Shorty, True Lies and Broken Arrow.

Kennedy became the senior Vice President of creative advertising at MGM/UA in 1997. He oversaw the James Bond film franchise, beginning with Tomorrow Never Dies in 1997. He further established his own production studio, Technical Knock Out Pictures, in 2000.

Additionally, Kennedy performed voice over work for numerous film trailers and promos for television networks, including Showtime and ABC.

Tom Kennedy died in West Hills, California, on December 7, 2011, at the age of 63. He was survived by his three children: Jesse Kennedy, a film producer; Shane Kennedy, a musician; and Samantha Kennedy, an actress; and three grandchildren.
