= Darwin Joston =

American actor (1937–1998)

- Joston in Assault on Precinct 13, c. 1976
- Born: Francis Darwin Solomon; December 9, 1937; Winston-Salem, North Carolina, U.S.
- Died: June 1, 1998 (aged 60); Winston-Salem, North Carolina, U.S.
- Other name: Darwin Jostin
- Occupation: Actor
- Years active: 1960–1986
- Spouses: Josephine Cook (ex-wife at time of death); Janie Posey Swaim (fiancée at time of death)

Francis Darwin Solomon (December 9, 1937 – June 1, 1998) was an American actor known professionally as Darwin Joston (sometimes credited as Darwin Jostin during the early years of his career). Joston began his career as a New York stage actor, and he appeared in many popular television shows during the 1960s, early 1970s, and mid-1980s, but he is best known for his performances in independent films that later achieved cult status, particularly Assault on Precinct 13.

== Early life ==
Joston was born in Winston-Salem, North Carolina, to US Navy veteran (Beauford) Odell Solomon (1914-2006), owner of the Odell Solomon Lawn and Garden Center, and (Mary) Elizabeth (known as "Lib"; 1912-2007), daughter of John Smith, of Kernersville, North Carolina. Joston had one brother, Talmadge Solomon, who became a Church of Christ minister. Joston attended Robert B. Glenn High School in Kernersville, where he was considered to be a talented athlete. He later studied drama at the University of North Carolina at Chapel Hill and graduated from there in 1960.

== Career ==
After college, Joston moved to New York City and began his professional career as a stage actor in various theater and summer stock productions. He lived and worked in New York for five years and then moved to Los Angeles, California, where, from the mid-1960s through the mid-1970s, Joston acted primarily in television. He appeared in a number of popular series including Lassie (in which he had a recurring role), The Virginian, The Rat Patrol, Ironside, The Rookies, and McCloud. He also had guest roles in episodes of the short-lived series Longstreet and Ghost Story/Circle of Fear.

Joston also acted in genre films during this phase of his acting career. Of the two films that were released theatrically, the first was the 1971 western-themed, grindhouse exploitation film, Cain's Cutthroats, in which he played Billy-Joe, a psychopathic, mother-obsessed, sexually warped Confederate soldier. The second film was the low-budget 1976 horror movie, Rattlers, in which he played a soldier who is killed by a horde of rattlesnakes.

=== Assault on Precinct 13 ===
Joston is known for his iconic portrayal of Napoleon Wilson, the sardonic, shotgun-toting, anti-hero in Assault on Precinct 13, John Carpenter's 1976, Howard Hawks-inspired, action film. Carpenter has said that he wrote the Napoleon Wilson role with Joston in mind and imbued the character with some of Joston's personality traits. When Carpenter was writing the screenplay for Assault on Precinct 13, he and Joston both lived in the same Hollywood Hills apartment building and became friends. Having gotten to know Joston and his dark sense of humor, Carpenter felt that his neighbor would make an interesting anti-hero.

This was Joston's largest role, and it is considered to have been his best. Joston's singular performance not only conveys Wilson's stoic toughness, but also emphasizes his irreverent, ironic sense of humor and slowly reveals the character's unexpected capacities for loyalty and tenderness, thereby adding emotional depth and humanity to what otherwise could have been a stereotypical action-hero role. Moreover, Joston's performance has been repeatedly singled out as the film's best and is often cited as one of the primary reasons for Assault on Precinct 13's continued audience appeal.

=== Eraserhead, The Fog, Gunmen's Blues ===
During the five years following the release of Assault on Precinct 13, Joston appeared in three more independent films. He played Paul, the beleaguered pencil-factory clerk, in David Lynch's classic 1977 cult film, Eraserhead. According to Joston, Lynch wanted to cast him in the part after seeing one of his previous performances (though Joston did not know which one), and he contacted Joston about playing the role through a mutual friend. He worked with Carpenter again in the 1980 horror film The Fog, playing the coroner, Dr. Phibes. Shortly afterward, Eric Red, then a young filmmaker and a fan of Joston's performance in Assault on Precinct 13, cast Joston in the lead role of the world-weary hitman in Red's 1981 short film, Gunmen's Blues.

Joston also worked on the transportation crews of two 1978 movies, The Buddy Holly Story and Ruby and Oswald.

=== Later career ===
In the 1980s, Joston's acting career became more sporadic, and he made a gradual transition from acting to working full-time as a teamster on film and television transportation crews. He had begun working as a teamster when he was between acting jobs, which, according to Joston, was much of the time; eventually, he became so busy working on film crews that he rarely had time to look for roles. After 1986, he worked primarily in transportation until his retirement in 1994.

In 1982, when Carpenter was scheduled to direct the film adaptation of Stephen King's novel Firestarter, Joston was considered for the role of John Rainbird, the Native-American assassin; but after Universal Pictures executives fired Carpenter from the project (following the commercial failure of The Thing) and replaced him with Mark L. Lester, the role of Rainbird was given to George C. Scott.

Joston's last film role was in the 1982 B-movie (and Mystery Science Theater 3000 favorite) Time Walker (also known as Being from Another Planet), in which he appeared with his Assault on Precinct 13 co-star, Austin Stoker; and the last two years of his acting career were spent playing guest roles in television series such as Hill Street Blues, Spenser: For Hire, Knight Rider, and Remington Steele. He also performed as a voice actor in Showtime's short-lived, 1985 animated series Washingtoon. His final television role was in a 1986 episode of the comedy series ALF.

From 1986 until 1994, he worked as a driver, driver captain, or transportation captain (sometimes with his son, Shawn Solomon) on various television productions and on films such as Down and Out in Beverly Hills (1986), La Bamba (1987), Lynch's 1990 film Wild at Heart, and The American President (1995).

== Death ==
After Joston retired, he moved from Los Angeles back to Winston-Salem. Several years later, on June 1, 1998, he died of leukemia at Forsyth Medical Center. His funeral was held on June 4, 1998, at the Oaklawn Baptist Church in Winston-Salem; the services were conducted by his brother, Talmadge, and by Rev. Paul Riggs.

== Legacy ==
Within several months of his death, Joston's friends and family established the F. Darwin Solomon Endowment at the University of North Carolina School of the Arts (then known as the North Carolina School of the Arts) in Winston-Salem to commemorate his life and career.

Some, including director Quentin Tarantino, consider Joston to have been a vastly underrated actor whose talent was not duly recognized during his lifetime.

== Filmography ==
Year	Title	Role	Notes
1970	Cain's Cutthroats	Billy Joe	
1976	Rattlers	Palmer	
1976	Assault on Precinct 13	Napoleon Wilson	
1977	Eraserhead	Paul	
1980	The Fog	Dr. Phibes	
1980	Coast to Coast	Drunken Trucker #2	
1982	Time Walker	Lt. Plummer	
