= Charlotte Szlovak =

Moroccan-born French filmmaker (born 1947)

- Born: 1947; Oudja, Morocco
- Occupation: Filmmaker
- Years active: 1974–present
- Notable work: Retour à Oujda; Do You Remember Laurie Zimmer?

Charlotte Szlovak is a Hungarian-French filmmaker.

== Biography ==
Szlovak was born in 1947. Her family emigrated from Hungary to Oudja before World War II.

== Career ==
Szlovak began her film career as the cinematographer of Chantal Akerman's 1974 experimental film Je, tu, il, elle ("I, you, he, she"), but she is now best known as the writer and director of independent documentary films.

Many of Szlovak's films focus upon aspects of her past and address larger issues through the lens of her personal experiences. Her 2003 documentary, Do You Remember Laurie Zimmer?, is an examination of nostalgia and loss manifested in Szlovak's search to find her long-lost friend, the American actress Laurie Zimmer.

She is known for her films about interconnections between Jewish and Muslim communities in Morocco. Among these are Docteur Imre Szlovak ("Doctor Imre Szlovak"), a 1995 film about Szlovak's Hungarian father and his life as a Jewish immigrant in Morocco, and Retour à Oujda ("Return to Oujda"), a 1987 film in which she explores the close ties between Jews and Muslims in Oudja, the town where she grew up.
