= Une sale histoire =

- Directed by: Jean Eustache
- Starring: Françoise Lebrun
- Release date: 1977
- Country: France
- Language: French

Une sale histoire (also known as A Dirty Story) is an unusual short 1977 French film of two halves, or two related short films tagged on to each other, by French director Jean Eustache.

It concerns the factual tale of a man who finds a peep hole in the female toilets of a café - the story firstly being acted out and secondly being conveyed off-the-cuff by the man this actually happened to. Luc Béraud is assistant director on the movie.

The film stars Michael Lonsdale, Laurie Zimmer (credited as Laura Fanning) and Françoise Lebrun. In the second half, presented as a document whereas the first part is a fiction, the main role is played by Jean-Noël Picq.

== See also ==
- Voyeurism
