= Vivian Bonnell =

American actress

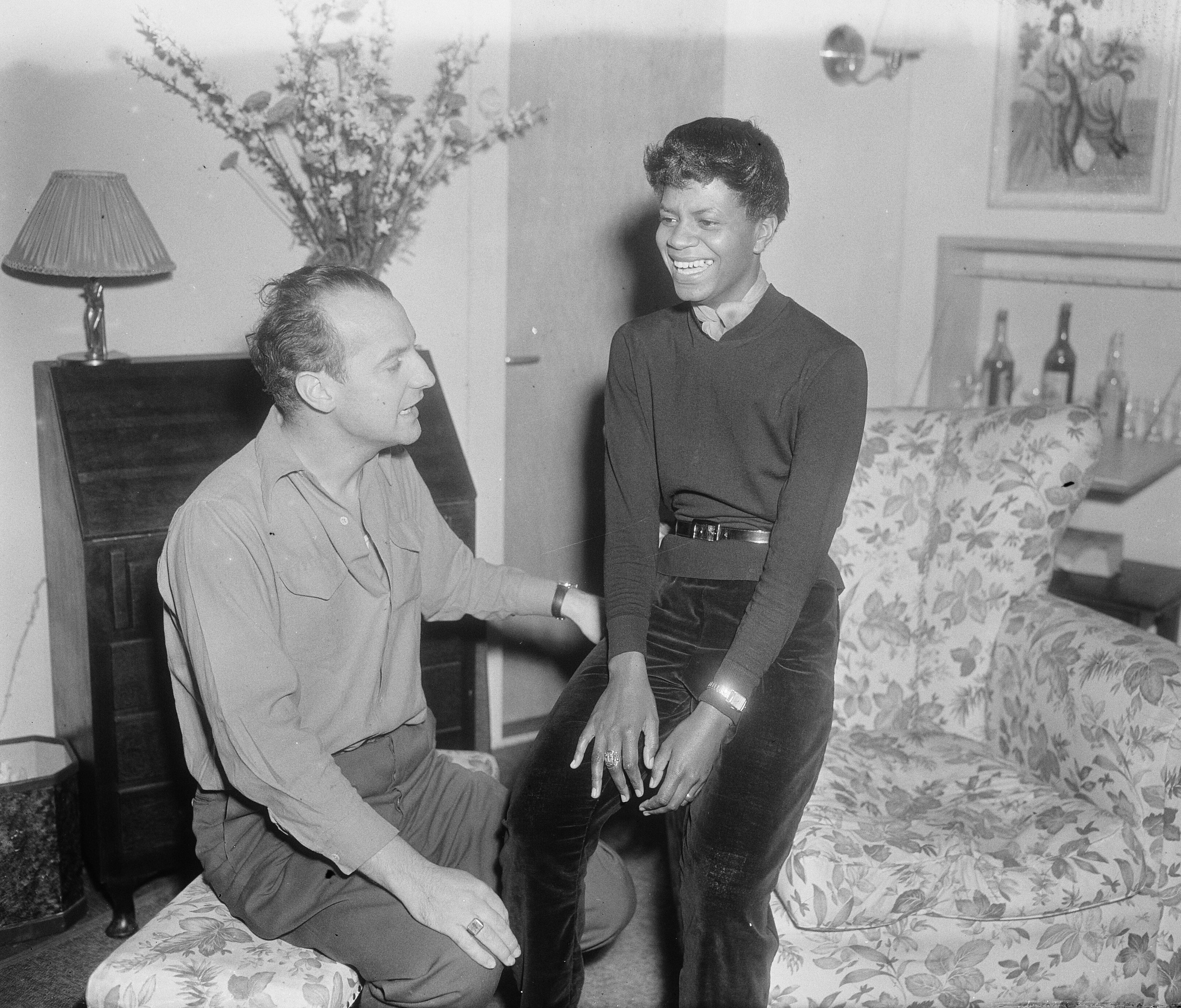
- Wim Sonneveld (left) with Enid Mosier (right)
- Born: Enid Mosier; May 23, 1924; Antigua, British West Indies
- Died: November 18, 2003 (aged 79); Los Angeles, California, U.S.
- Occupations: Actress, singer
- Spouse(s): Austin Stoker (m. 1959–200?)

Vivian Bonnell (born Enid Mosier, May 23, 1924 – November 18, 2003) was an actress and calypso singer, originally from Antigua, British West Indies. In 1954, she starred opposite Pearl Bailey in the Broadway musical House of Flowers. She and her fellow cast members recorded calypso albums as "Enid Mosier and her Trinidad Steel Band". She later married one of those performers, Austin Stoker.

After changing her name, Bonnell went on to appear in a number of films and television shows, including several American TV movies. She died of complications from diabetes in Los Angeles on November 18, 2003, at the age of 79.

== Filmography ==
=== Film ===
Year	Title	Role	Notes
1952	Lady Possessed	Calypso Singer	as Enid Mosier
1974	For Pete's Sake	Loretta	
1976	Leadbelly	Old Lady	
1979	California Dreaming	Alma	
1984	Teachers	Nurse	
1987	Summer School	Mrs. Green	
1987	Amazon Women on the Moon	Theatre Customer #3	(segment "Peter Pan Theatre" [TV cut & DVD only]), Uncredited
1990	Ghost	Ortisha	

=== Television ===
Year	Title	Role	Notes
1968	The Carol Burnett Show	Sketch performer	Uncredited
1972	The Sandy Duncan Show	Louise	Episode: Richer Third
1973	The Odd Couple	Ms. Ferret	Episode: The Ides of April
1973	Sanford and Son	Audrey	Episode: Libra Rising All Over Lamont
1974	Emergency!	Cealia	Episode: Floor Brigade
1974	Sanford and Son	Betty Hester	Episode: Will the Real Fred Sanford Please Do Something?
1975	Police Woman	Myrtle Washington	Episode: The Chasers
1975	Happy Days	Rosemary	Episode: Fonzie's New Friend
1975	Good Times	Cora	Episode: The Baby
1976	Good Times	Clara	Episode: Michael the Warlord
1981	Sanford	Older Nurse	Episode: Fred Has the Big One
1981	The Jeffersons	Mrs. Mills	Episode: And the Doorknobs Shined Like Diamonds
1982	Dallas		Episode: Adoption
1982	St. Elsewhere	Nurse Skilling	Three episodes
1985	Hunter	Witness	Episode: Fire Man
1985	The Twilight Zone	Black Woman	Episode: Healer/Children's Zoo/Kentucky Rye (segment "Healer")
1985	Moonlighting	Woman at Window	Episode: Somewhere Under the Rainbow
1986	Hill Street Blues	Fannie Robinson	Episode: Slum Enchanted Evening
1987	Amen	Martha, Reuben's Aunt	Episode: Into the Night
1987	Highway to Heaven	Louise	Episode: The People Next Door
1989	The Women of Brewster Place	Black Woman	Two episodes
1989	Life Goes On	Mrs. Warner	Episode: Pets, Guys and Videotape
1990	Daughter of the Streets	Mary	TV movie
1990	Dragnet		Episode: Trespass
1991	The Josephine Baker Story	Josephine's Mother	TV movie
1991	Switched at Birth	Nurse Ford	TV movie
1992	In the Arms of a Killer	Mavis	TV movie
1992	Christmas in Connecticut	Norah	TV movie (remake)
1996	Married... with Children	Mourner #3	Episode: A Bundy Thanksgiving
1996	Moesha	Mrs. Smith	Episode: Road Trip, (final appearance)
