= Art Fleming =

American actor and television host (1924–1995)

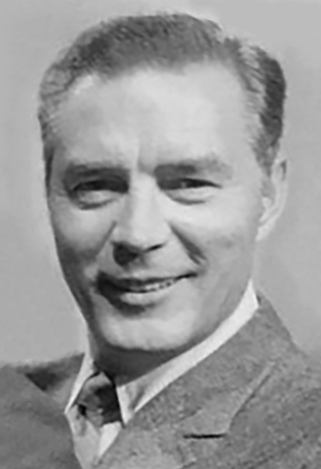
- Fleming in 1970
- Born: Arthur Volk Fazzini; May 1, 1924; New York City, U.S.
- Died: April 25, 1995 (aged 70); Crystal River, Florida, U.S.
- Occupations: Television host; radio host; actor
- Years active: 1949–1992
- Known for: Original host of Jeopardy! (1964-1975; 1978-1979)
- Spouses: Mildred Goodrich (m. 1946; div. 1954) Peggy Ann Ellis (m. 1954; div. 1972); Becky Weaver (m. 1977)

Art Fleming (born Arthur Volk Fazzini; May 1, 1924 – April 25, 1995) was an American actor and television host. He was the original host of the television game show Jeopardy!, hosting its first three versions as a network show on NBC (1964-1975 and 1978-1979) and as a weekly syndicated show (1974-1975).

== Early life and career ==
Fleming was born Arthur Volk Fazzini in New York City. His parents, William and Marie Fazzini, who led a dance team popular in Europe, had immigrated to the United States from Austria. Fleming played varsity football at James Monroe High School in New York, where he earned a letterman award. He stood 6 feet 4 inches (1.93 m) and weighed 220 pounds (100 kg). He later attended Colgate University and Cornell University, playing on the football and water polo teams at both colleges. Fleming served in the U.S. Navy for three and a half years during World War II as a patrol bomber pilot over the Atlantic.

After leaving the Navy, Fleming became an announcer at a radio station in Rocky Mount, North Carolina. When he started his radio career, he also changed his surname from Fazzini to Fleming. His radio career later took him to Akron, Ohio and back home to New York. Fleming was the first announcer to deliver the slogan "Winston tastes good like a cigarette should" for Winston cigarettes.

Fleming's first television role was as a stunt double for Ralph Bellamy in the detective series Man Against Crime. In 1959, he starred as detective Ken Franklin in the ABC series International Detective, credited as Arthur Fleming. He also played attorney Jeremy Pitt in The Californians, an NBC Western set in San Francisco during the gold rush of the 1850s. Fleming also appeared in many television commercials in addition to anchoring the 11:00 news on WNBC.

== Jeopardy! ==
In 1964, Fleming was living in New York City when he was contacted by Merv Griffin regarding his availability to host a daytime game show. Griffin and his wife Julann had spotted Fleming on a commercial for Trans World Airlines, and Griffin thought that Fleming was "authoritative, yet warm and interesting". Fleming auditioned, competing against two other candidates, and was selected by Griffin, his associates, and NBC executives.

Jeopardy! was filmed at the NBC Studios at 30 Rockefeller Center in New York and began its original run on March 30, 1964 at 11:30 a.m., with Fleming as host and Don Pardo as the announcer. The show was a success from the start, appealing to working people and college students on their lunch break. In 1965, the show was moved to noon Eastern Time, which proved to be its most popular time slot. Because of the show's success, Fleming was nominated for the Daytime Emmy Award for Outstanding Game Show Host at the 1st Daytime Emmy Awards in 1974. During his tenure as host of Jeopardy!, Fleming never missed a taping.

Because he hosted a quiz show, and in part because he was an avid reader with multiple college degrees, Fleming earned a reputation as a storehouse of trivia. However, in 1990, Fleming admitted: "If I didn't have that sheet in front of me you wouldn't find me in the studio".

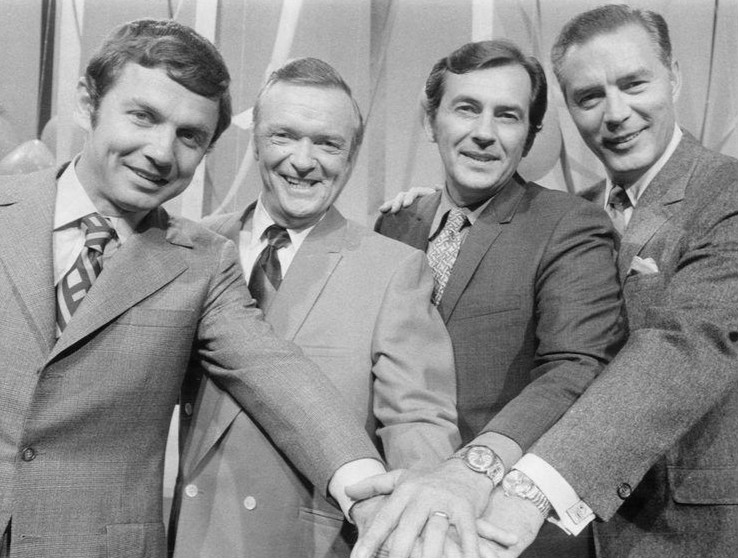
A 1970 NBC publicity photo featuring Art James, Bob Clayton, Jack Kelly and Fleming

Jeopardy! was successful until 1974 when Lin Bolen, NBC's vice president of daytime programming, canceled the show. Bolen believed that the show had run its course and that Fleming was too old to attract younger viewers. In January 1974, the show was moved to 10:30 a.m. and it lost most of its core audience, although it continued to beat its competition. In July, the show was moved to 1:30 p.m. The original Jeopardy! aired its 2,753rd and final show on January 3rd, 1975.

In an effort to keep the show alive at the end of its NBC run, Griffin unsuccessfully attempted a weekly syndicated version of Jeopardy! with Fleming as host. The syndicated program aired 39 shows between late 1974 and early 1975 but was not renewed. In 1978, Jeopardy! was revived as a network show on NBC, filming at the NBC Studios in Burbank, California. Although Fleming returned as host, format changes and difficulty with time slots meant that the show could not find an audience, and it was canceled after 108 shows.

== Later career ==
At the conclusion of Fleming's tenure as host of Jeopardy!, he had hosted about 2,900 shows. After Jeopardy!'s cancellation in both 1975 and 1979, Fleming returned to acting. In 1977, he played the role of Harry Truman's Secretary of Commerce W. Averell Harriman in the film MacArthur and appeared in the comedy film Prime Time (a.k.a. American Raspberry). He also appeared in an episode of the television police drama Starsky and Hutch as well as episodes of shows such as Kingston: Confidential and the 1976 miniseries The Moneychangers.

Fleming also hosted a radio version of College Bowl for CBS Radio from 1979 to 1982. The championships of this series also aired on television on KATU in Portland, Oregon. He hosted the NBC radio weekend magazine Monitor during 1972. Fleming reprised his role as host of Jeopardy! in the 1982 film Airplane II: The Sequel and "Weird Al" Yankovic's music video "I Lost on Jeopardy". Fleming was also often asked to host mock versions of Jeopardy! at trade shows and conventions.

When Merv Griffin began developing a new revival of Jeopardy! in 1983, he opted not to invite Fleming to host. Alex Trebek was offered the position, when suggested by actress Lucille Ball, and hosted the program until his death in 2020. However, Fleming claimed in interviews that he had declined the position.

In interviews conducted in the early years of the Trebek version, Fleming expressed his displeasure with the show's new direction and various changes that the revival's producers had implemented. He disapproved of moving production from New York to Los Angeles, suggesting that filming in California made the show feel superficial and anti-intellectual. He also claimed that the new show's questions and answers were too easy and feuded publicly with the staff of the modern Jeopardy! over the nature of the material, as he believed that the writers were inserting hints to allow the correct questions to seem more obvious and easier to guess. Despite his disagreements, Fleming believed that the modern version was one of the better shows on television.

From 1980 until his retirement in 1992, Fleming hosted a daily radio talk show on St. Louis radio station KMOX. He had been recommended to the station by Bob Costas. On Sunday evenings, he occasionally cohosted Trivia Spectacular with David Strauss, a St. Louis schoolteacher. He also hosted the syndicated radio program When Radio Was from 1990 until shortly before his death. Fleming's final game-show hosting assignment occurred during two installments of the PBS science program Nova as part of the National Science Test, in which a studio audience tested their knowledge of science against that of a celebrity panel.

== Personal life ==
Fleming was a devout Christian. He served as a deacon at Marble Collegiate Church in New York City and was a friend of Norman Vincent Peale and Robert Schuller.

Fleming married Mildred Goodrich in 1946 in North Carolina, and they had a daughter, Jan. In 1954, he married actress Peggy Ann Ellis, who had worked on The Merv Griffin Show. Fleming denied having any children in a 1974 interview, conducted after his divorce from Ellis. Despite insisting he would never marry again after his divorce from Ellis, Fleming married Becky Lynn in a private ceremony at Peale's home. He adopted Becky's two children from a prior marriage, and together they had five grandchildren.

In 1992, Fleming retired and the family moved to Crystal River, Florida. He remained active in charity work, hosting fundraising videos for the Citrus County United Way and becoming involved with the Citrus County Abuse Shelter Association. He also hosted the syndicated television program Senior America, which showcased seniors and senior activities.

== Death ==
Fleming died of pancreatic cancer on April 25, 1995 at age 70 at his home in Florida. According to his obituary in the Los Angeles Times, he had been diagnosed with cancer two weeks before his death. He was cremated and his ashes were scattered at sea. On November 8, 2020, his successor on Jeopardy!, Alex Trebek, died of the same disease at the age of 80.

== Legacy ==
As Jeopardy!'s original host, the show is perhaps Fleming's most-remembered accomplishment. He was considered by many as the face of the show even after Alex Trebek took over as host. An article from The Washington Post written on the day of Fleming's death in 1995 asked: "Who will always be the embodiment of 'Jeopardy!' even if Alex Trebek plays the role for another 40 years?"

== Filmography ==
Year	Title	Role	Notes
1957	A Hatful of Rain	Jack - Mounted Cop	
1959	Career	Mounted Policeman	Uncredited
1959	International Detective	Ken Franklin	
1964-1975; 1978-1979	Jeopardy!	Host	
1977	Prime Time a.k.a. American Raspberry	Colonel Grant	
1977	MacArthur	W. Averell Harriman	
1977	Kingston: Confidential	Ted Corbin	
1977	The Moneychangers	Prosecutor	
1977	Starsky and Hutch	Lt. John Blaine	
1982	Airplane II: The Sequel	Himself	
1984; 1985	Nova	Host	National Science Test

== See also ==
- Jeopardy!
- Broadcast of Jeopardy!
