= John Frizzell (composer) =

American composer

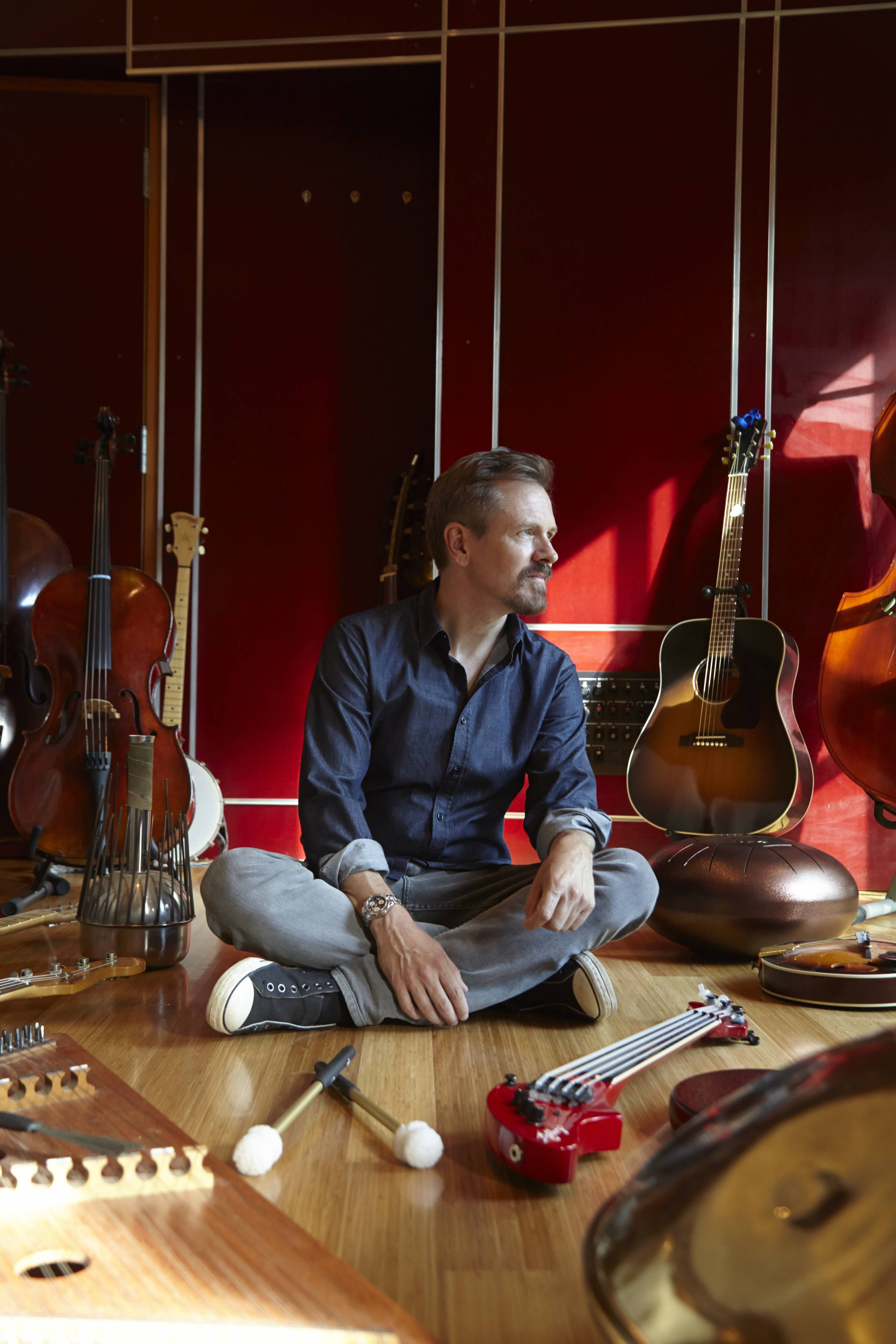
- Born: 1966 (age 59–60); New York City, U.S.
- Occupation: Composer
- Years active: 1994–present

John Frizzell (born 1966) is an American film and television composer, known for his work with Mike Judge. He scored Judge's films Beavis and Butt-Head Do America, Office Space, and Beavis and Butt-Head Do the Universe (2022). He also composed the music for Mike Judge's television sitcom King of the Hill. Frizzell has composed the film scores for over sixty films, over the course of his over three-decade-long career.

== Personal life ==
Frizzell sits on the board of directors of controversial autism-focused nonprofit Autism Speaks. As of October 2026, he was one of three openly autistic board members (out of 27 board members total). He was formally diagnosed in 2021. Frizzell co-founded Spectrum Bluegrass, a bluegrass band that hosts inclusive meetups for autistic people; the band performed at Autism Speaks' 2025 "Light Up the Blues" benefit concert.

== Film scores ==
=== 1995 ===
- Whose Daughter Is She?
- It Was Him or Us

=== 1996 ===
- Deadly Pursuits
- Undertow
- Red Ribbon Blues
- Beavis and Butt-Head Do America
- The Rich Man's Wife
- Crime of the Century
- The Empty Mirror

=== 1997 ===
- Opposite Corners
- Dante's Peak
- Alien Resurrection

=== 1998 ===
- Mafia! (as Gianni Frizzelli)
- I Still Know What You Did Last Summer

=== 1999 ===
- Office Space
- Teaching Mrs. Tingle
- The White River Kid

=== 2000 ===
- Beautiful
- Lockdown
- Possessed

=== 2001 ===
- Josie and the Pussycats
- James Dean
- Thirteen Ghosts

=== 2002 ===
- Slap Shot 2: Breaking the Ice
- Ghost Ship

=== 2003 ===
- Gods and Generals
- Cradle 2 the Grave
- Whizzard of Ow

=== 2004 ===
- The Goodbye Girl
- Karroll's Christmas

=== 2005 ===
- The Prize Winner of Defiance, Ohio
- Four Minutes
- Wal-Mart: The High Cost of Low Price

=== 2006 ===
- A Little Thing Called Murder
- Stay Alive
- The Woods

=== 2007 ===
- Careless
- Primeval
- First Born
- The Reaping
- Black Irish
- Masters of Science Fiction
- Beneath

=== 2008 ===
- Henry Poole Is Here
- Wisegal
- 100 Feet
- Tenure

=== 2009 ===
- Evil Angel
- The Lodger
- From Mexico with Love
- Whiteout

=== 2010 ===
- Legion
- Shelter

=== 2011 ===
- The Roommate

=== 2013 ===
- Texas Chainsaw 3D

=== 2014 ===
- The Loft

=== 2016 ===
- When the Bough Breaks

=== 2017 ===
- Leatherface

=== 2018 ===
- The Possession of Hannah Grace

=== 2020 ===
- Zappa
- Space Force

=== 2022 ===
- Beavis and Butt-Head Do the Universe
