= 100 Feet =

- Theatrical release poster
- Directed by: Eric Red
- Written by: Eric Red
- Produced by: Sarah Black; Ed Elbert; Jonathan Sanger
- Starring: Famke Janssen; Bobby Cannavale; Ed Westwick; Michael Paré
- Cinematography: Ken Kelsch
- Edited by: Anthony Redman
- Music by: John Frizzell
- Distributed by: Voltage Pictures; The Asylum
- Release date: August 14, 2008 (Hamburg Fantasy Filmfest)
- Running time: 105 minutes
- Country: United States
- Language: English

100 Feet is a 2008 American horror film written and directed by Eric Red and starring Famke Janssen, Bobby Cannavale, Ed Westwick and Michael Paré.

== Plot ==
Marnie Watson (Famke Janssen) is being driven home in a police car after killing her abusive husband in self-defense - to be placed under house arrest. She is escorted home by Lou Shanks (Bobby Cannavale), a police officer and former partner of her husband. After they get inside, another officer arrives to fit Marnie's ankle bracelet, telling her she cannot move more than 100 feet (30 m) from the detector in the hallway, and if the alarm sounds for more than three minutes, the police will be notified.

The next day a delivery boy Joey (Ed Westwick) arrives with groceries, and Marnie tells him she needs him to come by on a regular basis. Later that night while in bed her husband's face suddenly appears. Frightened, she leaps up and flees from the room. Her husband's ghost, Mike (Michael Paré), pushes her down the stairs. Marnie crawls to the front door setting off the detector. Shanks arrives a short time later and finds her unconscious at the front door. She tells him she fell down the stairs. He asks her if someone is beating her and chastises her for not cleaning up the blood stain which has reappeared on the wall.

Marnie has Joey get her some books from the library about ghosts. She reads that she must get rid of all of Mike's things and begins collecting everything, including the suitcase she threw in the basement. While in the basement, Marnie is attacked by Mike's ghost and dragged down the stairs before she can finally get up and run to safety. Once upstairs, Shanks is knocking at her door after hearing screams and begins looking throughout the house demanding answers. He claims that Marnie is covering for the real murderer and gets upset at her lack of clarity. In the end, he apologizes for not being able to protect her and vows to do everything in his power to protect her now.

Mike's ghost continues to threaten Marnie and she continues to rid the house of his presence. Feeling lonely, Marnie calls Joey in the night, and against her wishes, he runs over and refuses to leave unless she lets him in. They make their way upstairs and have sex, during which Marnie sees Mike's ghost and continues, seeming unfazed, almost happy that the ghost is watching. Everything seems fine until the next morning when they are getting out of bed and Mike's ghost attacks them, brutally killing Joey.

Shanks has been watching her all night and comes with a warrant to arrest Joey, claiming he knows he's in there. Marnie says she is taking a shower to buy herself some time to hide the body in the floorboards before Shanks can reach her room. While downstairs talking, the ceiling breaks above them and Joey's body falls through the ceiling. Shanks gets ready to arrest Marnie and takes her from the house when Mike's ghost attacks Marnie, throwing her about the room. Stunned by what he sees, Shanks himself is then attacked by Mike's apparition. The ghost then sets the house on fire.

Shanks is thrown down the stairs and Marnie follows, escaping out the window to safety, but returning when she hears Shanks inside awake and searching for her. She helps him outright as Mike's ghost pulls her back through the window. As the two struggle, Marnie removes her ring and throws it at her ex-husband's ghost. The ghost catches it and then disappears in a ball of fire. As a crowd of people begins gathering outside, Shanks tells her to escape. Marnie is then seen on a bus, while a passenger reads a USA Today paper, where the headline proclaims she died in the fire saving Shanks' life.

== Cast ==
- Famke Janssen as Marnie Watson
- Bobby Cannavale as Detective Lou Shanks
- Ed Westwick as Joseph "Joey" DiCenzo
- Michael Paré as Mike Watson
- Patricia Charbonneau as Frances
- Kevin Geer as Father Pritchet

== Release ==
The film played on Syfy on April 26, 2009. The DVD was in limited release two days later. It was released nationwide on October 6, 2009 through The Asylum.

== Reception ==
Brian Collins of Bloody Disgusting rated the film 4/5 stars and said, "Like I’ve said before, I don’t usually find ghosts/supernatural type things to be particularly scary, but this one works." Steve Barton of Dread Central rated the film 3.5/5 and called it a "surprisingly spooky little flick."

== See also ==
- List of ghost films
