= International Detective =

1959 British television series

- Starring: Art Fleming
- Country of origin: United Kingdom
- Original language: English
- No. of series: 1
- No. of episodes: 39

Production
- Producer: A. Edward Sutherland
- Running time: 30m per episode
- Production company: ABPC

Original release
- Release: 26 December 1959 – 13 June 1961

International Detective is a 1959 British TV series.

== Plot ==
The global adventures of Ken Franklin, ace operative of the William J. Burns Detective Agency.

== Cast ==
- Art Fleming as Ken Franklin
- Anthony Jacobs as Inspector Cataldo
- Nigel Green as Montoro
- Tony Thawnton as Pritchard
- Jean Serret as Inspector Morand
