= Les Mauvaises fréquentations =

- Directed by: Jean Eustache
- Starring: Aristide; Daniel Bart
- Release date: 1963
- Running time: 42 minutes
- Country: France
- Language: French

Les Mauvaises fréquentations (En. Bad Company) is a 1963 short drama film written and directed by Jean Eustache. It stars Aristide and Daniel Bart.
