= The Last Outlaw (1993 film) =

1993 TV film

- Film poster
- Genre: Western
- Written by: Eric Red
- Directed by: Geoff Murphy
- Starring: Mickey Rourke; Dermot Mulroney
- Music by: Mason Daring
- Country of origin: United States
- Original language: English

Production
- Executive producer: Merrill H. Karpf
- Producer: John Davis
- Cinematography: Jack Conroy
- Editor: C. Timothy O'Meara
- Running time: 93 minutes
- Production company: HBO Pictures

Original release
- Network: HBO
- Release: October 30, 1993

The Last Outlaw is a 1993 American Western television film starring Mickey Rourke, Dermot Mulroney, Ted Levine, Daniel Quinn, Gavan O'Herlihy, Keith David, John C. McGinley, and Steve Buscemi, along with a variety of other known actors, which has since become a cult classic among Western genre fans. It was directed by Geoff Murphy and written by Eric Red. It was initially broadcast on HBO on October 30, 1993.

== Introduction ==
The story follows a band of former Confederate soldiers who were part of a cavalry unit that had fought during the American Civil War, with few surviving to its end. Their commander, Graff, had once been a heroic and staunch supporter of the southern cause, but after losing his family he became cold hearted and ruthless. His second in command is Eustis, whom Graff has trained since 1861 on the strategies of leadership and combat command, right down to knowing exactly how many rounds of ammunition each of his soldiers has. The film centers around the relationship between Graff and Eustis, and the irony of Eustis turning on Graff due to Graff making a decision that Eustis disagrees with, and which mirrors a decision Eustis is also forced to make himself as a commander later.

== Plot ==
When the war ends, the cavalry unit commanded by Graff makes the decision to stay together, and turn outlaw. They begin committing bank robberies, and are successful due to their experience and tactics. Local citizens and lawmen are no match for them. However, when a robbery goes horribly wrong, resulting in the unit being shot up badly, with Loomis badly wounded, they find themselves pursued by Marshal Sharp, who is capable and respected.

Graff makes the command decision to kill the injured Loomis so that he won't delay their escape. Eustis objects, and when Graff strikes Eustis then moves to shoot Loomis, Eustis instead shoots Graff. Graff falls out of his saddle and rolls down a hillside; thinking he is dead, Eustis takes command and leads the band toward Mexico, with the posse still in pursuit.

Marshal Sharp and the posse come upon the slightly wounded Graff, and take him prisoner. With Graff in chains, they continue their chase. Eustis sets up an ambush and several posse members are killed. During the chaos Graff kills Marshal Sharp. Now leaderless, the remaining men decide to return home. Banker McClintock reminds them that they will receive no reward money if they leave. Graff suggests that anyone who stays should take the reward share of those who leave; the men ask if that includes the share of those who were just killed. McClintock reluctantly says yes. With Graff now their leader, they set up an ambush. Graff shoots and kills Philo. A member of the posse tries to cut off Philo's trigger finger for a trophy. Graff puts his gun to the man's lips and tells him that because Philo was one of his (Graff's) men, everyone will show the proper respect.

Wills grabs the stolen money off Eustis' horse and rides back to leave it for the posse, believing this gesture will end the chase. When McClintock rides up to the spot on the hill where Wills leaves the money, Graff follows and throws both the money and the banker off the cliff. He then fires his guns to make it seem like there has been a shootout with the outlaws, and he tells the posse the situation had been a trap. Graff stands by as the posse engages in an internal shootout over what to do next. While Potts is giving Wills a beating for his action concerning the money, it becomes clear that the deed did not 'save their skins', as Lovecraft spots Graff and his remaining riders coming toward them. Eustis and Graff meet in an isolated saloon, but no peace is brokered. Graff says that Eustis owes him 'everything.'

Potts challenges Eustis' ability as a commander, but Eustis beats him in a fist fight. As the outlaws continue trekking to Mexico, Graff shoots Loomis from a hilltop. The others take cover behind rocks, but Loomis is left in the open; Graff tortures him, shooting him in different parts of the body every few seconds. Finally, Eustis is forced to put Loomis out of his misery. Later, the remaining outlaws encounter Graff almost as if he is a ghost, keeping them off-balance and nervous. During one of these encounters, Graff shoots Wills' horse. Wills rides with Lovecraft, but the horse cannot take the weight. Eustis decides it is necessary to leave Wills behind. Wills waits for the posse and stands his ground as long as he can, killing a couple of them before he is killed.

The three left briefly split up to investigate the whereabouts of Graff and his gang. Lovecraft chances upon Graff, who gives him extra ammunition, telling him he will be spared if he kills Eustis. When they reunite and Eustis gives Lovecraft ammunition to load his pistol, he finds that Lovecraft already has a full chamber. Eustis, knowing that Lovecraft did not have a full six rounds left, realizes that Lovecraft has betrayed him. However, when Eustis presses for Lovecraft to do what Graff sent him to do, Lovecraft is overwhelmed with fear and guilt, and commits suicide.

Eustis and Potts make for the Rio Grande, but as they are about to cross, Graff shoots Potts through the gut. Eustis makes a lone, final stand against the posse. He gets hit, but kills all of them except Graff. The two draw, and Eustis is faster, but his gun is empty. As Graff approaches, Eustis shoots him with a pocket derringer, which Graff had not counted on. Eustis crosses into Mexico, the last outlaw.

== Cast ==
- Mickey Rourke as Graff
- Dermot Mulroney as Eustis
- Ted Levine as Potts
- John C. McGinley as Frank Wills
- Steve Buscemi as Boris Philo
- Keith David as Lovecraft
- Daniel Quinn as Loomis
- Gavan O'Herlihy as Marshal Sharp
- Paul Ben-Victor as Posseman Grubb
- Richard Fancy as Banker McClintock
