= Rattlers (film) =

1976 snake horror movie

- DVD cover
- Directed by: John McCauley
- Written by: Jerry Golding; John McCauley
- Produced by: John McCauley
- Music by: Miles Goodman
- Distributed by: Boxoffice International Pictures
- Release date: April 23, 1976
- Running time: 82 minutes
- Country: United States
- Language: English

Rattlers is a 1976 horror film starring Sam Chew, Elisabeth Chauvet, Tony Ballen, Dan Priest, Ron Gold, Darwin Joston, and Gary Van Ormand. The film was produced, directed and co-written by John McCauley. Harry Novak, head of Boxoffice International Pictures was the executive producer. The film features an early score by composer Miles Goodman.

== Plot ==
When two young boys are savagely attacked and killed by a legion of rattlesnakes in a small California desert town, the local sheriff calls upon herpetologist Dr. Tom Parkinson, a Los Angeles college professor, to discover why the snakes are displaying abnormal aggression and swarming behavior. The sheriff teams Parkinson with war photographer Ann Bradley.

As more people in the desert town are killed by the vicious rattlesnakes, Parkinson's and Bradley's investigation leads them to a nearby army base, where the commanding officer, Colonel Stroud, seems strangely reluctant to help them. Parkinson and Bradley are, however, assisted by the base's chief medical officer, Captain Delaney.

Shortly afterward, Palmer and Woodley, two soldiers on night patrol, stop to change a flat tire on their jeep and are killed by a horde of rattlesnakes. Delaney then summons Parkinson and Bradley back to the base, without Stroud's knowledge, so they can investigate the soldiers' strange deaths.

Eventually, Parkinson discovers that the colonel ordered, and then covered up, the illegal disposal of an experimental nerve gas called "CT3" in one of the local desert caves. The exposure of the snakes to the nerve gas had made them unusually aggressive. When Delaney drunkenly confronts Stroud and threatens to expose his crime, Stroud kills him. Stroud then engages the local sheriff's department in a gun battle and is killed.

== Cast ==
- Sam Chew as Dr. Tom Parkinson
- Elisabeth Chauvet as Ann Bradley
- Dan Priest as Colonel Stroud
- Tony Ballen as Sheriff Gates
- Ron Gold as Captain Delaney
- Al Dunlap as General Hinch
- Dan Balentine as Pilot Hawkins
- Darwin Jostin as Palmer
- Gary Van Orman as Woodley
- Cary Pitts as Sergeant
- Eric Lawson as Guard
- Richard Lockmiller as Deputy
- Jo Jordan as Mother
- Scott McCarter as Rick
- Tipp McClure as Steve the Plumber
- Celia Kaye as Woman in Bath
- Travis Gold as Timmy
- Alan Decker as Doug
- Bob Merchon as Howard
- Ancel Cook as Sam the Janitor
- Matthew Knox as Pilot
- John Landon as Hines

== Cinematic Titanic Live ==
Cinematic Titanic, a "revival" project by several former cast members of Mystery Science Theater 3000 (including series creator Joel Hodgson), chose Rattlers as one of the films for their 2011 Cinematic Titanic Live tour. Their treatment of the film debuted at the Pepito's Parkway Theater in Minneapolis, Minnesota on September 17, 2011.

== Sequel ==
Dustin Ferguson directed a sequel, Rattlers 2, starring Mel Novak, Brinke Stevens, and Dawna Lee Heising. It premiered on After Hours Cinema on WGUD-TV January 8, 2021.

== See also ==
- List of killer snake films
