= Assault on Precinct 13 (1976 film) =

1976 film by John Carpenter

- US film poster
- Directed by: John Carpenter
- Written by: John Carpenter
- Produced by: J. S. Kaplan
- Starring: Austin Stoker; Darwin Joston; Laurie Zimmer
- Cinematography: Douglas Knapp
- Edited by: John Carpenter (Note: Credited as 'John T. Chance'.)
- Music by: John Carpenter
- Production company: The CKK Corporation
- Distributed by: Turtle Releasing Organization
- Release date: November 3, 1976
- Running time: 91 minutes
- Country: United States
- Language: English
- Budget: $100,000

Assault on Precinct 13 is a 1976 American independent action-thriller film written, directed, scored, and edited by John Carpenter. It features Austin Stoker as a police officer who defends a defunct precinct against a relentless criminal gang, and Darwin Joston as a death row–bound convict who assists him. Laurie Zimmer, Tony Burton, Martin West, Charles Cyphers, and Nancy Kyes co-star as other defenders of the precinct, as well as victims of the ensuing siege.

Carpenter was approached by producer J. Stein Kaplan to make a low-budget exploitation film for under $100,000, on the condition that Carpenter would have total creative control. Carpenter's script, originally titled The Anderson Alamo, was inspired by the Howard Hawks Western film Rio Bravo and the George A. Romero horror film Night of the Living Dead. Controversy with the MPAA over a scene involving the violent killing of a young girl nearly caused the film to receive an X rating.

Assault on Precinct 13 opened in the United States on November 5, 1976. It was initially met with mixed reviews and unimpressive box-office returns, but when the film premiered in the 1977 London Film Festival, it received an ecstatic review by festival director Ken Wlaschin that led to critical acclaim first in Britain and then throughout Europe. It has garnered a cult following and reappraisal from critics, with many evaluating the film as one of the best action films of its era and of Carpenter's career.

A remake was released in 2005, directed by Jean-François Richet and starring Ethan Hawke and Laurence Fishburne.

== Plot ==
In South-Central Los Angeles, a local gang, Street Thunder, steals a cache of assault rifles and pistols. At 3:00 am on a Saturday in Anderson, a crime-infested ghetto, a team of heavily armed LAPD officers ambush and kill six members of the gang. Later, the gang's four warlords swear a blood oath of revenge against the police and the citizens of Los Angeles.

That afternoon, Lieutenant Ethan Bishop, a newly promoted CHP officer, is assigned to take charge of the decommissioned Anderson police precinct during the last few hours before it is permanently closed. Only a skeleton staff remains, including Sergeant Chaney and the station's two secretaries, Leigh and Julie. A prison bus arrives commanded by Officer Starker, who is seeking medical help for one of three inmates being transported to the state penitentiary: Napoleon Wilson, a convicted murderer bound for death row; Wells; and Caudell, who is sick. Across town, the Street Thunder warlords drive around looking for people to kill. One of the warlords fatally shoots a little girl, Kathy, and the driver of an ice cream van. Kathy's father, Lawson, pursues and kills the warlord before other gang members chase him into the Anderson precinct. In shock, Lawson is unable to communicate what has happened to him.

As Starker's prisoners are placed in cells, the telephone lines go dead, and the station's electricity goes out. While Starker prepares to move the prisoners back onto the bus, the gang opens fire on the precinct, using weapons fitted with silencers. In seconds, they kill Chaney, the bus driver, Caudell, Starker, and two officers accompanying Starker. Bishop unchains Wilson from Starker's body and puts Wilson and Wells back into the cells. When the gang members begin a second wave of shooting, Bishop sends Leigh to release Wells and Wilson, and the four of them repel an attempted invasion. However, Julie is killed during the firefight, while Leigh is shot and wounded in one arm.

The gang members remove all evidence of the skirmish to avoid attracting outside attention. Bishop hopes that someone has heard the police weapons firing, but the neighborhood is too sparsely populated, due to most of the housing being scheduled for demolition, for nearby residents to pinpoint the location of the noise. Wells is chosen to sneak out of the precinct through a sewer line. After hot-wiring a nearby car, he is killed by a gang member hiding in the back seat before he can get to a telephone. Meanwhile, two police officers responding to reports of gunfire find the dead body of a telephone repairman hanging from a pole near the police station and call for backup.

As the gang rallies for an all-out final assault, Wilson, Leigh, and Bishop retreat to the station's basement, taking the still-catatonic Lawson with them. They protect themselves with a large, durable metal sign as the gang violently storms the building. Bishop shoots a tank full of acetylene gas, which explodes and kills all the gang members in the narrow basement hallway. The remainder of the gang flees as police arrive to secure the station. Venturing down into the basement, the officers discover that Bishop, Leigh, Wilson, and Lawson are the only survivors. Lawson is strapped onto a stretcher and removed. Another stretcher is offered to Leigh, but, after she and Wilson exchange a long look, she declines it and exits unassisted. When an officer attempts to handcuff Wilson, Bishop angrily intervenes before asking Wilson to walk out of the station with him.

== Cast ==
- Austin Stoker as Lieutenant Ethan Bishop
- Darwin Joston as Napoleon Wilson
- Laurie Zimmer as Leigh
- Martin West as Mr. Lawson
- Tony Burton as Wells
- Charles Cyphers as Officer Starker
- Nancy Loomis as Julie
- Peter Bruni as Ice Cream Man
- John J. Fox as Prison Warden
- Marc Ross as Patrolman Tramer
- Alan Koss as Patrolman Baxter
- Henry Brandon as Sergeant Chaney
- Kim Richards as Kathy Lawson
- Peter Frankland as Caudell
- Gilman Rankin as Bus Driver
- Frank Doubleday, Gilbert De La Pena, Al Nakauchi, and James Johnson as the Street Thunder Warlords
- James Jeter as Police Captain (uncredited)
- John Carpenter as Gang Member (uncredited)

== Production ==
Following the release of Dark Star, Assault and a second script entitled Eyes were supposed to be two low-budget films written and directed by John Carpenter, with financing by J. Stein Kaplan. After reviewing the first draft of Assault and following the sale of the script Eyes to Barbra Streisand and Jon Peters, later renamed Eyes of Laura Mars, Kaplan and Kaufman concentrated on just Assault. "J. Stein Kaplan was a friend of mine from USC," said Carpenter. "He knew Joseph Kaufman from his days in Philadelphia ... Basically their fathers were funding Assault on Precinct 13". The two families of the producers formed the CKK Corporation to finance the film.

=== Screenplay ===
Carpenter had hoped to make a Howard Hawks-style Western like El Dorado or Rio Lobo, but when the $100,000 budget prohibited it, Carpenter refashioned the basic scenario of Rio Bravo into a modern setting. Carpenter employed the pseudonym "John T. Chance", after John Wayne's character in Rio Bravo, for his original version of the script, entitled The Anderson Alamo, but he used his own name for the writing credit on the completed film, using 'Chance' for his film editing credit. The script was written in eight days. Carpenter joked, "The script came together fast, some would say too fast."

Carpenter's script makes many allusions to film history and inspirations for this film. It has many references to the films of Howard Hawks. For example, the character of Leigh, played by Laurie Zimmer, was a reference to Rio Bravo writer Leigh Brackett. (Carpenter later featured a character named 'Sheriff Leigh Brackett' in Halloween). The running gag of having Napoleon Wilson constantly ask, "Got a smoke?", was inspired by the cigarette gags used in many of Hawks's Westerns. Also, subtle references are made to directors Sergio Leone and Alfred Hitchcock. The day and time titles were used to make the film feel more like a documentary.

=== Casting and pre-production ===
Assault underwent several months of preproduction. Carpenter assembled a main cast that consisted mostly of experienced but relatively obscure actors. The two leads were Austin Stoker, who had appeared previously in Battle for the Planet of the Apes and Sheba, Baby, and Darwin Joston, who had worked primarily in theatre and television and was also Carpenter's next-door neighbor. Carpenter cast veteran Western actor Henry Brandon, notably of The Searchers, as police officer Cheney. Boxer-turned-actor Tony Burton, soon to be known as Tony "Duke" Evers in the Rocky films, was cast as the convict Wells, in part due to his own prior stint in prison for armed robbery. After an open casting call, Carpenter added Charles Cyphers and Nancy Loomis to the cast.

Behind the scenes, Carpenter worked with cinematographer Doug Knapp (a fellow USC student), art director Tommy Lee Wallace, sound mixer Bill Varney and property master Craig Stearns. "I hardly knew what the job required," said Wallace, "but he believed in me, and, of course my price was right. It was typical of John during those lean days. He made the very best of whatever talent and facilities he had around him."

Carpenter drew storyboards for key sequences, including the "ice cream truck" sequence, the death of the white warlord, Napoleon Wilson struggling to get the keys off the guard after the siege starts, and the failed escape by prisoner Wells.

=== Filming ===
Assault started in November 1975 and was shot in only 20 days, including Thanksgiving, on a budget of $100,000. (Note: Variety incorrectly reported in 1977 that the film cost $200,000.) The film was shot on 35-mm Panavision in a 2.39:1 anamorphic aspect ratio on Metrocolor film stock, and was Carpenter's first experience with Panavision cameras and lenses. Carpenter has referred to this film as the most fun he has ever had directing.

Two weeks of shooting indoors were followed by two weeks on-location. The interiors of the police station were shot on the now-defunct Producers Studios set, while the exterior shots and jail cells were from the old Venice police station. The bus traveling to Sonora was shot on a closed section of the Los Angeles freeway system, with cast and crew having lunch on the freeway. Carpenter's philosophy to making Assault, which he believes can be applied to making any low-budget film, was to shoot as little footage as possible and extend the scenes for as long as he could.

The first scene, in which several gang members of Street Thunder are gunned down by cops, was shot at USC. The gang members were played by USC students, who Carpenter remembered had a lot of fun finding ways of dying while spilling blood over themselves.

"The first night I saw dailies," replied art director Wallace, "projected on a bedsheet in the producer's ratty apartment... My jaw dropped and I sat up so straight I cast a shadow with my head. This looked like a zillion dollars. This looked like a real movie."

=== Music ===
Assault on Precinct 13

Soundtrack album by John Carpenter
- Released: 2003
- Recorded: 1976
- Genres: Electronic; film score; minimalist
- Length: 25:09
- Label: Record Makers

John Carpenter chronology
Ghosts of Mars (2001)	Assault on Precinct 13 (2003)	Lost Themes (2015)

One of the film's distinctive features is its score, written in three days by John Carpenter and performed by Carpenter and Tommy Lee Wallace. Carpenter, assisted by Dan Wyman, had several banks of synthesizers that would each have to be reset when another sound had to be created, taking a great deal of time. "When I did my original themes for [Assault] ... it was done with very old technology," replied Carpenter. "It was very difficult to get the sounds, and it took very long to get something simple." Carpenter made roughly three to five separate pieces of music and edited them to the film as appropriate.

The main title theme, partially inspired by both Lalo Schifrin's score to Dirty Harry and Led Zeppelin's "Immigrant Song", is composed of a pop synthesizer riff with a drum machine underneath that "builds only in texture, but not thematically," according to David Burnand and Miguel Mera. A held, high synthesizer note, with no other changes except inner frequency modulations, becomes the musical motif of the gang members, and reoccurs during certain violent acts in the film. In the film, synthesizers and drum machines represent the city and the gang.

Carpenter also uses a plaintive electric piano theme when Lt. Bishop first enters the abandoned precinct. It reoccurs in the film during the quiet moments of the siege, becoming in effect a musical articulation of rhythm of the siege itself. Bishop is heard whistling the tune of this particular theme at the beginning and end of the film, making the electric piano theme "a non-diegetic realization of a diegetic source." Burnand and Mera have noted that "there is some attempt to show the common denominators of human behavior regardless of 'tribal' affiliations, and there is a clear attempt to represent this through simple musical devices."

Many film critics who praised the film also praised the musical score by Carpenter. As John Kenneth Muir noted, "Carpenter wrote the riveting musical score for Assault... The final result was a unique, synthetic sound that is still quite catchy, even after 20 years ... Delightfully, it even serves as a counterpoint in one important scene." Dave Goldner of SFX wrote that Assault had "one of the most catchy theme tunes in film history." In early 2004, Piers Martin of NME wrote that Carpenter's minimalist synthesizer score accounted for much of the film's tense and menacing atmosphere and its "impact, 27 years on, is still being felt."

A vocal version of the theme, titled You Can't Fight It, with lyrics and production by Kenny Lynch, was recorded by Trinidad singer Jimmy Chambers and released in the UK as a 45 on the Pye label in April 1978, but it failed to chart and is now a rare item. Beyond its use in the film, the score is often cited as an influence on various electronic and hip hop artists with its main title theme being sampled by artists including Afrika Bambaataa, Tricky, Dead Prez, and Bomb the Bass. The main theme was reworked in 1986 as an Italo disco 12" and more famously as the 1990 UK-charting rave-song "Hardcore Uproar".

Despite this influence, except for a few compilation appearances, the film's score remained available only in bootleg form until 2003, when it was given an official release through the French label, Record Makers.

=== Post-production ===
Carpenter edited the film using the pseudonym John T. Chance; his frequent collaborator Debra Hill served as assistant editor. According to Carpenter, the editing process was a bare-bones process. One mistake Carpenter was not proud of was one shot "cut out of frame", which means the cut is made within the frame so a viewer can see it. Assault was shot on Panavision, which takes up the entire negative, and edited on Moviola, which cannot show the whole image, so if a cut was made improperly (i.e., frame line not lined up properly), then one would cut a half of a sprocket into the film and "cut out of frame," as happened to Carpenter. In the end, it did not matter because he said, "It was so dark, no one could see it, thank God!"

Tommy Lee Wallace, the film's art director, spoke admiringly about Carpenter during post. "[Carpenter] asked if I could cut sound effects. The answer, of course, was 'Sure!' Once again, here I was, a perfectly green recruit, yet John made a leap of faith ... he further insisted we get the best processing money could buy, which at that time was the legendary MGM color labs. Finally, he insisted we get the best post-production sound money could buy, which was Samuel Goldwyn Sound, another legend. The expense for this unorthodox approach ate up a huge amount of the budget. The production manager fumed that we were exploiting people to pay for processing— and it was true."

== Release ==
Although the film's title is Assault on Precinct 13, the action mainly takes place in a police station referred to as Precinct 9, Division 13, by Bishop's staff sergeant over the radio. The film's distributor was responsible for the misnomer. Carpenter originally called the film The Anderson Alamo before briefly changing the title to The Siege to shop to distributors. (Note: The Siege was later used as the title of another controversial film, a 1998 drama about terrorist attacks in the U.S. starring Bruce Willis and Denzel Washington.) The film was acquired by Irwin Yablans. During post-production, however, the distributor rejected Carpenter's title in favor of the film's present name. The moniker "Precinct 13" was used to give the new title a more ominous tone. When the film became popular in Britain, Michael Myers of Miracle Films purchased the British theatrical distribution rights.

The film was released in Germany on September 3, 1979, under the title Assault – Anschlag bei Nacht, or Assault–Attack at Night.

The most infamous scene in the movie occurs when a gang member casually shoots a little girl (Kathy) standing near an ice-cream truck, with her death being shown in graphic, bloody detail. The MPAA, headed by Richard Heffner at the time, threatened to give the film an X rating if the scene were not cut. Following the advice of his distributor, Carpenter gave the appearance of complying by cutting the scene from the copy he gave to the MPAA, but he distributed the film with the "ice-cream truck" scene intact, a common practice among low-budget films. Carpenter regrets shooting the ice-cream scene in such an explicit fashion: "it was pretty horrible at the time ... I don't think I'd do it again, but I was young and stupid."

The film eventually received an R rating and has a running time of 91 minutes. (Note: The full running time of the film's 2003 DVD release is 90 minutes and 55 seconds.)

== Reception ==
=== Initial reception ===
Assault was first released in Los Angeles at the State Theater on November 3, 1976, to mixed reviews and unimpressive box-office earnings. Whitney Williams of Variety wrote, "Some exciting action in the second half packs enough interest to keep this entry alive for the violence market ... John Carpenter's direction of his screenplay, after a pokey opening half, is responsible for the realistic movement." Dan O'Bannon, Carpenter's co-writer on Dark Star, attended the Los Angeles premiere. At this point in their professional relationship, O'Bannon was envious of Carpenter's success and reluctantly attended the premiere. O'Bannon was disgusted by the film and told Carpenter so. According to author Jason Zinoman, O'Bannon saw a reflection of the coolness that Carpenter displayed toward him in the film's casual disregard for the humanity of its characters. It reminded him of how easily their friendship had been discarded. "His disdain for human beings would be serviced if he could make a film without people in it", replied O'Bannon.

The film opened at the Cannes Film Festival in May 1977, where it received favorable notices from some of the British critics. "Carpenter at Cannes wiped us off the face of the earth with Precinct 13" replied director George A. Romero, who was at the festival with his film Martin. "Right from the scene when the little girl gets blown away, I was blown away." As a result, festival director Linda Myles booked the film for the Edinburgh Film Festival in August 1977. However, the film did not get critical acclaim until it was screened at the 21st London Film Festival on December 1, 1977. Ken Wlaschin, festival director, described the film in the brochure:

John Carpenter, whose small-budget science-fiction epic Dark Star was widely acclaimed, has turned his inventive imagination to the thriller for his first solo directional effort. The result, even without taking into consideration his tiny budget and cast of unknowns, is astonishing. Assault on Precinct 13 is one of the most powerful and exciting crime thrillers from a new director in a long time. It grabs hold of the audience and simply doesn't let go as it builds to a crescendo of irrational violence that reflects only too well our fears of unmotivated attack... It is a frightening look at the crumbling of rational ideas of law and order under an irresistible attack by the forces of irrationality and death.

Wlaschin found Assault to be the best film of the London Film Festival and included it in his "Action Cinema" section of that festival. It became one of the festival's best-received films, garnering tremendous critical and popular acclaim. According to Derek Malcolm of the Guardian, the applause was "deafening". Carpenter was delighted by the new praise.

The overwhelmingly positive British response to the film led to its critical and commercial success throughout Europe. Derek Malcolm of Cosmopolitan wrote, "[The film] is fast becoming one of the cult movies of the year ... The great virtue of the film is the way it grabs hold of its audience and simply refuses to let go. It exploits all our fears of irrational violence and unmotivated attack, and at the same time manages to laugh at itself without spoiling the tension - a very considerable feat. Carpenter, who is clearly a director with places to go, has succeeded in making a comedy that scares the pants off us. And don't think you're laughing at it. As a matter of fact, it's laughing at you." (Note: Derek Malcolm is quoted on two of the British Assault posters as calling it "The Cult Film of the Year".) Malcolm later wrote that he held some reservations about the film: "I don't feel like going on and on about the movie, partly because I think it is in grave danger of being oversold anyway, and partly because it isn't much more to me than tremendous fun". The film broke one house record in the UK and was named one of the best films of the year by critics and moviegoers.

=== Later reception ===
Lean, taut and compellingly gritty, John Carpenter's loose update of Rio Bravo ranks as a cult action classic and one of the filmmaker's best.

— Rotten Tomatoes' consensus for Assault

Over the years, the film has received acclaim from critics, emphasizing Carpenter's resourceful abilities as director, writer, editor, and music composer, and Douglas Knapp's stylish cinematography, as well as exceptional acting from Austin Stoker, Darwin Joston, Laurie Zimmer, and Tony Burton.

Vincent Canby of The New York Times wrote, "[Assault] is a much more complex film than Mr. Carpenter's 'Halloween,' though it's not really about anything more complicated than a scare down the spine. A lot of its eerie power comes from the kind of unexplained, almost supernatural events one expects to find in a horror movie but not in a melodrama of this sort ... If the movie is really about anything at all, it's about methods of urban warfare and defense. Mr. Carpenter is an extremely resourceful director whose ability to construct films entirely out of action and movement suggests that he may one day be a director to rank with Don Siegel." Jeffrey Wells of Films In Review wrote, "Skillfully paced and edited, Assault was rich with Hawksian dialogue and humor, especially in the clever caricature of the classic 'Hawks woman' by Laurie Zimmer." Tom Allen and Andrew Sarris of the Village Voice described the film as "one of the most stylishly kinetic independent films of the 1970s." Alan Jones of Starburst wrote, "Bravura remake of Rio Bravo."

Dave Golder of SFX magazine hailed the film as, "A superb, bloody thriller about a siege in an abandoned L.A. cop station." In his book The Horror Films of the 1970s, John Kenneth Muir gave the film three and a half stars, calling it "a lean, mean exciting horror motion picture... a movie of ingenuity, cunning and thrills." Mick Martin & Marsha Porter of the Video Movie Guide gave the film four and a half stars out of five, writing, "...John Carpenter's riveting movie about a nearly deserted L.A. police station that finds itself under siege by a youth gang. It's a modern-day version of Howard Hawks' Rio Bravo, with exceptional performances by the entire cast." In 2003, Dalton Ross of Entertainment Weekly described Assault as "a tight, tense thriller ... Carpenter's eerie score and Douglas Knapp's stylish cinematography give this low-budget shoot-out all the weight of an urban Rio Bravo." Leonard Maltin also gave the film three and a half stars out of four: "A nearly deserted L.A. police station finds itself under a state of siege by a youth gang in this riveting thriller, a modern-day paraphrase of Howard Hawks' Rio Bravo. Writer/director Carpenter also did the eerie music score for this knockout."

Tim Pulleine of The Guardian described the film as superficial despite successfully meeting the requirements of the genre. Brian Lindsey of Eccentric Cinema gave the film 6 out of a scale of 10, saying the film "isn't believable for a second—yet this doesn't stop it from being a fun little B picture in the best drive-in tradition".

The film has a 92% approval rating on Rotten Tomatoes based on 90 reviews. The site's consensus reads: "With propulsive direction and gritty Hawksian toughness, director John Carpenter turns the pulpy premise of Assault on Precinct 13 into a startling blend of pitch-black humor and hard-nosed action." On Metacritic, the film has a weighted average score of 89 out of 100, based on 7 critics, indicating "Universal acclaim".

=== Accolades ===
John Carpenter won the 1978 annual British Film Institute award for the "originality and achievement of his first two films", Dark Star and Assault, at the 1977 London Film Festival.

The film is recognized by American Film Institute in these lists:

- 2001: AFI's 100 Years...100 Thrills – Nominated

== Legacy and remake ==
Assault on Precinct 13 is now considered by many to be one of the greatest and most underrated action films of the 1970s, as well as one of the best films in John Carpenter's career. In the July 1999 issue, Premiere put the film on its list of 50 "Lost and Profound" unsung film classics, writing:

A trim, grim, vicious, and incredibly effective action movie with no cut comic-relief bit players, no winks at the audience, and no stars. Just a powder keg of a premise (lifted in part from Howard Hawks's Rio Bravo), in which a quasiterrorist group's killing spree culminates in the action described in the title. Carpenter's mastery of wide-screen and almost uncanny talent at crafting suspense and action sequences make Assault such a nerve-racking experience that you may have to reupholster your easy chair after watching it at home.

In 1988, Alan Jones of Starburst said Assault is "arguably still the best film [Carpenter] ever made." In 2000 John Kenneth Muir placed the film at No. 3 on his rated list of John Carpenter's filmography, behind The Thing and Halloween. In October 2007, Noel Murray and Scott Tobias of The A.V. Club also ranked Assault at No. 3 of John Carpenter's best films ("The Essentials"), saying, "The first John Carpenter film that really feels like a John Carpenter film, this homage to Howard Hawks Westerns suggests a path that Carpenter's career might've taken if Halloween hadn't become such a hit. Carpenter's made many different kinds of movies over the course of his long career, but he hasn't gotten to return often enough to terse tales of gun-toting heroes and villains." In Jeff Chang's 2005 book, Can't Stop Won't Stop, he cites Assault on Precinct 13 as the start of "the urban horror" genre. Chang describes the film

Instead of Indian braves, Zulu warriors, or graveyard zombies, Assault on Precinct 13's heroes defended themselves in a desolate police station against marauding waves of dark, heavily armed gang members seeking revenge for their cop-killed brothers.

In his fifth edition of The New Biographical Dictionary of Film in 2010, film historian David Thomson described Assault as "a Hawksian set of a police station besieged by hoodlums - economical, tense, beautiful, and highly arousing. It fulfills all Carpenter's ambitions for gripping the audience emotionally and never letting go." Writers Michelle Le Blanc and Colin Odell have written of the film: "[Assault] looks as fresh as the day it was first screened; its violence still shocking, its soundtrack still effective, and both the dialogue and its delivery are top notch, all in a film whose $100,000 budget wouldn't satisfy the catering demands of the average Hollywood picture. This is because there is an overriding vision, a consistency to Carpenter's work that rewards repeat viewing and presents a single unifying world view."

Film director Edgar Wright and actor Simon Pegg are big fans of Assault. "You wouldn't really call it an action film," claims Pegg, "because it was pre- the evolution of that kind of film. And yet it is kind of an action film in a way." "It's very much his [Carpenter's] kind of urban Western", adds Wright, "in the way it is staging Rio Bravo set up in downtown '70s LA... And the other thing is, for a low-budget film particularly, it looks great." In October 2011, artist Tyler Stout premiered his mondo-style poster of Assault. Stout's poster would later serve as the cover on the Region B Blu-ray of Assault.

Assault has influenced a number of action films that came after, setting the rules for the genre that would continue with films such as Die Hard and The Matrix. The second section of From Dusk till Dawn was described by Variety as a "Night of the Living Dead-tinged offshoot of ... Assault on Precinct 13". The character of Scott wears a t-shirt with the words 'Precinct 13' on it as a homage to the film. In 2002, the film inspired Florent Emilio Siri's quasi-remake The Nest. The core plot of the film has reportedly inspired a 2019 Indian Tamil film Kaithi.

As a result of the film, John Carpenter went on to work with producer Irwin Yablans on Halloween, the most successful film of Carpenter's career. Due to the success of Assault in London, Carpenter named the Shape in Halloween after Michael Myers of Miracle Films, the British distributor for Assault. Myers's son Martin considered the tribute as a "tremendous honor" and "a lasting memorial to his late father". Donald Pleasence would go on to star in Carpenter's Halloween because his daughters were big fans of Assault. Debra Hill, the film's script supervisor, went on to produce Carpenter's future features and become his girlfriend.

In 2005, the film was remade by French director Jean-François Richet and starring Ethan Hawke and Laurence Fishburne. The Richet remake has been praised by some as an expertly made B-movie, and dismissed by others as formulaic, with many critics preferring the original Assault to the remake. (Note: Leonard Maltin gave two stars out of four for the 2005 remake, describing it as, "Violent remake of lean, mean John Carpenter B movie adds a variety of plot complications—and with each one, another layer of disbelief. Well crafted but laughable at times.")

== Themes and analysis ==
Critics and commentators have often described Assault as a cross between Howard Hawks's Rio Bravo and George A. Romero's Night of the Living Dead. Carpenter acknowledges the influence of both films.

In his 2000 book The Films of John Carpenter, John Kenneth Muir deconstructs Carpenter's use of Rio Bravo as a template for Assault: "Although [the film's] premise may sound like typical 1970s picture, it was quintessential Carpenter in execution — which meant it was really quintessential Howard Hawks. Of primary importance was not the bloodshed or action, but rather the developing friendship and respect in evidence between the white convict Napoleon Wilson and black cop Lt. Bishop ... also important in [Assault]'s homage to director Hawks was the unforgettable presence of actress Laurie Zimmer as a prototypical 'Hawksian Woman,' i.e., a female who gives as good as she gets and is both tough and feminine at the same time."

As with most of Carpenter's antagonists, Street Thunder is portrayed as a force that possesses mysterious origins and almost supernatural qualities. "Rather than going for any particular type of gang," replied Carpenter, "I decided to include everybody." The gang members are not humanized and are instead represented as though they were zombies or ghouls—they are given almost no dialogue, and their movements are stylized, with a slow, deliberate, relentless quality. Carpenter has acknowledged the influence of George A. Romero's Night of the Living Dead on his portrayal of the gang.

Assault was shot in 2.35:1 anamorphic Panavision widescreen, Carpenter's first use of the format that he would use on all of his feature films. (Note: The only exception to this rule was his 2010 film The Ward, which was shot in non-anamorphic 3-perf Super 35, giving a 2.35:1 aspect ratio.) "I just love Panavision," replied Carpenter. "It's a cinematic ratio."

== Home video releases ==
Assault was released on VHS by Media Home Entertainment in 1978 and on laserdisc by Image Entertainment on March 12, 1997. The '97 laserdisc came with commentary by John Carpenter, an isolated music score track and the original theatrical trailer.

The film was one of the first films to be released on the DVD medium on November 25, 1997, also by Image Entertainment. On March 11, 2003, Image Entertainment released in new widescreen "Special Edition" DVD of the film. Dalton Ross of Entertainment Weekly gave this 2003 DVD release a B+. Brian Lindsay of Eccentric Cinema gave the film's 2003 DVD release a 10 out of 10, the website's highest rating. Special features of the 2003 DVD release include:

- Film shown in anamorphic widescreen (2.35:1) with monaural Dolby Digital 2.0 audio.
- Q & A interview session with writer/director John Carpenter and actor Austin Stoker at American Cinematheque's 2002 John Carpenter retrospective (23 minutes)
- Original theatrical trailer
- 2 radio spots
- Behind-the-scenes and lobby card stills gallery (16 minutes)
- Full-length audio commentary by writer/director Carpenter taken from a 1997 laserdisc release
- Isolated music score, also taken from the 1997 laserdisc release

The film was later released on UMD video for the PlayStation Portable on July 26, 2005 and in a "Restored Collector's Edition" for both DVD and Blu-ray Disc in 2008 and 2009, respectively. Both releases have all of the special features found on the 2003 "Special Edition" DVD.

Assault on Precinct 13 was re-released on November 19, 2013, as Shout! Factory acquired the rights to release the film in the United States under its sublabel Scream Factory in a 'Collector's Edition'. Special features for this set include new interviews with actress Nancy Loomis Kyes and art director/sound effects designer Tommy Lee Wallace, and from previous editions, audio commentary from John Carpenter and Austin Stoker, theatrical trailer, and radio spots. All other special features from the previous editions have been excluded from this set. The film has also received Blu-ray releases in Germany, on May 25, 2012, in a '3-Disc Limited Collector's Edition' which includes two DVDs and contains a 24-page booklet in addition to the special features available on the Image Entertainment DVD and Blu-ray, with a subsequent standard edition released on November 16, 2012, in Australia, it is available via Umbrella Entertainment, released August 5, 2015. A '40th Anniversary Edition' became available in the United Kingdom by Second Sight, and features John Carpenter's score for the film on a bonus disc. The Blu-ray of the film is presented in its original aspect ratio of 2.35:1, with 5.1 DTS-HD surround sound and dual mono sound, and a plethora of special features including new interviews with actor Austin Stoker, executive producer Joseph Kaufman, and art director and sound effects designer Tommy Lee Wallace, along with commentaries from Wallace and John Carpenter, trailer and radio spots, and five art cards.

== See also ==
- List of American films of 1976
- List of hood films
