= John Baskin =

John Baskin may refer to:

- John Baskin (screenwriter) (fl. 1970s–1990s), American television writer and producer
- John Baskin (non-fiction writer) (born 1941), American writer and editor
