= Austin Stoker =

Trinidadian-American actor (1930–2022)

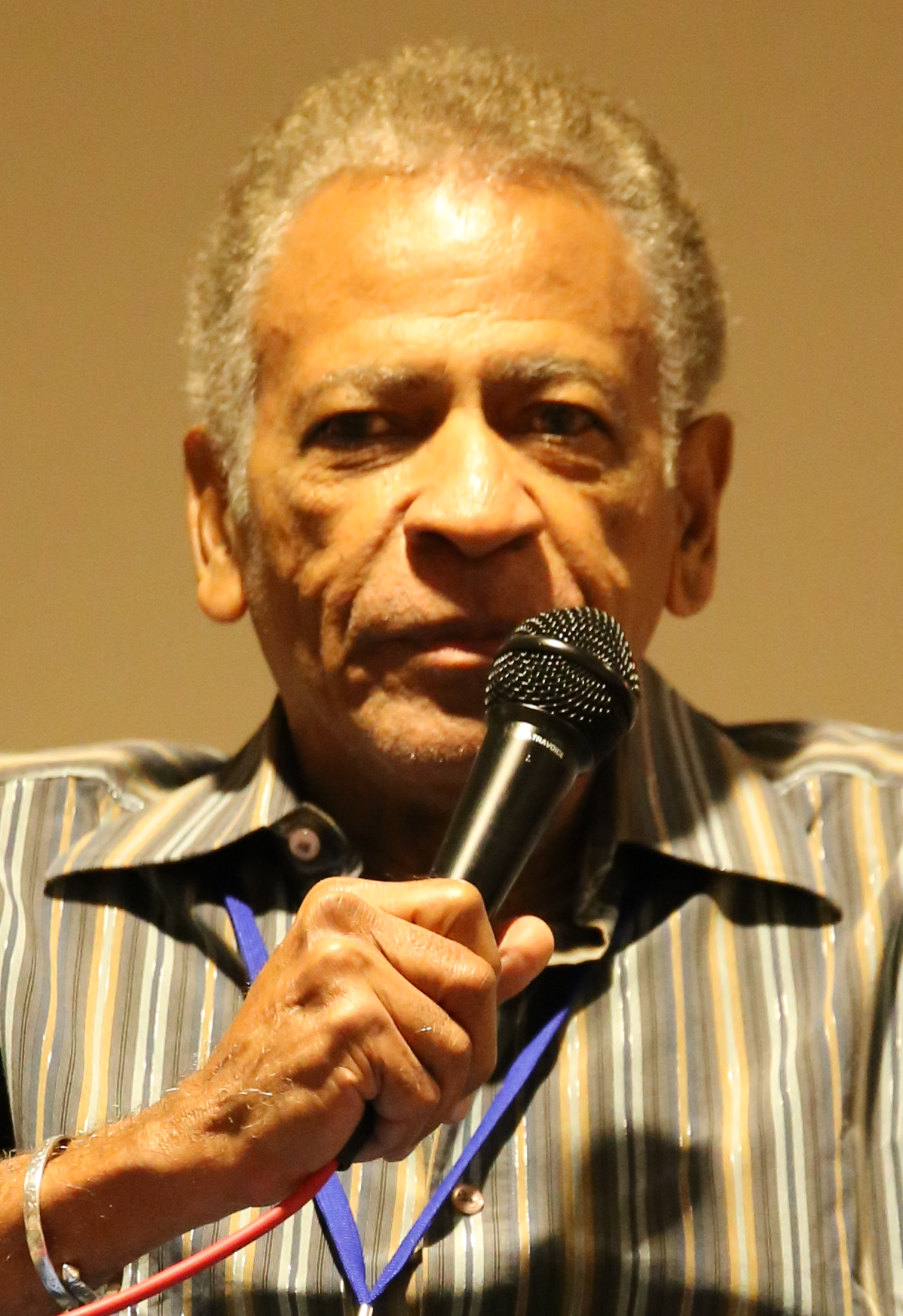
- Stoker in 2015
- Born: October 7, 1930; Port of Spain, Trinidad and Tobago
- Died: October 7, 2022 (aged 92); Los Angeles, California, United States
- Occupation: Actor
- Years active: 1954 –2022
- Spouse(s): Robin Stoker; Vivian Bonnell (m. 1959–2003)

Austin Stoker (October 7, 1930 – October 7, 2022) was a Trinidadian-American actor known for his role as Lt. Ethan Bishop, the police officer in charge of the besieged Precinct 9, Division 13, in John Carpenter's Howard Hawks-inspired 1976 film, Assault on Precinct 13. This was one of the few heroic starring roles for a black actor in an action film of the 1970s outside of the blaxploitation genre.

== Life and career ==
Stoker was born in Port of Spain, Trinidad and Tobago on October 7, 1930. He started his career on stage, including the 1954 Broadway production of Truman Capote's House of Flowers, where he met his future wife, Enid Mosier (acting name Vivian Bonnell). Prior to his role as Lt. Bishop, Stoker appeared in several blaxploitation films, often playing police detectives. Among these films were Abby (1974), Combat Cops (1974), and Sheba, Baby (1975), in which he played Pam Grier's love interest. Some of Stoker's other notable acting roles were in Battle for the Planet of the Apes (1973), Horror High (1974), Airport 1975 (1974), Victory at Entebbe (1976), and the 1977 television mini-series Roots.

Stoker is known to Mystery Science Theater 3000 fans for his role as Dr. Ken Melrose in the 1982 B-movie, Time Walker, in which he appeared with Darwin Joston, his co-star from Assault on Precinct 13.

== Death ==
Stoker died of renal failure at the Cedars-Sinai Medical Center in Los Angeles, California, on October 7, 2022, his 92nd birthday.

== Filmography ==
- Battle for the Planet of the Apes (1973) as Bruce MacDonald
- Horror High (1974) as Lieutenant Bozeman
- The Get-Man (1974) as LT. Frank Savage
- Return to the Planet of Apes (1975) as Astronaut Jeff Allen
- Airport 1975 (1974) as Air Force Sgt.
- Abby (1974) as Det. Cass Potter
- Sheba, Baby (1975) as Brick Williams
- Assault on Precinct 13 (1976) as Lt. Ethan Bishop
- Victory at Entebbe (1976, TV Movie) as Dr. Ghota
- Time Walker (1982) as Dr. Ken Melrose
- A Girl to Kill For (1990) as Guard Number One
- Two Shades of Blue (1999) as Security Guard
- Mach 2 (2000) as Edwards
- Between the Lines (2006) as Charles
- Machete Joe (2010) as Raymond Sinclair
- Give Til It Hurts (2015) as Reverend Bishop
- Descention (2016) as Brother Malcolm (rumored)
- Surge of Power: Revenge of the Sequel (2016) as Himself
- Shhhh (2017) as Dave
- 3 from Hell (2019) as Earl Gibson
- Double Down (2020) as Vincent Jamison II
- Give Till It Hurts (2022) as Reverend Bishop
