= La Rosiere de Pessac =

La Rosière de Pessac (The Virgin of Pessac) is the title of two hour-long films directed by Jean Eustache (in 1968 and 1979 respectively). The films cover an annual ceremony, held in Eustache's place of birth, in which the mayor and his associates nominate a girl as the town's most virtuous. Thus, the girls chosen in those two years are eponymous subjects of these documentaries.
