= Eric Red =

American screenwriter and director

- Born: Eric Joseph Durdaller; February 16, 1961 (age 65); Pittsburgh, Pennsylvania, U.S.
- Occupations: Screenwriter, film director, novelist

Eric Red (born Eric Joseph Durdaller; February 16, 1961) is an American screenwriter, director and novelist, best known for writing the horror films The Hitcher and Near Dark, as well as writing and directing Cohen and Tate.

== Biography ==
=== Early life ===
Red was born in Pittsburgh, Pennsylvania, the son of Nancy (née Pickhardt) and Cornelius Gerard Durdaller. He attended the AFI Conservatory and graduated in 1983.

=== Screenwriter career ===
The first film written by Red was Gunmen's Blues, a short he produced and directed while a student at the AFI Conservatory. He went broke trying to get national distribution for the film and had to drive a cab in New York City for a year to recoup.

His AFI thesis script, The Hitcher, was produced in 1986. A major studio remake of The Hitcher was released in 2007 with Red as a consultant. From the '80s through the '00s, his subsequent produced screenplays were Near Dark, Cohen and Tate, Blue Steel, Body Parts, The Last Outlaw, Undertow, Bad Moon and 100 Feet.

=== Director career ===
The first feature film directed by Red was Cohen and Tate in 1987. He subsequently directed the films Body Parts (1991), Undertow (1995), Bad Moon (1996) and 100 Feet (2008).

=== Novelist career ===
Eric Red published his first novel, Don't Stand So Close, in 2011. His subsequent published novels are The Guns of Santa Sangre (2013), The Wolves of El Diablo (2017), It Waits Below (2014), Noose (2018), Hanging Fire (2019), White Knuckle (2015), Strange Fruit (2014), Branded (2021) and The Crimson Trail (2021).

=== Car crash ===
Following a car accident, Red crashed his truck into a crowded bar in Los Angeles on May 31, 2000, resulting in the deaths of two patrons. After the incident, Red apparently exited his vehicle and attempted suicide by slitting his own throat with a piece of broken glass. News reports from the time stated that he had suffered from syncope with occasional blackouts. Among the witnesses were three retired FBI agents who were a few feet from the point of impact, with one stating for the police statement that Red appeared "wake and alert". Red survived the incident, was taken to the hospital under an alias and was released weeks later. It was disclosed at the investigation that Red was driving on a suspended license due to a collision the previous year while his insurance was lapsed, with Red stating to police that he did not know his license was suspended (he had renewed it in the last month of 1999). He later disclosed that he had lied to police, assuming that a stop would lead to his arrest. Thick skid marks from the front tires were spotted inside the bar.

No criminal charges were brought against Red, but a jury in a civil suit awarded monetary damages to the families of the victims, which challenged his claim of being treated for syncope by Dr. Herbert A. Rubin, who recanted these claims in his deposition. During the civil trial, he announced his move to Austin, Texas, to find employment and later filed Chapter 7 bankruptcy for the second time in his life (having done so in 1995). The suit, which awarded over a million dollars to the families of the two men killed in the accident, was appealed to state and federal courts, which confirmed the original jury finding.

== Filmography ==
Short films

Year	Title	Director	Writer	Editor
1981	Gunmen's Blues	Yes	Yes	Yes
1986	Telephone	Yes	Yes	Yes

Feature films

Year	Title	Director	Writer
1986	The Hitcher	No	Yes
1987	Near Dark	No	Yes
1989	Cohen and Tate	Yes	Yes
1990	Blue Steel	No	Yes
1991	Body Parts	Yes	Yes
1996	Bad Moon	Yes	Yes
2007	The Hitcher	No	Yes
2008	100 Feet	Yes	Yes

TV movies

Year	Title	Director	Writer
1993	The Last Outlaw	No	Yes
1996	Undertow	Yes	Yes
2015	Night of the Wild	Yes	No

== Bibliography ==
- Containment (2005) (graphic novel)
- Don't Stand So Close (2011)
- The Guns of Santa Sangre (2013)
- It Waits Below (2014)
- Strange Fruit (2014)
- White Knuckle (2015)
- The Wolves of El Diablo (2017)
- Noose (2018)
- Hanging Fire (2019)
- Branded (2021)
- The Crimson Trail (2021)
- Stopping Power (2021)
