= Jean Eustache =

French filmmaker (1938–1981)

- Born: 30 November 1938; Pessac, Gironde, France
- Died: 5 November 1981 (aged 42); Paris, France
- Occupations: Film director, editor
- Years active: 1961–1980

Jean Eustache (French: [ʒɑ̃ østaʃ]; 30 November 1938 – 5 November 1981) was a French film director and editor. During his short career, he completed numerous short films, in addition to a pair of highly regarded features, of which the first, The Mother and the Whore, is considered a key work of post-Nouvelle Vague French cinema.

In his obituary for Eustache, the critic Serge Daney wrote:

In the thread of the desolate 70s, his films succeeded one another, always unforeseen, without a system, without a gap: film-rivers, short films, TV programs, hyperreal fiction. Each film went to the end of its material, from real to fictional sorrow. It was impossible for him to go against it, to calculate, to take cultural success into account, impossible for this theoretician of seduction to seduce an audience.

Jim Jarmusch dedicated his 2005 film Broken Flowers to Eustache.

== Biography ==
Eustache was born in Pessac, Gironde, France, into a working class family. Relatively little information exists about Eustache's life prior to the time he became a member of the Cahiers du cinéma coterie in the late 1950s, though it is known that he was largely self-educated and worked in the railroad service prior to becoming a filmmaker. Information suggests that the mystery surrounding his youth was intentional, with sources stating that "during his lifetime Eustache published little information about his early years, indicating that he felt no nostalgia for an unhappy childhood."

Though not a member of the Nouvelle Vague, Eustache maintained ties to it, appearing as an actor in Jean-Luc Godard's Week End and editing Luc Moullet's Une aventure de Billy le Kid, which starred Jean-Pierre Léaud (the lead in Eustache's The Mother and the Whore).

After becoming a filmmaker, Eustache maintained close ties to his friends and relatives in Pessac. In 1981, he was partially immobilized in an auto accident. He killed himself by gunshot in his Paris apartment in November the same year, at the age of 42.

Eustache had a son, Boris Eustache (born 1960), who worked on his father's second feature and appears as an actor in Eustache's short film Les Photos d'Alix.

== Work ==
Eustache was quoted as saying, "The films I made are as autobiographical as fiction can be". Besides his fictional shorts and features, Eustache made numerous documentaries, including several shot in his hometown of Pessac, and a feature-length interview with his grandmother.

Eustache directed two narrative features. The Mother and the Whore (La maman et la putain), the first, is a 217-minute rumination on love, relationships, men and women. The film's central three-way romance plot focuses on Alexandre (Jean-Pierre Léaud), his girlfriend Marie (Bernadette Lafont) and the nurse he meets and falls in love with, Veronika (Françoise Lebrun).

Writing for Time Out New York in 1999, Andrew Johnston described his experience viewing the film:

One of the great, if all-too-infrequent, pleasures of being a film critic is having your mind blown by a film you didn't expect much from. Such an incident occurred in December 1997, when I was assigned to review Jean Eustache's 1973 film The Mother and the Whore, then beginning a revival engagement at Film Forum. Yes, I'd heard that it was a classic of French cinema, but I wasn't exactly thrilled at catching an early-morning screening of a three-hour-and-thirty-five-minute black-and-white foreign-language film that reportedly consisted of little more than people sitting around and talking. Frankly, I was a lot more excited about seeing Scream 2 that evening. Little did I know, as I eased into my seat, that I was in for one of the most memorable cinematic experiences of my life.

Eustache's second feature, My Little Loves (Mes petites amoureuses, 1974), was intentionally different from his debut. Shot in color by cinematographer Nestor Almendros (as opposed to The Mother and the Whore's grainy black-and-white), the film also features significantly less dialogue and focuses on teenage characters in a rural setting. The film was entered into the 9th Moscow International Film Festival.

Eustache appeared as an actor in The American Friend (1977).

=== Remakes and serial works ===
Eustache made two films about a religious parade in Pessac, both titled La Rosière de Pessac, in 1968 and 1979, and remade his short Une sale histoire twice. Regarding the tendency to re-examine in Eustache's work, the American film critic Jonathan Rosenbaum wrote: "An obsessive-compulsive filmmaker and clearly a tormented one who wound up dying by his own hand, Eustache was clearly experimenting with his variations as well as goading viewers into examining their own reactions to them".

== Filmography ==
=== Features ===
- 1966 Le Père Noël a les yeux bleus (47 minutes)
- 1968 La Rosière de Pessac (65 minutes)
- 1970 Le Cochon (65 minutes), directed with Jean-Michel Barjol
- 1971 Numéro zéro (110 minutes)
- 1973 La Maman et la putain (220 minutes)
- 1974 Mes petites amoureuses (120 minutes)
- 1977 Une sale histoire (50 minutes)
- 1979 La Rosière de Pessac (67 minutes)

=== Shorts and other work ===
- 1961 La soirée (unfinished)
- 1963 Les Mauvaises Fréquentations (42 minutes), a.k.a. Du côté de Robinson & Bad Company
- 1969 Sur Le dernier des hommes de Murnau (26 minutes) (TV movie)
- 1969 A propos de La petite marchande d'allumettes de Jean Renoir (26 minutes) (TV movie)
- 1980 Les Photos d'Alix (18 minutes)
- 1980 Le Jardin des délices de Jérôme Bosch (34 minutes)
- 1980 Offre d'emploi (18 minutes)
