= Frank Ferrara =

American gridiron football player (born 1975)

No. 95
- Position: Defensive end

Personal information
- Born: December 7, 1975 (age 50); Staten Island, New York, U.S.
- Listed height: 6 ft 3 in (1.91 m)
- Listed weight: 280 lb (127 kg)

Career information
- High school: New Dorp (Staten Island)
- College: Rhode Island
- NFL draft: 1999: undrafted

Career history
- New York Giants (1999–2000)*; Amsterdam Admirals (2000); San Diego Chargers (2000)*; New York Giants (2001–2002); Philadelphia Eagles (2003); New York Giants (2003); BC Lions (2005); Bergamo Lions (2024)
- * Offseason or practice squad member only
- Stats at Pro Football Reference

Frank Ferrara Jr. (born November 7, 1975) is an American former professional football player who was a defensive end for three seasons in the National Football League (NFL) for the New York Giants and Philadelphia Eagles. He played college football for the Rhode Island Rams.

Released five times before breaking into the Giants' lineup, Ferrara won recognition during his time in New York for his tenacity and effort. After retirement from the NFL he now resides as a Longshoreman in Staten Island, New York.
