= List of Hunter characters =

Hunter is a police drama television series starring Fred Dryer as "Sgt. Rick Hunter" and Stepfanie Kramer as "Sgt. Dee Dee McCall", which ran on NBC from 1984 to 1991. However, Kramer left after the sixth season (1990) to pursue other acting and musical opportunities. The seventh season saw Hunter partnered with two different women officers. The titular character, Sgt. Rick Hunter, was a wily, physically imposing, and often rule-breaking homicide detective (badge# 89 in the early seasons, badge# 378 in later seasons) with the Los Angeles Police Department. The "Pilot" TV movie premiered on September 18, 1984, with the regular series starting 10 days later. The show ended on April 26, 1991, after seven seasons. There are a total of 153 episodes, spanning seven years (1984–1991) of the show's run.

Created by Frank Lupo and Stephen J. Cannell, the show in its early episodes played as television's answer to Dirty Harry. Actor Dryer bears a striking resemblance to Dirty Harry actor Clint Eastwood, with his tall thin frame, chiselled facial structure and even a similar receding hairstyle. Even after the show's violence was toned down during the second season in hopes of boosting ratings, Hunter and McCall still managed to resolve many cases by shooting the perpetrators dead.

The show's executive producer during the first season was Stephen J. Cannell, whose company produced the series.

== Original series ==
=== Main cast ===
- Fred Dryer ... Det. Sgt. Richard "Rick" Hunter
- Stepfanie Kramer ... Det. Sgt. Dee Dee McCall (1984–1990)
- Charles Hallahan ... Capt. Charles "Charlie" Devane (1986–1991). Captain Devane joined the cast in the first episode of the third season, "Overnight Sensation". He replaced Captain Wyler and was a more confrontational boss, although not as hostile and unlike previous captains trusted Hunter & McCall's judgment on decisions pertaining to cases. Captain Devane remained for the rest of the series.

=== Supporting cast ===
The supporting cast of the series changed over the course of the series, occasionally within the same season.

- John Amos ... Capt. Dolan (1984–1985). Captain Dolan became the supervisor of Homicide Division starting in the sixth episode of the first season, "Legacy". Amos remained for the duration of the first season.
- Courtney Barilla ... Allison Novak (1991). The daughter of Chris Novak and her ex-husband Al.
- Richard Beauchamp ... Carlos (Asst. M.E.) (1985–1987). Debuted in the second season as an assistant medical examiner, often providing insight for Hunter and McCall.
- Arthur Rosenberg ... Capt. Lester D. Cain/Commander Lester D. Cain (1984/1987). Only appeared in the first few episodes of the first season as Captain Cain, later promoted to Commander. Appeared in Season 4, as Commander Cain in "City of Passion", parts 1 and 2. Michael Cavanaugh appeared as Captain Lester Cain in the TV Pilot, but did not appear in further episodes.
- Perry Cook ... Barney Udall (Coroner) (1986-1990). Appeared in the two-part episode "The Beautiful and the Dead" as a county coroner. Occasionally appeared in later episodes.
- Bruce Davison ... Captain Wyler (1985–87). Replaced John Amos as Hunter and McCall's supervisor Homicide Captain Wyler beginning in the first episode of the second season. Was promoted to Deputy Chief by the beginning of the third season and was replaced by Captain Charles "Charlie" Devane.
- Darlanne Fluegel ... Off. Joanne Molenski (1990–1991). Killed off midway through season 7.
- Stanley Kamel ... Gov. Agent Brad Wilkes (Occasional) (1987–1988)
- Lauren Lane ... Police Sgt. Chris Novak (1991). Molenski's replacement as Hunter's partner.
- Garrett Morris ... Arnold "Sporty" James (1986–1989). Debuted in the episode "The Return of Typhoon Thompson". Became a guest star informant in later appearances, beginning with the first episode of the third season.
- John Shearin ... Lt. Ambrose Finn (1985–88). Debuted in the episode "Blow-Up" as Homicide Lieutenant Ambrose Finn, a less confrontational immediate supervisor for Hunter and McCall. Killed off at the end of season 4.
- James Whitmore, Jr. ... Sgt. Bernie Terwilliger (1984-1986). An ambitious but incompetent detective. A regular cast member in the first season, the character moved to the Internal Affairs division during the second season and was an occasional guest star.

=== Guest appearances ===
==== Season One ====
| Episode | Actor | Character | Role |
|---|---|---|---|
| "Pilot" | Brian Dennehy | Dr. Bolin | Police psychiatrist / serial killer |
| "Pilot" | Michael Cavanaugh (actor) | Capt. Lester D. Cain | Homicide Captain (Pilot only) |
| "Hard Contract" | David Ackroyd | Gus Trancus | McCall's former partner turned hitman |
| "The Hot Grounder" | Sam J. Jones | Lance Lane | Tennis player |
| "The Hot Grounder" | William Windom | Commissioner Larry Crenshaw | Police Commissioner |
| "A Long Way from L.A." | Paul Eiding | Wally Wallerstean | Transport criminal |
| "A Long Way from L.A." | Bo Svenson | Jake Cutter | - |
| "Legacy" | Tony Longo | Dave Newton | - |
| "Legacy" | Al Ruscio | Carmine Santorro | - |
| "Legacy" | Mary-Margaret Humes | Sandy Newton | - |
| "Flight on a Dead Pigeon" | Gary Cervantes | - | - |
| "Pen Pals" | Jack O'Halloran | Hammer | Inmate |
| "Pen Pals" | Tracey Walter | Archie | Inmate |
| "Dead or Alive" | Wings Hauser | Jimmy Jo Walker | Bounty Hunter |
| "High Bleacher Man" | Richard Romanus | Nathan 'Nate' Demarest | Mob boss |
| "High Bleacher Man" | Alan Autry | Archie | Inmate |
| "The Shooter" | Beau Billingslea | - | Motorcycle cop |
| "The Shooter" | Marc Alaimo | Doug Kirkwood | - |
| "The Garbage Man" | Ed O'Neill | Dan Colson | Parole officer |
| "The Garbage Man" | Frances McDormand | Nina Sloan | Policewoman |
| "The Garbage Man" | Christopher McDonald | Sonny Dupree | Parolee |
| "The Garbage Man" | Nicholas Worth | Ramos | Parolee |
| "The Avenging Angel" | Robert Pastorelli | Willie Wakefield | - |
| "The Snow Queen, Pt. 1" | Dennis Farina | Vic Terranova | Club owner/ drug dealer |
| "The Snow Queen, Pt. 1" | Dennis Franz | Sgt. Jackie Molinas | Corrupt New York police sergeant |
| "The Snow Queen, Pt. 2" | Dennis Farina | Vic Terranova | Club owner/ drug dealer |
| "The Snow Queen, Pt. 2" | Dennis Franz | Sgt. Jackie Molinas | Corrupt New York police sergeant |
| "The Beach Boy" | Steven Williams | Parker LeMay | - |
| "The Beach Boy" | Jere Burns | Greg Jones | Drug pusher |
| "The Beach Boy" | Kerry Rossall | Eddie Marx | - |
| "The Beach Boy" | Brett Baxter Clark | Wes Kapano | Hawaiian hitman |
| "Guilty" | Ken Foree | Louis McMahon | Parolee |
| "Guilty" | Willard E. Pugh | Eddie | Conman |
| "The Last Kill" | Madison Mason | Kerry Le Masters / Tommy Largo | - |
| "The Last Kill" | Steven Keats | Jimmy Tomasino | Mafioso |
| "Fire Man" | William Russ | Jack Lachman | Vietnam vet |
| "Fire Man" | Belinda Balaski | Judy | Caretaker |
| "Fire Man" | Robert Desiderio | Gene Byrd | Vietnam vet / Fireman |
| "Fire Man" | Mark Schneider | Matt Gold | Reporter |
| "Fire Man" | Vivian Bonnell | Witness | |
| "Sniper" | James Cromwell | Seymour Robbins | IRS auditor |
| "Sniper" | Jack Starrett | Dennis Balzer | |
| "Sniper" | Joe Dorsey | Sgt. Louis Whitlow | |
| "Sniper" | Sandy Martin | Iris Balzer | |

==== Season Two ====
| Episode | Actor | Character | Role |
|---|---|---|---|
| "Case X" | Leo Rossi | Tony Cochran | - |
| "Case X" | Sam Anderson | Vinny Cochran | - |
| "Case X" | James Whitmore, Jr. | Sgt. Bernie Terwilliger | Internal Affairs Sergeant |
| "Night of the Dragons" | Clyde Kusatsu | Detective Lieutenant Raymond Lau | - |
| "Night of the Dragons" | James Hong | Chang | - |
| "The Biggest Man In Town" | Nana Visitor | Amy Laurton | - |
| "The Biggest Man In Town" | Gregory Itzin | Charlie Latimer | - |
| "The Biggest Man In Town" | Don Stroud | Sheriff Johnson | - |
| "The Biggest Man In Town" | Stuart Whitman | Raymond Bellamy | - |
| "Rich Girl" | Lois Hamilton | Ginger Flagg | - |
| "Rich Girl" | K. Callan | Mrs. Jorgensen | - |
| "Rich Girl" | John Calvin | Bradley Woolsey | - |
| "Rich Girl" | Dorian Lopinto | Cynthia Flagg | - |
| "Killer in the Halloween Mask" | Jesse Ventura | Jesse | - |
| "Killer in the Halloween Mask" | James Whitmore, Jr. | Sgt. Bernie Terwilliger | Internal Affairs Sergeant |
| "Killer in the Halloween Mask" | Tim Russ | Sam | - |
| "Killer in the Halloween Mask" | Gary Graham | David Talon | - |
| "Rape & Revenge, pt. 1" | Richard Yniguez | Raul Mariano | - |
| "Rape & Revenge, pt. 1" | Mike Pniewski | Dr. Lantree | - |
| "Rape & Revenge, pt. 1" | Larry Hankin | Jimmy Cracklin | - |
| "Rape & Revenge, pt. 1" | Michael Ansara | General Mariano | - |
| "Rape & Revenge, pt. 1" | Danny Ponce | Ignacio | - |
| "Rape & Revenge, pt. 1" | Jack Starrett | Dennis Balzer | - |
| "Rape & Revenge, pt. 2" | Richard Yniguez | Raul Mariano | - |
| "Rape & Revenge, pt. 2" | Mike Pniewski | Dr. Lantree | - |
| "Rape & Revenge, pt. 2" | Larry Hankin | Jimmy Cracklin | - |
| "Rape & Revenge, pt. 2" | Michael Ansara | General Mariano | - |
| "Rape & Revenge, pt. 2" | Danny Ponce | Ignacio | - |
| "Rape & Revenge, pt. 2" | Jack Starrett | Dennis Balzer | - |
| "Million Dollar Misunderstanding" | Robert Davi | Sonny Dunbar | - |
| "Million Dollar Misunderstanding" | Robert Englund | Vaughn | - |
| "Million Dollar Misunderstanding" | James Whitmore, Jr. | Sgt. Bernie Terwilliger | Internal Affairs Sergeant |
| "Million Dollar Misunderstanding" | Phil Rubenstein | Tito Constantine | - |
| "The Big Fall" | Vic Polizos | Fabro | - |
| "The Big Fall" | Mills Watson | Ray Longmire | - |
| "The Big Fall" | James Whitmore, Jr. | Sgt. Bernie Terwilliger | Internal Affairs Sergeant |
| "The Big Fall" | Jonathan Banks | Gary Krewson | - |
| "Waiting for Mr. Wrong" | Fernando Allende | Carols Moreno | - |
| "Waiting for Mr. Wrong" | Michael Dorn | Highway Patrolman | - |
| "Waiting for Mr. Wrong" | John Lansing | Jerry Borrell | - |
| "Waiting for Mr. Wrong" | Ada Maris | Angie Chavina | - |
| "Think Blue" | William Smith | Neville Sigerson | - |
| "Think Blue" | Alan Blumenfeld | Ziggie | Police Mechanic |
| "Think Blue" | Ramon Bieri | Charlie Coster | - |
| "Blow-Up" | Anthony James | Otto Minsky | - |
| "Blow-Up" | Bradford English | Singer | Detective |
| "Blow-Up" | John Shearin | Lt. Ambrose Finn | Detective |
| "Blow-Up" | Kate Zentall | Tiffany Reed | Defense Attorney |
| "War Zone" | Vernon Wells | Zajak | - |
| "War Zone" | Billy Drago | Le Claire | - |
| "War Zone" | Gela Nash | Leanne | - |
| "War Zone" | Don Hood | Arthur Speigal | - |
| "Burned" | Jane Russell | Ava Fontaine | - |
| "Burned" | Anthony Caruso | Nick Bartoni | - |
| "Scrap Metal" | Frank Campanella | Vinnie Brokaw | - |
| "Scrap Metal" | Joseph Cortese | Marco Brokaw | - |
| "Scrap Metal" | Kay Lenz | Alicia Fiori | - |
| "Scrap Metal" | Ji-Tu Cumbuka | Homer | - |
| "Fagin 1986" | Richard Coca | Umberto Sandoval | - |
| "Fagin 1986" | Gary Cervantes | - | - |
| "Fagin 1986" | Jacob Vargas | Emilio Morales | - |
| "Fagin 1986" | Trinidad Silva | Hector Rivas | - |
| "62 Hours of Terror" | Persis Khambatta | Dhari Ziad | - |
| "62 Hours of Terror" | Thom Christopher | Hasseb Hamza | - |
| "Death Machine" | John Matuszak | Lincoln | - |
| "Death Machine" | Karen Witter | Linda | - |
| "Death Machine" | Frank Collison | Bosco | - |
| "The Set Up" | Jack Colvin | Michael Varn | - |
| "The Set Up" | Robert O'Reilly | Willem Sunderson | - |
| "The Set Up" | James Whitmore, Jr. | Sgt. Bernie Terwilliger | Internal Affairs Sergeant |
| "The Set Up" | Conrad Dunn | Rocket | Informant |
| "The Beautiful & the Dead, pt. 1" | Dan Lauria | Broder | - |
| "The Beautiful & the Dead, pt. 1" | Kabir Bedi | Leo Zukoff | - |
| "The Beautiful & the Dead, pt. 1" | Kim Johnston Ulrich | Allison Kavaley | - |
| "The Beautiful & the Dead, pt. 1" | Andrew Massett | Sgt. Jerry Billings | San Francisco Homicide Sergeant |
| "The Beautiful & the Dead, pt. 1" | Marc McClure | Ralph Skinner | - |
| "The Beautiful & the Dead, pt. 2" | Dan Lauria | Broder | - |
| "The Beautiful & the Dead, pt. 2" | Kabir Bedi | Leo Zukoff | - |
| "The Beautiful & the Dead, pt. 2" | Kim Johnston Ulrich | Allison Kavaley | - |
| "The Beautiful & the Dead, pt. 2" | Andrew Massett | Sgt. Jerry Billings | San Francisco Homicide Sergeant |
| "The Beautiful & the Dead, pt. 2" | Marc McClure | Ralph Skinner | - |
| "The Return of Typhoon Thompson" | Isaac Hayes | Jerome 'Typhoon' Thompson | - |
| "The Return of Typhoon Thompson" | Garrett Morris | Sporty James | - |
| "The Return of Typhoon Thompson" | Sheryl Lee Ralph | Josie Clifford | - |
| "The Return of Typhoon Thompson" | Miguel Fernandes | Eddie Zbinksi | - |
| "Saturday Night Special " | Anne-Marie Johnson | Isabel Teret / Nella Watkins | - |
| "Saturday Night Special " | Beah Richards | Pockets / Ella Mae Fuller | - |

==== Season Three ====
| Episode | Actor | Character | Role |
|---|---|---|---|
| "Overnight Sensation" | Sal Lopez | Tony Melendez | - |
| "Overnight Sensation" | Michael Wren | Raul Marcado | - |
| "Overnight Sensation" | James Whitmore, Jr. | Sgt. Bernie Terwilliger | Internal Affairs Sergeant |
| "Change Partners and Dance" | Tim Thomerson | Police Sergeant Harry Traynor | - |
| "Change Partners and Dance" | Robert Firth | Detective Riley Causland | - |
| "Change Partners and Dance" | Norbert Weisser | Craig Borson | - |
| "Crime of Passion" | Ray Wise | Alex Parker | - |
| "Crime of Passion" | Candy Clark | Jody Stone | - |
| "The Castro Connection" | John Beck | Neil Jordan | - |
| "The Castro Connection" | Jack Bannon | Michael Stevens | - |
| "High Noon in L.A." | George DelHoyo | Carlos Mariano | - |
| "High Noon in L.A." | Ethan Phillips | Michael Stevens | - |
| "High Noon in L.A." | Zitto Kazann | Joey | - |
| "From San Francisco with Love" | Laura Johnson | Det. Sgt. Valerie Foster | - |
| "True Confessions" | Lauren Tewes | Sheila Burke | - |
| "Love, Hate, and Sporty James" | Claudia Christian | Sheila Burke | - |
| "Love, Hate, and Sporty James" | Jack Bannon | Michael Stevens | - |
| "The Contract" | Brent Spiner | Vaughn | - |
| "The Contract" | Peter Haskell | Roger Hennessy | - |
| "The Contract" | Katherine Moffat | Laura Hennessy | - |
| "The Contract" | Katherine Cannon | Gail Morton | - |
| "The Cradle Will Rock" | Chaka Khan | Miss Gina B | - |
| "The Cradle Will Rock" | John Hancock | Sam Pruitt | - |
| "Bad Company" | Dean Stockwell | Brother Harold Hobarts | - |
| "Bad Company" | Big John Studd | Randy | - |
| "Bad Company" | Lar Park Lincoln | Angela Holly Hobarts | - |
| "Down and Under" | Anthony LaPaglia | Woodward | - |
| "Down and Under" | Marina Sirtis | Kate Scanlon | - |
| "Straight to the Heart" | Robert Miano | Karl | - |
| "Straight to the Heart" | Lydia Cornell | Nicki Rains/Rena Farrell | - |
| "Requiem for Sergeant McCall" | Bruce Davison | Deputy Chief Wyler | - |
| "Double Exposure" | George Clooney | Matthew Winfield | - |
| "The Girl Next Door" | Stanley Kamel | Brad Wilkes, FBI | - |
| "The Girl Next Door" | Robert Firth | Detective Riley Causland | - |
| "Any Second Now" | Theresa Saldana | Jennifer Hartman | - |
| "A Child Is Born" | Leif Garrett | Todd Logan | - |
| "Crossfire" | Richard Cox | Carl Remick | - |
| "Crossfire" | Larenz Tate | Sporty's Nephew | - |
| "Crossfire" | Jack Bannon | Michael Stevens | - |
| "Hot Pursuit: Part 1" | Ji-Tu Cumbuka | Homer | - |
| "Hot Pursuit: Part 1" | Gela Nash | Vicki | - |
| "Hot Pursuit: Part 2" | Ji-Tu Cumbuka | Homer | - |
| "Hot Pursuit: Part 2" | Gela Nash | Vicki | - |
| "Shades" | Shelley Taylor Morgan | Sgt. Katherine 'Kitty' O'Hearn | - |
| "Shades" | Michael Gregory | Al | - |
| "Shades" | Jared Martin | Special Agent Ringerman | - |

==== Season Four ====
| Episode | Actor | Character | Role |
|---|---|---|---|
| "Not Just Another John Doe" | Stanley Kamel | Brad Wilkes, FBI | - |
| "Playing God" | Castulo Guerra | Luis Guerrero | - |
| "Playing God" | Jackie Gonneau | Waitress | - |
| "The Jade Woman" | Dirk Blocker | Randall Fane | - |
| "The Jade Woman" | Brent Jennings | Curtis | - |
| "The Jade Woman" | Clare Torao (credited as Clare Nono) | Rose Shan | - |
| "Flashpoint" | Beau Billingslea | Officer Bolin | - |
| "Flashpoint" | Gregory Sierra | Councilman Elandro | - |
| "Flashpoint" | Arthur Rosenberg | Commander Lester D. Cain | - |
| "Night on Bald Mountain" | Frank Ashmore | Carl Brand | - |
| "Night on Bald Mountain" | Tricia O'Neil | Sylvia Brand | - |
| "City of Passion, pt. 1" | Erik Estrada | Sgt. Bradley 'Brad' Navarro | - |
| "City of Passion, pt. 1" | Shelley Taylor Morgan | Sgt. Katherine 'Kitty' O'Hearn | |
| "City of Passion, pt. 1" | Arthur Rosenberg | Commander Lester D. Cain | - |
| "City of Passion, pt. 1" | Robert Reed | Judge Warren Unger | - |
| "City of Passion, pt. 1" | Carel Struycken | Occult Store Owner | - |
| "City of Passion, pt. 2" | Erik Estrada | Sgt. Bradley 'Brad' Navarro | - |
| "City of Passion, pt. 2" | Shelley Taylor Morgan | Sgt. Katherine 'Kitty' O'Hearn | |
| "City of Passion, pt. 2" | Arthur Rosenberg | Commander Lester D. Cain | - |
| "City of Passion, pt. 2" | Robert Reed | Judge Warren Unger | - |
| "City of Passion, pt. 3" | Erik Estrada | Sgt. Bradley 'Brad' Navarro | - |
| "City of Passion, pt. 3" | Shelley Taylor Morgan | Sgt. Katherine 'Kitty' O'Hearn | |
| "City of Passion, pt. 3" | Arthur Rosenberg | Commander Lester D. Cain | - |
| "City of Passion, pt. 3" | Robert Reed | Judge Warren Unger | - |
| "Hot Prowl" | Cindy Morgan | Carol Benson | - |
| "Hot Prowl" | Alex Rocco | Floyd Benson | - |
| "Hot Prowl" | Brett Baxter Clark | Jeffrey Bliss | - |
| "Allegra" | Tony Jay | Father Michaels | - |
| "Renegade" | Brion James | Lt. Jeff Wadsworth | - |
| "The Black Dahlia" | Ian Abercrombie | George | Butler for the Latimers |
| "The Black Dahlia" | Billie Bird | Marie Watson | - |
| "Naked Justice, Pt. 1" | Nestor Serrano | Jessie Cruz | - |
| "Naked Justice, Pt. 1" | Stanley Kamel | Brad Wilkes, FBI | - |

==== Season Five ====
| Episode | Actor | Character | Role |
|---|---|---|---|
| "City Under Siege, pt. 1" | James Sikking | Jack Small | - |
| "City Under Siege, pt. 2" | James Sikking | Jack Small | - |
| "City Under Siege, pt. 3" | James Sikking | Jack Small | - |

==== Season Six ====
| Episode | Actor | Character | Role |

==== Season Seven ====
| Episode | Actor | Character | Role |

== Revival series ==
=== Main cast ===
- Fred Dryer ... Lt. Richard "Rick" Hunter
- Stepfanie Kramer ... Sgt. Dee Dee McCall

=== Supporting cast ===
- Mike Gomez ... Capt. Roberto Gallardo
- Michelle Gold ... Off./Det. Cynthia Monetti
- Sid Sham ... Off./Det. Sid Keyes
- Meredyth Hunt ... Det. Krysta Carson (TV Movies Only) (2002–2003)
- Frank Grillo ... Det. Terence Gillette (TV Movies Only) (2002–2003)
- Kenneth Taylor ... Off. Mueller (TV Movies Only) (2002–2003)
- Robert Crow ... Off. Wilcher (TV Movies Only) (2002–2003)
- Alex Mendoza ... Det. Anthony Santiago (Series Episodes Only) (2003)
