= List of Hunter episodes =

The following is an episode list for the 1980s police television series Hunter, starring Fred Dryer and Stepfanie Kramer. In the United States, the show was aired on NBC. The "Pilot" TV movie premiered on September 18, 1984 with the series officially starting 10 days later. The show ended on April 26, 1991 after seven seasons. There are a total of 153 episodes, spanning seven years (1984–1991) of the show's run.

Reunion movies were broadcast on TV in 1995, 2002 and 2003, with a revival series of five episodes (of which only three aired) following in 2003 as well.

== Series overview ==
Season	Episodes	Originally released	
Season	Episodes	First released	Last released
1	20	September 18, 1984	May 11, 1985
2	23	September 21, 1985	May 13, 1986
3	22	September 27, 1986	July 18, 1987
4	22	September 24, 1987	May 7, 1988
5	22	October 29, 1988	May 21, 1989
6	22	October 14, 1989	May 7, 1990
7	22	September 19, 1990	April 26, 1991
TV Movies		April 30, 1995	April 12, 2003
Revival	5	April 19, 2003	May 3, 2003

== Episodes ==
=== Season 1 (1984–85) ===
No. overall	No. in season	Title	Directed by	Written by	Original release date	Prod. code	Rating/share (households)
1	1	"Hunter"	Ron Satlof	Frank Lupo	September 18, 1984	5100A	20.4/33
2	2	"Hunter"	Ron Satlof	Frank Lupo	September 18, 1984	5100B	20.4/33
Detective Sergeant Rick Hunter is the son of a mobster; who has a hard time keeping a partner because most other cops don't trust to work with him due to his rough methods. The incompetent Bernie Terwilliger (James Whitmore Jr.) is the only one in the squad who accepted to work with him. Hunter decides then to partner up with another maverick cop, "Brass Cupcake" Detective Sergeant Dee Dee McCall (Stepfanie Kramer) —against the will of 'Captain Cain' (Michael Cavanaugh)— to set the trap for a brutal serial murderer. Note: Brian Dennehy guest star in this episode as "Dr. Bolin" the appointed shrink of Hunter's detective division.
3	3	"Hard Contract"	Bruce Kessler	Stephen J. Cannell & Frank Lupo	September 28, 1984	5104	11.8/20
McCall takes an unexpected leave of absence to hunt down a renegade cop and stop him before he follows through on a killer-for-hire assignment.
4	4	"The Hot Grounder"	Bill Duke	Stephen J. Cannell	October 5, 1984	5107	11.4/19
When the Police Commissioner's wife is murdered, the commissioner becomes the prime suspect. Hunter and McCall have to investigate despite interference from the top. Guest stars Sam J. Jones.
5	5	"A Long Way from L.A."	Arnold Laven	Frank Lupo	October 26, 1984	5105	11.1/18
A pickpocket is accused of brutally beating a woman.
6	6	"Legacy"	Ron Satlof	Chris Bunch & Allan Cole	November 2, 1984	5102	9.3/15
Hunter has to find a witness that can provide testimony to stop a gang war after a gangster was murdered.
7	7	"Flight on a Dead Pigeon"	Michael Preece	E. Nick Alexander	November 9, 1984	5106	11.0/18
A young girl reports that her carrier pigeons have been stolen, but nobody takes her seriously until she becomes the target of a kidnapper.
8	8	"Pen Pals"	Larry Stewart	Babs Greyhosky	November 16, 1984	5108	11.0/18
Hunter's rough behavior while making an arrest puts him in a bad situation when the criminal is shot and killed with Hunter's gun. Note: Guest stars Billy Drago and Jack O'Halloran. First appearance by Tim Thomerson, who appeared in later episodes as different characters.
9	9	"Dead or Alive"	Guy Magar	Frank Lupo	November 30, 1984	5112	13.1/21
Hunter and McCall track a bounty hunter who is beating the outlaws he brings in for a reward. Wings Hauser and John Amos guest star. Jim Croce sings "You don't Mess Around with Jim"
10	10	"High Bleacher Man"	Arnold Laven	Sidney Ellis	December 7, 1984	5101	10.9/17
Hunter and McCall are assigned to protect a sleazy criminal, who has been given immunity for fingering a top criminal. Outraged at having to protect him, Hunter and McCall set out to find someone else who can finger the top criminal.
11	11	"The Shooter"	Michael Lange	Mark Jones	January 4, 1985	5114	10.3/15
Hunter and McCall hunt for the person who shot and killed a motorcycle cop with an armor-piercing bullet like the one that was used to kill McCall's husband. Guest stars Shawn Weatherly.
12	12	"The Garbage Man"	Bruce Kessler	Sidney Ellis	January 11, 1985	5113	10.3/15
Hunter and an old friend who's a parole officer (Ed O'Neill) get in each other's way while trying to investigate the same case. Guest stars Frances McDormand.
13	13	"The Avenging Angel"	James Whitmore, Jr.	Brian Alan Lane	January 18, 1985	5115	12.6/20
A mentally disturbed surveillance expert attempts to "help" Hunter by killing a suspect and a witness. McCall is kidnapped when the surveillance expert is unhappy that Hunter does not approve of his actions. Guest stars Nancy Stafford.
14	14	"The Snow Queen: Part 1"	Tony Mordente	Frank Lupo	March 23, 1985	5119	13.1/24
A cocaine dealer (Lycia Naff) escapes from her police escort while being extradited from New York and Hunter joins forces with NYPD detective Jackie Molinas (Dennis Franz) for a big drug bust while McCall goes undercover. Guest stars Dennis Farina.
15	15	"The Snow Queen: Part 2"	Richard A. Colla	Frank Lupo	March 30, 1985	5120	11.9/22
Hunter becomes suspicious of Molinas (Dennis Franz), his connection to the cocaine dealer he's supposed to transport back to New York.
16	16	"The Beach Boy"	Richard A. Colla	Richard Christian Matheson & Thomas E. Szollosi	April 6, 1985	5116	12.4/22
Drug dealers become the target of retribution after refusing to deal with their suppliers.
17	17	"Guilty"	Michael Lange	Mark Jones	April 13, 1985	5118	13.8/26
Hunter and McCall investigate a possible connection between two homicides, rather than follow orders to investigate a case involving muggings. Note: Ken Foree guest star in this episode as Louis McMahon.
18	18	"The Last Kill"	Bruce Kessler	Jeff Wilhelm	April 20, 1985	5111	13.6/26
Hunter and McCall track a hit man who leaves a napkin with a purple circle on it at the scene of each crime.
19	19	"Fire Man"	Tony Mordente	Richard Christian Matheson & Thomas E. Szollosi	May 4, 1985	5121	11.6/21
A television news crew get in the way of Hunter and McCall while they are trying to investigate the arsonist the news crew helped identify.
20	20	"Sniper"	James Whitmore, Jr.	Sidney Ellis	May 11, 1985	5117	12.1/22
Hunter and McCall investigate the mysterious sniper shootings of blond women. Guest stars James Cromwell.

=== Season 2 (1985–86) ===
No. overall	No. in season	Title	Directed by	Written by	Original release date	Prod. code	Rating/share (households)
21	1	"Case X"	David Soul	Tom Lazarus	September 21, 1985	5206	18.2/33
McCall goes undercover after a number of porn stars wind up dead. Guest stars Leo Rossi, Rita Taggart, and Sam Anderson.
22	2	"Night of the Dragons"	James Whitmore, Jr.	Patrick Barry & Herbert Wright	September 28, 1985	5209	14.0/25
Hunter and McCall spend their time off investigating a shooting they witnessed in Chinatown. Guest stars James Hong.
23	3	"The Biggest Man in Town"	Bob Bralver	Stephen Katz	October 5, 1985	5217	13.4/24
Hunter and McCall go undercover to investigate the murder of an accountant in a small town. Guest Stars Stuart Whitman, Don Stroud, Nana Visitor.
24	4	"Rich Girl"	James Whitmore, Jr.	Stephen L. Cotler	October 19, 1985	5210	15.2/26
Hunter and McCall investigate the attempted shooting of a wealthy businessman whose young wife is the prime suspect.
25	5	"Killer in a Halloween Mask"	Sidney Hayers	Stephen Katz	October 26, 1985	5201	13.2/22
The Captain sends Hunter and McCall to serve as technical advisors for a television police show to keep them out of trouble. Unfortunately, the star of the show is killed, placing Hunter and McCall in the middle of another high-profile murder investigation. Guest stars Jesse Ventura. Note: Acting debut for Tim Russ.
26	6	"Rape and Revenge: Part 1"	Gary Winter	Tom Lazarus	November 2, 1985	5215	14.9/26
While investigating a rape and murder at a foreign consulate, McCall finds herself the victim of the same rapist, a diplomat who escapes prosecution for the crime because of diplomatic immunity. Hunter vows to get revenge. Guest Star Richard Yniguez
27	7	"Rape and Revenge: Part 2"	Richard A. Colla	Tom Lazarus	November 9, 1985	5218	13.6/23
Hunter takes matters into his own hands after his superiors refuse to fight the diplomat's claim of immunity. After learning of Hunter's intentions, McCall tracks her partner down to talk him out of his plan. Guest Stars Richard Yniguez, Danny Ponce, Michael Ansara, Larry Hankin, Sam Vlahos, Jack Starrett. Follow up of this episode is "High Noon in L.A." (S03E05).
28	8	"Million Dollar Misunderstanding"	Michael Preece	Frank Lupo	November 16, 1985	5212	17.5/29
An armored car robbery goes awry when the gang leader (Robert Davi) kills his partner, and the car with the money in the trunk is stolen. Guest stars Robert Davi, Robert Englund, Phil Rubenstein, Christie Claridge, Jack Anderozzi, Pamela Brull, James Crittenden, Maurice Sneed.
29	9	"The Big Fall"	James Whitmore, Jr.	Rogers Turrentine	November 23, 1985	5216	16.2/27
Hunter is blamed for the murder of a government witness that he and McCall were assigned to protect. Guest Stars Jonathan Banks, Mills Watson, Vic Polizos, Richard Foronjy, Patti Tippo, Lou Felder,.
30	10	"Waiting for Mr. Wrong"	Ron Satlof	Rogers Turrentine	December 7, 1985	5219	16.8/30
A flashy yet deadly jewelry store robbery leaves Hunter and McCall with a dead body and a cold trail. Guest Stars Ada Maris, Fernando Allende, John Lansing, Steven Peterman.
31	11	"Think Blue"	Michael O'Herlihy	Sidney Ellis	December 14, 1985	5214	15.7/27
A friend of Hunter's is accused of killing his wife, but Hunter connects the crime to a man he arrested a long time ago instead. Guest Star William Smith.
32	12	"Blow-Up"	Douglas Heyes	Herbert Wright	January 4, 1986	5203	17.1/28
Hunter suspects that a man he arrested a long time ago (Anthony James) bombed the angel on a grave.
33	13	"War Zone"	Bob Bralver	Allison Hock	January 11, 1986	5207	15.8/27
The murder of a hooker is connected to a pharmaceutical theft. Guest Stars Vernon Wells, Billy Drago, Gela Nash.
34	14	"Burned"	Charlie Picerni	Jo Montgomery	January 18, 1986	5221	18.4/31
A lawyer is indicted for bribing a juror and fakes his death. Guest stars Jane Russell, Anthony Caruso, Victoria Bass, George McDaniel, John Shearin, Peter Hobbs, Branscombe Richmond, Richard Beauchamp. Note: Last on-screen appearance of Jane Russell.
35	15	"Scrap Metal"	Michael Preece	Sidney Ellis	February 1, 1986	5220	14.2/25
A dying criminal sends for Hunter and says that he's the man who killed Hunter's father, and that he was paid to do it by his father's partner. Hunter goes to the man who was originally convicted for the murder and asks him if he did it or not; he says he was just trying to rob the place when the police came and assumed he did it. So Hunter sets out to find if his father's partner did have his father killed. Guest Star Kay Lenz.
36	16	"Fagin 1986"	Douglas Heyes	Randall Wallace	February 8, 1986	5224	14.6/25
A juvenile is killed during a robbery attempt and Hunter discovers that he was part of a gang led by an adult criminal (Trinidad Silva).
37	17	"62 Hrs. of Terror"	Michael Preece	S : Richard Breen & James Polster; T : Rudolph Borchert & Rogers Turrentine	February 15, 1986	5213	14.6/25
Hunter and McCall discover a network of extremists who are holding a diplomat hostage. Guest stars Persis Khambatta.
38	18	"Death Machine"	Kim Manners	Tom Lazarus	March 11, 1986	5225	14.7/22
Hunter and McCall pursue a couple of young punks involved in a jewelry heist and an underground punk rocker (John Matuszak) suspected of multiple torture murders.
39	19	"The Setup"	James Whitmore, Jr.	Allison Hock	March 25, 1986	5223	18.1/29
Hunter recognizes a murder victim as the mistress of the man who was suspected of murdering his partner three years ago.
40	20	"The Beautiful & the Dead: Part 1"	Gary Winter	S : Jo Montgomery; T : John Thomas James	April 1, 1986	5226	16.0/25
A body disappears from Hunter's apartment, and as he and McCall investigate they find that a Russian defector and Federal agents are connected to the case.
41	21	"The Beautiful & the Dead: Part 2"	Tony Mordente	S : Jo Montgomery; T : John Thomas James	April 8, 1986	5229	16.2/25
See Part 1, above.
42	22	"The Return of Typhoon Thompson"	Peter Kiwitt	Rogers Turrentine	May 6, 1986	5227	13.1/20
Hunter and McCall try to stop a former prizefighter (Isaac Hayes) from exacting revenge on those who framed him for the murder of his manager. Note: This episode marks the first appearance of informant Sporty James (Garrett Morris), who would appear in a total of 28 episodes.
43	23	"Saturday Night Special"	Peter Kiwitt	Marianne Clarkson & Allison Hock	May 13, 1986	5202	14.4/22
Hunter and McCall investigate a witness' claim that a series of skid row murders are being committed by the reporter (Anne-Marie Johnson) who is covering the story. Note: First appearance of Pockets (Beah Richards), a friendly vagrant.

=== Season 3 (1986–87) ===
No. overall	No. in season	Title	Directed by	Written by	Original release date	Prod. code	Rating/share (households)
44	1	"Overnight Sensation"	Tony Mordente	Richard C. Okie	September 27, 1986	5306	17.5/33
A television reporter accuses Hunter of firing his weapon unnecessarily after pursuing two robbers. Note: Final appearance of Bernie Terwilliger (James Whitmore Jr.) and first appearance of Charlie Devane (Charles Hallahan).
45	2	"Change Partners and Dance"	James Whitmore, Jr.	David Lightstone	October 4, 1986	5308	18.2/33
A cop is murdered after making arrangements to meet with Hunter. Hunter and McCall are partnered with different partners on Devane's orders, leaving McCall and her new partner to work on the murder. Note: Second appearance of Tim Thomerson.
46	3	"Crime of Passion"	Charlie Picerni	Story by : Jo Montgomery; Teleplay by : Doug Heyes Jr.	October 11, 1986	5310	19.3/35
McCall believes that a man suspected of murdering his wife (Ray Wise) is innocent. Guest stars Candy Clark.
47	4	"The Castro Connection"	James L. Conway	Carlton Hollander & Dennis Rodriguez and Doug Heyes Jr.	November 1, 1986	5312	14.7/27
Hunter witnesses the shooting of a DEA agent, but the body disappears.
48	5	"High Noon in L.A."	James Whitmore, Jr.	Story by : Erica Byrne; Teleplay by : Howard Chesley	November 8, 1986	5314	16.4/30
The brother (George DelHoyo) of the diplomat who raped McCall (in the two-part episode "Rape and Revenge") comes to Los Angeles to exact revenge against Hunter for killing his brother. Follow up of episodes "Rape and Revenge Part 1" (S02E06) & "Rape and Revenge Part 2" (S02E07)
49	6	"From San Francisco with Love"	Charlie Picerni	S : Ira Besserman & Chris Burrenthal; T : Stephanie Garman & Hollace White	November 15, 1986	5305	18.3/33
A San Francisco cop (Laura Johnson) joins Hunter and McCall in investigating a case after someone attempts to shoot a deceased millionaire's son. Guest stars Philece Sampler.
50	7	"True Confessions"	Michael Preece	Story by : Jo Montgomery; Teleplay by : Rogers Turrentine	November 22, 1986	5316	16.9/30
When the three men guilty of raping a young woman are released on a technicality, her older sister (Lauren Tewes) vows to make them pay for their crime.
51	8	"Love, Hate and Sporty James"	Don Chaffey	Marianne Clarkson	December 6, 1986	5309	16.9/30
Police informant Sporty James (Garrett Morris) believes that he will receive a large sum of money after witnessing a murder committed by a drug trafficker's henchmen. Guest stars Claudia Christian. Follow up of this episode is "The Bogota Million" (S04E017).
52	9	"The Contract"	Les Sheldon	Paul L. Ehrmann & John Thomas James	December 13, 1986	5307	16.9/30
The wife of a wealthy man and her lover plan her kidnapping to swindle her husband (Peter Haskell). Guest stars Katherine Cannon and Brent Spiner.
53	10	"The Cradle Will Rock"	Kim Manners	S : E. Nick Alexander; T : Rogers Turrentine; S/T : John Thomas James	January 3, 1987	5301	17.8/31
McCall's friend and the rock star ex-husband of a singer vanish. Guest stars Chaka Khan and John Hancock.
54	11	"Bad Company"	Charlie Picerni	Dick Nelson	January 10, 1987	5304	15.5/27
A group of neo-Nazis rob a gun shop and leave an injured partner (Lar Park Lincoln) behind, who happens to be the daughter of the group's leader. Dean Stockwell and wrestler Big John Studd guest stars.
55	12	"Down and Under"	James Darren	S : John Thomas James & Charlotte Clay; T : Howard Chesley	January 17, 1987	5318	16.0/28
Hunter travels to Sydney, Australia in an attempt to find clues regarding both the murder of an elderly woman and the disappearance of an old flame three years ago. Guest stars Marina Sirtis and Anthony LaPaglia.
56	13	"Straight to the Heart"	James Whitmore, Jr.	T : John Thomas James; S/T : Michael Berlin & Eric Estrin	January 24, 1987	5315	17.6/30
While Hunter is on leave preparing to testify before a grand jury, he becomes involved with a woman (Lydia Cornell) who is the girlfriend of the accused.
57	14	"Requiem for Sergeant McCall"	Charlie Picerni	Joe Cannon & Doug Heyes Jr.	February 7, 1987	5311	15.8/28
McCall lands in hot water after she reopens the case her husband was working on when he was killed. This episode retcons the death of McCall's husband from the pilot episode. Guest stars Leslie Hope and Cesare Danova.
58	15	"Double Exposure"	James Whitmore, Jr.	Thomas Huggins & Charlotte Clay	February 14, 1987	5324	15.6/28
McCall goes undercover as a fashion model to bust a ring of thieves hitting lonely business men in their hotels. When Sporty James shows up and inadvertently blows McCall's cover, Hunter attempts to get there in time to keep them from getting killed. Guest stars George Clooney.
59	16	"The Girl Next Door"	James Whitmore, Jr.	Charlotte Clay & Thomas Huggins	February 21, 1987	5326	15.7/29
Detective Riley Causland is on the run after witnessing his girlfriend's murder and planting evidence of the crime in Hunter's house.
60	17	"Any Second Now"	James Darren	S : Charlotte Clay & John Thomas James; T : Stephanie Garman & Hollace White and Marianne Clarkson	February 28, 1987	5320	17.8/32
A fan who was convicted of attacking a pianist is released from prison and is once again a threat to the pianist. Note: The pianist in this episode is played by real-life stalking victim Theresa Saldana, and the story is similar to her own.
61	18	"A Child Is Born"	Fred Dryer	T : Marianne Clarkson & Janice Meyer; S/T : Erica Byrne	March 14, 1987	5327	16.9/30
McCall wants to adopt a baby girl whose mother was shot and left brain dead in a case of mistaken identity.
62	19	"Crossfire"	Charlie Picerni	T : Terry Nelson & John Thomas James; S/T : Herman Groves	April 11, 1987	5319	15.1/27
Hunter finds that an old girlfriend is being hunted by a cocaine dealer while he is tailing a robbery and murder suspect who was released due to a lack of evidence.
63	20	"Hot Pursuit: Part 1"	James Darren	Charlotte Clay & Thomas Huggins	May 2, 1987	5330	14.0/27
Hunter and McCall are investigating a prostitution ring when McCall is shot and seriously wounded, and her informant friend is killed. The trail soon leads to a pimp named Big Jack Hemmings (Robert Ridgely), who Hunter suspects ordered the hit on McCall. While McCall fights to survive as surgeons prepare to take the bullet out, Hunter confronts Hemmings.
64	21	"Hot Pursuit: Part 2"	Stepfanie Kramer	Charlotte Clay & Thomas Huggins	May 9, 1987	5328	14.4/27
After Hunter leaves Hemmings' mansion, he's arrested by the Beverly Hills police, who are trying to pin a murder charge on Hunter for political reasons. The D.A. decides not to charge Hunter yet, and Hunter soon discovers who the real killer is. It's now a race against time, as Hunter tries to stop the killer from fleeing the country while the Beverly Hills police try to pin the crime on Hunter.
65	22	"Shades"	Michael Preece	Frank Lupo	July 18, 1987	5329	14.3/30
Hunter is kidnapped and presumed dead after he travels to prison to visit a sick family friend. McCall must control her frustration when she is paired up with a fashion-conscious female partner Kitty O'Hearn (Shelley Taylor Morgan). Guest Star Jared Martin.

=== Season 4 (1987–88) ===
No. overall	No. in season	Title	Directed by	Written by	Original release date	Prod. code	Rating/share (households)
66	1	"Not Just Another John Doe"	Michael Preece	Doug Heyes Jr.	September 24, 1987	5412	N/A
A skid row murder leads to an unknown victim. The killer and the witness both know each other's identities. Guest Star Beah Richards.
67	2	"Playing God"	James Whitmore, Jr.	Richard C. Okie	October 3, 1987	5405	17.0/34
Hunter and McCall consider leaving the force when the investigation of the murder of a community leader who has ties to organized crime reveals some disturbing evidence.
68	3	"The Jade Woman"	Fred Dryer	Joe Menosky	October 17, 1987	5407	16.3/31
Hunter investigates the disappearance of a friend's mail-order bride while he is off duty. The case becomes a homicide investigation when the marriage broker is murdered. Guest Stars James Wainwright, Dirk Blocker.
69	4	"Flashpoint"	Michael Preece	Dallas L. Barnes	October 24, 1987	5408	18.3/36
A Hispanic city councilman's son is killed in a botched traffic stop and he holds the LAPD responsible, citing racism. Guest Star Deborah Pratt. Based on the novel See the Woman by Dallas Barnes.
70	5	"Night on Bald Mountain"	Dennis Dugan	S : John Thomas James; T : Marianne Clarkson	October 31, 1987	5402	16.0/31
When Hunter and McCall travel to a mountaintop mansion to investigate a murder, they are trapped there overnight with the victim's entire family in the midst of a massive snowstorm.
71	6	"City of Passion: Part 1"	James Whitmore, Jr.	Charlotte Clay & Thomas Huggins	November 7, 1987	5415	17.3/34
Several different stories mesh together in this three-part episode. Hunter and McCall, along with Detectives Brad Navarro (Erik Estrada) and Kitty O'Hearn (Shelley Taylor Morgan), investigate a string of rapes committed against a certain type of female. McCall is accused of entrapment when she busts a prominent judge (Robert Reed) in a prostitution sting operation. Hunter receives a visit from a teenage prostitute who is concerned her missing friend was murdered. Based on the novel of the same name by Dallas Barnes.
72	7	"City of Passion: Part 2"	James Whitmore, Jr.	Dallas L. Barnes	November 14, 1987	5416	18.0/35
Hunter spends the night at McCall's house after she receives a threatening phone call from the man known as "Bigfoot," whom they were investigating for the rapes. Brad Navarro's wife kicks him out of the house and hits the LAPD with a massive and somewhat humorous lawsuit, claiming their marriage was failing because of Brad's "unusual appetite for sex" due to being paired up with attractive female partners. Hunter's investigation of a missing girl uncovers a local satanic cult, led by the very judge McCall arrested. The LAPD conduct a stakeout in an attempt to catch "Bigfoot," but he outsmarts them and nearly claims Sgt. McCall as his next victim.
73	8	"City of Passion: Part 3"	James Whitmore, Jr.	Dallas L. Barnes	November 21, 1987	5417	18.3/35
McCall's fight to appeal her entrapment accusation uncovers corruption at the hands of the LAPD commander, who resigns amid the controversy. The teenage girl Hunter had been keeping tabs on is murdered by a member of Judge Unger's cult. The judge is arrested by Hunter. Kathy Navarro drops her lawsuit against the LAPD and she and Brad reconcile. Lloyd Fredericks, known as "Bigfoot," is arrested after he beats and nearly rapes Sgt. McCall; Mrs. Fredericks takes her own course of action against him. Guest Star Robert Colbert.
74	9	"Turning Point"	Dennis Dugan	S : Paul Schiffer; T : Robert Bielak	November 28, 1987	5410	17.7/34
Hunter and McCall investigate a car bomb that explodes in a reporter's car, killing someone else. Guest Stars Jon Cypher, Valerie Wildman, Rudy Ramos.
75	10	"Hot Prowl"	Jefferson Kibbee	T : Joe Menosky; S/T : Joseph Gunn	December 8, 1987	5419	14.6/23
The victim of a robbery (Cindy Morgan) attempts to buy the stolen item from the robber without reporting him to the police.: Filming dates: October 6–14, 1987
76	11	"Allegra"	James Whitmore, Jr.	Joe Menosky	December 29, 1987	5420	16.4/26
Hunter struggles with some emotions when the victim of his latest murder investigation is an old flame. Guest Stars Kim Morgan Greene, Tony Jay, Michael DeLano, Rudy Ramos, Marisa Redanty, Anne Belamy, Perry Cook.
77	12	"Renegade"	Jefferson Kibbee	T : Terry D. Nelson; S/T : Frank Dandridge	January 5, 1988	5404	16.5/25
The mother of a man who steals a cocaine delivery is accidentally shot when the thief leads his pursuers to his parents' home. Guest Star James McEachin, Brion James, Pepe Serna, Rudy Ramos, Kevin Best.
78	13	"The Black Dahlia"	Michael Preece	Michael Hamner & Robert Hamner	January 12, 1988	5401	17.4/26
Hunter and McCall post a (fictitious) conclusion to the Black Dahlia murder case, the most famous unsolved murder in the history of the LAPD. Guest Stars Lawrence Tierney, Jeanette Nolan, Macon McCalman, Billie Bird, Logan Ramsey, Ian Abercrombie, Rudy Ramos, John Finnegan, Jessica Lee Nelson.
79	14	"Naked Justice: Part 1"	James Whitmore, Jr.	Dallas L. Barnes & JoAnne Barnes	February 2, 1988	5423	15.0/22
A homeless man offers information about the murder of a film star. Based on the novel of the same name by Dallas Barnes.
80	15	"Naked Justice: Part 2"	James Whitmore, Jr.	Dallas L. Barnes & JoAnne Barnes	February 9, 1988	5424	13.4/20
See Part 1, above.
81	16	"Girl on the Beach"	Fred Dryer	Doug Heyes Jr.	February 16, 1988	5422	13.5/20
Captain Devane's ex-wife Sarah is convinced that she killed a woman while driving under the influence of alcohol, the car with the body in it disappears, only for the body to turn up on the beach. Later, Sarah is killed..... Guest Stars Vincent Baggetta.
82	17	"The Bogota Million"	Michael Preece	Jo Montgomery	March 1, 1988	5409	15.4/23
The mobsters are pursuing Sporty James because they think he stole a million dollars from them. The police are pursuing him because they think he killed one of the mobsters. Follow up of episode "Love, Hate and Sporty James" (S03E08).
83	18	"Death Signs"	James Whitmore, Jr.	Charlotte Huggins & Thomas Huggins	March 12, 1988	5425	17.4/32
Hunter and McCall have three suspects to choose from when a deaf man is murdered.
84	19	"Boomerang"	Jefferson Kibbee	Jo Montgomery	March 19, 1988	5421	16.3/31
A woman (Wendie Malick) fears that she will be the prime suspect when her wealthy husband is killed in a boating accident.
85	20	"The Fourth Man"	John Peter Kousakis	S : Thomas C. Schiffer; T : Joe Menosky & Rogers Turrentine	March 26, 1988	5414	14.1/27
Hunter's old partner is murdered and he suspects that a group of officers, who were suspected of stealing money from a drug bust five years prior to the murder, are to blame. Guest Stars Leon Rippy, Robert Colbert.
86	21	"Murder He Wrote"	Jefferson Kibbee	Roy Huggins	April 30, 1988	5403	16.2/30
Hunter and McCall have dinner with a millionaire (Efrem Zimbalist, Jr.) who thinks that his heirs are plotting his murder.
87	22	"Silver Bullet"	Michael Preece	Dallas L. Barnes & JoAnne Barnes	May 7, 1988	5426	16.3/32
When Hunter and McCall investigate a series of murders committed with police-issued bullets, the main suspect is closer than they think. Guest stars Leslie Bevis. Last episode executive produced by Roy Huggins. Based on the novel Deadly Justice by Dallas Barnes.

=== Season 5 (1988–89) ===
No. overall	No. in season	Title	Directed by	Written by	Original release date	Prod. code	Viewers (millions)
88	1	"Heir of Neglect"	Alexander Singer	David Lightstone	October 29, 1988	5501	25.9
Hunter investigates the case of a teenage boy (Chad Allen) who mistakenly shot his parents during what he claimed was a home invasion.
89	2	"The Baby Game"	James Fargo	Tom Chehak	November 5, 1988	5510	27.6
A two-year-old girl sleeps while her mother is murdered.
90	3	"Dead on Target: Part 1"	Corey Allen	George Geiger	November 12, 1988	5506	23.1
Several Veterans from Hunter's squad in Vietnam are murdered during the search for emeralds that were brought back to the United States when they returned from their tour of duty. Guest Stars Gary Frank, John Bennett Perry, Michael Bell, Clare Nono, Patrick Bishop, Mario Roccuzzo, Jesse Welles, Tom Biener, Carol Swarbrick.
91	4	"Dead on Target: Part 2"	Corey Allen	George Geiger	November 19, 1988	5507	23.5
See Part 1, above.
92	5	"Presumed Guilty"	Alexander Singer	Joe Menosky	November 26, 1988	5508	26.2
McCall's current boyfriend disagrees with Hunter's belief that a suspect is guilty of burglary but not murder. Guest Star Dack Rambo.
93	6	"No Good Deed Ever Goes Unpunished"	Tony Mordente	Whitney Wherrett Roberson	December 3, 1988	5503	25.5
An anonymous tip leads McCall to believe that an explosion in her art class was an attempt to kill a murder witness.
94	7	"Honorable Profession"	Michael O'Herlihy	Fred McKnight	December 10, 1988	5512	26.0
Hunter puts his job on the line when he defends a female officer, critically wounded in the line of duty, against accusations of employing improper procedures during a Chinatown shooting. Guest Star William Smith and James Hong. Note: Third and last appearance by Tim Thomerson.
95	8	"Payback"	Alexander Singer	Lee Maddux	December 17, 1988	5502	23.0
A bank robber turns to Hunter for a favor once he learns that the bank he robbed is owned by the mob.
96	9	"Partners"	James Fargo	Terry D. Nelson	January 7, 1989	5514	28.0
Hunter and McCall investigate the murder of an Immigration Agent, who was the husband of one of their fellow LAPD officers.
97	10	"The Pit"	Randy Roberts	Joe Menosky	January 14, 1989	5518	29.1
A police dispatcher is pressured to assist robbers because her son is indebted to loan sharks due to his gambling. Guest Star Christopher Stone.
98	11	"City Under Siege: Part 1"	James Fargo	S : George Geiger & Tom Chehak; T : Joe Menosky	February 4, 1989	5515	30.5
A police task force is established to assist in crime control. A Bonnie and Clyde style couple arrive in LA on a violent spree. McCall goes undercover in a school when a teacher is murdered. Guest stars Robert Vaughn, James Sikking, Cec Verrell and then LAPD chief Daryl Gates.
99	12	"City Under Siege: Part 2"	Jefferson Kibbee	S : George Geiger & Tom Chehak; T : Terry D. Nelson	February 11, 1989	5516	30.1
See Part 1, above.: Filming dates: January 12–19, 1989
100	13	"City Under Siege: Part 3"	James Fargo	S : George Geiger & Tom Chehak; T : Fred McKnight	February 18, 1989	5517	30.0
See Part 1, above.
101	14	"Me, Myself & Die"	Jefferson Kibbee	David G.B. Brown	February 25, 1989	5504	28.3
A woman is the prime suspect in a brutal murder case after she stops taking her experimental medication. Guest Stars John Harkins, Angela Paton.: Filming dates: January 31-February 7, 1989
102	15	"Informant"	James Whitmore, Jr.	Tom Chehak	March 18, 1989	5519	25.9
When a convicted murderer (Henry Brown) is let out on bail pending a new trial in which he intends to defend himself, Hunter puts his career at risk to protect the identity of the informant (Clare Wren) to whom he had promised anonymity seven years earlier.
103	16	"Blood Line"	Michael Preece	Richard Raskind	April 1, 1989	5505	27.5
A suspect is poisoned while Hunter and McCall are investigating a race horse groom's death. They attempt to unravel the revenge and fraud behind the murder in order to find a motive. Guest stars Amy Benedict and Charles Bateman.
104	17	"Shoot to Kill"	Tony Mordente	Terry D. Nelson	April 8, 1989	5524	26.5
McCall is suspected of having shot an innocent man during a shootout in an alley and fights to clear her name with help from Hunter and Sporty James. While helping McCall, they discover a ring of jewel thieves.
105	18	"Code 3"	Michael Preece	Van Gordon Sauter & David Percelay	April 15, 1989	5521	25.7
When a nurse she recently befriended is killed in a car accident related to alcohol just a few days later, McCall suspects foul play. She is even more convinced of that after learning the nurse was pregnant, and would not have mixed alcohol with the morning sickness medication she was taking.
106	19	"Ring of Honor"	Fred Dryer	Asher Brauner	April 29, 1989	5525	24.1
Boxing turns deadly when the manager of promising fighter Sonny Ruiz (Scott Colomby) and a doctor are both murdered. Hunter to penetrates the world of prizefighting with the help of a trainer named Benny Shaffer (Sammy Davis Jr.). Note: Second last on-screen appearance of Sammy Davis Jr. Final appearance of Sporty James in the series.
107	20	"Teen Dreams"	David G. Phinney	Tom Chehak	May 6, 1989	5523	28.7
Prostitutes are being murdered by a man who lures them disguised as a police officer. When McCall's friend Debbie Small (from the "City Under Siege" saga) returns to the profession, she may be the next target.
108	21	"Last Run"	James Whitmore, Jr.	Fred McKnight	May 13, 1989	5526	25.9
Hunter and McCall try to rescue an undercover female agent who was kidnapped during an investigation into money laundering, and have to deal with interference from the girl's father, who's a cop himself.
109	22	"Return of White Cloud"	Stepfanie Kramer	Joe Menosky & Stepfanie Kramer & Erin Conroy	May 21, 1989	5522	10.7
Hunter and McCall investigate the murder of an art gallery owner involved in illegal sales of Native American artifacts, and find themselves drawn into a mysterious world of Native American politics.

=== Season 6 (1989–90) ===
No. overall	No. in season	Title	Directed by	Written by	Original release date	Prod. code	Viewers (millions)
110	1	"On Air"	Tony Mordente	Lee Goldberg & William Rabkin	October 14, 1989	5602	24.1
A radio show host (Erin Gray) is being stalked and the men in her life are being murdered. Hunter pretends to be her lover in order to catch the killer.
111	2	"Shillelagh"	David G. Phinney	Jeremy Lew	October 21, 1989	5604	22.7
Devane's girlfriend's (Fionnula Flanagan) brother makes a highly publicized visit from Ireland, which is soon discovered to be an assassination plot.
112	3	"Investment in Death"	Corey Allen	Nick Gore & Jerry Jacobius	October 28, 1989	5603	24.0
After leaving a gang, the former member is the victim of a drive-by shooting.
113	4	"A Girl Named Hunter"	Dennis Donnelly	Catherine Clinch	November 4, 1989	5605	23.2
Hunter delivers a baby for Cheryl Donavan (Allison Smith), a runaway from San Diego, who decides to name her girl after him. When Cheryl winds up dead, Hunter uncovers a baby-breeding operation that sells infants as though they were property. Guest stars Mary Elizabeth McDonough and Elizabeth Ashley.
114	5	"The Legion: Part 1"	Corey Allen	Marvin Kupfer	November 11, 1989	5610	23.5
Hunter and McCall must track down the leader of the White Supremacists (Richard Lynch) after he escapes from prison. Problems arise when a friend of McCall's, her former training officer (Claude Akins), tries to help and is charged with obstruction of justice. McCall tries to help him overcome his depression over his loneliness, but she is not able to help in time to prevent his suicide. Guest stars: Ken Foree (Roger Rockmore on Kenan & Kel and Peter Washington in Dawn of the Dead.)
115	6	"The Legion: Part 2"	Corey Allen	David H. Balkan	November 18, 1989	5612	23.3
Overcome with guilt over the suicide of her training officer, McCall quits the force and is kidnapped. Hunter sets out to rescue her before it's too late.
116	7	"Yesterday's Child"	Winrich Kolbe	Lee Maddux	November 25, 1989	5601	23.8
Hunter thinks a Vietnamese-American teenager may be his son, and believes the boy when he claims to be an innocent bystander during a car theft that results in a murder. Guest stars Soon-Tek Oh.
117	8	"Shield of Honor"	James Darren	Leonard Mlodinow & Scott Rubenstein	December 2, 1989	5608	22.9
A man is robbing and murdering businessmen when they are taking receipts to the bank. The incompetent rookie assigned to work with Hunter on the case is the son of Hunter's training officer.
118	9	"The Fifth Victim"	Michael Preece	Kevin Droney	December 9, 1989	5609	22.9
Hunter and McCall track down a departmental leak in the investigation of a serial killer targeting homosexuals. A local painter (Michael Champion) confesses to committing all but one of the murders.
119	10	"Brotherly Love"	James Fargo	Terry D. Nelson	January 6, 1990	5613	25.2
A young drug user (Tim Griffin) who accidentally murders his pusher and then steals $200,000 in mob money from him is pursued by the pushers' drug supplier; the user's brother (Mark Pellegrino) tries to save him. Guest stars Gretchen Corbett.
120	11	"The Nightmare"	James Whitmore, Jr.	Terry D. Nelson	January 13, 1990	5616	23.7
McCall returns home to find her young Latino cleaning lady murdered. Old scars on the young woman's body reveal that she was a torture victim. Guest stars Carlos Carrasco, BarBara Luna, and Kamala Lopez.
121	12	"Broken Dreams"	Michael Preece	S : Mark Lisson & David H. Balkan; T : Terry D. Nelson & Kevin Droney	January 27, 1990	5617	25.0
Hunter attempts to protect his high school sweetheart (Cristina Raines) after she witnesses a murder. Her unemployed husband convinces her to take part in blackmail instead of cooperating with Hunter.
122	13	"Son and Heir"	Winrich Kolbe	Kevin Droney	February 3, 1990	5615	21.7
Hunter's investigation of a murdered cop reveals that the victim was the illegitimate son of a Mafia boss (Jerry Orbach) and that the killer was the man's brother.
123	14	"Unacceptable Loss"	Corey Allen	Catherine Clinch	February 10, 1990	5614	20.7
A child is dead after inhaling fumes from illegally dumped cyanide, and Hunter and McCall work to charge a chemical company with second degree murder. Guest stars Robert Gentry and Kathleen Noone.
124	15	"Unfinished Business"	Corey Allen	Morgan Gendel	February 24, 1990	5618	25.3
Hunter and McCall have unresolved issues with regard to their previous love affair when Hunter's former co-worker is assigned to help with the investigation of a robber turned murderer.
125	16	"Lullaby"	Corey Allen	S : Terry D. Nelson & Kevin Droney; T : Marvin Kupfer & David H. Balkan	March 3, 1990	5619	24.4
Hunter and McCall work with a Scotland Yard inspector (Rosalyn Landor) when the murder of two British prostitutes resembles a string of similar murders in the United Kingdom. Guest stars Gary Sinise.
126	17	"Final Confession"	Tony Mordente	Terry D. Nelson	March 17, 1990	5620	19.3
Hunter and McCall suspect that two murders were committed as an act of revenge by a man who was recently paroled. They become frustrated when they discover that a Catholic priest knows the identity of the killer, but refuses to break his vow of confession and tell them who it is.
127	18	"Blind Ambition"	Michael Preece	Marvin Kupfer & Mark Lisson	March 31, 1990	5622	19.5
McCall and her boyfriend, a judge (John Beck), are held captive in his house by the brother (Harold Sylvester) of a man whom the judge convicted and who had committed suicide in prison.
128	19	"Sudden Withdrawal"	Tony Mordente	Kevin Droney & Terry D. Nelson	April 16, 1990	5621	19.0
Hunter and McCall suspect that a bank manager is part of two bank robberies. Guest stars Leslie Bevis.
129	20	"Second Sight"	Winrich Kolbe	Daniel Chodos & Michael Kerwin	April 23, 1990	5623	18.5
A man (Tom Villard) claims to have seen two murders in psychic visions. Hunter and McCall are skeptical until he proclaims that McCall is the next victim.
130	21	"Street Wise: Part 1"	James Whitmore, Jr.	Kevin Droney & Mark Lisson	April 30, 1990	5624	20.7
McCall leaves the police force after rekindling a romance with an old flame. Hunter investigates a thief who is terrorizing homeless veterans.
131	22	"Street Wise: Part 2"	Winrich Kolbe	David H. Balkan	May 7, 1990	5625	19.5
See Part 1, above.

=== Season 7 (1990–91) ===
No. overall	No. in season	Title	Directed by	Written by	Original release date	Prod. code	Viewers (millions)
132	1	"Deadly Encounters: Part 1"	Winrich Kolbe	Terry D. Nelson	September 19, 1990	5701	18.1
Hunter teams with two Metro officers, one of whom is a former adversary, to locate the missing profits of a murdered black-marketeer, as Devane considers a post in Metro. Guest stars Andreas Katsulas.
133	2	"Deadly Encounters: Part 2"	Winrich Kolbe	Terry D. Nelson	September 26, 1990	5702	17.5
See Part 1, above.
134	3	"Where Echoes End"	James Darren	Walter Brough	October 3, 1990	5705	15.7
A late report made by an undercover officer who witnesses the murder of a Treasury Agent arouses suspicion.
135	4	"Kill Zone"	Corey Allen	Kevin Droney	October 10, 1990	5704	20.3
Molenski is reminded of painful events while investigating a series of murder cases in which the victims were also raped.
136	5	"The Incident"	Fred Dryer	Kathy McCormick	October 24, 1990	5703	18.8
An innocent African American teenager is beaten when vigilante crimes cause friction between the police, the press, and a neighborhood watch group. Guest stars Mitch Pileggi.
137	6	"A Snitch'll Break Your Heart"	Tony Mordente	Jeff Benjamin	October 31, 1990	5706	18.5
Hunter investigates the murder of a child, and Molenski fights to save a snitch.
138	7	"Oh, the Shark Bites!"	Peter Crane	Simon Muntner	November 7, 1990	5707	18.8
Charlie Devane risks his career to protect his father's reputation after his father's name turns up on a murdered mob accountant's "debtors" list.
139	8	"The Usual Suspects"	Alan Myerson	Deborah R. Baron	November 14, 1990	5708	17.0
An office worker in the District Attorney's office alters computer records of criminals arrested the previous evening. Guest stars Jesse Ventura.
140	9	"This Is My Gun"	Winrich Kolbe	Robert Vincent O'Neill	November 28, 1990	5710	11.4
Molenski's gun is stolen and used in a robbery that leads to murder.
141	10	"La Familia"	Tony Mordente	Walter Brough	December 5, 1990	5709	20.3
A mobster is pressured by his father to remain in the family business after he returns home from prison.
142	11	"Acapulco Holiday"	Tony Mordente	Jeff Benjamin	December 12, 1990	5711	19.4
The companion of a former film star (Nina Foch) turns to a life of crime in order to grant her wish to see the Acapulco beach in the moonlight. Hunter and the city are sued by a suspect who was mistakenly arrested.
143	12	"Fatal Obsession"	Corey Allen & Winrich Kolbe	David H. Balkan	January 9, 1991	5712	23.2
144	13	"Fatal Obsession"	Corey Allen & Winrich Kolbe	Terry D. Nelson	January 9, 1991	5713	23.2
A former girlfriend complicates Hunter's investigation of a string of campus murders while Molenski becomes the target of a cop-killer. Hunter tracks down a cop-killer. Guest stars Jeffrey Combs and Frances Bay. Note: Final appearance of Darlanne Fluegel as Joanne Molenski, and first appearance of Lauren Lane as Chris Novak.
145	14	"Under Suspicion"	Gus Trikonis	Daniel Chodos	January 23, 1991	5715	14.9
Hunter searches for a missing witness while Novak seeks assistance from a computer expert to locate burglars. Guest stars Brion James.
146	15	"The Reporter"	Corey Allen	Simon Muntner	January 30, 1991	5714	16.5
Novak investigates several robberies and discovers that her reporter friend (Kelly Curtis) is using cocaine.
147	16	"Room Service"	Peter Crane	Terry D. Nelson	February 13, 1991	5716	16.8
A man and woman lure their victims to a hotel room where they rob and kill them. Guest stars Cindy Morgan and Saxon Trainor.
148	17	"Shadows of the Past"	Tony Mordente	Mark Lisson	February 20, 1991	5717	13.2
Novak's estranged father (Mitchell Ryan) has an interest in the murder witness she is protecting.
149	18	"The Grab"	Corey Allen	Morgan Gendel	February 27, 1991	5718	15.7
A counterfeiter's courier is murdered and the Secret Service is involved.
150	19	"All That Glitters"	Tony Mordente	Daniel Chodos	March 8, 1991	5719	13.2
A coin thief (Patrick St. Esprit) pursues a hooker who stole a rare coin from him. Guest stars Denise Crosby and David DeLuise.
151	20	"Cries of Silence"	Peter Crane	David H. Balkan	March 15, 1991	5720	15.3
The key witness in Hunter's case is the runaway daughter of a deaf woman. Guest stars Jodi Benson and Melissa Hayden.
152	21	"Ex Marks the Spot"	Gus Trikonis	Simon Muntner	April 5, 1991	5721	13.8
The former secretary, mistress, and wife of a dry cleaner (Don Rickles) rob his stores and end up with mob money. Guest stars Leslie Easterbrook and Stacey Nelkin.
153	22	"Little Man with a Big Reputation"	James Darren	Tom Blomquist	April 26, 1991	5722	11.6
A crook chooses Captain Devane as his best man when he is being pressured by former jailmates to commit a crime. Guest stars Jean Kasem.

== TV movies (1995–2003) ==
Title	Directed by	Written by	Original release date	Viewers (millions)
The Return of Hunter	Bradford May	Bill Nuss	April 30, 1995	18.4
Rick Hunter, now a lieutenant, considers marrying his girlfriend, but she's murdered before he can. He suspects that it's probably her abusive ex-husband who's stalking her, but because the man is a celebrity, Hunter's not sure if he will be tried, much less convicted. But when someone calls Hunter with first-hand information about the murder, he wonders if the ex-husband really did it. Guest stars John C. McGinley, Miguel Ferrer, and Wendie Malick.
Hunter: Return to Justice	Bradford May	Stephen J. Cannell & Jeff Diaz & Frank Lupo	November 16, 2002	10.48
On enforced leave following a failed drug bust, LAPD Lieutenant Rick Hunter heads to San Diego, where he catches up with former partner Dee Dee McCall. But upon their reunion, Hunter and McCall become embroiled in a terrifying game of cat and mouse that has its roots in Russia.
Hunter: Back in Force	Jefferson Kibbee	Stephen J. Cannell & Frank Lupo	April 12, 2003	8.13
Lieutenant Rick Hunter, now of the San Diego Police Department, along with his "new" partner Sergeant Dee Dee McCall, must track down a group of women bank robbers who appear to be behind bars when the crimes occur; simultaneously, he's looking for an ex-con he put away who has just been released and is now on a vengeful crime spree. Filming dates: August 14-September 5, 2002

== Revival series (2003) ==
No.	Title	Directed by	Written by	Original release date	Viewers (millions)
1	"Vaya Sin Dios"	Winrich Kolbe	Jeff Diaz & Richard C. Okie	April 19, 2003	5.30
When an illegal Mexican teenager is discovered wandering the streets, it leads Hunter, McCall, and the INS to a person smuggling immigrants into the US on the seas, then murdering them off the San Diego coast. However, when Hunter discovers the mass murder was not business as usual for the smuggler, he begins to question it.
2	"Untouchable"	Tawnia McKiernan	Lawrence Hertzog	April 26, 2003	5.38
Hunter tries to prove that a thug is actually a crime-family member who is supposedly dead.
3	"Dead Heat"	John T. Kretchmer	Lawrence Hertzog	May 3, 2003	5.98
When a jockey and his well-known horse are shot moments away from the finish line, Lieutenant Hunter and Sergeant McCall search for a motive for the attack. However, when the professional hitman paid to end this jockey's winning streak finishes the job, Hunter is left searching for mastermind behind the murder.
4	"To Serve and Protect"	Noel Nosseck	Jeff Diaz	Unaired	N/A
Hunter is forced to protect a murder suspect from the victim's father.
5	"Need to Know"	John T. Kretchmer	Jeff Diaz	Unaired	N/A
Hunter and McCall battle the military while trying to solve the murder of a Marine officer at his home.
