= Deceived by Trust =

- Genre: Drama
- Written by: Jayne Martin; Dan Levine
- Directed by: Chuck Bowman
- Starring: Stepfanie Kramer; Shannon Fill; Conor O'Farrell; Michael Gross
- Music by: Greg Turner
- Country of origin: United States
- Original language: English

Production
- Executive producers: Lawrence Horowitz; Michael O'Hara
- Producer: Tracey Jeffrey
- Production location: British Columbia
- Cinematography: Brenton Spencer
- Editor: Stacy Widelitz
- Running time: 97 minutes
- Production company: O'Hara-Horowitz Productions

Original release
- Network: NBC
- Release: October 23, 1995

Deceived by Trust (also known as Deceived by Trust: A Moment of Truth), is a 1995 American made-for-television drama film directed by Chuck Bowman. It stars ex-Hunter co-star Stepfanie Kramer, Shannon Fill, Conor O'Farrell, and Michael Gross. The film made its debut on NBC on 23 October 1995. The movie is the 12th installment in "The Moment of Truth" series from NBC. The drama was the highest-rated movie of the season. It is based on a true story, with the names and location of the events changed.

== Plot ==
When a beautiful high school student named Cindy (Fill) is sexually harassed by Dr. Gordon Powell (Gross), the principal at her high school, she seeks out guidance counselor Sarah Collins (Kramer). Throughout the film, Collins undertakes some very drastic measures intended to get Dr. Powell fired from his job as principal. Later, Cindy transfers to another school after recanting her story. Just when nothing seems to have come to pass, Collins soon discovers that Dr. Powell has had a history of sexually harassing other female students, so the question becomes "can Collins ever prove Dr. Powell's guilt before he strikes again?".

== Cast ==
- Stepfanie Kramer as Sarah Collins
- Michael Gross as Dr. Gordon Powell
- Shannon Fill as Cindy
- Molly Parker as Rachel Morton
- Conor O'Farrell as Frank Kerns
- Teryl Rothery as Janet Harrison

== Background ==
The movie is based on the true story of James Moffat, who was a principal at Kelvyn Park High School in Chicago. In January 1985, several students from the school reported that they had been sexually abused by Moffat. He was convicted in April 1987 of sexually abusing five teenagers who had attended the school, and was sentenced to 15 years in prison.

Michael Gross, who portrays Dr. Gordon Powell (Moffat) in the film, said he had a "tickle of recognition" when he was reading the script, and proceeded to ask the producers where the actual events took place. They relayed back to him the story of Moffat, the school, and that it took place in Chicago. By sheer coincidence, Gross had graduated from Kelvyn Park in 1965. NBC had no idea he had attended the school when they offered him the role. Gross said he did not know Moffat, but he ended up talking to people at the school who did, which helped him prepare for the role.

== Reception ==
Film critic Kirk Nicewonger said the film "takes a serious issue ... and manages to turn it into a ludicrous exercise in scenery-chewing and cliche-spewing". He notes that it is inspired by a true story, but opines "there's no reason that a decent movie can't be made out of this material". He further laments that the movie "draws its characters so cartoonishly that it's impossible to take seriously". He states that Michael Gross's character "does everything but twirl his mustache and tie Kramer's character to the railroad tracks", and that Kramer's acting is "so woodenly upright that she could pass for a mizzenmast".

Movie reviewer John Martin says the issue with the film is that "you know that the villain will eventually be caught" and you "never feel much affinity for the heroine in the fact-based tale". He says Gross is "effective" in his role, and that Kramer's acting had "little strength or passion". In her review, Suzanne Gill wryly asks; "was the title of the movie drawn from a fish bowl on the network receptionist's desk?" She argues that with "disappointing predictability, the forces of good and evil sally forth onto the field of honor" in the film, and that Gross is "a suitably oily and malevolent Romeo", but the story would have been better "suited for NBC's Dateline than the Monday Night Movie".

Carole Horst wrote in Variety Magazine that the "script does a good job focusing on abuse of power, exposing the pain that the victims of sexual harassment endure, especially the self-blame and loss of self-esteem". She complimented director Chuck Bowman for "keeping the pace snappy and the story rolling and interesting". Horst also notes the "lovely British Columbia locations" used in the film.

== See also ==
- Professional abuse
- Sexual harassment
- Sexual harassment in education
