= Fred Dryer =

American football player and actor (born 1946)

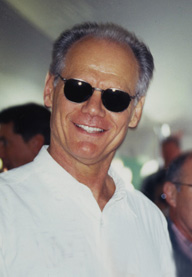
- Dryer, c. 2007

No. 89
- Position: Defensive end

Personal information
- Born: July 6, 1946 (age 80); Hawthorne, California, U.S.
- Listed height: 6 ft 6 in (1.98 m)
- Listed weight: 240 lb (109 kg)

Career information
- High school: Lawndale (Lawndale, California)
- College: El Camino JC (1965–1966); San Diego State (1967–1968)
- NFL draft: 1969: 1st round, 13th overall pick

Career history
- New York Giants (1969–1971); Los Angeles Rams (1972–1981)

Awards and highlights
- Second-team All-Pro (1974); Pro Bowl (1975); NFL sacks leader (1974); First-team Little All-American (1968); NFL records: Most safeties in a game: 2; Most safeties in a season: 2 (tied)

Career NFL statistics
- Fumble recoveries: 20
- Interceptions: 1
- Touchdowns: 1
- Safeties: 2
- Sacks: 103.0
- Stats at Pro Football Reference
- College Football Hall of Fame

John Frederick Dryer (born July 6, 1946) is an American actor, radio host, and former professional football player who played as a defensive end in the National Football League (NFL) for 13 years with the New York Giants and Los Angeles Rams, participating in 176 games and recorded 103 career sacks starting in 1969 until his retirement in 1981, and is the only NFL player to score two safeties in one game. Following his retirement from football, Dryer had a successful career as a film and television actor, notably starring as the titular character Detective Sgt. Rick Hunter in the NBC police drama series Hunter, with his height of 6 ft 6 in (1.98 m) and physique proving useful for action roles.

== Early life ==
John Frederick Dryer was born on July 6, 1946, in Hawthorne, California. He attended Lawndale High School in Lawndale, California.

== College career ==
Dryer attended El Camino Junior College before transferring to San Diego State University (SDSU).

Dryer was inducted to the El Camino Community College Athletic Hall of Fame in 1988 as a charter member and was the Athlete of the Year for his 1966 performance on the football field. Dryer was also a 1966 Junior College All-American.

During Dryer's junior and senior seasons at San Diego State, in which he lettered both seasons, the Aztecs had a combined record of 19–1–1. They were the College Division National Champions in both seasons. In 1967, the Aztecs topped both the Associated Press and United Press International polls as #1. In 1968 San Diego State was voted the champions by UPI and North Dakota State University topped the AP poll, and thus the two schools shared the College Division title.

Dryer was voted the outstanding defensive lineman on the team and as such was the recipient of the Byron H. Chase Memorial Trophy.

Dryer was named to the Little All-America team in 1968 since at the time the school was 1-AA. Dryer played in the East-West Shrine Game in San Francisco, the Hula Bowl in Honolulu and the College All-Star Game in Chicago where the college stars played the world champion New York Jets.

In 1988, Dryer was inducted into the San Diego State University Aztec Hall of Fame.

In 1997, Dryer received college football's ultimate honor in being voted to the College Football Hall of Fame and is one of only three Aztecs in the collegiate Hall of Fame. When voted into the San Diego Sports Hall of Fame in 1998, he joined athletes such as Ted Williams, Dan Fouts, Dave Winfield, and Tony Gwynn in receiving the preeminent recognition for a San Diego athlete.

== NFL career ==
Dryer was selected 13th overall in the first round of the 1969 NFL/AFL draft by the New York Giants. He won a starting job as a rookie. He was the starting right defensive end from 1969 through 1971. Although the NFL did not officially recognize quarterback sacks until 1982, teams did record their own sack data for the time. As such, he led the team in sacks each of those three seasons with 8½ in 1969, 12 in 1970 and 8½ in 1971. He was among the defensive leaders in other categories as well. In 1969, he tallied 58 tackles (39 solo), six passes deflected and forced two fumbles, recovering both.

The next season, Dryer was an alternate to the Pro Bowl but could not play due to a bruised hip. He was Second-team All-NFC after recording 59 tackles (43 solo) four pass deflections, three forced fumbles, while recovering two to go along with his 12 sacks. In 1971, he again led the team with 8½ sacks, and totaled 52 tackles (33 solo). He deflected two passes, forced two more fumbles and recovered two for the third consecutive season.

After several run-ins with Giants management in 1971, Dryer was traded to the New England Patriots in February 1972 for three draft choices (a first and a sixth in 1972; a second in 1973). The Giants used the first-round pick to select defensive back Eldridge Small. Because Dryer had not signed a contract for the 1971 season, he was eligible to become a free agent in May 1972. He refused to report to the Patriots unless they signed him to a long-term contract making him the highest paid defensive lineman in pro football. The Patriots refused to meet his demands and instead dealt him to the Los Angeles Rams for a 1973 first round draft pick (which they ultimately used to select fullback Sam Cunningham) and backup defensive end Rick Cash, four days before Dryer would have become a free agent. This trade gave Dryer what he wanted all along—a move to a West Coast team—and he agreed to a multi-year contract with the Rams. In his first year with the Rams, he backed up left defensive end Jack Youngblood making only four starts but playing in every game despite a broken hand and broken nose. His primary role in 1972 was to come in on likely passing downs and rush the passer. He had 40 tackles (17 solo) and 4½ sacks.

In 1973, Dryer started all 14 games on the right side and became the only NFL player ever to have two safeties in the same game by tackling opposing passers in the end zone twice in the fourth quarter. He ended the season with ten sacks, three forced fumbles with three recovered fumbles (all three were second on the top-ranked Rams defense). After the season, he was a Second-team All-NFC pick by Pro Football Weekly. He finished the season with 39 tackles (21 solo), three forced fumbles and three fumbles recovered.

In 1974, he had 15 sacks, which co-led (with Youngblood) the league, and he was also voted the Rams Outstanding Defensive Lineman. He was named NEA First-team and AP Second-team All-Pro and All-NFC. Statistically, he had another solid year versus the run, totaling 49 tackles (34 solo) and two forced fumbles.

Dryer scored his first NFL touchdown in 1975 on a 20-yard interception return against Philadelphia. After scoring his touchdown against the Eagles, Dryer promised that if he ever scored another, he would set his hair on fire in the end zone. Against the Eagles that day, he chose to celebrate by "rolling six", a touchdown celebration where the player scoring rolls the ball like an imaginary pair of dice with some of his teammates looking on. He ended 1975 with 12 sacks, behind only Jack Youngblood and was voted All-NFC. Additionally, Dryer played in the 1975 Pro Bowl. Statistically, Dryer was excellent against the run with 61 tackles (39 solo) and two passes deflection, two fumbles recovered to go along with the 20-yard TD interception.

After 1975, rule changes affecting the offensive line hindered Dryer because of his small frame. He had a 55-tackle, five-sack season (33 solo) in 1976. He did deflect two passes and forced three fumbles to lead his team. In 1977, Dryer adopted a new diet and was winning praises from NFL sportswriters for the start he had. He recorded 35 tackles (28 solo) and six sacks. He also knocked down four passes, recovered three fumbles and caused one fumble. The next season, 1978 was much of the same. Dryer was the starting right defensive end on the NFL's #1 defense. Personally, he had 51 tackles (33 solo) and forced two fumbles, recovered three, blocked a kick and blocked one pass as the Rams went 12-4 and won their sixth straight division title.

In 1979, Dryer would be named an honorable mention All-NFC after recording 49 tackles (31 solo), ten sacks, and three forced fumbles (with one recovery). Against the New York Giants on October 28 of that year, Dryer recorded a career-high five sacks. At last, the Rams would finally break through and reach the Super Bowl. Dryer played in Super Bowl XIV when the Rams met the Pittsburgh Steelers on January 20, 1980. The Rams led 19–17 against the defending champions, but the Steelers scored fourteen unanswered points to win the game in the fourth quarter 31–19. The following season, Dryer split the time at his right defensive end position with third-year player Reggie Doss. They combined for 67 tackles (Dryer 31, 20 solo) and 12 sacks (Dryer 5½, Doss 6½).

Dryer ended his career with 104 career sacks, although as mentioned the statistic was not recognized until after he retired. Dryer played on a tough Los Angeles Ram defense that allowed fewer points, fewer total yards, fewer rushing yards, and sacked more quarterbacks than any other defense during the 1970s.

In January 1981, Dryer made the cover of Interview magazine, published by Andy Warhol from the late 1960s through the early 1990s and was considered the very essence of "magazine chic". In 2003 the NFL Alumni presented Dryer with its Career Achievement Award which is presented to former NFL players "For Getting to the Top of His Field".

=== Record game ===
Dryer's record-setting game on October 21, 1973, at Los Angeles was a 24–7 win over Green Bay. Down 20–7 in the fourth quarter, the Packers found themselves deep in their own territory when Dryer came storming in from the right side of the defense and chased down Green Bay quarterback Scott Hunter, dropping him in the end zone for a safety.

On the Packers' following possession near their own goal line, Dryer attacked again. He looped through the middle of the Packers' offensive line and dragged backup quarterback Jim Del Gaizo down for his second safety of the game, setting an NFL record. For his efforts, Dryer was named the Associated Press NFL Defensive Player of the Week.

== Acting career ==
Fred Dryer
- Born: John Frederick Dryer
- Occupations: Actor, producer
- Years active: 1976–present
- Spouse: Tracy Vaccaro (m. 1983; div. 1988)
- Children: 1
- Website: Official website

Prior to the start of his show business career, Dryer helped cover Super Bowl IX for SPORT magazine. In response to the perceived grandiose and self-important nature of the NFL's championship match, then-editor Dick Schaap hired Dryer and Rams teammate Lance Rentzel for this journalistic assignment. Donning costumes inspired by The Front Page, "Scoops Brannigan" (Dryer) and "Cubby O'Switzer" (Rentzel) peppered players and coaches from both the Pittsburgh Steelers and Minnesota Vikings with questions that ranged from clichéd to downright absurd. He briefly served as a color analyst on CBS's NFL coverage in 1981 and 1982.

In the early 1980s, when producers/creators Glen and Les Charles and James Burrows were developing the soon-to-be hit sitcom Cheers, Dryer and two other actors were considered for the role of lead character Sam Malone. Ted Danson ultimately won the role, but Dryer appeared in episodes as a sportscaster and Sam's former Red Sox teammate Dave Richards in the episodes Sam at Eleven, Old Flames, Love Thy Neighbor, and 'I' On Sports. He appeared on CHiPs as Lt. John LeGarre in the Season 5 episode Force Seven, about a secret LAPD unit implemented for special situations.

Dryer's best-known acting role came in the 1980s television crime drama Hunter, in which he co-starred with Stepfanie Kramer, followed by Darlanne Fluegel, then Lauren Lane. Rick Hunter's catchphrase was, “Works for me." He starred in the action-thriller movie Death Before Dishonor as well as playing Mike Land in the TV series Land's End (21 episodes, 1995–1996). In 1998, he portrayed Police Chief Masters in Diagnosis: Murder. He portrayed Sgt. Rock during his appearance on Justice League.

In January 2009, Dryer was seen in a cable TV commercial for SMS research company, which obliquely makes reference to his NFL record of two safeties in a game from 1973. Dryer is also now a spokesman for the law service Injury Solutions.

He starred in the drag racing film Snake & Mongoose, which depicts the rivalry between drivers Don "The Snake" Prudhomme and Tom "The Mongoose" McEwen and their groundbreaking accomplishments in the world of drag racing. Dryer played "Ed Donovan", McEwen's engine builder, who coined the nickname "Mongoose".

Dryer appeared in the NBC series Crisis in 2014. In 2015, Dryer guested on Agent X, and joined the ranks of the Marvel Cinematic Universe when he played the evil HYDRA leader, Octavian Bloom, in an episode of Agents of S.H.I.E.L.D. On October 23, 2018, he played a Vietnam veteran on the CBS show NCIS.

== Personal life ==
Dryer has had a long interest in nutrition. In the late 1970s Dryer was consuming 70 raw egg yolks a week. He has since excluded red meat from his diet and eats chicken and vegetables.

He married actress and Playboy centerfold Tracy Vaccaro in May 1983; the couple divorced in 1988. Dryer still resides in Los Angeles and has his own production company, Fred Dryer Productions.
