= The Babysitter's Seduction =

1996 TV drama film

The Babysitter’s Seduction (1996 film)
- Directed by: David Burton Morris
- Written by: Shirley Tallman & Nancy Hersage
- Produced by: Richard Maynard
- Starring: Stephen Collins; Keri Russell; Phylicia Rashad
- Cinematography: John L. Demps Jr.
- Edited by: Corky Ehlers
- Music by: Jan Hammer
- Production companies: Hearst Entertainment, Richard Maynard Productions
- Distributed by: Lionsgate
- Release date: January 22, 1996
- Running time: 1h 25m
- Country: United States
- Language: English

The Babysitter’s Seduction is a 1996 American drama television film directed by David Burton Morris; starring Stephen Collins and Keri Russell.

== Plot ==
It is summer, and Michelle will start college on a swimming scholarship in the fall. The mother of a wealthy family, whom Michelle babysits, dies unexpectedly. The father asks Michelle to take care of the children, and the father gradually seduces her. When police suspect that the mother was murdered (and had been part of an affair), Michelle unwittingly finds herself immersed in a web of lies, and she herself is a suspect. Michelle gradually discovers that things are not as she believed.

== Stephen Collins Scandal ==
The legacy of the movie was damaged by the tragic irony in 2014, when the revelation that the star of the film, Stephen Collins, had admitted in a secret recording two years earlier in a therapy session with his wife Faye Grant of sexually abusing underage girls.

== Cast ==
- Stephen Collins as Bill Bartrand
- Keri Russell as Michelle Winston
- Phylicia Rashad as Det. Kate Jacobs
- Tobin Bell as Det. Frank O'Keefe
- John D'Aquino as Paul Richards
- Linda Kelsey as Alice Winston
- Arian Ash as Tracy Butler
- Dawn Lambing as Sally Bartrand
- Roger Floyd as Danny Bennett
- Adam Crosby as Kyle Bartrand
- Kristie Horton as Jennifer Bartrand
- Travis Robertson as Jeff Winston
- Bob Roitblat as waiter
- Kristian Truelsen as Desk Sergeant
- Kimberly Kashani as Amy
- Sheri Cook as Doreen
- Hersha Parady as Mrs. Bartrand
- Joyce Newman as Pam
- Jessica K. Peterson as housekeeper
- Chad Bonsack as rich boy
- Michael Wayne Thomas as Coroner Assistant

== Filming Details ==
Filmed in Jacksonville, Florida and Jacksonville Beach, Florida
