= Bridge Across Time =

1985 television film by E.W. Swackhamer

- Also known as: Terror at London Bridge
- Genre: Horror film Drama
- Written by: William F. Nolan
- Directed by: E.W. Swackhamer
- Starring: David Hasselhoff; Stepfanie Kramer; Randolph Mantooth
- Theme music composer: Lalo Schifrin
- Country of origin: United States
- Original language: English

Production
- Executive producers: Charles W. Fries; Irv Wilson
- Producers: Richard Maynard; Jack Michon
- Production location: Lake Havasu City, Arizona
- Cinematography: Gil Hubbs
- Editors: Leslie Dennis Bracken; Thomas Fries
- Running time: 96 minutes
- Production company: Charles Fries Productions

Original release
- Network: NBC
- Release: November 22, 1985

Bridge Across Time, also known as Terror at London Bridge, is a 1985 American made-for-television drama film. It was an NBC movie of the week, written by William F. Nolan, directed by E.W. Swackhamer and starred David Hasselhoff, Stepfanie Kramer, and Randolph Mantooth. The relocation of London Bridge to Lake Havasu City, Arizona is the basis of this film, and a series of murders is attributed to the spirit of Jack the Ripper, whose soul is transported to the United States in one of the stones of the bridge.

The film is also known as Arizona Ripper.

== Synopsis ==
In 1888 London, Jack the Ripper is pursued by police and falls into the Thames River near London Bridge, taking a stone from the bridge with him. Nearly a century later, in 1985, the missing stone is recovered and added to the reconstructed London Bridge at Lake Havasu City, Arizona. Shortly after, a tourist cuts her finger and bleeds on the stone, inadvertently resurrecting Jack the Ripper, who begins a new killing spree in the town.

Detective Don Gregory (David Hasselhoff), recently transferred from Chicago for killing a 14-year-old boy whom he mistook for a thief, investigates the murders. He suspects that Jack the Ripper has returned but faces skepticism from his superiors and the community. As the killings continue, Don uncovers clues linking the murders to the original Ripper and the cursed bridge stone.

Don devises a plan to use his love interest Angie (Stepfanie Kramer) to lure the killer. In the climax, Jack the Ripper abducts Angie and attempts to use her blood to return to his own time. Don confronts Jack on the bridge and, overcoming his trauma, shoots Jack, causing him to fall into the river along with the cursed stone. Peace is restored in Lake Havasu City.

== Starring ==
- David Hasselhoff as Don Gregory
- Stepfanie Kramer as Angie
- Randolph Mantooth as Joe Nez
- Adrienne Barbeau as Lynn Chandler
- Clu Gulager as Chief Peter 'Pete' Dawson
- Lindsay Bloom as Elaine Gardner
- Ken Swofford as Ed Nebel
- Rose Marie as Alma Bellock
- Lane Smith as Anson Whitfield
- Paul Rossilli as Jack the Ripper
