= Richard Maynard (television producer) =

American television producer and writer (1942–2007)

Richard Maynard; American; (August 30, 1942 - January 2, 2007) was an American writer, television producer and educator.

He was born on August 30, 1942, in Philadelphia, Pennsylvania and died on January 2, 2007, of natural causes at age 64 at his San Fernando Valley home in California. Maynard received his B.S. and M.A. in history and education from Temple University and another master's degree following studies at the University of Pennsylvania and Princeton University.

He was married and divorced from Lorrie Maynard, with whom he had two sons, Jeffrey Maynard, (an actor and teacher), and Kevin Maynard, (a TV producer, writer and Variety contributor).

== Educator ==
Maynard taught all levels, from high school to graduate school including a ten-year position in the Media Studies M.A. program at New York's The New School. He also taught at Antioch College, UCLA, UC Berkeley and the International School of Film & Television in San Antonio Los Banos, Cuba.

In the 1960s, while teaching at Simon Gratz High School, Maynard developed the Curriculum on Black History for the Philadelphia School District.

== Writer ==
Maynard was editorial director of language arts for Scholastic Publishing for nine years. He contributed to publications including the Los Angeles Times, Las Vegas Weekly, and Emmy Magazine.

== Production credits ==
=== Mini-series ===
- The Neon Empire on Showtime
- Supercarrier

=== Films ===
- Stompin' at the Savoy on CBS
- Mission of the Shark: The Saga of the U.S.S. Indianapolis on CBS
- Bridge Across Time (a.k.a. "Arizona Ripper", or "Terror at London Bridge")
- Time Stalkers
- The Babysitter's Seduction
- Blood Brothers
- Gold Coast
- Normal Life

== Festivals and awards ==
- Normal Life was featured at the 1996 Sundance Film Festival
