= Shelley Taylor Morgan =

American actress (born 1950)

- Born: September 3, 1950 (age 76)
- Occupation: Actress
- Notable work: General Hospital

Shelley Taylor Morgan (born September 3, 1950) is an American actress who is best known for playing Lorena Sharpe in the TV series General Hospital in the mid-1980s.

== Acting career ==
Morgan began her career solely as an actress but eventually branched out to hosting, co-hosting, and contributing editor stints on a variety of shows.

Some acting highlights include Scarface, Days of Our Lives, Archie Bunker's Place, The Sword and the Sorcerer, ABC's Once and Again, Tales from the Crypt, and a role on Hunter where she created Kitty, a flaky but intelligent detective who appeared on several episodes of the series over two seasons.

The role that began her pursuit of an acting career was appearing in Marilyn: The Untold Story.

Her most popular hosting credits include E! Entertainment Television's first live show, Pure Soap - a talk show for soap opera addicts, which ran from October 1993 until November 1994. Other duties at E! were hosting Coming Attractions, The Daytime Emmy Awards and the Soap Opera Digest Awards. She also hosted on ABC's The Home Show, AM Los Angeles, and HGTV's Surprise Gardener.

Stage roles include the controversial Steambath, a co-starring role with Don Knotts, Rue McClanahan and Randolph Mantooth in The Mind with the Dirty Man, and starring roles in the original plays Backbone of America at the Tiffany Theater in Los Angeles, and Aspirins and Elephants.
