= Stepfanie Kramer =

American actress (born 1956)

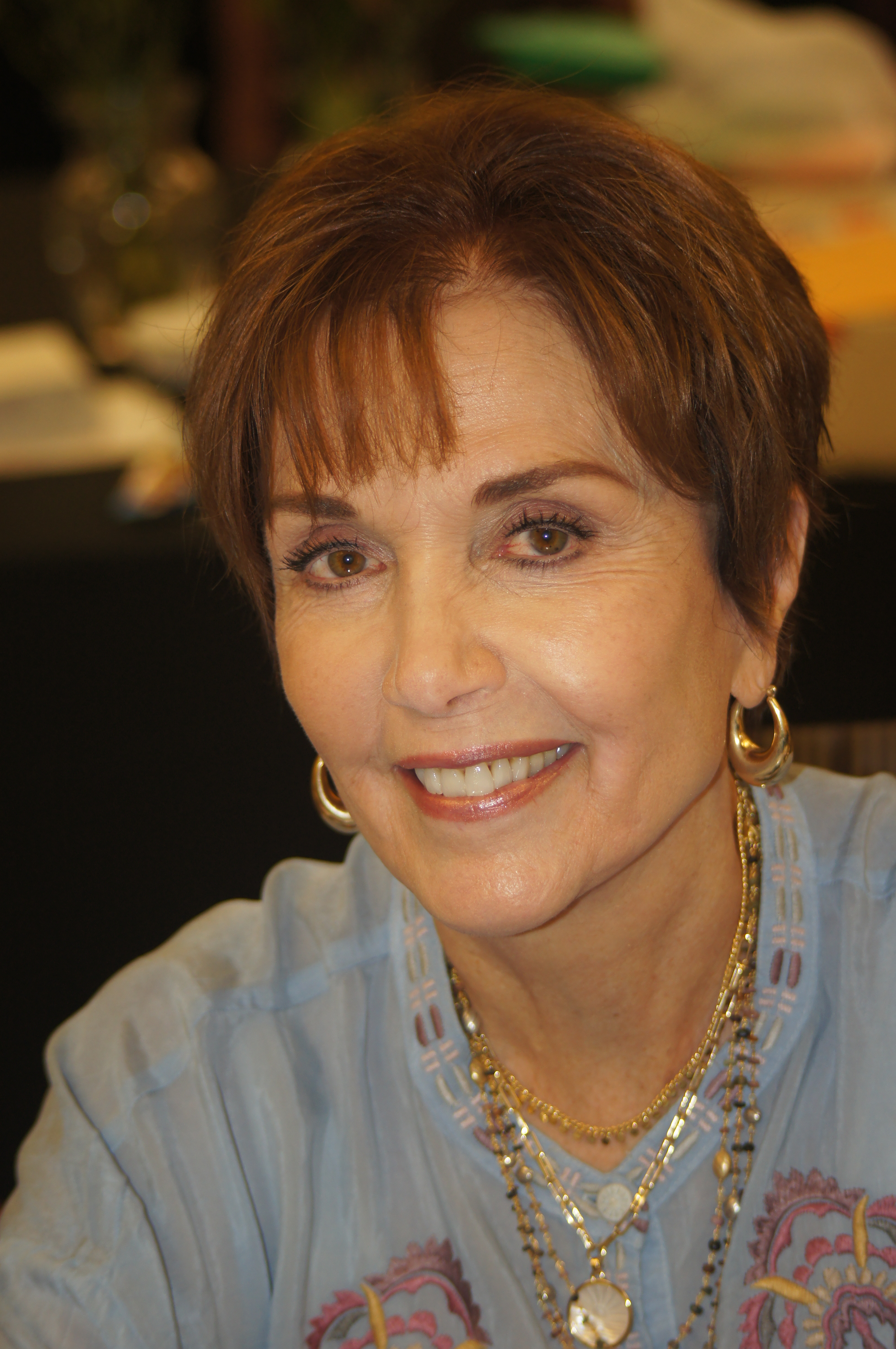
- Born: August 6, 1956 (age 70); Los Angeles, California, U.S.
- Education: Graduate of The American Academy of Dramatic Arts/West
- Occupation: Actress
- Years active: 1977–present
- Spouse: Mark Richards (m. 1992; div. 2001)
- Children: 1
- Honors: First Americans in the Arts organization in 1995, 2002, and 2003
- Website: thestepfaniekramer.com

Stepfanie Kramer (born August 6, 1956) is an American actress and singer/songwriter, who has also written and directed for television shows. She is best known for her lead role as the tough-minded detective Sgt. Dee Dee McCall on the NBC police drama series Hunter. She has been nominated for Daytime Emmy Award for Outstanding Special Class Program in 1985 for hosting the Macy's Thanksgiving Day Parade, and won the Outstanding Performance by a Lead Actress Award honored by the First Americans in the Arts organization in 1995, 2002 and 2003. She was voted one of the "most beautiful women in the history of television" in 1988 through a TV Guide national viewer poll.

== Biography ==
Kramer was born and raised in Los Angeles, California.

=== Professional life ===
Kramer's professional acting career started in the late 1970s, while she was still in school. She guest-starred in several television shows, such as Starsky & Hutch, Dynasty, Bosom Buddies, and Knots Landing. Kramer graduated from The American Academy of Dramatic Arts/West, where she has later taught as a guest instructor. In 1983, Kramer starred in the NBC sitcom We Got It Made. Her big break came in 1984, when she landed a starring role in Hunter, created by Stephen J. Cannell. After a rough start, the show became an international hit, being broadcast for seven seasons. Kramer starred in six of them, a total of 130 episodes. In an interview with Jay Leno in 1989, Kramer admitted that she had not believed the show would be as long-lived as it was.

Already in 1986, Kramer said that she was working on a rock album with composer Mike Post, who had composed music for Hunter. She also announced that an album might be published the following year. That never happened, but in 1990 Kramer announced her departure from Hunter. Although the press claimed it was to concentrate on her music career, Kramer said in a television news interview, "I have been most fortunate in that I've acted, written, and directed while on Hunter. It is time for me to move on to the next phase of my life, both professionally and personally."

Shortly after leaving Hunter, she began recording an album in England with producer Nils Lofgren. The album was never released. In 1992, Kramer married and moved to Colorado. Two years later she gave birth to a daughter. After her divorce in 2001 she and her daughter moved back to Los Angeles. She continued to write music and star in successful made-for-TV movies and indie films. She is a trained mezzo-soprano, and showcased her musical abilities on several episodes of Hunter and on Bob Hope television specials. Kramer's first album, One Dream, was released on October 12, 1999. The album contains ten adult contemporary songs. Most are original songs written by Kramer. The Great American Song Book, her second album, came out early in 2008. On it, Kramer covers 14 classic songs recorded live in a one-woman show which she performs on the road in various national performance venues. In 2008, she represented the U.S. by performing at the International Music Festival in Queretero, Mexico. As a singer, she has performed around the globe.

Kramer was honored by "The First Americans in the Arts Awards" in 1995, 2002 and 2003 by winning the award for Outstanding Performer as a lead actress.

After her departure from Hunter, she continued her work as an actress appearing in several TV shows and movies. Her most notable movie projects include: Coins in the Fountain (1990), Twin Sisters (1992), Beyond Suspicion (1994), Deceived by Trust (1995), Abducted: A Fathers Love (1996), Thrill (1996), The Dogwalker (1999) and The Cutting Edge: Going for the Gold (2006). She also reprised her role as Dee Dee McCall in the two Hunter television movies (2002 and 2003). Due to their strong ratings, NBC attempted to bring the television show back, but unfortunately the 2003 revival was canceled after only four episodes.

In 2015, Kramer was invited to the 55th Monte-Carlo Television festival where she was honored as an "Icon of Television". She returned to the 56th Festival in 2016 as a member of the Fiction Jury of the Festival. In 2025, she was invited to the 35th Shanghai Television Festival where she was honored for her work in "Hunter." which was one of the most successful and popular television shows in China.

Kramer has teamed with writer/producer David Chisolm and writer/producer Chip Hayes to write feature films and television. Kramer has also completed a book reading of the award-winning musical in New York, A Twist of Fate. She co-produced a staged reading of a new musical in Los Angeles called "Doc Holliday The Musical" along with David Chishom. She also was a special guest in the Los Angeles stage production of Menopause The Musical. She has a podcast on YouTube called "Reflections with Stepfanie Kramer" offering insight into weekly quotes, and is in production on an interview podcast called "The Other Side" with Stepfanie Kramer.

=== Personal life ===
Kramer married Mark Richards on May 24, 1992; the couple divorced in February 2001. They have a daughter, Lily Richards, who was born in 1994, who is also an actress, writer and director. According to Kramer's official website, her daughter is the greatest production she has ever been involved in.

== Filmography ==
- NCIS (2021) Sandra Holden
- 9-1-1 (2020) Janet
- A Merry Christmas Match (2019) Dorothy Calvin
- The Encounter (2016) Dee Sanders
- Crossing (2013) Susan
- CSI: Crime Scene Investigation (2012) Vivian Brentson
- The Secret Circle (2012) Kate Meade
- Ground Truth (2006) Karen Dolan
- The Cutting Edge 2: Going for the Gold (2006) – Kate Mosley-Dorsey
- Hunter (2003 revival series) – Dee Dee McCall (4 episodes, 2003)
- Hunter: Back in Force (2003) – Dee Dee McCall
- Hunter: Return to Justice (2002) – Dee Dee McCall
- Twice in a Lifetime – Delia Harmony/Dana Rudolph (1 episode, 2000)
- The Dogwalker (1999) – Helene
- Moloney – Rebecca Kitchens (1 episode, 1997)
- Thrill (1996) – Teresa Colson
- Abducted: A Father's Love (1996) – Loretta Hymens
- Deceived by Trust (1995) – Sarah Ann Collins
- Beyond Suspicion (1994) – Karen Rikehardt
- Twin Sisters (1992) – Carol Mallory/Lynn Cameron
- Coins in the Fountain (1990) – Nikki Taylor
- Hunter (1984–1990) (130 episodes) – Detective Sergeant Dee Dee McCall
- Take My Daughters, Please (1988) – Jessica Fletcher
- Favorite Son (1988) TV Mini Series – Stevie Chandler
- Bridge Across Time (1985) – Angie
- The A-Team – Fire Chief Annie Sanders (1 episode, 1984)
- Mike Hammer – Lisa (1 episode, 1984)
- We Got It Made – Claudia (1983–1984)
- Riptide – Tracy (1 episode, 1984)
- The Dukes of Hazzard – Anna Louise (2 episodes, 1984)
- The Man with Two Brains (1983) – Beautiful Girl Hit by Car
- Trapper John, M.D. – Cheryl (2 episodes, 1981–1982)
- The Devlin Connection – Gwendoline Adams (1 episode, 1982)
- Knots Landing – Marni (2 episodes, 1981–1982)
- Bosom Buddies – Jennifer (1 episode, 1981)
- Dynasty – Melanie (2 episodes, 1981)
- Vega$ – Cathy (1 episode, 1980)
- Married: The First Year (1979) – Sharon Kelly
- The Secret Empire – Princess Tara (unknown episodes, 1979)
- Fantasy Island – Contessa Christina Kastronova/Denise Morot (2 episodes, 1979)
- The Runaways (1 episode, 1978)
- The Hardy Boys/Nancy Drew Mysteries – Jill Sommers (1 episode, 1978)
- Eight Is Enough (1 episode, 1978)
- Starsky & Hutch – Manicurist (1 episode, 1977)
