= Hunter (1984 American TV series) =

American crime drama television series (1984–1991)

- Title card for the first three seasons (1984–1987)
- Genre: Crime drama Action; Thriller; Mystery
- Created by: Frank Lupo
- Starring: Fred Dryer; Stepfanie Kramer; Charles Hallahan; John Amos; Bruce Davison; Darlanne Fluegel; Lauren Lane; Arthur Rosenberg; John Shearin; Garrett Morris; James Whitmore Jr. Rudy Ramos; Perry Cook; Richard Beauchamp; Courtney Barilla
- Composers: Mike Post (1984–90); Pete Carpenter (1984–90); Walter Murphy (1990–91); Christopher Franke (2003)
- Country of origin: United States
- Original language: English
- No. of seasons: 7
- No. of episodes: 153 (list of episodes)

Production
- Executive producers: Stephen J. Cannell (1984–85, 2003); Roy Huggins (1985–88); George Geiger (1988–89); Fred Dryer (1989–91, 2003); Lawrence Kubik (1989–91); Frank Lupo (2003); Stu Segall (2003)
- Running time: 45–49 minutes
- Production companies: Stephen J. Cannell Productions; Stu Segall Productions (2003); 20th Century Fox Television (2003); NBC Studios (2003)

Original release
- Network: NBC
- Release: September 18, 1984 – April 26, 1991
- Release: April 19 – May 3, 2003

Hunter is an American crime drama television series created by Frank Lupo that ran on NBC from September 18, 1984, to April 26, 1991. It stars Fred Dryer as Sergeant Rick Hunter and Stepfanie Kramer as Sergeant Dee Dee McCall, and Charles Hallahan as Captain Charles "Charlie" Devane. The title character Sgt. Rick Hunter is a wily, physically imposing, often rule-breaking homicide detective with the Los Angeles Police Department (originally called Los Angeles Metropolitan Police Department).

The show's executive producer during the first season was Stephen J. Cannell, whose company produced the series. Stepfanie Kramer left after the sixth season (1990) to pursue other acting and musical opportunities. For the seventh and final season, Hunter had two new partners: Officer Joanne Molenski (Darlanne Fluegel) for the first seven episodes, then Sergeant Chris Novak (Lauren Lane) for the remaining eleven.

In the mid-to-late 1990s, Dryer (and eventually Kramer) returned for a trio of TV movies. A short-lived revival aired in 2003, consisting of five feature-length episodes.

== Premise ==
Though the world may perceive Los Angeles as a sunny paradise, Rick Hunter only sees a dark underbelly of street violence.

Hunter is a plainclothes police detective (a la "Dirty Harry") whose world is made up of pimps, low-lifes and psychopaths. This life has toughened him. Although sharp and dedicated, he will sometimes go to dangerous extremes to apprehend a criminal. (A recurring gag on the show during the early seasons was Hunter wrecking whatever beat up police car he was issued while chasing suspects only to be assigned another car in even worse shape by the next episode.) Because of this he is in constant conflict with his straight arrow administrative officer, Lester Cain. Cain is a desk-bound officer who is more concerned with paperwork than with cleaning up the streets. He throws spanners into Hunter's cases whenever possible. Hunter, who is constantly trying to buck the system anyway, just sees Cain as a minor annoyance until Cain requires him to work with a full-time partner.

Knowing that any typical partner will severely cramp his style, Hunter recruits Sgt. Dee Dee McCall to officially become his partner on pretense: they will report to headquarters together at the beginning and end of each day, to keep Cain off their backs, but for the rest of the day they will go their own ways and do their own work without interference with each other. McCall is a hard-edged policewoman whose unorthodox detective work, which rivals that of Hunter's, is not that of a typical female police detective. McCall insists on independence as much as Hunter does; she initially agrees to be his partner only with his total assurance that they will not have to actually work together.

Very shortly, Cain discovers that the two are separating after leaving headquarters, and he orders them to stay together at all times while on duty, while enforcing this with close monitoring. Thus forced against their wills to work together, over time Hunter and McCall gradually develop both a mutual respect and a close personal bond of friendship, both of which in combination make them a very effective team.

=== Hunter's backstory ===
Rick Hunter's father was a mobster involved in organized crime who was nearly killed in a shoot-out with rival gangsters. This made Hunter estrange himself from that world and he decided to become a police officer. He notes that his father approved his decision and was in the front row when Hunter graduated the police academy. Prior to this, a few episodes mention Hunter having served in Vietnam. Hunter would, on occasion, contact relatives and acquaintances in those criminal families for information (provided it did not directly involve them) whenever he had a particularly difficult case to crack.

== Cast and crew ==
=== Original series ===
- Fred Dryer as Detective Sergeant Richard "Rick" Hunter
- Stepfanie Kramer as Detective Sergeant Dee Dee McCall (1984–90)
- Darlanne Fluegel as Officer Joanne Molenski (1990–91)
- Lauren Lane as Sergeant Chris Novak (1991)
- Michael Cavanaugh as Captain Lester D. Cain ("Pilot" Only)
- Arthur Rosenberg as Captain Lester D. Cain / Commander Lester D. Cain (1984/1987)
- John Amos as Captain Dolan (1984–85)
- Bruce Davison as Captain Wyler / Deputy Chief Wyler (1985–86/1987)
- Charles Hallahan as Captain Charles "Charlie" Devane (1986–91)
- John Shearin as Lieutenant Ambrose Finn (1985–88)
- James Whitmore Jr. as Sergeant Bernie Terwilliger (1984–86)
- Garrett Morris as Arnold "Sporty" James (1986–89)
- Richard Beauchamp as Carlos (Assistant Medical Examiner) (1985–87)
- Perry Cook as Barney Udall (Coroner) (1986–90)
- Stanley Kamel as Governor Agent Brad Wilkes (1987–88)
- Paul Mantee as Commander Tom Clayton (1989–1991)
- Courtney Barilla as Allison Novak (1991)

=== TV movies and revival series ===
- Fred Dryer as Detective Lieutenant Richard "Rick" Hunter
- Charles Hallahan as Captain Charles "Charlie" Devane (1995 only)
- Stepfanie Kramer as Detective Sergeant Dee Dee McCall (2002–2003)
- Mike Gomez as Captain Roberto Gallardo
- Michelle Gold as Officer/Detective Cynthia Monetti
- Sid Sham as Officer/Detective Sid Keyes
- Meredyth Hunt as Detective Krysta Carson (TV movies only) (2002–2003)
- Frank Grillo as Detective Terence Gillette (TV movies only) (2002–2003)
- Kenneth Taylor as Officer Mueller (TV movies only) (2002–2003)
- Robert Crow as Officer Wilcher (TV movies only) (2002–2003)
- Alex Mendoza as Detective Anthony Santiago (series episodes only) (2003)

== Episodes ==
| Season | Episodes | Originally released | |
| Season | Episodes | First released | Last released |
|---|---|---|---|
| 1 | 20 | September 18, 1984 | May 11, 1985 |
| 2 | 23 | September 21, 1985 | May 13, 1986 |
| 3 | 22 | September 27, 1986 | July 18, 1987 |
| 4 | 22 | September 24, 1987 | May 7, 1988 |
| 5 | 22 | October 29, 1988 | May 21, 1989 |
| 6 | 22 | October 14, 1989 | May 7, 1990 |
| 7 | 22 | September 19, 1990 | April 26, 1991 |
| TV Movies | | April 30, 1995 | April 12, 2003 |
| Revival | 5 | April 19, 2003 | May 3, 2003 |

=== Season 1 (1984–85) ===
The two-part pilot episode of Hunter debuted on Tuesday, September 18, 1984, airing after the season-three premiere of The A-Team, and ended with strong ratings. Ten days later, starting with its third episode, it was moved to its regular timeslot on Friday nights, this time competing for ratings against Dallas, the second-most watched show for the 1984–85 television season. The show struggled to attract an audience and drew criticism for its often-graphic depiction of violence. In the first season, the producers sought to create a hook by giving the main character a catchphrase, "Works for me", which was sometimes used two or three times in an episode and was even added to the end of Mike Post and Pete Carpenter's opening theme music. Several early episodes featured montages set to popular songs from the 1960s, 1970s, and 1980s, in a style similar to Miami Vice, another NBC show which debuted that same season and initially aired right after Hunter.

Fred Dryer and Stepfanie Kramer in a 1988 promotional photo

Midway through the first season, with low ratings still, Cannell gave network chief Brandon Tartikoff a private screening of the two-part episode "The Snow Queen", which had not yet aired, and asked him to give the show more time to attract viewers. Tartikoff agreed and put the show on hiatus until a better time slot could be found. Two months later, Hunter resumed, this time on Saturday nights, and viewership slowly started to rise. The first season finished in 65th place.

=== Season 2 (1985–86) ===
For its second season, Cannell brought in his mentor, Roy Huggins, best known for his work on Maverick and The Rockford Files, to refine the show. As the new executive producer, Huggins pushed up the violence but softened the main character's fractious relationship with his superiors, dropped a backstory concerning Hunter's family ties to the mob, and emphasized the chemistry between Hunter and McCall. Captain Cain was replaced with Captain Wyler, who unlike Cain was not always looking for an excuse to fire Hunter; instead, Wyler viewed Hunter with ordinary respect and generally defended Hunter and McCall as members of his squad. Huggins also moved the show's setting out of the back streets and into the more desirable areas of Los Angeles. Emboldened, Dryer and Kramer frequently improvised the scripts, and the Hunter character broke the fourth wall for the first time with an aside to viewers at the end of the episode "The Beautiful and the Dead".

Probably the most memorable aspect to the second season was the two-part episode "Rape and Revenge", which may have drawn from some diplomatic-immunity scandals that were prominent in the news. A psychopathic foreign diplomat meets McCall and wants to have a relationship with her, and after she declines, he brutally rapes her in her home. Hunter is badly shot in the shoulder and must recover quickly, then go to the diplomat's home country to dispense justice, Hunter-style. This episode was considered very controversial for its realistic and shocking (violent, but not sexually graphic) depiction of a violent rape, which was not common in TV shows at the time. Because of the controversial plot and convincing acting, "Rape and Revenge" is one of the most remembered and popular episodes of the series.

Another important development in the second season came near its end (in the episode "The Return of Typhoon Thompson"), when viewers were first introduced to Hunter and McCall's favorite street informant, the humorous Arnold "Sporty" James, played by Garrett Morris. "Sporty" would continue to appear from time to time, usually in one or two short scenes of an episode but occasionally as a major supporting character, through the coming seasons.

Viewers also responded to Huggins' changes, and the show's second season ended in 38th place in the Nielsen ratings. Hunter continued this progress to become a mainstay of NBC's Saturday-night schedule.

In syndication, the season-two introduction (titles sequence) was replaced by the season-one introduction. The former showed Hunter entering a women's locker room in one scene, and McCall and him pointing their guns at each other with the bathroom light on in another scene.

=== Season 3 (1986–87) ===
Just before work on the third season began, Dryer threatened to quit unless his salary, reportedly US$21,000 per episode, was raised and creative changes were made. Cannell responded with a US$20 million breach-of-contract lawsuit. A compromise was reached, a new deal with Dryer reportedly earning US$50,000 per episode. The third season, again led by Huggins, added Charles Hallahan as Captain Charlie Devane, who remained Hunter and McCall's captain for the rest of the show, eventually included in the opening credits of the show and becoming one of the show's main stars (none of the previous captains in the series had achieved this). This was the show's first season in the top 30, coming in at 25th.

In the episode "Shades" (which was the season finale, but aired later in the summer, in July 1987) when Hunter went missing, McCall teamed with a somewhat ditzy Columbo-like Detective Sergeant Kitty O'Hearn (Shelley Taylor Morgan). O'Hearn reappeared during the season-four three-part episode "City of Passion". Another remembered episode from season three was "Requiem For Sergeant McCall", which was a contradiction to a storyline from the beginning of the show. When the show first started, McCall's husband (Steven McCall) was supposedly killed five years before, in 1979, by a "punk" kid during a routine stop. At that time, Steven and Dee Dee were newly married and starting out as rookie uniform cops. However, in 1987, in "Requiem", just five years before (which would be around 1982 instead of 1979), Steven was a homicide detective (while Dee Dee was still just a rookie) and he was working on a big murder case that resulted in him being killed. In "Requiem", Steven's killer is getting paroled, and Dee Dee McCall is doing everything she can to get him back in prison — plus trying to crack the original murder case that Steven died trying to solve five years earlier.

Another notable episode was "Any Second Now", in which Theresa Saldana played a pianist being stalked by a psychotic fan. This was based on the real-life incident in which Saldana herself was stalked and brutally stabbed outside her Los Angeles home by Scottish immigrant and drifter, Arthur Richard Jackson, in 1982. The violent attack later became the subject of the 1984 TV film, Victims for Victims: The Theresa Saldana Story, and Jackson was then extradited to England to be tried for the attack on Saldana and also a robbery-and-murder in 1966. He was committed to a psychiatric hospital and remained there until his death of a massive heart failure in 2004.

=== Season 4 (1987–88) ===
Huggins retired at the end of the fourth season, which placed 18th in the Nielsen ratings. A three-part storyline, "City of Passion", teamed Hunter and Dee Dee with Sergeant Kitty O'Hearn (Shelley Taylor Morgan) and her new partner, Sergeant Brad Navarro (Erik Estrada). Together, they captured the serial rapist called Big Foot. Originally, the plot of "City of Passion" involved McCall getting raped again—this time by Big Foot, and she had to deal with the pain and emotions as she did in the second season's "Rape and Revenge". However, Stepfanie Kramer immediately balked at this and argued the rape idea had already been done, and to repeat it, as well as having her character put in a situation to get raped again, was ridiculous. Kramer threatened to quit unless the script was changed. Producers and writers agreed, and a compromise was made: Big Foot attacked and attempted to rape McCall, but she fought him and prevented the rape.

Also known as one of the more memorable episodes for fourth season was "The Black Dahlia". The real-life infamous unsolved Black Dahlia LA murder case from 1947 is thrust back into headlines as bones with identical cuts to the historical case are discovered under an old building being demolished. In the episode, Hunter and McCall solve the famous murder case 41 years to the day (1947–88) as the episode aired on the anniversary date of the real-life murder. As a special message at the end states, the real-life case is still open, and the real killer has never been found.

The episode "Murder He Wrote" was a play on words with the show Murder, She Wrote which was on CBS at the time. In fact, actress Marge Redmond was similar looking to Angela Lansbury in the episode, which led to a funny exchange between Hunter and McCall in one scene where Redmond's character "looked familiar".

Opening Credits changed, most notably removal of the gun and car "action" clips used in previous seasons. This reflected a change in the format where the frequent car chases and shootouts from the first three seasons were dropped and the show became more of a standard police procedural, with only occasional action scenes.

=== Season 5 (1988–89) ===
For the fifth season, George Geiger took on the role of executive producer, having worked in the same capacity on Scarecrow and Mrs. King, as well as a brief stint as co-executive producer on Miami Vice. In the first four seasons, Hunter and McCall typically worked on cases together, allowing the producers to showcase the chemistry between the actors, but the fifth season increasingly had them working apart, ostensibly to lessen the workload of Dryer and Kramer and to allow richer, more complex stories. So instead of jeans and an old sports jacket, Hunter often was seen in a full suit and tie.

One of the most memorable episodes of the fifth season was the special three-part episode "City Under Siege", which had a special introduction for each of the three parts. It dealt with a psychotic woman named Iris Smith (Cec Verrell) and her crazy boyfriend, Billy Joe Powell (Daniel Quinn), who terrorized the city of Los Angeles, committing multiple murders against people who the woman felt had "wronged" her in some way.

Hunter was one of the intended victims, having arrested Billy Joe years earlier for a series of murders in which he killed his female victims with a straight razor. One sub-plot focused on the huge crime spree throughout the city and the pressure the police department was under to get it under control. Another sub-plot involved a corrupt Deputy Chief named Curtis Moorehead (Robert Vaughn), who continually hamstrung the entire police department's efforts to find Iris and Billy Joe in order to further his own ends.

Further compounding the problem was Jack Small (James Sikking), a local resident who aggressively took the law into his own hands to combat the local crime wave, earning him a reputation in his neighborhood as an urban vigilante. He had a teenage daughter, Debbie (Brynn Horrocks) who was a good-hearted but troubled young woman whom McCall befriended while she was working undercover at her high school investigating the murder of one of the teachers named Sandra Clemens. Sandra was Iris' old teacher whom she had a grudge against for stopping her from stealing lunch money from a fellow student. Another subplot of the story revolved around Johnny Youngblood (Craig Hurley), a mover and shaker at the school who dealt in various shady enterprises. Also appearing in a guest-starring role was real-life journalist, Saida Pagan as television reporter, Saida Rodrigues Pagan. In part two, Laurelle Brooks guest-starred as Allison, a naive high-school cheerleader who falls under Johnny's charms and unknown to her, make a videotape of them having sex. At the end of the episode, statistics were presented showing a reduction of crime in Los Angeles that year. The fifth season placed 17th in the Nielsen ratings.

In the episode "Shoot to Kill", Hunter helps McCall get back on active duty after an IA investigation. Hunter jokes about "returning the favor". McCall winks, smiles and asks Hunter to "follow her". As Hunter walks behind her he looks right into the camera and says "After all this time, it was bound to happen eventually." It's not proven whether they did sleep together here, but in the Season 6 episode "Unfinished Business" it's confirmed they did at least once but based on the timeline in the episode it would have happened in season 3, not season 5.

Uniformed officers' costumes changed, dropping the Metro Police shoulder patch of previous four seasons, leaving the uniforms looking more the real LAPD. Door shields on patrol cars also changed to look like those of the LAPD.

=== Season 6 (1989–90) ===
By the sixth season, Dryer's growing influence had won him the role of executive producer. Probably the most remembered episode of the sixth season was "Unfinished Business". During this episode, the audience learns that Hunter and McCall had actually once slept together, causing a rift in their working relationship. Fred Dryer stated that this episode was filmed to try to appease fans and the network, who were constantly wanting Hunter and McCall to get together. However, Fred Dryer and Stepfanie Kramer stated they did not want that to happen, because once it did, Hunter would become Hart to Hart.

Another memorable episode this season was "Yesterday's Child". In this episode, a Vietnamese man visits Hunter and pleads with him to take on the case of a robbery and murder at an upscale car dealership, of which his son was the main suspect. Over the course of the conversation, Hunter discovers that the 17-year-old suspect was actually his own son. The boy is revealed to be the product of a relationship Hunter had with a woman while he was in Vietnam.

Also for this season, homicide was moved to the more updated Parker Center, instead of the old downtown division building. However, at the end of the sixth season, which placed 26th in the Nielsen ratings, Stepfanie Kramer decided to leave the series to pursue a career in music. Kramer's character was written out in the season's two-part finale showing the McCall character marrying an old flame and moving out of Los Angeles.

=== Season 7 (1990–91) ===
For the seventh and final season, NBC shifted the show to 10 pm on Wednesdays. Hunter transfers to Metro, and a new female co-star, Darlanne Fluegel as Officer Joanne Molenski, was brought in. However, she reportedly had creative differences with Fred Dryer, and halfway through the season, she decided she wanted out. Her character was murdered by a female serial killer in the two-part episode "Fatal Obsession". Her replacement for the second half of the season was Lauren Lane as Sergeant Chris Novak, supposedly a former girlfriend of Hunter's. Hunter's signature unmarked vehicle, a moss green 1977 Dodge Monaco, was also finally replaced (after an accident with Molenski's cruiser in the season's first episode) by an updated new silver 1990 Ford LTD Crown Victoria. Hunter was now also back to wearing jeans and a shirt. Also, for the first time (aside from the sixth-season finale), Hunter made sporadic appearances in uniform.

However, the new partners and changes did little to boost ratings (47th in the Nielsen standings). A salary dispute involving Dryer led to the show being discontinued at the end of the season.

=== Reunions and revivals ===
Four years after the original series ended, a reunion NBC TV movie, The Return of Hunter: Everyone Walks in L.A., had Dryer and Charles Hallahan reprise their roles as Rick Hunter and Charlie Devane. Hunter had now also been promoted to lieutenant. Airing on April 30, 1995, the movie seemed to take the Dirty Harry idea as the plot—a psycho wants fame and/or to be noticed and begins terrorizing the city to gain media attention. Along the way, he becomes infatuated with attention from Hunter, eventually wanting to kill him. Stepfanie Kramer, pregnant at the time, did not reprise her role as Dee Dee McCall. The TV-movie co-starred Barry Bostwick, Miguel Ferrer, and John C. McGinley.

Seven years later in November 2002, 11 years after the original series ended, the reunion TV movie Hunter: Return to Justice made its premiere to strong ratings. This time, Stepfanie Kramer returned to her role as McCall, and the show's setting switched from Los Angeles to San Diego—as Hunter's current L.A. partner is killed in the line of duty.

Given the success of the TV movie, Cannell, Dryer, and NBC attempted to bring back Hunter as a regular series: the April 2003 airing of another TV movie, Hunter: Back in Force, served as the pilot for the new series. The network decided to broadcast three new one-hour episodes of Hunter ("Vaya Sin Dios", "Untouchable", and "Dead Heat"). Another two episodes were filmed (as originally five episodes were to be aired), but never shown in the United States, as NBC decided to cancel the new series. Fred Dryer later cited "creative difficulties" and budget constraints as the reasons for the revival's unexpected end.

== Production ==
=== Vehicles ===
In the pilot television film, Hunter drove a blue 1977 Dodge Monaco and a 1970 Ford LTD. Because Hunter constantly was getting into wrecks chasing suspects and regularly "busted" up any police car he was given, the department would only issue him older model cars that would barely run. Once the series started (fall 1984), during the first season, Hunter drove a 1972 Chevrolet Impala, a 1971 Chevrolet Nova, a 1974 Plymouth Satellite, and a 1979 Chevrolet Caprice Classic. A 1971 Impala was actually shown exploding to end the episodes using Chevrolets. Monacos seemed to be the police car of choice, as the second season had Hunter occasionally driving a junker multiple-colored side panel 1977 Monaco (jokingly referred to as the "Partridge Family" Monaco), as well as other '77 models in yellow, brown, and black. After the show was more "established" and starting with the third season and through the first episode of seventh season, Hunter drove a moss green 1977 Monaco. This car was in better condition than the previous Monacos and became Hunter's trademark vehicle — to the point that when it was destroyed in the third season, it was replaced with an identical one. During the seventh and last season, Detective Hunter drove a new silver 1991 Ford LTD Crown Victoria.

During the first two seasons, McCall drove a garnet red and silver 1984 Dodge Daytona Turbo Z. Then starting with season three and on through season five, McCall drove a bright red 1987 Daytona Shelby Z (Sometimes though, a "Turbo Z" badge on this Daytona is also clearly visible). During the sixth season - her final season, she drove a gold-colored 1990 Dodge Dynasty. (An episode during the fourth or fifth season showed the outside of what was supposedly McCall's house and a yellow 1987 Ford Mustang was out front. However, McCall is only shown driving it once and then it was never shown again.)

Both Officer Joanne Molenski and Sgt. Chris Novak, during the last season, drove a tan/beige 1991 LTD Crown Victoria.

Captain Charles "Charlie" Devane drove a brand new light blue metallic 1988 Ford LTD Crown Victoria hard top sedan starting in season 4. This vehicle was subsequently replaced with a light gray 1989 Ford LTD Crown Victoria. The 1989 was then replaced in season 7 with a 1990 Ford LTD Crown Victoria hardtop sedan. Other undercover officers in season 7 drove one of three 1987 Chevrolet Caprice 9C1 4 door sedans, one in navy blue, one in silver, and one in brown.

In the first reunion film, The Return of Hunter: Everyone Walks in L.A., Hunter drove a black 1995 Ford Crown Victoria. In Hunter: Return to Justice, Hunter drove a black 2002 Ford Crown Victoria P71 Police Interceptor and McCall drove a silver 2002 Mercedes Benz CLK320 convertible. In Hunter: Back in Force and the subsequent new series, Hunter drove a black 2003 Ford Crown Victoria P70 [LWB] Long Wheel Base Police Interceptor and McCall occasionally drove a black 2003 Ford Expedition.

== Home media ==
Anchor Bay Entertainment released the first three seasons of Hunter on Region 1 DVD between January 2005 and January 2006. Due to poor sales, no further seasons were released.

On October 14, 2009, Mill Creek Entertainment was announced to have acquired the rights to several Stephen J. Cannell series, including Hunter. They subsequently re-released the first two seasons on DVD.

On July 27, 2010, Mill Creek released Hunter - The Complete Series, a 28-disc collection featuring all 152 episodes of the series.

On November 10, 2011, Mill Creek Entertainment released The Return of Hunter TV special on DVD in a four-pack.

On November 12, 2015, Tiberius Film in Germany released Hunter - The Complete Series, a 42-disc collection featuring all 152 episodes of the series in a special edition case, complete with an episode guide and collector's cards. The same collection was released as a standard edition on May 4, 2017. These releases are encoded Region 2.

Due to music rights issues, on both the Anchor Bay Entertainment and Mill Creek Home Entertainment, certain original songs throughout the series have been replaced with newer recordings. The German releases from Tiberius Film are complete and uncut, featuring the original broadcast soundtracks.

On April 29, 2022, Visual Entertainment released Hunter - The Complete TV Series, a special collection featuring all 152 episodes of the series plus the TV movie The Return of Hunter.

The 2000s reunion movies and revival episodes have yet to premiere on DVD.

| DVD name | Ep# | Release date |
|---|---|---|
| The Complete First Season | 19 | January 11, 2005; January 19, 2010 (re-release) |
| The Complete Second Season | 23 | July 12, 2005; May 18, 2010 (re-release) |
| The Complete Third Season | 22 | January 3, 2006 |
| The Complete Series | 152 | July 27, 2010; April 29, 2022 (re-release) |
| The Return of Hunter | 1 | November 10, 2011 |

== International airings ==
- In Australia, the show was shown on the regional station GTS/BKN and PRIME. It also screened on Thursday nights at 9.30 on STW - 9 in Perth in the '80s, and ATN - 7 in Sydney in the '80s.
- In Barbados, the show was shown on CBC TV 8.
- In Brazil, the show was shown on Rede Globo, dubbed in Portuguese.
- In Canada, the show was shown on the Global Television Network.
- In China, the show was dubbed in Standard Chinese and aired on STV. Hunter was one of the first US series to air regularly in China. Kramer was invited to China to sing at the Shanghai TV & Film Festival. Both Dryer and Kramer are still widely recognized in China. Dryer's efforts to set a Hunter movie there in the late 1990s did not bear fruit. The Hunter TV series is a favorite of the disgraced former Beijing Mayor Chen Xitong, who had quoted the name, character, and events of the TV series in various speeches he delivered.
- In Mexico, the series was shown as El Cazador. It was broadcast by Televisa Network on Canal Cinco.
- In Chile, the series was shown (until the sixth season) as Hunter on TVN
- In Croatia, the show was shown on HRT.
- In Colombia, the series was presented as El Cazador. It was broadcast by Producciones JES on Cadena Uno every Saturday night at 21:45, from 1987 to 1991. The final season was aired in 1993, thursdays at 5:30 pm, an unlikely time slot for an adult cop series.
- In Costa Rica, the show was shown on Teletica Canal 7 as El cazador.
- In Czech Republic, the show was shown on TV Prima.
- In Egypt, the show was shown on القناة الثانية (Channel 2) a lot during the '90s.
- In France, the show was shown on TF1 as Rick Hunter inspecteur choc.
- In Germany, the show was shown on Sat.1.
- In Greece, the show was shown on Star Channel.
- In Hungary, the show was shown on Viasat 3.
- In Gibraltar, the show was shown on GBC TV Gibraltar Broadcasting Corporation.
- In Hong Kong, ATV broadcast the show.
- In Indonesia, the show was shown on TVRI.
- In Israel, the show was shown on Israel 10.
- In Italy, the show was shown on Rai Due.
- In Japan, the show was shown on TBS and TV Tokyo.
- In Lebanon, the show was shown on the Lebanese tv station LBCI.
- In the Netherlands, the show was shown on RTL 4.
- In Pakistan, the show was aired on Pakistan Television (PTV)
- In the Philippines, the show was aired on RPN-9.
- In Sweden, the show was shown on TV4.
- In Thailand, the show was shown on Channel 3.
- In Turkey, the show was shown on Star TV and Kanal D.
- In the United Kingdom, the first two seasons aired regionally on terrestrial broadcaster ITV, the remainder on satellite/cable channel Sky One.

== See also ==
- Sledge Hammer!, a parody show with a similar lead character
