= A Sinful Life =

- Theatrical release poster
- Directed by: William Schreiner
- Screenplay by: Melanie Graham
- Produced by: Daniel Raskov
- Starring: Anita Morris; Dennis Christopher; Shelly Desai; Rita Gomez; David Labiosa; Rick Overton
- Cinematography: Jonathan West
- Edited by: Jeffrey Reiner
- Music by: Todd Hayen
- Production company: New Line Cinema
- Distributed by: New Line Cinema
- Release date: June 30, 1989
- Running time: 90 minutes
- Country: United States
- Language: English

A Sinful Life is a 1989 American comedy film directed by William Schreiner and written by Melanie Graham. The film stars Anita Morris, Dennis Christopher, Shelly Desai, Rita Gomez, David Labiosa and Rick Overton. The film was released on June 30, 1989, by New Line Cinema.

== Plot ==
A dentist is seen, dead of a suicidal gunshot. Wife of dentist consoles daughter that she and daughter will be okay, saying that she used to have only a mother too, and they used to watch TV together. Claire is seen in modern day, crying in front of the TV, and her daughter Baby consoles her. Claire laments having lost an old flame, Harlan. Claire drinks in front of Baby is indignant that Baby’s classmates talk badly about Claire. Baby is obsessed with pom-poms. Claire doesn’t get up to wake Baby for the school bus and writes a clearly fake excuse note for Baby to take to her teacher to explain her lateness. Janitor comes to the apartment to fix a leaky sink. Teacher sees through the note and tells Baby she will be making a home visit soon. Claire explains to janitor she used to be a dancer on Sonny & Cher, then seduces janitor into her bed in her messy, somewhat cockroach-infested room. Theresa, a cross-dressing/trans woman comes to the apartment to visit. Baby asks Claire if she can put some candy in a cake for her teacher, Claire says yes. Janitor comes out of bedroom, and Theresa smiles knowingly as janitor leaves. Theresa and Claire chat. Baby stirs prescription pain-killers into cake batter, unsupervised in the kitchen. Theresa leaves. Claire begins to clean up the apartment. Janitor comes up to the apartment, concerned that another lovemaking rendezvous has been cancelled for the home visit. Claire’s cancellation note of the day’s session hints at loving janitor. Janitor comes in and eats some of the cake and falls unconscious on the couch. Teacher knocks and announces herself and Claire panickedly flattens him out on the couch and covers him in pillows and an afghan. Teacher comes in and looks at the apartment judgementally. Claire and Baby don’t let teacher sit on the couch, claiming it’s in bad shape. Teacher threatens that she will have Baby removed by Social Services if the apartment isn’t cleaned up and a new couch obtained, and most seriously of all, that as Claire is unmarried, it is likely that the child will be removed to be with her father. Claire explains the father could be any of dozens of men with a connection to a local sperm bank. Teacher indicates she already has a list of all those men and she is investigating to find the father. Teacher leaves. Theresa arrives and suggests that if Claire married janitor, it would improve her standing at keeping custody. Claire waxes dreamily about a couch at Sears she would like to own. Nathan Flowers calls the apartment to ask Claire to tell Theresa she is hogging the dryer in the laundry room. Theresa tells Claire Nathan works at Sears. Claire asks Theresa to give Nathan a note. Nathan comes to the apartment. Claire sends Baby away. Nathan is stiff and refuses alcohol and expresses praise for God. Claire suggests Nathan stay for dinner, seductively describing that she will be cooking weiners and beans. Nathan becomes somewhat tongue-tied and begins to talk to Claire about Sears. Claire acts surprised. Nathan delivers a grandiloquent, fiery blessing at dinnertime. Janitor comes to the apartment to try to have another bedroom session with Claire, and becomes angry to see Nathan there. Nathan tries to verbally put janitor in his place, but the much larger janitor puts Nathan into a closet. Janitor quarrels with Claire about the situation and storms off. Nathan tells Claire he intends to complain about the janitor to the landlord. Claire sends an apology note to the janitor, and asks to be given space for a week so that she can do what she needs to do to get a couch, but that she is hopeful that she and janitor can perhaps marry each other some day. Janitor is mollified. Nathan reads strange bible passages to Claire, who says that Baby really wants a peach couch ASAP. Nathan explains that Sears carries one and he could get her credit to be able to buy the couch if they were married, and asks her to marry him. She offers to “swap miracles” with him instead, hinting at sex. He professes his love and promises to have the couch by the weekend if she accepts, which she finally does. Nathan leaves. Janitor begins boring holes through Claire’s apartment door, which she opens angrily. Janitor is drunk. Claire angrily says she told him to stay away for a week. Janitor explains he couldn’t stay away, because of how classy Claire is...that she has class “up the butt.” He expresses impatience for their upcoming marriage. She breaks it to him that it’s over between them and that she is engaged to Nathan. Janitor is upset, then angry and indignant, and storms off, promising to come back in her life like a half-crushed cockroach. The landlord fires janitor and kicks him out of the building. Claire coaxes Baby to want a peach couch for her birthday, which Baby dutifully then wishes for. Janitor receives an investigatory letter saying that his former connection to a local sperm bank indicates that he may possibly be Baby’s father. Janitor sees this as his door back into Claire’s life...for revenge. Teacher comes to speak with janitor...the only man who responded to an investigatory letter she sent to every man on the list of people connected to the local sperm bank, and offers him a job as a school janitor so that he will be employed, to improve his standing to be able to take custody of Baby away from Claire. Teacher tells janitor that his standing would be better if he were married. Baby sits on a new peach couch as Theresa, Nathan and Claire get ready for a birthday party for Baby. Teacher arrives for the birthday party and to inspect whether her required changes to the apartment have been made, meets Theresa, and Nathan, and also sees and sits on the new couch. Baby opens presents and janitor knocks on the door and is let in. Claire says he is not invited, but teacher explains he is there with her...that they have married each other. Janitor explains that he intends to try to take custody of Baby. Claire angrily exclaims that her apartment is clean and she is engaged to a godfearing man in Nathan and that she is a suitable parent for Baby. Janitor proclaims to everybody there that until recently, he had had a sexual relationship with Claire. Nathan is appalled and angry to learn this fact which Claire had never told him before. A stripper shows up to the party, instead of what was understood to be a clown. She is an older woman, overly made up, chewing gum, and does a fairly graceless raunchy dance inappropriate for a child’s party. Nathan and teacher are appalled. Janitor is impressed. Theresa and Claire find it all fairly entertaining. Teacher shuts it down when the stripper flashes her breasts. Claire announces cake will be served in the kitchen. Janitor and teacher grab Baby and run down the stairs to flee the building with her. Claire pursues them, while Nathan pursues her, calling her a “whore”, and the stripper pursues Nathan asking if he is looking for a “whore”, and they all land in a pile in the lobby. Claire announces she will decide herself which man on the list will be considered Baby’s father. She selects Harlan, her long lost lover. Teacher says that Harlan died in an earthquake. Claire explains his body was never found. Theresa comes down the stairs and removes her wig and reveals herself to be the former Harlan. Claire asks Theresa if they could be married as wife and wife. Theresa agrees. Janitor and teacher leave angrily without Baby. Nathan and the stripper walk away together, Nathan smiling dreamily into her eyes, his hand cupping and kneading her butt. Theresa, Claire and Baby watch TV together and look forward to their wedding. Theresa leaves the apartment. Claire gives one last birthday present to Baby: pom-poms. We see a mother consoling a daughter in the future; that daughter’s grandmothers arrive...older Claire and Theresa, there to console their grand-daughter about her father having committed suicide by gun. Flash back to Baby cheering with her pom-poms and jumping happily onto Claire whose heart is full of happiness.

== Cast ==
- Anita Morris as Claire Vin Blance
- Dennis Christopher as Nathan Flowers
- Shelly Desai as Bagdasarisa
- Rita Gomez as Mrs. Alvarez
- David Labiosa as Rafael
- Rick Overton as Janitor
- Kirsten Price as Sweetie
- Mark Rolston as Teresa
- Cynthia Songé as Rainbow Smiles
- Cynthia Szigeti as Mrs. Crow
- Blair Tefkin as Baby
