= Dead by Dawn =

Dead by Dawn may refer to:

== Film ==
- Dead by Dawn (film festival), an annual horror film festival
- Evil Dead II, a 1987 horror film sometimes promoted with the subtitle Dead by Dawn
- Dead by Dawn (1998 film), 1998 film with Jodie Fisher
- Dead by Dawn (2020 film), a horror-thriller film

== Music ==
- "Dead by Dawn", a song from the 1990 album Deicide by Deicide
- "Dead by Dawn", a song from the 2004 album No Sir, Nihilism Is Not Practical by Showbread
- "Dead by Dawn", a song from the 2019 album Grave House by Sematary and Ghost Mountain
