= Stacey Williams =

American fashion model

Stacey Williams (born April 14, 1968) is an American fashion model known for her work in the Sports Illustrated Swimsuit Issues in the 1990s. In October 2024 she alleged that, in 1993 while dating Jeffrey Epstein, Epstein "shared her" with Donald Trump in a groping incident.

== Early life and education ==
Originally from Dallas, Pennsylvania (near Wilkes-Barre), she moved to Mechanicsburg at the age of 13, and is a graduate of Cumberland Valley High School in Mechanicsburg.

== Career ==
Williams was featured in the Sports Illustrated Swimsuit Issues from 1992 to 1998 and was also in the 40th anniversary issue in 2004 as part of SI's Hall of Fame. A student of William Esper, she appeared in films such as The Dogwalker and Gangster World, and had a brief role in the feature film Jerry Maguire. Sonic Youth mention Stacey and other Sports Illustrated models in their 1992 song "Swimsuit Issue."

== Trump/Epstein allegation ==
In October 2024 Williams recounted an incident with Donald Trump that occurred in the late winter of 1992 or early 1993. At the time, Williams had been dating Jeffrey Epstein for several months and had previously met Trump at a party. She said "It became very clear then that he and Donald were really, really good friends and spent a lot of time together." Some time after that in New York City, Epstein took her to visit Trump in Trump Tower. She alleged that after greeting her, Trump immediately began groping her, putting his hands “all over my breasts” as well as her waist and buttocks, while Epstein looked on smiling. She later stated that the alleged incident appeared to be part of some "twisted game". "I had this horrible pit in my stomach that it was somehow orchestrated. I felt like a piece of meat," she said in an interview. She and Epstein broke up soon after that. Epstein was later convicted on sex offenses and died in prison in 2019. Williams said she is still in possession of a postcard invitation to Mar-a-Lago written by Trump in the aftermath of the alleged event.
