= Cynthia Szigeti =

American actress

Cynthia Szigeti

Cynthia Szigeti (October 26, 1949 – August 10, 2016) was an American comic actress and acting teacher, known for her work at the Groundlings, an improv and sketch comedy troupe and school in Los Angeles, and the ACME Comedy Theatre. Her students included Adam Carolla, Will Forte, Lisa Kudrow, Joel McHale, Conan O'Brien and Julia Sweeney. Her professional acting credits included National Lampoon's European Vacation, as well as roles in Seinfeld and Curb Your Enthusiasm.

== Early life ==
Szigeti went to Fairfax High School in Los Angeles. She later received her master's degree in acting from the University of California, Los Angeles (UCLA). Szigeti began her career by waitressing at the Pitchell Players improv club after graduating from UCLA. Her work at the club inspired her to enroll in improv classes at The Groundlings, the L.A. improv school, for $45 a month. Szigeti took the classes before successfully auditioning to become a full-time member of The Groundlings' main comedy troupe.

== Acting and improv career ==
Cynthia Szigeti eventually left The Groundlings for The Comedy Store, a comedy club in West Hollywood, where she joined The Comedy Store Players alongside Taylor Negron, Martin Short and Robin Williams. In a 2009 interview, Szigeti spoke of the differences between performing within the comedy troupes of The Groundlings versus The Comedy Club, saying, "At the Groundlings it was all about wigs, rehearsals and costumes. At the Store, it was immediate, topical and edgy."

During the 1980s, Szigeti returned to The Groundlings to run the school. She also continued to teach improv, as well as directing and overseeing the training of its acting teachers. The Los Angeles Times reported that she ran the Groundlings school for about six years before taking charge of the training program at the ACME Comedy Theatre, which she co-founded in 1989; by 1998, ACME's school had approximately 120 students. Describing her approach at ACME, Szigeti emphasized direct, hands-on instruction and encouraged students to perform at the highest level of their intelligence rather than appeal to the lowest common denominator. She later taught at Keep It Real Acting and UCLA Extension. In 1998, she was announced as one of the teachers for the third Big Stinkin' International Improv & Sketch Comedy Festival in Austin, Texas.

Szigeti's improv students at The Groundlings and the ACME Comedy Theatre included Adam Carolla, Will Forte, Joel McHale, Conan O'Brien, Cheri Oteri and Julia Sweeney. Lisa Kudrow recalled that when she first contacted The Groundlings after college, she was directed to study with Szigeti before auditioning for the school's classes. Kudrow later called Szigeti "the best thing that happened, on so many levels" and credited her with changing her perspective on acting. In a 2012 interview with the Archive of American Television, Kudrow explained that Szigeti taught students to produce emotion immediately in improvisation rather than gradually work toward it. Szigeti also encouraged Kudrow to create her first "dumb" or "airhead" character, an idea Kudrow had initially resisted.

Outside of improv, Szigeti accumulated her own numerous film and television credits, which spanned several decades. Her film credits included I Never Promised You a Rose Garden (1977), You Light Up My Life (1977), The Gong Show Movie (1980), Repo Man (1984), The Wrong Guys (1988) and Up Close and Personal (1996). Her television sitcom roles included WKRP in Cincinnati, Gimme a Break!, Married... with Children, Who's the Boss?, Empty Nest, The Norm Show, The King of Queens and Curb Your Enthusiasm (Season 1, Episode 10).

Most notably, Szigeti played Jerry Seinfeld's former high school girlfriend in a 1991 episode of Seinfeld called "The Library". In the episode, Seinfeld tracks down Szigeti's character to use her as an alibi for a borrowed book which he never returned to the New York Public Library.

== Death and legacy ==
Szigeti died from idiopathic pulmonary fibrosis at her home in Los Angeles on August 10, 2016, at the age of 66. Gunnar Todd Rohrbacher, an acting coach, founder of Actors Comedy Studio, and another of Szigeti's former students wrote a tribute to Szigeti, noting, "She was definitely intimidating, unapologetic, shockingly intelligent, generous, joyful and demanding... She would tell stories that included names like Bruce Springsteen, Robin Williams, Martin Short, Robert Redford and Helen Mirren. If you studied with her, your life was changed, and it was that simple."

== Filmography ==
- The Big Bus (1976) - Bus Passenger #21
- Prime Time a.k.a. American Raspberry (1977) - Dawn
- I Never Promised You a Rose Garden (1977) - Nurse
- You Light Up My Life (1977) - Cousin
- The Gong Show Movie (1980) - Diner Doll Sophie
- What's Up, Hideous Sun Demon (1983) - Nurse Darlene
- Repo Man (1984) - Deidre, U.F.O. Lady
- Johnny Dangerously (1984) - Mrs. Capone
- National Lampoon's European Vacation (1985) - Mrs. Froeger
- Hunk (1987) - Chachka
- The Wrong Guys (1988) - Spa Matron
- 976-EVIL (1988) - Female Operator
- A Sinful Life (1989) - Mrs. Crow
- Midnight Ride (1990) - Mrs. Egan
- Where the Day Takes You (1991) - Counselor
- Man of the Year (1995) - Betty Levy
- Beverly Hills 90210 (1995) - Madame Raven
- Up Close and Personal (1996) - Focus Group Member #6
- Nobody Knows Anything! (2003) - Jimmy's Mother
- Diamonds and Guns (2008) - Mrs. Antignatti
- Married With Children Season 07. Episode 16. - Bertha
