= The Dogwalker (1999 film) =

- Directed by: Paul Duran
- Written by: Paul Duran
- Produced by: Vera Anderson
- Starring: Will Stewart
- Cinematography: Dean Lent
- Edited by: Julie Rogers
- Music by: Joey Altruda
- Production companies: Rita Films; Soundelux Entertainment Group; Bouquet Multimedia
- Distributed by: Outrider Pictures
- Release date: 1999 (Karlovy Vary)
- Running time: 91 minutes 105 minutes
- Country: United States
- Language: English

The Dogwalker is a 1999 American romantic comedy-drama film written and directed by Paul Duran and starring Will Stewart.

== Cast ==
- Will Stewart as Jerry Cooper
- Nicki Aycox as Susan Shulte
- Carol Gustafson as Alma Mathers
- Walter Emanuel Jones as Blonde
- Stepfanie Kramer as Helen Shulte
- John Randolph as Ike Noodleman
- Allan Rich as Sam Steele
- Tony Todd as Mones
- Cress Williams as K.C.
- Stacey Williams as Darlene

== Release ==
The film premiered at the Karlovy Vary International Film Festival in 1999. Then it was released on September 13, 2002.

== Reception ==
The film has a 50% rating on Rotten Tomatoes based on ten reviews.

Lael Loewenstein of Variety gave the film a positive review, calling it "an indie that benefits from amusing characters, strong thesping and taut situational humor."

Manohla Dargis of the Los Angeles Times also gave the film a positive review and wrote, "Yet this isn’t a retooled genre piece, the tale of a guy and his gun, but an amiably idiosyncratic work..."

Pete Vonder Haar of Film Threat gave the film a mixed review and wrote that it "starts off strong, but loses steam towards the end."
