= Sideshow (2000 film) =

- Release poster
- Directed by: Fred Olen Ray
- Screenplay by: Benjamin Carr
- Produced by: Charles Band; Danny Draven; Gary Schmoeller
- Starring: Jamie Martz; Phil Fondacaro; Michael Amos; Jessi Keenan
- Cinematography: Mac Ahlberg
- Edited by: Steven Nielson
- Production company: Full Moon Pictures
- Distributed by: The Kushner-Locke Company
- Release date: July 11, 2000; (USA video premiere)
- Running time: 90 minutes
- Country: United States
- Language: English

Sideshow is a horror film from 2000 and released Full Moon Pictures directed by Fred Olen Ray.

== Plot ==
High school students visit a traveling carnival home to "unique" exhibits. They meet with a fortune teller who lets them in on what the future holds. One by one the teens get their desires but at a cost. Soon it becomes a battle for survival in hopes to not become a part of the show themselves.

== Cast ==
- Jamie Martz as Bobby
- Michael Amos as Tommy
- Scott McCann as Grant (credited as Scott Clark)
- Jessi Keenan as Melanie
- Phil Fondacaro as Abbot Graves
- Jeana Blackman as Jeanie
- Peter Spellos as Conjoin-O / Lester
- Luigi Francis Shorty Rossi as "Little Face"
- Curran Sympson as Aelita
- Fred Pierce as Hans / "Bug Boy"
- Shyra Deland as Digestina
- Ross Hagen as Sheriff
- Brinke Stevens as Madam Volosca
- Alicia McCutcheon as Hilda "The Faceless Girl"
- Richard Gabai as Agent

== Filming Locations ==
- Corriganville Movie Ranch, California
- Simi Valley, California

== Reception ==
The movie received rather poor reviews. Allmovie rated it 2 out of 5. TV Guide called it an "imbecilic chiller". Ain't It Cool News reviewed the film, stating that it was "a bit light on the story" and criticizing the teens' acting while praising the special effects.

Another reviewer wrote, "Like a lot of Full Moon pictures, this movie is surprisingly good despite its cheese. It has a story, it knows how to tell it, and the plot holes aren't overwhelming. They do cheese right. But it IS cheesy. Three out of five digested toasters."
