= Age of Love (TV series) =

2007 American reality television series

- Created by: J. D. Roth
- Starring: Mark Consuelos (Host); Mark Philippoussis
- Country of origin: United States
- Original language: English
- No. of seasons: 1
- No. of episodes: 8

Production
- Executive producer: Todd A. Nelson
- Running time: 60 minutes

Original release
- Network: NBC
- Release: June 18 – August 6, 2007

Age of Love is an American reality television dating series that ran for one season in 2007.

The show featured 30-year-old Australian tennis star Mark Philippoussis as he looked for love among a group of women ranging in age from their early 20s to their late 40s.

Hosted by Mark Consuelos, the series aired on NBC, premiered on Monday, June 18, 2007. The last episode aired on August 6, 2007, in which 25-year-old Amanda Salinas was chosen as the winner.

== Format ==
The contestants were divided in two age groups. The "kittens" were the women in their 20s, while the "cougars" were the women in their late 30s to late 40s. Each week Philippoussis would accompany one or two of the women on a private date, and at the end of each episode would ask all but one of the women if they would continue to see him. The rejected woman would be eliminated; this continued each week until just one remained. For the show's season finale, the final three contestants flew to Philippoussis' hometown of Melbourne, Australia to meet his family.

== Contestants ==
=== Kittens ===
Name	Age	Hometown	Occupation	Eliminated	Notes
Amanda Salinas	25	Nashville, TN	Hockey team dancer for Nashville Predators	Winner	Attending Middle Tennessee State University
Megan Klehr	21	Chicago, IL	Loyola University student	Episode 7	At the time of taping, ended a 10-month relationship
Mary Sanks	24	Albuquerque, NM	Hemodialysis Technician	Episode 5	Last serious relationship was at the age of 20
Tessa Walker	23	Peoria, AZ	Surgical Sales	Episode 4	
Adelaide Dawson	26	Manhattan Beach, CA	Editor for Esquire magazine	Episode 3	Born in Australia
Lauren Bryant	27	Greenwich, CT	Lighting consultant	Episode 2	Avid indoor rock climber

- ^1 Megan was chosen to be in Final 3 and on to the finale. On the finale, the girls and Mark had to take a plane to Australia to meet Mark's family. Megan was terrified of flying and refused to go on the plane, thereby eliminating herself from the competition.

=== Cougars ===
Name	Age	Hometown	Occupation	Eliminated	Notes
Jennifer Braff	48	Carson, CA	Executive assistant for the owner of the Los Angeles Lakers Spokesmodel, Amore Fashion	Finale (Runner up)	Was married twice (1979, 1999), 25-year-old son
Maria Rangel	42	Playa Del Rey, CA	Actress, Photographer	Episode 7	Married once, May 1989
Jayanna Howeton	39	Newport Beach, CA	Mortgage loan officer	Episode 6	Married once
Kelli Brook	40	Oceanside, CA	actress, legal secretary	Episode 4	former Los Angeles Raiderette
Lynn Borges	40	Nashville, TN	Makeup artist	Episode 3	Never married
Angela Harrington	40	Lakeside, MI	Property manager	Episode 2	Married twice (1987, 1993), 21-year-old son
Jodie Fisher	46	Dallas, TX	Vice president for a commercial real estate company	Episode 1	Married once June 1996, 8-year-old son

- ^2 Maria was shown in Episodes 4 and 6 as thinking of leaving. On Episode 7, when Mark asked Maria to stay, Maria told Mark she thought it wouldn't work out, which resulted in Maria eliminating herself.

=== Call-out order ===
Mark's call-out order
Order	Episodes							
Order	1	2	3	4	5	6	7	8
1		Adelaide	Amanda	Megan	Maria	Jennifer	Jennifer	Amanda
2		Tessa	Mary	Amanda	Megan	Amanda	Amanda	Jennifer
3		Amanda	Megan	Mary	Jayanna	Maria	Megan	
4		Megan	Tessa	Tessa	Amanda	Megan	Maria	
5		Mary	Adelaide	Maria	Jennifer	Jayanna		
6		Lauren	Kelli	Jennifer	Mary			
7	Kelli	Jayanna	Jayanna	Jayanna				
8	Jayanna	Jennifer	Jennifer	Kelli				
9	Maria	Kelli	Maria					
10	Lynn	Maria	Lynn					
11	Jennifer	Lynn						
12	Angela	Angela						
13	Jodie							

The contestant is in her 40s.
The contestant is in her 20s.
The contestant won the competition.
The contestant was eliminated by Mark.
The contestant decided to quit the competition.
The contestant was automatically eliminated as her fear of flying prevented her from going to Australia for the finale.

== Criticism ==
Critics noted Philippoussis was closer in age to the twenties than the forties. He was only three to nine years older than the "kittens", while nine to 18 years younger than all of the "cougars".

== Outcome ==
After the last episode of the show, Philippoussis refused to comment on the outcome of the relationship, stating that he was "concentrating on tennis". However, in a radio interview which aired on November 28 in Australia, he did state he was "currently single", and in February 2008 had been seen with model Siobhan Parekh. It was announced on October 26, 2009, that Philippousis was engaged to actress Jennifer Esposito, but had split by August 2010.

In 2009 it was revealed that Salinas and Philippoussis had stayed together for five months after meeting on the show. They split amicably in September 2007.

== International broadcasters ==
The opening episode of Age Of Love in Australia, screening at 8:30pm in NSW, ACT and QLD, and at 9:30pm in other states, only managed to rate 849,000 mainland capital city viewers, rating behind both Channel Nine and ABC. Two weeks later, it was moved to a later timeslot of 10:30pm as ratings dropped to 545,000 viewers. The rights for the show in the UK were snapped up by E4, the digital channel from Channel 4 and is shown as part of their "No-Brainers" season along with other American reality TV shows like The Simple Life and Beauty and the Geek.

== See also ==
- Who Wants to Marry a Multi-Millionaire? (2000)
- Flavor of Love (2006)
- Rock of Love with Bret Michaels (2007)
