= Shorty Rossi =

American actor

- Shorty Rossi at the 2012 Dallas Pet Expo.
- Born: Luigi Francis Rossi; February 10, 1969 (age 57); Los Angeles, California
- Citizenship: United States
- Occupations: Philanthropist, Bully Rights Activist, Cigar Blender, Author, Producer
- Years active: 1997–present
- Known for: Pit Boss
- Height: 122 cm (4 ft 0 in)

Luigi Francis "Shorty" Rossi (born February 10, 1969) is the star of the canceled Pit Boss, a reality series on Animal Planet. He is also the owner and talent manager of Shortywood Productions, a company that works with little people in the entertainment industry and Shorty's Rescue, an organization set up for Pit Bull rescue (which is no longer in service).

== Life and career ==
Rossi was born in Los Angeles, California. He was raised by his parents, also little people. During his childhood, he lived in two very disparate neighborhoods: the San Fernando Valley, a wealthy area in Greater Los Angeles, and Nickerson Gardens Housing Projects in Watts, a poor area in South Central Los Angeles, where he lived with a family friend to avoid conflict at home. By the age of 15, he was living on his own.

In 1987, Rossi graduated from Fremont High School. He joined the neighborhood Blood gang while living there. That year, he was involved in a gang-related shooting and convicted of felonies including attempted murder and assault with a deadly weapon. He was sent to the California Youth Authority and was later transferred to Folsom State Prison to serve a total sentence of 10 years, 10 months and 10 days.

Looking for a fresh start, Rossi turned to entertainment, soon learning he could earn good money as a little person in show business. His first job in the industry was at Universal Studios Hollywood, where he was "Alvin" for an Alvin and the Chipmunks stage show. Since then, he has appeared in many commercials and movies, the latter including The Grinch, with Jim Carrey; The Kid, with Bruce Willis. He has also appeared on dozens of TV shows and has performed in theater for years. In 2000, Rossi founded a company, Shortywood Productions, to provide little people entertainers for all types of shows, private parties and corporate events, and to manage their careers.

Since owning his first pit bull terrier at the age of 14, Rossi has championed the breed. This led him to form Shorty's Pit Bull Rescue, a second business that rescues, rehabilitates and places neglected and abused pit bulls in new homes. It also aims to restore the reputation of the breed through education, activism and positive pit bull involvement in the community. The dogs have been featured in student and short films as well as public-service commercials and print ads. The group does volunteer work by visiting nursing homes, schools, functions and hospitals. It caught the attention of cable TV network Animal Planet, leading to its continuing series "Pit Boss".

After injuring himself in a stunt, Rossi became interested in service animal training. One of his pit bulls has been involved in the Americans with Disabilities Act community ever since.

Shorty has written a tell-all memoir titled Four Feet Tall and Rising, which was released in 2012.

== Other legal troubles ==
During the filming of the 3rd-season premiere of Pit Boss, Shorty Rossi was arrested for breaking and entering after rescuing three neglected pit bulls from a vacant house. The charges were dismissed shortly thereafter when the owner of the dogs, who was on vacation in Europe and unaware that the person she had asked to care for her dogs had never shown up, proved grateful that Rossi had rescued the animals. This was shown in conversations with the owner in episodes 1 and 2.

== TV & filmography ==
Year	Film/TV series	Role	Notes
1997	Ally McBeal	Elf	Episode: Silver Bells (Uncredited Role)
1999	Shasta McNasty	Lil' Joe	Episode: The Menace from Venice (Credited as Melvin 'Shorty' Rossi)
1999	Popular	Elf Waiter	Episode: Fall On Your Knees (Uncredited Role)
2000	Los Luchadores	Lil' Wrestler	Episode: Pilot
2000	Disney's The Kid	Bully	Uncredited Role
2000	Sideshow	Little Face	Credited as Melvin 'Shorty' Rossi
2001	The Andy Dick Show	Mini-Andy	Episode: "Andy Land" (Credited as Melvin 'Shorty' Rossi)
2001	The Beast	Harry	Episode: The Price (Credited as Melvin 'Shorty' Rossi)
2001	Who Knows the Band	Himself (Guest appearance)	Episode dated October 30, 2001 (Credited as Melvin 'Shorty' Rossi)
2001	Call Me Claus	Garage Elf	TV film (Uncredited Role)
2002	Bikini Planet	Jerome	Credited as Melvin 'Shorty' Rossi
2002	The Nick Cannon Show	Himself/Skit'l	Episode: "Nick Takes Over Style" (Credited as Melvin 'Shorty' Rossi)
2002	The Nick Cannon Show	Himself/Skit'l	Episode: "Nick Takes Over Music" (Credited as Melvin 'Shorty' Rossi)
2002	Showtime	Martian	Uncredited Role
2002	Passions	Cigar Munchkin	Episode dated June 14, 2002 (Credited as Melvin 'Shorty' Rossi)
2003	El Matador	Shorty the Little Person	
2003	Tiptoes	Augie	
2004	Tales of a Fly on the Wall	Alien Brother-in-Law	TV film (Credited as Melvin 'Shorty' Rossi)
2005	All Babes Want to Kill Me	Thug/Gangster	Credited as Melvin 'Shorty' Rossi
2005	Half Pint Brawlers: Psycho Midget Wrestling	Himself	Video
2006	Zyles	Zyles	Short film (Credited as Melvin 'Shorty' Rossi)
2008	Ice Scream: The ReMix	Late Night Patron	
2008	Ryan and Sean's Not So Excellent Adventure	Ink	Credited as Melvin 'Shorty' Rossi
2008	Extreme Movie	Little Person #1	Credited as Melvin 'Shorty' Rossi
2009	WWE Raw	Little Peoples Court	Episode dated December 21, 2009
2010–2013	Pit Boss	Himself	TV series
2011	Hercules Saves Christmas	Hercules (voice); Brother Shorty	TV film
2020	Tres Peligrosos Compadres	Himself	Direct to Streaming Mexican Movie.
