= Plughead Rewired: Circuitry Man II =

- Directed by: Robert Lovy; Steven Lovy
- Written by: Robert Lovy; Steven Lovy
- Produced by: Steven Reich
- Starring: Jim Metzler; Deborah Shelton; Nicholas Worth; Vernon Wells; Traci Lords; Dennis Christopher
- Cinematography: Stephen Timberlake
- Edited by: David Dresher
- Music by: Tim Kelly
- Production companies: IRS Media; Trans Atlantic Entertainment
- Distributed by: IRS Media
- Release date: April 1994
- Running time: 93 minutes
- Country: United States
- Language: English

Plughead Rewired: Circuitry Man II is a 1994 American post-apocalyptic science fiction film written and directed by Steven Lovy and Robert Lovy, and starring Jim Metzler, Vernon Wells, Deborah Shelton, Dennis Christopher, Nicholas Worth and Traci Lords. It is the sequel to the 1990 cult classic movie Circuitry Man.

== Synopsis ==
In the backdrop of Earth's polluted future, a female FBI agent removes Danner, a pleasure android from an asylum to coerce him into helping her hunt down the criminal psychopath "Plughead". But Plughead, who has tangled with Danner before, has his own plans. He is forcing a female scientist to help him manufacture life extending longevity chips, which he intends to sell to rich and powerful clients.

== Cast ==
- Vernon Wells as "Plughead"
- Deborah Shelton as Kyle
- Jim Metzler as Danner
- Dennis Christopher as "Leech"
- Nicholas Worth as "Rock"
- Traci Lords as Norma
- Paul Willson as "Beany"
- Andy Goldberg as "Squid"
- Tom Kenny as "Guru"
- George Murdock as Senator Riley
- Bill Bolender as Private Richards
- George Buck Flower as Jerry
- Gigi Gaston as Rider

== Reception ==
Writing in Entertainment Weekly, J. R. Taylor rated it C− and wrote that the film recycles the plot from the first film, though he praised Metzler as "one of the more interesting genre guys around". Michael Weldon, author of The Psychotronic Video Guide, called it "an almost plotless, sometimes funny comedy sequel".
