= Gangster World =

- Screenplay by: Patrick Highsmith; Evan Spiliotopoulos
- Story by: Patrick Highsmith
- Directed by: David Bishop
- Starring: Xavier Declie
- Music by: Roger Neill
- Country of origin: United States
- Original language: English

Production
- Producer: Avi Nesher
- Cinematography: Irek Hartowicz
- Editor: Randell Vandegrift
- Running time: 91 minutes
- Production company: Conquistador Entertainment
- Budget: $3 million

Original release
- Release: March 15, 1997

Gangster World (alternatively titled The Outsider for its video release) is a 1997 made-for-TV science fiction film directed by David Bishop and written by Patrick Highsmith and Evan Spiliotopoulos. It was about a futuristic theme park in which people interact with androids in violent (and sometimes sexual) gangster-style scenarios. Despite the title and premise, it is unconnected with the film Westworld.

In 1998, a DVD was released of the film.

== Cast ==
- Xavier Declie as The Outsider
- Gabriel Dell Jr. as Garland Widmark
- Bridget Flanery as Lita Hayworth
- Stacey Williams as Astor
- David Leisure as Dr. Greenstreet
- Lindsey Ginter as Alan Houston
- Julia Dahl as Claire Arden
- Jerry Doyle as Rains
- Willy Leong as Lorre
- Randy Kovitz as Mason
- Bob Koherr as Rath
- Glenn Takakjian as Bone
- Jerry Spicer as Ladd
- Gail Thackray as Wubba Wubba Girl
- Michael Edwards as Frat Boy #1
- Paul Dallas as Frat Boy #2
- Jodie Fisher as Housewife
