= Blood Dolls =

1999 American direct-to-video film

- Release poster
- Directed by: Charles Band
- Written by: Charles Band
- Story by: Robert Talbot
- Produced by: Charles Band
- Starring: Jack Maturin; Debra Mayer; Nicholas Worth
- Cinematography: Tom Callaway
- Edited by: Steve Nielson
- Music by: Ricardo Bizzetti
- Distributed by: Multicom Entertainment Group Inc.; Full Moon Pictures
- Release date: August 30, 1999
- Running time: 84 minutes
- Country: United States
- Language: English
- Budget: $1,000,000

Blood Dolls is a 1999 direct-to-video comedy horror film written and directed by Charles Band. The film stars Jack Maturin, Debra Mayer, and Nicholas Worth. The story was conceived by Band (using the name Robert Talbot).

== Plot ==
Virgil Travis is a wealthy psychopath who lives in seclusion in his mansion with his little person butler, Hylas, and his murderous clown make-up-wearing henchman. Tortured and mutated as a child by a woman who put him through body transforming procedures, Virgil has an abnormally sized head. Basking in the suffering, degradation, and death of others, Virgil has already kidnapped an all-female rock group who he keeps imprisoned to satisfy his perverse amusement. He creates a trio of twisted living dolls (Pimp, Sideshow, and Ms. Fortune) to murder those who have wronged him. Virgil doesn't anticipate meeting his match and finding love, both of which come in the form of a woman who is even more evil and twisted than he.

The film has two different endings:

1. After his new wife sees his deformed head, she is horrified, so the dolls attack her while Virgil has the house filled with poison gas. Ms. Fortune frees the rock group, who escape with the dolls.
2. Rather than be disgusted, she finds him attractive for his evil and intellect. She then says that together, the world is theirs for the taking.

== Cast ==
- Jack Maturin as Virgil Travis
- Debra Mayer as Moira Yulin
- William Paul Burns as Mr. Mascaro
- Warren Draper as Harrison Yulin
- Nicholas Worth as George Warbeck
- Jodie Coady as Mercy Shaw
- Phil Fondacaro as Hylas
- Naomi McClure as Cindy Agami
- Jack Forbes as Squires
- Jason Pace as Howard Loftus
- J. Paradee as Shirley
- Venesa Talor as "Cotton Baby"
- Yvette Lera as "Razor Baby"
- Persia White as "Black Baby"
- Matt Corboy as Warbeck Security

== Release ==
Blood Dolls was released direct‑to‑video on VHS and DVD on August 31, 1999. A remastered Blu‑ray was released on August 12, 2025.

== Merchandising ==
In the VideoZone for the film, Charles Band stated that Full Moon was planning to release action figures of the dolls featured in Blood Dolls, including Pimp, Sideshow, and Ms. Fortune. Prototypes of these figures were shown at Toy Fair 2000 but these plans never materialized, except for a Pimp doll that was eventually released as part of Full Moon’s replica series in 2001. In 2025, the Pimp doll was reissued in a limited edition bundle with Blood Dolls′ Blu-ray release, with two hundred copies personally signed by Charles Band.

== Reception ==
Will Kouf of Silver Emulsion Film Reviews writes in his review:

Where do I start with this fucking movie? Blood Dolls goes the trashy route and does its best to shock and awe the viewer into liking it. It's truly a movie that will only appeal to the most demented group of people in the audience, which realistically is probably a large subset of the people who even give a shit about Full Moon movies. I unfortunately am not so keen on this particular brand of demented film, the "demented for the sake of being demented" variety.

== Documentary ==
A making-of documentary titled Hollywierd was directed by Penelope Spheeris in 1999. While the full documentary has never received a home media release, a six-minute excerpt is available to stream on the Full Moon Features app and is also included as a bonus feature on the film’s Blu-ray release.

== Music ==
Blood Dolls was originally planned in conjunction with music magnate Miles Copeland, and was to be hyped with a soundtrack album and concert tour for the sexy girl rockers who appear as secondary characters in the film but various difficulties caused this plan to collapse. Most songs in the movie are played by the fictional girls band called the CAGED BABYS but other than the main score composer Ricardo Bizzetti there are no music credits at all. However there's an official music video of one of the songs called PAIN performed by Go-Go's guitarist Jane Wiedlin, Alex Lloyd and Rick Astley.

== Legacy ==
William Paul Burns returned as Mr. Mascaro in the 2016 series Ravenwolf Towers.

== See also ==
- Killer toy
