= Phil Fondacaro =

American actor and stuntman (born 1958)

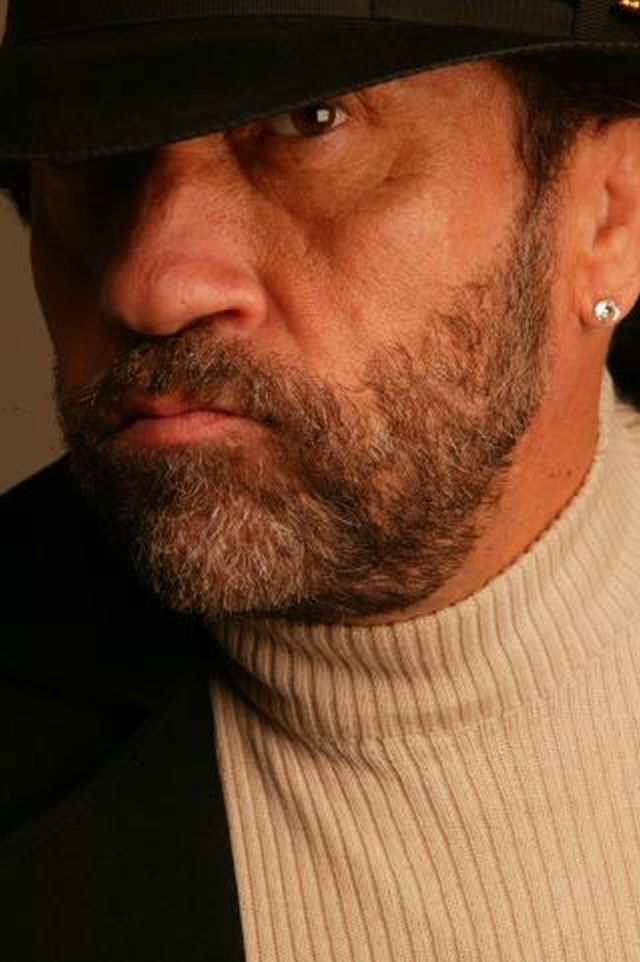
- Born: November 8, 1958 (age 67); New Orleans, Louisiana, U.S.
- Occupations: Actor, stuntman
- Years active: 1981–2009; 2024-present
- Height: 106 cm (3 ft 6 in)
- Spouse: Elena Bertagnolli (m. 2001)
- Children: 3

Phil Fondacaro (born November 8, 1958) is an American actor and stuntman. Standing 106 cm (3 ft 6 in), Fondacaro is best known for his performance in the horror comedy Bordello of Blood, as well as his roles in the fantasy films The Black Cauldron, Troll, Double, Double, Toil and Trouble, and Willow. He also had several prominent television roles, such as a recurring role as Roland on the television series Sabrina the Teenage Witch.

== Career ==
Fondacaro began acting in 1981, with the film Under the Rainbow. Fondacaro appeared in 1983's Return of the Jedi, the third Star Wars film, as an Ewok, the only one to have a death scene. In 1985, he voiced Creeper in Disney's The Black Cauldron. In 1986, he portrayed the invisible friend of a young Michael Gerber in the Disney Sunday movie Fuzzbucket, and also appeared in the fantasy film Troll. In 1987, he portrayed "Sir Nigel Pennyweight" in the cult horror film Ghoulies II. In the same year, he appeared as "Greaser Greg" in The Garbage Pail Kids Movie, a theatrical adaptation of the popular trading cards series, performing the character in a costume while voice actor Jim Cummings provided the voice, and he played the Devil's diminutive minion in The Yattering and Jack episode of Tales from the Darkside. In 1988's Willow, he appeared alongside Warwick Davis, one of his Star Wars co-stars.

Other prominent roles of Fondacaro's include "Hooded Dwarf" in Phantasm II, Cousin Itt in Addams Family Reunion, the villain's butler in Blood Dolls, the female vampire's "master" in the horror comedy Bordello of Blood, a shady con man in Land of the Dead, a vampire hunter in Decadent Evil, and a dramatic turn as a dwarf with an average-sized son in "A Clown's Prayer", an episode of Touched by an Angel. He also played a dwarf with an average-sized daughter in the CSI episode "A Little Murder". He also had a recurring role on Sabrina, the Teenage Witch as "Roland". He also starred in the 1993 children's film Double, Double, Toil and Trouble alongside Mary-Kate and Ashley Olsen, as Oscar.

== Personal life ==
Fondacaro is married to Elena Bertagnolli, who was the manager of late actor Verne Troyer. Fondacaro's brother Sal is also an actor, having appeared in Under the Rainbow, Return of the Jedi, and Invaders from Mars, all with his brother.

== Filmography ==
=== Film ===
Year	Title	Role	Notes
1981	Under the Rainbow	Hotel Rainbow Guest	
1983	Something Wicked This Way Comes	Demon Clown	Uncredited
1983	Return of the Jedi	Ewok	
1984	The Dungeonmaster	Stone Canyon People	
1985	The Black Cauldron	Creeper / Henchman	Voice
1985	Hard Rock Zombies	Mickey	
1985	American Drive-in	Rocky Magellan	
1986	Troll	Malcolm Mallory / Torok the Troll	
1986	Invaders from Mars	Drone	Uncredited
1987	Steele Justice	Dan	
1987	Ghoulies II	Sir Nigel Penneyweight	
1987	The Garbage Pail Kids Movie	Greaser Greg	
1988	Willow	Vohnkar	
1988	Phantasm II	Hooded Dwarf	Uncredited
1988	Memories of Me	Horace Bosco	
1988	I'm Gonna Git You Sucka	Evan's Brother	Uncredited
1989	Monster High	Stinksucker	
1989	Nerds of a Feather	Little Army	
1990	Meridian: Kiss of the Beast	Dwarf	
1990	Night Angel	Sammael	
1990	Midnight Cabaret	Dwarf	
1991	The Doors	Man at Birthday Party	Uncredited
1993	Dollman vs. Demonic Toys	Ray Vernon	
1993	Double, Double, Toil and Trouble	Oscar	
1995	The Nature of the Beast	Harliss	
1996	Hellraiser: Bloodline	Surgeon – The Jester	Uncredited
1996	Bordello of Blood	Vincent Prather	
1996	The Elevator	Dwarf Rabbi	
1997	The Creeps (aka Deformed Monsters)	Dracula	
1998	Sweet Jane	Bob	
1999	Blood Dolls	Hylas	
2000	The Gentleman Bandit	Seedy Hotel Manager	
2000	Sideshow	Abbot Graves	
2001	The Theory of the Leisure Class	Millionaire	
2004	The Polar Express	Elf	Voice
2005	Land of the Dead	Chihuahua	
2005	Decadent Evil	Ivan	
2006	Evil Bong	Club Patron	
2009	Immortally Yours	Michael Bates	
2024	Watchmen Chapter Two	Tom Ryan / Big Figure	Voice; direct-to-video

=== Television ===
Year	Title	Role	Notes
1983, 1984	Faerie Tale Theatre	Bernard / Munchkin	2 episodes
1985	Condor	Quaid	Television film
1986	The Magical World of Disney	Fuzzbucket	Episode: "Fuzzbucket"
1987	Tales from the Darkside	The Yattering	Episode: "The Yattering and Jack"
1987	Thirtysomething	Anxiety	Episode: "Nice Work If You Can Get It"
1989	Superboy	Alien	Episode: "Nightmare Island"
1990	Quantum Leap	Big Moe	Episode: "Leaping in Without a Net"
1990	Married... with Children	Alien	Episode: "Married... with Aliens"
1991	Brotherhood of the Gun	Antonio	Television film
1992	Mann & Machine	Dwarf Thug	Episode: "Prototype"
1992	Renegade	Little Tom Masion	Episode: "Payback"
1992	Tequila and Bonetti	Big Eddie	Episode: "Mama"
1993	Johnny Bago	Little Man	Episode: "Big Top Bago"
1993	Tales from the Crypt	Emmet	Episode: "Food for Thought"
1993	Double, Double, Toil and Trouble	Oscar	Television film
1993, 1994	Northern Exposure	Green Man	2 episodes
1995	Medicine Ball	Mr. Stratten	Episode: "Wizard of Bras"
1996, 1999	Sliders	Mac / Bounty Hunter	2 episodes
1997–2000	Sabrina the Teenage Witch	Roland	5 episodes
1998	Addams Family Reunion	Cousin Itt	Television film
1998	Hercules	Additional voices	2 episodes
1999	The Pretender	Doorman	Episode: "Road Trip"
2000	Touched by an Angel	Leroy Tucker	Episode: "A Clown's Prayer"
2000	The War Next Door	Gerald Soloman	Episode: "Blood Is Thicker Than Death"
2000	Walker, Texas Ranger	Big Hack	Episode: "Lazarus"
2000	Daddio	Christmas Elf	Episode: "A Christmas Quarrel"
2002	Passions	Trenchcoat Munchkin	Episode #1.754
2002	CSI: Crime Scene Investigation	Kevin Marcus	Episode: "A Little Murder"
2003	10-8: Officers on Duty	Brian's Father	Episode: "Let It Bleed"
