= Pit Boss (TV series) =

American television series

- Also known as: Pit Boss XL
- Starring: Shorty Rossi; Ashley Brooks; Ronald Lee Clark; Sebastian Saraceno
- Theme music composer: Keith Mansfield
- Opening theme: "Funky Fanfare"
- Country of origin: United States
- Original language: English
- No. of seasons: 6
- No. of episodes: 53

Production
- Production locations: Various, but mostly in Los Angeles, California
- Running time: 60 minutes
- Production company: Intuitive Entertainment

Original release
- Network: Animal Planet
- Release: January 16, 2010 – March 30, 2013

Pit Boss is an American television series docudrama that follows Shorty Rossi, owner of Shorty's Rescue, an organization set up for Pit Bull rescue. The series aired on Animal Planet from January 16, 2010 to March 30, 2013.

== Information ==
Shorty Rossi, a talent manager of Shortywood Productions, developed a passion for pit bulls when he was a teenager. Because of this, he created "Shorty's Rescue." Its main purpose: to rescue and rehabilitate pit bulls, the most misunderstood breed of dogs in the Greater Los Angeles area. Shorty enlisted the help of Sebastian, Ashley, and Ronald. Throughout the series, Shorty and his crew overcome many perils while carrying out their rescue efforts. Shorty's Rescue relies heavily on donations, so they host car washes, pet expos, etc., to raise money. In the season 6 finale, they return to discover that Shortywood's client roster has been destroyed by a rival talent agency.

== Episodes ==
=== Series overview ===
Season	Episodes	Season premiere	Season finale
1	6	January 16, 2010	February 27, 2010
2	14	July 17, 2010	October 23, 2010
3	8	January 29, 2011	March 26, 2011
4	7	July 16, 2011	August 27, 2011
5	6	January 14, 2012	February 18, 2012
6	12	January 5, 2013	March 30, 2013

=== Season 1 (2010) ===
No. overall	No. in season	Title	Original release date	Enhanced XL release date
1	1	"Dogged Pursuit"	January 16, 2010	June 5, 2010
Shorty Rossi, an ex-con who runs a talent-management company, and his friends rescue and rehabilitate pit bulls in Los Angeles. In the series opener, Shorty runs into trouble while trying to find an abandoned dog's owner.
2	2	"The Big Dog Is Back"	January 23, 2010	June 12, 2010
Shorty retrieves a mistreated American Pit Bull Terrier from its negligent owner. Later, he tries to rescue a dog about to be euthanized at a shelter.
3	3	"All in the Family"	January 30, 2010	June 19, 2010
The team tries to help a man who is struggling to make ends meet keep his pooch. Meanwhile, Ronald is unhappy about a job that involves wearing a crawfish costume.
4	4	"Home Sweet Home"	February 13, 2010	July 5, 2010
Actress Linda Blair helps Shorty after he rescues 10 puppies; the team has difficulty finding a home for a rambunctious pit bull terrier.
5	5	"Ashley's Big Adventure"	February 20, 2010	July 5, 2010
An abandoned American pit bull is left at Shorty's office and Ashley tries to find a home for it. Meanwhile, Shorty takes his dog to an audition and must convince the director that a pit bull can play the role.
6	6	"The Biggest Little Car Wash"	February 27, 2010	July 5, 2010
In the first-season finale, Shorty organizes a fund-raiser to offset the cost of his dog rescues. Elsewhere, Ronald loses his cool with an acting coach.

=== Season 2 (2010) ===
No. overall	No. in season	Title	Original release date
7	1	"The Boss Is Back"	July 17, 2010
Shorty and his staff settle into their new offices, then probe the case of a stray pit bull that may have been involved in dog fighting, causing Shorty to break one of his own rules.
8	2	"Shorty Goes Medieval"	July 24, 2010
When animal control threatens to take an American Pit Bull Terrier from a Long Beach trucking employee, Shorty intervenes in an attempt to help; Sebastian joins Ronald in working with the aggressive acting coach; the crew is tapped to work the Renaissance Fair.
9	3	"Surprise, Surprise"	July 31, 2010
Sebastian, Ronald and Ashley volunteer at an animal shelter and rescue a pit bull from being euthanized; a soldier's pit bull is confiscated; Ashley explores her comedic interest at an area comedy club; Shorty plans Ashley and Ronald's birthday bash.
10	4	"Breaking Away"	August 7, 2010
Ronald, Sebastian, Ashley and Hercules audition for film roles that require little people and dogs; Sebastian ponders his future when his girlfriend, Shea visits; Shorty and Ashley provide assistance for an abused pit bull in need of medical help.
11	5	"Show Me the Money"	August 14, 2010
Shorty complains of back pain, then goes on the radio to set the record straight about Pits; Hercules is given a gig that no one in the staff agrees with; staff members auction themselves to raise money at the Pet Expo.
12	6	"Shorty's Family Reunion"	August 21, 2010
Shorty is inspired to contact his adoptive family after he helps a 14-year-old in his efforts to persuade a neighbor to neuter his dog; Ashley seeks advice from professional comic James Davis on perfecting her stand-up routine.
13	7	"Breeders and Followers"	August 28, 2010
Shorty finds an abandoned dog in a high-end foreclosed home; Ashley books a gig; Sebastian moves into his new apartment.
14	8	"Shorty Knows Best"	September 11, 2010
Shorty and his team get an emergency phone call about a pit bull locked inside an abandoned car; Ronald's best friend from college visits and they share a week of partying and fun.
15	9	"Smackdown!"	September 18, 2010
A parolee from Utah has to choose between saving his family pit bull and going back to jail. Shorty, Sebastian, and Ronald teams up with an MMA club to promote an anti-dogfight campaign.
16	10	"The Seventh Dwarf"	September 25, 2010
Shorty and his team help save a pit bull and a dalmatian tied to a post in LA's Skid Row.
17	11	"Back Behind Bars"	October 2, 2010
Shorty returns to the California Youth Authority, a juvenile reform facility where he once stayed.
18	12	"Great Balls of Fire"	October 9, 2010
Shorty searches for a stray pit bull and find a surprise when looking for the animal in an RV yard; Ashley consults a booking agent about the future of her career in comedy; Sebastian performs a fire-breathing stunt during a luau.
19	13	"The Great Escape"	October 16, 2010
Shorty surprises his staff with an R & R trip to Mexico, but the fun is cut short when one of Shorty's pit bulls, Dominico, goes missing.
20	14	"So Long, Shorty"	October 23, 2010
A dangerous dog rescue leaves Shorty hurt, and his sister rushes to his bedside. Also, due to acting classes, Ronald quits working for Shorty.

=== Season 3 (2011) ===
No. overall	No. in season	Title	Original release date	Enhanced XL release date
21	1	"Shorty Breaks In"	January 29, 2011	March 12, 2011
Shorty goes to extreme measures to save three pit bulls trapped in a house. Meanwhile, Sebastian and Ashley strive to perform at their best after Ronald walks out.
22	2	"The Showdown"	February 5, 2011	March 12, 2011
Six rescued pit bulls are living in crates in the Shortywood office as Shorty feels extreme pressure to secure their placement in foster homes as soon as possible in order to stave off an upheaval among the members of his staff.
23	3	"Pit Bulls & Paintball"	February 12, 2011	February 19, 2011
Shorty and Sebastian experience a harrowing encounter with a group of wayward teenagers that uses stray dogs for target practice with their paintball guns as their attempts to stop it cause the situation to spiral out of control. Meanwhile, Shorty searches for a new employee for Shortywood.
24	4	"Shorty Goes Home"	February 19, 2011	February 26, 2011
Shorty reunites with his estranged parents in Texas, but the outcome isn't exactly what he anticipated; Sebastian takes part in a troublesome rescue that ultimately leaves him and five pit bull puppies in an uncomfortable predicament, and enlists Ronald's help. Ronald makes a compelling argument to Shorty about why he deserves to have his job back.
25	5	"The Prodigal Son Returns"	February 26, 2011	March 5, 2011
Shorty rehires Ronald, which is upsetting to Amanda; Shorty and his crew must work within a limited time frame to save an injured pit bull; Amanda has goofed on her casting video auditions; Ashley enters a comedy competition.
26	6	"Little Chippendales"	March 5, 2011	March 19, 2011
Amanda books a major gig for Shortywood that involves Ronald and Sebastian participating in the famous Chippendales male dance revue, but they must get waxed before they can attend rehearsals; Shorty visits the pet resort at which he used to work.
27	7	"Shorty the Ghostbuster"	March 19, 2011	March 26, 2011
A pet owner wants to adopt one of Shorty's pit bulls, but she would first like for Shorty to join her in a séance to ask if her deceased dog approves; Ronald rushes back to his hometown to spend time with his ailing parents.
28	8	"Shorty's Confession"	March 26, 2011	June 16, 2011
To rescue group owner Shorty Rossi's disappointment, he has acquired an abundance of pit bulls, and is extremely unsuccessful when he attempts to find a sufficient number of quality homes for all of the canines he has rescued.

=== Season 4 (2011) ===
No. overall	No. in season	Title	Original release date	Enhanced XL release date
29	1	"Dreams Come True"	July 16, 2011	July 23, 2011
A nighttime rescue in a deserted building in downtown Los Angeles goes horribly wrong when Sebastian is not able to hear Shorty's shouts for assistance; Shorty and his team go to great lengths to fulfill a young Make-A-Wish Foundation recipient's wish.
30	2	"Death in Denver"	July 23, 2011	August 27, 2011
Shorty goes to Denver to try to change the minds of lawmakers who have passed breed-specific legislation that bans pit bulls from being inside the city limits; Shorty helps reunite a pit bull owner with her dogs and joins a nonviolent protest.
31	3	"Pit Bulls and Pinot Noir"	July 30, 2011	August 27, 2011
Shorty and his team help raise money for an impounded dog in serious need of a leg operation; Shorty attempts to convince the owners of three abused pit bulls to surrender their dogs; Ashley gets stage fright prior to her improvisational performance.
32	4	"Bad Owners, Mad Neighbors"	August 6, 2011	August 27, 2011
Shorty goes on a rescue by himself to save a friend's trapped pit bull, and he comes face-to-face with an irritated neighbor who is not fond of the breed; Sebastian and Ronald are given the opportunity to co-star in a major motion picture; Ashley gets stage fright prior to her improvisational performance.
33	5	"For Our Fans"	August 13, 2011	
A "Best Of" special episode that takes a look back at some memorable moments from the series. In addition to highlights, Shorty and his crew share outtakes, bloopers and unseen footage from action-packed rescues.
34	6	"The Betrayal"	August 20, 2011	August 27, 2011
Shorty renews his commitment to hold a series of frequent pit bull-only adoption events. Meanwhile, Sebastian books a secret entertainment gig on the side to help pay for his new hearing aids and convinces Ronald and Ashley to help out.
35	7	"Separate Ways"	August 27, 2011	
Shorty's angry confrontation with Sebastian leaves everyone at Shortywood reeling. Meanwhile, Sebastian and Ronald get cast as actors in the opportunity of a lifetime, and consider leaving Shorty's Rescue for good.

=== Season 5 (2012) ===
No. overall	No. in season	Title	Original release date
36	1	"Trouble in Shortywood"	January 14, 2012
Shorty and Ashley call on Hercules to find a puppy locked in a car before time runs out; a rescue in a graveyard goes terribly wrong, and Shorty's new employees are caught in a deadly situation.
37	2	"Crossroads"	January 21, 2012
Shorty and his new rescue crew hear about a stranded pit bull In a train yard and spring into action; choppy water and a drifting houseboat put an operation and lives in peril; Ashley attempts to convince Ronald and Sebastian to return to Shorty's Rescue.
38	3	"Mending Fences"	January 28, 2012
Sebastian goes on a rescue mission at a horse stable in hopes of repairing his damaged relationship with Shorty; a situation gets out of hand when a pit bull faces off with an agitated mare; Ashley tries to show Shorty that she can be a good manager.
39	4	"When Good Rescues Go Bad"	February 4, 2012
Shorty Rossi and Sebastian Saraceno's lives are in danger when a seemingly normal rescue that involves a severely abused pit bull goes wrong; Shorty learns that pit bull is terminally ill, and he faces a devastating decision.
40	5	"Four Feet Tall and Rising"	February 18, 2012
Ashley returns from a trip to Maryland and decides to step up her game by booking a big-time client, but when she lands the gig, it jeopardizes her friendship with Mikey; Shorty visits his sister and breaks big news about his upcoming tell-all book.
41	6	"The Roast"	February 18, 2012
Shorty is determined to help financially strapped Dawn with a rescue; Shorty volunteers to raise money by appearing as the guest of honor at a roast; Shorty has no idea what is in store for him when he takes center stage with Ashley performing. Shorty Goes back to the L.A. River to save a stranded pit bull that is chained up.

=== Season 6 (2013) ===
No. overall	No. in season	Title	Original release date
42	1	"When the Pit Boss is Away..."	January 5, 2013
Shorty and Hercules hit the road to promote pit bull tolerance and his new book, but Shorty ponders what being an open book to the world will mean to his family. Ashley is left in charge but it's possible that the power may be going to her head.
43	2	"Shorty's Master Plan"	January 12, 2013
Shorty may expand his operation after a local rescue refuses to take in pit bulls; Ashley gets the chance to show growth as a manager when a deal goes bad. Seb wants to devote more time to pit bulls, but Ronald is still fixed on stardom.
44	3	"Racetrack Rescue"	January 19, 2013
Shorty has a new pit bull kennel up and running but he may have underestimated how much hard work there was to be done and what kind of shape he was in to do it. Ashley feels she needs to devote her time to the talent-agency and not the kennel.
45	4	"Dog Days at Shortywood"	January 26, 2013
Shorty gets a little person he's mentoring to help out at the kennel when things get a bit strained. Shorty takes risks to rescue a pit bull trapped in an abandoned house. Ashley gets in trouble for going over budget on a commercial for Shortywood.
46	5	"Clash of the Titans"	February 2, 2013
Shorty attempts a risky rescue at a farm and must take Ashley because the businesses are understaffed and Sebastian is leaving to visit his family. Ashley fusses at Shorty for ignoring the business when Ron doesn't show up for a big gig she booked.
47	6	"The Boiling Point"	February 9, 2013
Shorty volunteers Ronald and Sebastian for an L.A. Animal Rescue benefit without telling them the event is a drag-queen bingo. Ashley and Shorty seem to stay at odds over the mission and Shortywood and Ashley is faced with a major decision.
48	7	"Everybody's Changing"	February 23, 2013
Ashley decides to leave Shortywood which leaves Shorty with the enormous task of replacing her, and the interview process is already taking a wrong turn. Ashley books her final job at Shortywood but the client makes a difficult request.
49	8	"Goodbye, Ashley"	March 2, 2013
Shorty and his staff are forced to spend a night at a campground in the wilderness when the rescue of a stray pit bull takes longer than they anticipated; Shortywood puts on a variety show to help with dog adoptions but the headliner is a no-show.
50	9	"Barely Staying Afloat"	March 9, 2013
As Ashley adjusts to her new job as talent agent for the Sid Levine Talent Agency, Ron and Sebastian struggle to fill in for her at the Shortywood offices and on rescues, but sadly Shorty is no help as he attends his niece's graduation ceremony.
51	10	"Shorty is Betrayed"	March 16, 2013
Shortywood gigs are suffering, but even though Ron and Sebastian are stretched thin at the office, they hope to turn things around at a music video shoot until they get there and realize Ashley has stolen the star they booked to perform.
52	11	"Things Get Ugly"	March 23, 2013
Ashley deals with guilt when Shorty confronts her boss at Sid Levine Talent Agency about her stealing talent from the Shortywood roster and things get a little rough. Shorty needs help with the rescue of an abandoned dog at a construction site.
53	12	"The End of Shortywood?"	March 30, 2013
Shorty and his staff shine at a rally where they garner support and help repeal bans against pit bulls residing within Miami-Dade city limits. Ashley tries to smooth things with Shorty, but on his return he finds that Shortywood Productions has been practically destroyed by a rival talent agency.

== Former staff ==
Amanda – Fired at the end of "Little Chippendales" due to her dishonesty about being a dog person in her job interview.

Ronald (Returned) – Ronald quit Shorty's Rescue for acting classes, can be seen in the episode "So Long, Shorty". Returned after helping the team in a rescue when Amanda would not help. Ronald left briefly with Sebastian to pursue an acting career in the movie Mirror, Mirror. Months later, he returned to help in future rescues.

Sebastian (Returned) – During Season 4 when Sebastian needed $20,000 for medical expenses, he didn't want to ask Shorty for help so he started secretly working side jobs in his time off. However, when he booked a live event, the type of work usually booked through Shortywood, through a contact who was a former Shortywood client and Shorty found out, Shorty felt he could no longer trust Sebastian and fired him at the end of "The Betrayal." At the end of the "Crossroads" episode, Sebastian was rehired after the first few rescues on season 5 went from bad to worse.

Steven (Returned) – Resigned during the episode "Mending Fences". He has reappeared (rarely) in one or more episodes in season 6.

Ashley – Resigned (gives two weeks' notice) during the episode "Everybody's Changing" and she returns in "The End of Shortywood?".

== Newer staff ==
Christan – Helper of the Shortywood Dog Rescue Kennel. He is a newer volunteer.
