= ACME Comedy Theatre =

Theater in Los Angeles

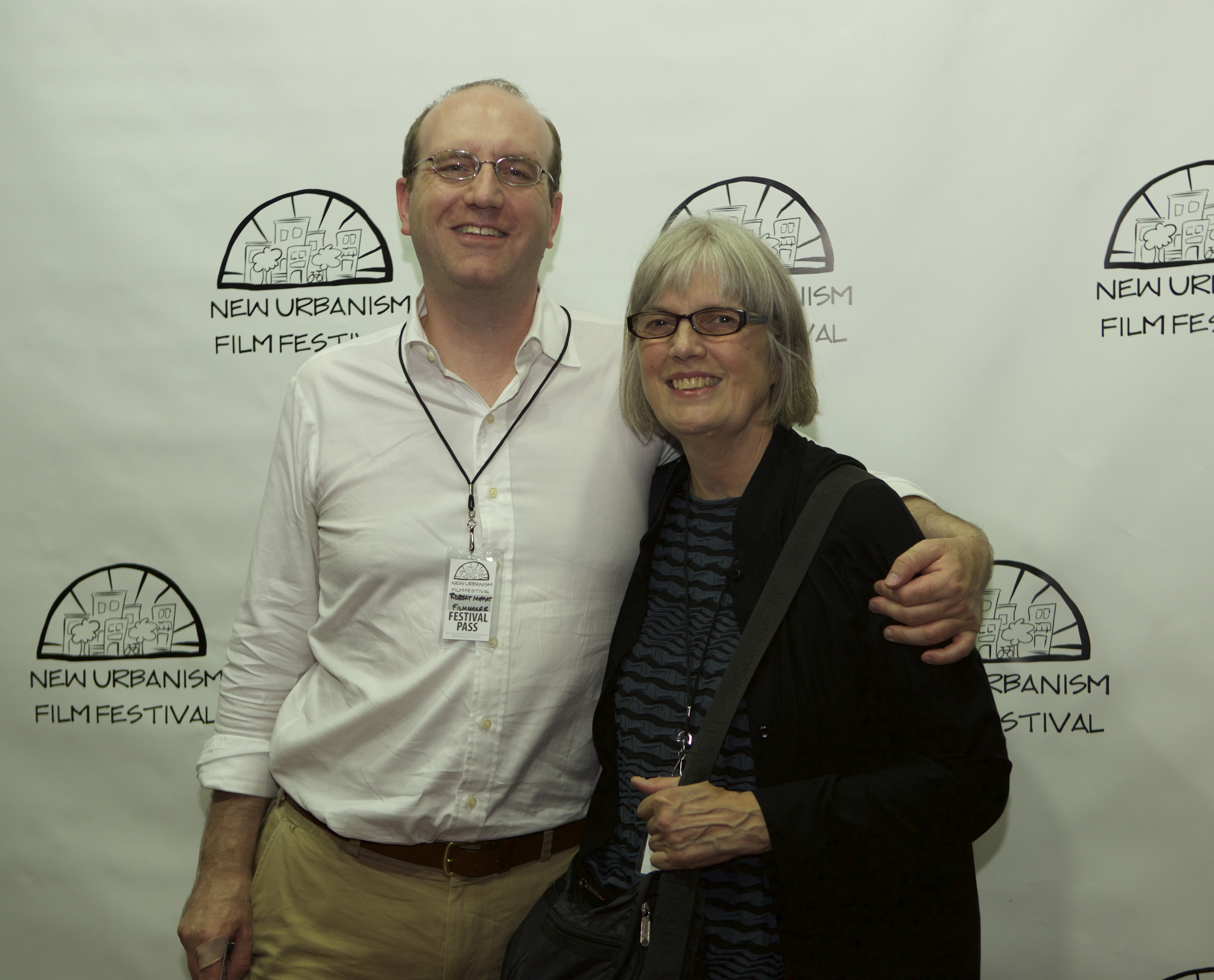
- The 3rd annual New Urbanism Film Festival was held at the Acme Comedy Theater in West Hollywood.
- Location: Hollywood, Los Angeles, California
- Seating type: Reserved
- Type: Indoor theatre

Website
- www.acmecomedy.com

The ACME Comedy Theatre is an American sketch comedy and improvisational theater located near Hollywood, Los Angeles, California, on La Brea near Wilshire's "Miracle Mile".

ACME was started by M.D. Sweeney as "The Two Roads Theater" in Studio City in 1989 with Cynthia Szigeti. The players known as the Two Roads Players and later the Tujunga Group. Sweeney changed the name to Acme a few years later, a reference to Warner Brothers cartoons (Sweeney assisted with some Tiny Toons scripts to help his writer girlfriend out) around the same time he moved the theater to North Hollywood. Eventually, he brought it to La Brea Boulevard near Los Angeles's "Miracle Mile", where it quickly rose to prominence in the world of sketch comedy. Sweeney was inspired by the Groundlings, and throughout the 1990s, a rivalry developed between ACME and the famous Groundlings, with both theaters vying for the best sketch comedians in Los Angeles. (Sweeney's girlfriend—the mother of his children, Sherri Stoner—is a former Groundling. The name "Acme" was selected after Stoner's career in animation writing at Warner Brothers had started to take off.)

In 2004, Sweeney decided to retire from directing and sold ACME to Travis Oates, then a member of ACME's main sketch company. Oates embarked on a renovation of the theater that made ACME the most technically advanced 99-seat theater in Los Angeles. In the first quarter of 2007 ACME underwent a second major renovation, which saw the installation of broadcast equipment and effectively turned ACME into a television soundstage. ACME is now the only sketch comedy theater to broadcast all its shows live on the internet.

After a period of inactivity, ACME began hosting a sketch night on Sunday evenings. Beginning in March 2018, ACME hosted the house sketch teams from the recently closed iO West Theatre, as well as the long running current events show Top Story Weekly.

== Notable alumni ==
- Cecily Adams
- Greg Benson
- Alex Borstein MADtv cast member
- Adam Carolla
- Felicia Day
- Jackson Douglas
- Ralph Garman
- Fred Goss
- Maz Jobrani
- Jamie Kaler
- Jessica Kiper
- Lisa Kushell MADtv cast member
- Jerry Lambert
- Jeff Lewis
- John P. McCann
- Joel McHale
- Paul Rugg
- Wil Wheaton
