= The Creeps (film) =

- DVD cover
- Directed by: Charles Band
- Written by: Benjamin Carr
- Starring: Rhonda Griffin; Justin Lauer; Bill Moynihan; Kristin Norton; Jon Simanton; Joe Smith; Phil Fondacaro
- Cinematography: Adolfo Bartoli
- Edited by: Steven Nielson
- Music by: Carl Dante
- Production companies: Full Moon Pictures; Tanna Productions
- Distributed by: The Kushner-Locke Company
- Release date: December 16, 1997 (US)
- Running time: 80 minutes
- Country: United States
- Language: English

The Creeps is a 1997 American comedy horror film, written by Benjamin Carr and directed by Charles Band and released by Full Moon Pictures.

== Plot ==
A woman named Anna Quarrels works in the Rare Books Room of a library. A man approaches her, introducing himself as Mr. Jamison from the University of Chicago. He supposedly wishes to study Frankenstein's original manuscript. After reading it, Jamison steals the manuscript.

Anna hires private detective David Raleigh to track Jamison down. David soon discovers that the man claiming to be Jamison is really Dr. Winston Berber, a scholar with doctorates in Physics, Mathematics, Folklore, and Philosophy. Berber collects rare original manuscripts; along with Frankenstein, he has obtained The Werewolf of Paris and The Mummy. He now seeks the first edition of Dracula. Berber has invented an "Archetype Inducer" and plans to use the manuscripts to bring the four greatest monsters from horror history to life and control them.

Berber eventually returns to the library, looking for the first edition of Dracula. Anna holds him at bay with a pair of scissors and phones David. Before David can arrive, Berber zaps Anna with a taser. He then both takes the Dracula manuscript and Anna to his laboratory.

Anna is handcuffed to a table. Berber says that she is just what he needs: a virgin between the ages of 20 and 35 to be sacrificed naked to make the Archetype Inducer work. After finding Beber's address, David breaks into the lab. He overcomes Berber and releases Anna. She grabs the manuscripts, and the two leave the lab. However, Berber had already turned on the Archetype Inducer.

While David and Anna are making their escape, the four monsters step out of the machine. The Mummy, Frankenstein's monster, The Wolfman, and Dracula, however, are all midgets. Berber says that the monsters can be increased in stature if they can recapture Anna.

David later demands $6,200 to Anna for his services. The monsters later kidnap her supervisor Miss Christina, thinking that she is Anna. At the lab, they understand their mistake. Dracula, however, forces Berber to try the procedure with Christina. The experiment does not work.

Dracula later fails to get Anna's address from David and tries to bite his neck. David exposes his crucifix and races out the door. Assuming that he will lead them to Anna, the monsters and Berber follow as David goes to the library. There, the monsters capture Anna and David.

At the lab, Berber finds out that Anna is not a virgin. Dracula suggests that they should find another virgin to go through the procedure, but Berber says that that will unbalance things. The only way to keep everything balanced is to find a virgin male. After asking, Dracula is assured that David is indeed a virgin.

While the human sacrifice is being prepared, Anna points out to the monsters that they will eventually die if they stay in the real world as all humans do. But if they return to their respective novels, they will live on forever. While David and Anna escape from their cuffs, Berber starts his machine. Christina then reappears as a Viking, grabs Berber, and disappears with him. Anna and David conclude that the machine turned the two into archetypes of a Viking and a mad scientist. After pondering about what Anna said, the monsters tell David to start the machine again. The four are sucked back into their respective novels.

Anna later gives David a check for $6,200 and informs him that Berber's lab has been torn down. She also gives him a book, the first English language edition of Venus in Furs. David, a cinephile, starts droning on about the book's various film adaptations and the people who worked on them, until Anna interrupts him with a kiss.

== Cast ==
- Rhonda Griffin as Anna Quarrels
- Justin Lauer as David Raleigh
- Bill Moynihan as Winston Berber
- Kristin Norton as Miss Christina
- Jon Simanton as Wolfman
- Joe Smith as Mummy
- Thomas Wellington as Frankenstein's Monster
- Phil Fondacaro as Dracula
- J.W. Perra as Video Store Customer
- Andrea Harper as Stella, Video Store Clerk

== Production ==
The Creeps came about from Charles Band's previous experiences of movies centered around little people like Dollman and Puppet Master which in turn spurred the idea of making a movie centered around tiny versions of famous movie monsters such as Dracula, Frankenstein, The Wolf Man, and The Mummy which Band thought was an intriguing enough idea that it would catch attention on video store shelves. The film was given a limited theatrical run in Halloween 1997 as a 3D film which would be released flat once on home video as home TVs at the time didn't have a sharp enough image to convey 3D.

== Reception ==
Critical reception for The Creeps has been mixed. Fangoria wrote that the film is "moderately successful" and "one of things to The Creeps' credit is that while the filmmakers do indulge in the 'minuscule monster' angle, the movie doesn't sink to a series of tasteless short jokes or repetitive and sophomoric humorless indignities aimed at the diminutive actors." HorrorTalk commented that "No matter how you look at it, The Creeps is a bad movie" but that "Regardless of the minefield of faults, in the right hands The Creeps can be an entertaining film. It certainly isn't the Monster Squad meets Time Bandits you may have envisioned, but the special effects required some effort to produce and corners were definitely not cut." A reviewer for the British Fantasy Society also praised the film and wrote that it was "light, fun and a good chuckle throughout."

Keith Phipps wrote for The A.V. Club, "There's something embarrassingly entertaining about a three-foot-high werewolf, but that and a genuinely strong performance by veteran little-person actor Phil Fondacaro as Dracula are pretty much the extent of The Creeps' charms." While he wrote that the film was not funny and not scary, he qualified it was "far from unwatchable, and if you really need a cheesy horror movie, especially one with tiny monsters, you could do a lot worse."

Steve Miller heavily criticized the film in his book 150 Movies You Should Die Before You See, as he felt that the film was homophobic and made fun of people with dwarfism.
