= Dennis Christopher =

American actor (born 1950)

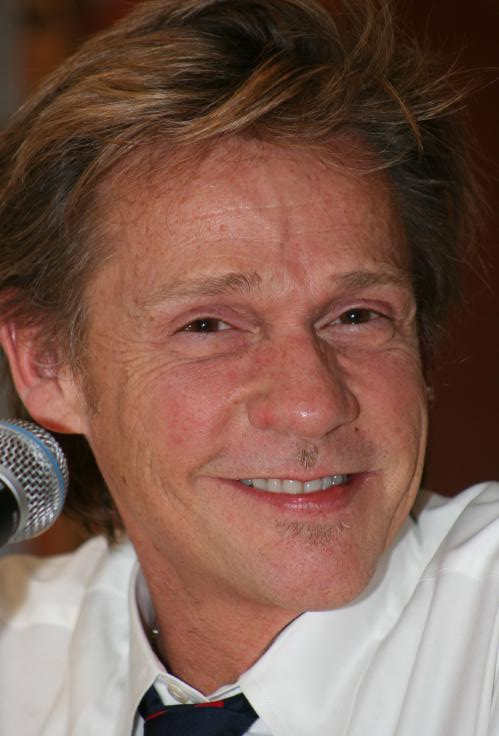
- Christopher in 2005
- Born: Dennis Christopher Carrelli; December 2, 1950 (age 75); Philadelphia, Pennsylvania, U.S.
- Occupation: Actor
- Years active: 1967–2016

Dennis Christopher Carrelli (born December 2, 1950) is an American retired actor, whose film credits include Breaking Away (1979), Fade to Black (1980), Chariots of Fire (1981), It (1990) and Django Unchained (2012).

== Early life ==
Dennis Christopher Carrelli, the youngest of four children, was born in Philadelphia on December 2, 1950, to Vincent Albert Carrelli, an insurance salesman, and the former Anna Marie Doogan. His parents married in 1936. He had two brothers, Vincent Carrelli Jr. (a talent manager who later went by the name Vince Cannon) and Edward Carrelli, along with one sister, Patricia Kratzinger Laros.

Christopher graduated from Monsignor Bonner High School in 1968. He attended Temple University, but dropped out in 1969.

== Career ==
In 1967, Christopher made a guest appearance on The Time Tunnel in the episode "Merlin the Magician" (S1E27). A chance encounter with Federico Fellini, who was filming in Rome at the time, led to the director casting him as a hippie in the film Roma (1972).

After that, Christopher worked as an assistant to the fashion designer Halston.

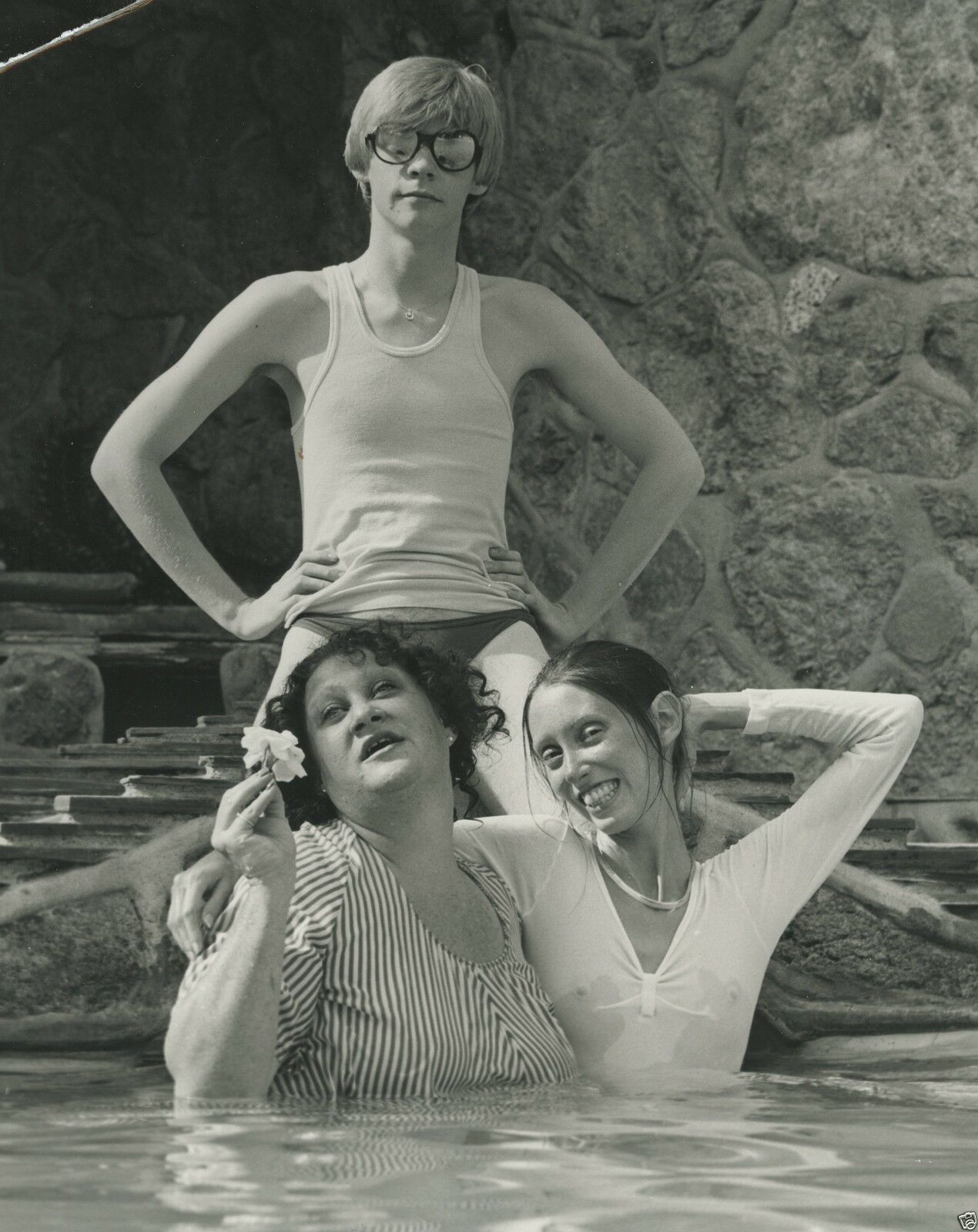
Christopher with Pat Ast (left) and Shelley Duvall (right), August 1975

Christopher's breakthrough role was as Dave Stohler in the coming-of-age classic Breaking Away (1979). His performance won him the BAFTA Award for Most Promising Newcomer and the Youth in Film Award for Best Juvenile Actor in a Motion Picture, as well as garnering a Golden Globe nomination.

Christopher's other roles include American track star Charlie Paddock in Chariots of Fire (1981), as well as tragic film-buff psychopath Eric Binford in Fade to Black, a turn which earned him a nomination for a Saturn Award for Best Actor (1980), Damon in The Falling (1985), Nathan Flowers in A Sinful Life (1989) and Leech in Plughead Rewired: Circuitry Man II (1994). Television roles include "Jack of All Trades" in the Profiler TV series, Eddie Kaspbrak in Stephen King's It (1990), Desmond Floyd in Jake Speed (1986) and Bellegarde in the HBO series Deadwood.

Christopher guest starred in two Star Trek episodes: the Star Trek: Deep Space Nine episode "The Search (Part II)" and the Star Trek: Enterprise episode "Detained". He guest-starred as the demon-sorcerer Cyvus Vail in three episodes of Angel.

He reunited with his Breaking Away "father" Paul Dooley, playing Dooley's son for a third time, in a 2003 episode of Law & Order: Criminal Intent. The two had first played father and son in Robert Altman's A Wedding (1978). In December 2006, he played Dr. Martin Ruber in the Sci Fi Channel miniseries The Lost Room.

Christopher was cast as Leonide Moguy in Quentin Tarantino's Django Unchained (2012). He learned through his agent that the screenplay had been re-written to accommodate him. Furthermore, Tarantino later told Christopher that he had seen every one of his films the week that they were released, even Dead Women in Lingerie (which Christopher considers his worst). Production of the film made a very positive impact on Christopher, who stated, "...a lot of my idea of happiness came from working on this film...".

== Filmography ==
=== Film ===
Year	Title	Role	Notes
1971	Blood and Lace	Pete	
1971	The Young Graduates	Pan	
1972	Roma	The Hippie	Uncredited
1977	3 Women	Soda Delivery Boy	Uncredited
1977	September 30, 1955	Eugene	
1978	A Wedding	Hughie Brenner	
1979	California Dreaming	T.T.	
1979	Breaking Away	Dave Stohler	BAFTA Award for Most Promising Newcomer to Leading Film Role; Nominated – Golden Globe Award for New Star of the Year — Actor
1979	The Last Word	Ben Travis	
1980	Fade to Black	Eric Binford	Taormina International Film Festival for Bronze Mask Award; Young Artist Award for Best Juvenile Actor in a Motion Picture; Nominated – Saturn Award for Best Actor
1981	Chariots of Fire	Charles Paddock	
1982	Don't Cry, It's Only Thunder	Brian Anderson	
1983	Didn't You Hear...	Kevin	
1986	Flight of the Spruce Goose	Stan	
1986	Jake Speed	Desmond Floyd	
1986	Alien Predator	Damon	Also known as The Falling
1988	Friends	John	
1989	A Sinful Life	Nathan Flowers	
1990	Circuitry Man	Leech	
1991	The Disco Years	Mr. Reese	Short film
1991	Dead Women in Lingerie	Lapin	
1993	Doppelganger	Doctor Heller	
1993	Necronomicon: Book of the Dead	Dale Porkel	Part 2
1994	Plughead Rewired: Circuitry Man II	Leech	
1995	Aurora: Operation Intercept	Victor Varenkov	
1995	Bad English I: Tales of a Song of a Brit	unknown role	
1996	It's My Party	Douglas Reedy	
1996	The Silencers	Comdor	
2001	Mind Rage	Steve	
2004	Nine Lives	Mikey	
2010	Queen of the Lot	Odin Johannessen	
2012	Django Unchained	Leonide Moguy	Nominated – Gold Derby Award for Ensemble Cast
2013	Prisoners	Mr. Jones	Uncredited
2013	The Slippery Slope	Pastor Tomaso	Short film
2021	Pennywise: The Story of It	Himself	Documentary film

=== Television ===
Year	Title	Role	Notes
1967	The Time Tunnel	Young Merlin	Uncredited; Episode: "Merlin the Magician"
1976	Bernice Bobs Her Hair	Charley	TV movie
1979	Elvis	Nick Adams	TV movie
1983	Faerie Tale Theatre	Jack	Episode: "Jack and the Beanstalk"
1984	Tales of the Unexpected	Driver	Episode: "Number Eight"
1984	Trapper John, M.D.	Daryl Kirby	Episode: "Promises...Promises"
1985	Moonlighting	Benjamin Wylie	Episode: "The Lady in the Iron Mask"
1986	Cagney & Lacey	Dr. Stanley	Episode: "A Safe Place"
1986	The Equalizer	Father Nicholas Kostmayer	Episode: "The Cup"
1987	Stingray	Joshua Williams	Episode: "The Second Finest Man Who Ever Lived"
1987	The Law & Harry McGraw	Jacob Hossler	Episode: "Murder by Landslide"
1987	Hooperman	Danny Welles	Episode: "Blues for Danny Welles"
1988	Christabel	U.S. Airmen	Miniseries; Episode: "#1.3"
1989	Matlock	Noel Bishop	Episode: "The Star"
1990	It	Eddie Kaspbrak	Miniseries
1990–93	Murder, She Wrote	Dr. Henry Carlson / Lyman Taggart	Episodes: "Shear Madness", "Final Curtain"
1991	Monsters	Laurence Bauer	Episode: "Hostile Takeover"
1991	False Arrest	Wally Roberts	TV movie
1992	Civil Wars	Jamie Berne	Episode: "Oceans White with Phone"
1992	Willing to Kill: The Texas Cheerleader Story	Randy	TV movie
1993	Curacao	Friedrich	Uncredited; TV movie
1994	Winnetka Road	Sam Franklin	Episode: "Women in Love"
1994	Star Trek: Deep Space Nine	Borath	Episode: "The Search: Part II"
1994	The Cosby Mysteries	Eric Humbold	Episode: "Mirror, Mirror"
1995	The Watcher	Sascha	Episode: "Heartburned"
1995	Deadly Invasion: The Killer Bee Nightmare	Pruitt Taylor Beachaump	TV movie
1996	SeaQuest 2032	Ambassador Dillington	Episode: "Reunion"
1996	The Sentinel	Dr. Anthony Bates	Episode: "Cypher"
1996	Pacific Blue	Dr. Mortimer T. Anton	Episode: "The Phoenix"
1996	Tarzan: The Epic Adventures	Philip D'Arnot	Episode: "Tarzan's Return: Part I"
1996	The Burning Zone	Dr. Balfour	Episode: "Lethal Injection"
1996–99	Profiler	Jack of All Trades / Albert Newquay / Sheriff Ed Post	47 episodes (Main role; seasons 1 & 2, Recurring; season 3, Guest; season 4)
1997	Skeletons	Jim Norton	TV movie
1998	New York Undercover	Dr. Royce	Episode: "Spare Parts"
2000–01	FreakyLinks	Vince Elsing	Series regular (13 episodes)
2001	The Ballad of Lucy Whipple	Joshua 'Carrots' Beale	TV movie
2001	Roswell	Bobby Dupree	Episodes: "Disturbing Behavior", "How the Other Half Lives"
2001	Kate Brasher	Jesus	Episodes: "Jeff", "Georgia"
2001	18 Wheels of Justice	Vin Malfi	Episode: "The Game"
2002	Star Trek: Enterprise	Danik	Episode: "Detained"
2002	Crossing Jordan	Charles Rutledge	Episode: "One Twelve"
2003	Six Feet Under	Kevin Lamb	Episode: "Nobody Sleeps"
2003	Law & Order: Criminal Intent	Roger Coffman	Episode: "Cherry Red"
2004	Angel	Cyvus Vail	Episodes: "Origin", "Power Play", "Not Fade Away"
2004	NYPD Blue	Gerard Prosser	Episode: "The Vision Thing"
2006	Deadwood	Bellegarde	Recurring role (5 episodes)
2006	The Lost Room	Dr. Martin Ruber	Miniseries; 3 episodes
2006	Trapped!	Adrien	TV movie
2007	CSI: Crime Scene Investigation	Richard Dorsey / Homeless Guy	Episodes: "Cockroaches", "Lying Down with Dogs"
2008	Criminal Minds	Abner Merriman	Episode: "Damaged"
2013	Unforgettable	Lukas Emminger	Episode: "Line Up or Shut Up"
2014	Perception	Fred Gorman	Episode: "Cobra"
2016	Graves	Martin Treadwell	Recurring role (4 episodes)

=== Theatre ===
Year	Title	Role	Venue	Notes
1981	The Little Foxes	Leo Hubbard	Martin Beck Theatre	126 performances
1983	Brothers	Tommy	Music Box Theatre	One performance
