= Nicholas Worth =

American actor (1937–2007)

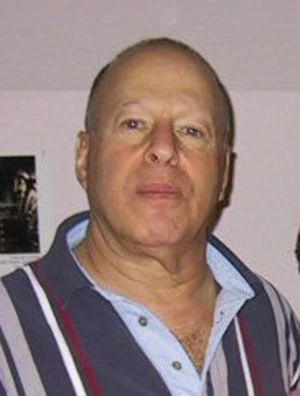
- Born: September 4, 1937; St. Louis, Missouri, U.S.
- Died: May 7, 2007 (aged 69); Van Nuys, California, U.S.
- Education: Carnegie Institute of Technology
- Occupation: Actor
- Years active: 1966–2005

Nicholas Worth (September 4, 1937 – May 7, 2007) was an American character actor who appeared on film, on TV, and in video games.

== Early years ==
Worth was born in St. Louis, Missouri on September 4, 1937. He served for three years in the army as a paratrooper and studied at the Carnegie Institute of Technology and Pasadena Playhouse.

== Career ==
Worth specialized in playing antagonistic characters. Among his best-known, most typical villainous roles are Kirk Smith, the tormented necrophiliac serial-killer of attractive young women in the low-budget horror film Don't Answer the Phone! (1980), and Ray, a fearsome homosexual rapist in the 1985 television film The Rape of Richard Beck.

He began with a low-level TV career, appearing in one episode of Charlie's Angels as a kidnapper-on-skates. Subsequently, he played numerous roles as henchmen and tough guys in films such as Swamp Thing (1982), City Heat (1984), Doin' Time (1985), The Ladies Club (1986), No Way Out (1987), Hell Comes to Frogtown (1988), Action Jackson (1988), The Naked Gun: From the Files of Police Squad! (1988), Darkman (1990), Best of the Best II (1993), Plughead Rewired: Circuitry Man II (1994), Barb Wire (1996) and Blood Dolls (1999). He appeared at the beginning of Heartbreak Ridge (1986) as a convict who was beaten up by Clint Eastwood, and in the same year, he played a Divine-like drag queen who loses his clothes to John Candy in Armed and Dangerous. He continued his television career, playing small roles in sci-fi programs like Star Trek: Voyager and Star Trek: Deep Space Nine, and in WKRP in Cincinnati, Knight Rider, Hunter, Night Court and Simon & Simon.

He also did video game work, portraying General Marzaq and Soviet leader Alexander Romanov in Westwood Studios' Command & Conquer series of games, Sierra's The Beast Within: A Gabriel Knight Mystery (1995), and Emperor: Battle for Dune (2001). He also provided the voice of Mr. Jones/Colonel Bulba in Freedom Fighters (2003).

== Personal life ==
Worth was an amateur power-lifter and bodybuilder and a born-again Christian.

== Death ==
Worth died of heart failure at Valley Presbyterian Hospital in Van Nuys, California at the age of 69.

== Selected filmography ==
- 1966 For Pete's Sake
- 1973 Scream Blacula Scream as Dennis
- 1974 Bogard as Masters
- 1974 The Terminal Man as Hospital Orderly (uncredited)
- 1974 Black Starlet as Motorcycle Cop
- 1977 Mule Feathers as "Copperhead"
- 1978 Coma as Jefferson Institute Chief of Security (uncredited)
- 1979 The Glove as Chuck
- 1980 Don't Answer the Phone! as Kirk Smith
- 1982 Swamp Thing as Bruno
- 1984 Invitation to Hell as Sheriff
- 1984 The Hills Have Eyes Part II as The Reaper (voice, uncredited)
- 1984 City Heat as Troy Roker
- 1985 Doin' Time as "Animal"
- 1985 The Rape of Richard Beck as Ray
- 1986 The Ladies Club as Jack Dwyer
- 1986 Armed and Dangerous as Transvestite
- 1986 Heartbreak Ridge as Jail Binger
- 1987 No Way Out as Cup Breaker
- 1987 Dirty Laundry as Vito
- 1987 Death Feud as Jim
- 1988 Hell Comes to Frogtown as "Bull"
- 1988 Action Jackson as Cartier
- 1988 The Naked Gun: From the Files of Police Squad! as Thug #1
- 1989 Pucker Up and Bark Like a Dog as The Head Chef
- 1990 Darkman as Pauly Mazzuchelli
- 1991 Blood and Concrete as Spuntz
- 1993 Best of the Best II as "Sick Humor"
- 1993 Fist of Honor as Tucchi
- 1994 Plughead Rewired: Circuitry Man II as "Rock"
- 1994 Dark Angel: The Ascent as "Father / Hellikin"
- 1995 A Gift from Heaven
- 1995 Hologram Man as "One-Eye"
- 1996 Barb Wire as Ruben Tannenbaum
- 1996 High School High as "Rhino"
- 1996 Timelock as Sullivan
- 1996 Dangerous Cargo as Yuri
- 1997 Leather Jacket Love Story as Jack
- 1998 Denial as Walt Smiley
- 1999 Slaves of Hollywood as Sam Gittleman
- 1999 Blood Dolls as George Warbeck
- 1999 Every Dog Has Its Day as Mel
- 2000 Starforce as Jemma Quonloy
