= Double, Double, Toil and Trouble =

- DVD cover
- Genre: Adventure; Comedy; Family; Fantasy; Horror
- Written by: Jurgen Wolff
- Directed by: Stuart Margolin
- Starring: Mary-Kate Olsen; Ashley Olsen; Cloris Leachman; Meshach Taylor
- Music by: Richard Bellis
- Country of origin: United States
- Original language: English

Production
- Executive producers: Allen S. Epstein; Jim Green
- Producers: Mark Bacino; Adria Later
- Production location: Vancouver
- Cinematography: Richard Leiterman
- Editor: George Appleby
- Running time: 96 min.
- Production companies: Dualstar Productions; Green/Epstein Productions; Warner Bros. Television

Original release
- Network: ABC
- Release: October 30, 1993

Double, Double, Toil and Trouble is a 1993 American Halloween made-for-television children's film. It stars Mary-Kate and Ashley Olsen, Cloris Leachman, and Meshach Taylor. The film premiered on ABC on October 30, 1993. It received a Primetime Emmy Award nomination, and the Olsen twins won a Youth in Film award for their performance.

The film's title is part of the famous line spoken by the three witches in Shakespeare's Macbeth (Act IV, Scene I): "Double, double toil and trouble; Fire burn and cauldron bubble".

== Plot ==
Don and Christine Farmer are deeply in debt and in danger of losing their home. They visit Christine's cold and cruel Aunt Agatha to ask for a loan, which is immediately refused. While seven-year-old twins Kelly and Lynn Farmer wait outside, they learn the history of their Aunt Agatha and her twin sister Sophia, who is trapped in a mirror, from Mr. Gravedigger. Unless she is rescued by midnight on Halloween, she will be stuck in the mirror forever. To prevent this, Kelly and Lynn must obtain the moonstone that Aunt Agatha wears around her neck at all times.

The girls devise a plan to free Sophia, which begins with sneaking away from their parents while Trick-or-Treating. On their way to the witches' meeting to try to get the moonstone from Agatha, they meet Mr. N and Oscar, who help them by getting Agatha to hand over the stone with a promise of doubling her power. Once in possession of the moonstone, the group splits: Lynn with Oscar, and Kelly with Mr. N. Lynn has the moonstone.

Agatha pursues Kelly and Mr. N., telling Kelly she is Sophia and was freed. Kelly realizes the deception, and Agatha turns Mr. N. into a crow. Mr. N. goes to tell Oscar and Lynn what is happening after Kelly escapes Agatha. Once he leaves, Kelly is caught by Agatha's butler, George, who is also Sophia's fiancé.

Lynn goes to Mr. Gravedigger to get his help in getting inside Agatha's house. Once inside, Lynn finds the mirror with Sophia in it minutes before Agatha and George return with Kelly. After a brief standoff where Lynn surrenders the moonstone to free Kelly and Agatha immediately threatens to renege on the deal, Mr. N. (who is still a crow) snatches the moonstone up and the twins use it and the power of love to free Sophia. Agatha attempts to trap Sophia, but falls into the mirror which shatters afterward, trapping her instead.

Don and Christine arrive, having involved the police in an attempt to locate the twins. Sophia and George decide to get married and live in Agatha's house. Sophia also gives Don and Christine enough money to save their own home. The film ends with the twins cleaning up the shattered mirror and denying Agatha's request for help leaving her own trap.

== Cast ==
- Ashley Olsen as Lynn Farmer / Young Agatha
- Mary-Kate Olsen as Kelly Farmer / Young Sophia
- Cloris Leachman as Aunt Agatha / Aunt Sophia
- Phil Fondacaro as Oscar
- Eric McCormack as Don Farmer
- Kelli Fox as Christine Farmer
- Wayne Robson as Mr. Gravedigger
- Matthew Walker as George
- Meshach Taylor as Mr. N
- Denalda Williams as hostess
- Gary Jones as Bernard Brewster
- Babz Chula as Madame Lulu
- Bill Meilen as chairperson
- Nora McLellan as female cop
- Alex Green as pumpkin driver
- Alek Diakun as doorman
- Claire Kaplan, Karin Konoval, Glynis Leyshon as witches
- Mitch Kosterman as cop
- Gary McAteer as Fred
- Eliza Centenera as girl
- Christopher Anderson as boy
- Lynda Boyd as singer
- Ian Bagg as fat man
- Freda Perry as girl's mother

== Production ==
Double, Double, Toil and Trouble was filmed in Vancouver, British Columbia, Canada, with the production completed in mid-July 1993. It was included in an agreement signed with ABC that also guaranteed the Olsen twins a series following Full House.

== Release ==
The film debuted in the United States on October 30, 1993. It was released on home video cassette in September 1995, and on DVD in 2004.

== Reception ==
=== Critical reception ===
In a brief review in USA Today, Matt Roush called it "infantile". Faye Zuckerman, in a column printed in The Tuscaloosa News, commented that the plot might be slightly too frightening for its target audience, yet lacked the substance to entertain anyone older. A brief review printed in the Observer–Reporter gave it a rating of one and a half stars, commenting that only fans of the Full House series could enjoy the film. In a syndicated column printed in the Ocala StarBanner, however, John Burlingame stated that kids would enjoy the film, and particularly commented positively on the costumes and Leachman's performance.

In a retrospective review, Barbara Shulgasser-Parker of Common Sense Media rated the film two out of five stars and noted that the film is "formulaic" and relies on the twins' brand. Shulgasser-Parker praised Leachman's performance.

=== Accolades ===
In 1994, composer Richard Bellis received an Emmy nomination for Outstanding Music Composition for a Limited or Anthology Series, Movie or Special (Original Dramatic Score). Mary-Kate and Ashley Olsen won the Youth in Film for Best Youth Actress in a TV Mini-Series, Movie of the Week, or Special at the 15th Youth in Film Awards in 1994.

== See also ==
- List of films about witchcraft
- List of films set around Halloween
