= Mark Rolston =

American actor

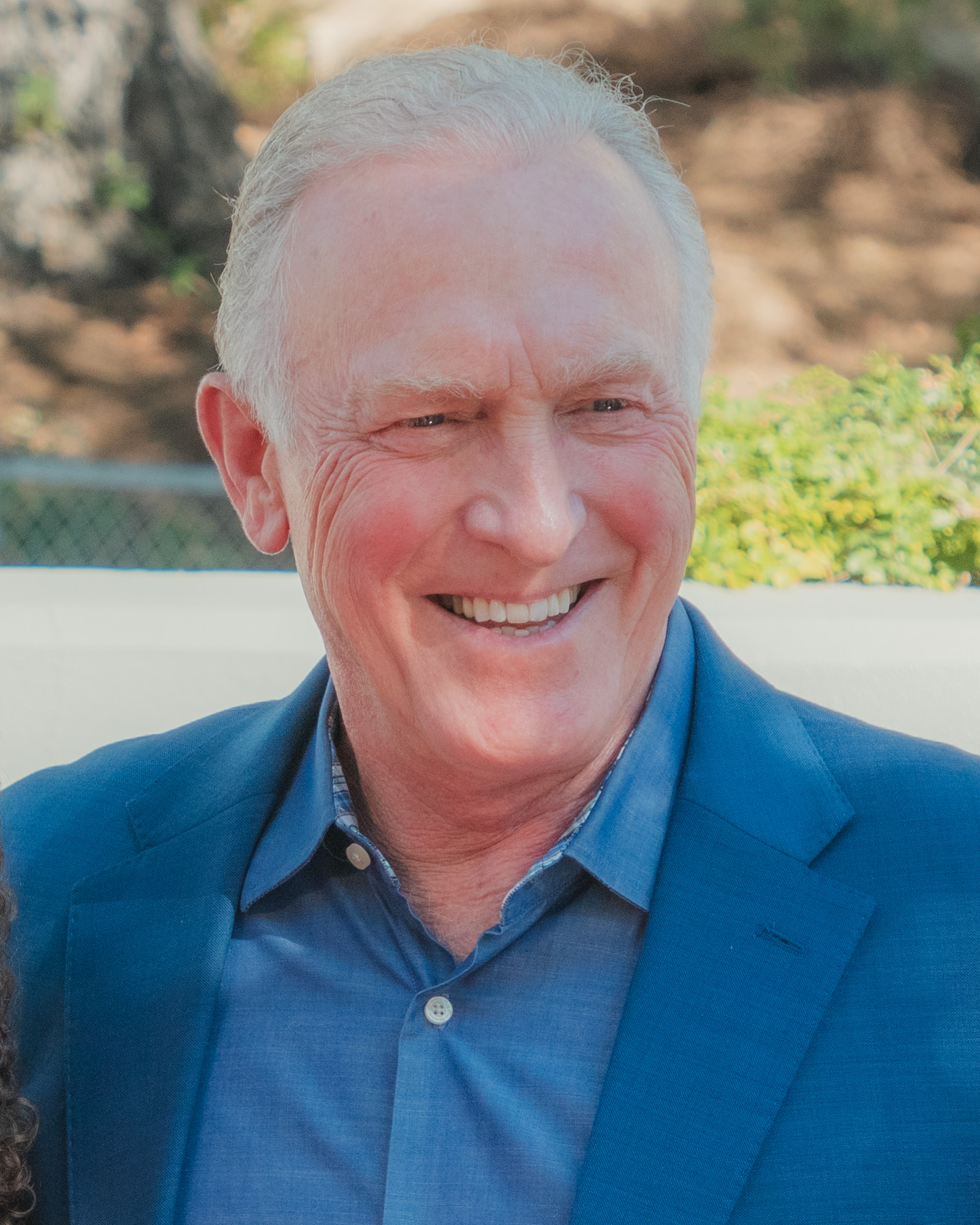
- Rolston in 2026
- Born: December 7, 1956 (age 69); Baltimore, Maryland, U.S.
- Education: Richmond American University London; Drama Centre London
- Occupation: Actor
- Years active: 1976–present

Mark Rolston (born December 7, 1956) is an American actor. He made his film debut as PFC. Drake in Aliens (1986), and is known for his supporting roles in films like Lethal Weapon 2 (1989), The Shawshank Redemption (1994), Rush Hour (1998), The Departed (2006), and the Saw film series (2008–2009). On television, he played Gordie Liman on The Shield (2003), Edward Shippen IV on Turn: Washington's Spies (2015–2016), the voice of Lex Luthor on Young Justice (2010–2022), and Lt. Don Thorne on Bosch (2018–2021) and Bosch: Legacy (2022–2025).

== Early life and education ==
Rolston was born in Baltimore, Maryland in 1956, raised by a single father. He began studying acting and ballet as a child at the Washington Theatre Club in Washington, D.C. He graduated from Bethesda-Chevy Chase High School in Bethesda, where he was classmates with actor Daniel Stern. He studied acting at the Richmond American University London and Drama Centre London in England. Anton Rodgers was a mentor.

== Career ==
Rolston's early career was in the theatre in the United Kingdom. He made his stage debut at the age of 19, in the West End play Are Now Or Have You Ever Been in 1976, about the House Un-American Activities Committee. He then starred in Miss Julie at the Edinburgh International Festival, Sam Shepard's Action at the London Festival Fringe, and Bus Stop at The Mill at Sonning. He played the title role in a US national touring production of Richard II for the National Shakespeare Company.

In 1984, he was cast in a minor role in the Al Pacino film Revolution. His role was cut from the final film, but he leveraged it into his audition for Aliens, and was cast as PFC Drake, his film debut.

Rolston played Hans in Lethal Weapon 2 (1989), Herb in Prancer (1989), Stef in RoboCop 2 (1990), Bogs Diamond in The Shawshank Redemption (1994), J. Scar in Eraser (1996), Chief Dennis Wilson in Daylight (1996), Wayne Bryce in Hard Rain (1998), and Special Agent Warren Russ in Rush Hour (1998).

Rolston acted in Martin Scorsese's Academy Award winning 2006 film The Departed and the television horror film Backwoods. Many of Rolston's screen roles are villains due to his well-known icy stare. He also co-starred in 2008's Saw V and 2009's Saw VI. In 1994, he portrayed convicted killer "Karl Mueller" in the Babylon 5 episode "The Quality of Mercy", as well as "Richard Odin", leader of a vegetarian cult in an episode of The X-Files titled "Red Museum". In 2004, Rolston would guest star in two episodes of the critically acclaimed 24. He appeared in a minor role in The CW series Supernatural during the fourth season as the demon Alastair. He also appeared as Sheriff Hall in the Criminal Minds episode, "Blood Hungry".

Rolston has also voiced several Marvel and DC characters, voicing Firefly in The New Batman Adventures and Justice League (he was originally considered to voice the supervillain in Batman: The Animated Series in 1992, although the character was deemed unsuitable for the series and ultimately dropped). He voiced Lex Luthor in the animated series Young Justice, Deathstroke in Batman: Arkham Origins and Batman: Arkham Knight, as well as Norman Osborn in the Spider-Man Insomniac Games.

== Personal life ==
Rolston was born in Baltimore, Maryland, the son of Evelyn Beverly (née Sturm) and Thomas George Rolston, who was a computer programmer. He has been married twice, first to Sally Hughes, between 1981 and 1987. Then to Georgina O’Farrill, starting in 1994. He has five children between both marriages.

== Filmography ==
=== Film ===
Year	Title	Role	Notes
1985	Revolution		Deleted role
1986	Aliens	Private Mark Drake	
1987	The Fourth Protocol	Russian Decoder	
1987	Weeds	Dave	
1989	A Sinful Life	Teresa	
1989	Survival Quest	Jake	
1989	Lethal Weapon 2	Hans	
1989	Prancer	Herb Drier	
1990	Impulse	Man in Bar	
1990	RoboCop 2	Stef	
1993	Body of Evidence	Detective Reese	
1994	Scanner Cop	Lieutenant Harry Brown	
1994	The Shawshank Redemption	Bogs Diamond	
1995	Best of the Best 3: No Turning Back	Donnie Hansen	
1995	The Set-Up	Ray Harris	
1996	Eraser	J. Scar	
1996	Daylight	Chief Dennis Wilson	
1998	I Woke Up Early the Day I Died	Hot Dog Vendor	
1998	Hard Rain	Wayne Bryce	
1998	Letters from a Killer	O'Dell	
1998	Rush Hour	Agent Warren Russ	
1999	A Table for One	Tom Bernard	
2002	Cathedral	Robert	
2002	Scorcher	Special Agent Kellaway	
2002	Highway	Burt Miranda	
2005	Chasing Ghosts	Frank Anderson	
2005	Miracle at Sage Creek	Captain Johnson	
2006	The Departed	Timothy Delahunt	
2007	Protecting the King	Frank	
2008	Asylum	The Doctor	
2008	Saw V	FBI Special Agent Dan Erickson	
2009	Not Forgotten	Agent Wilson	
2009	Saw VI	FBI Special Agent Dan Erickson	
2012	That Guy...Who Was In That Thing	Himself	Documentary
2016	Tell Me How I Die	Dr. Layton	
2017	Gangster Land	Dean O'Banion	
2019	Midway	Admiral Ernest J. King	
2022	In Search of Tomorrow	Himself	Documentary

=== Television ===
Year	Title	Role	Notes
1982	X-Bomber	John Lee	Voice, UK dub
1984	The First Olympics: Athens 1896	Princeton Student	Miniseries
1985	American Playhouse	Bodine	Episode: "Displaced Person"
1986	Sledge Hammer!	Officer Braddock	Episode: "Magnum Farce"
1987	Wiseguy	Renaldo Sykes	Episode: "Pilot"
1987	Tour of Duty	PV2 Innes	Episode: "Burn Baby, Burn"
1989	Matlock	Keith Morrisey	Episode: "The Blues Singer"
1990	The Young Riders	Richard	Episode: "Hard Time"
1990	Tales from the Crypt	Dr. Zachary Cling	Episode: "Lower Berth"
1990	Father Dowling Mysteries	Mark	Episode: "The Undercover Nun Mystery"
1990	Jake and the Fatman	Jerry Malik	Episode: "Night and Day"
1991	In the Heat of the Night	Kevin Reilly	Episode: "Baby for Sale"
1992–1995	Murder, She Wrote	Sgt. Terence Boyle, Finn Dawley, Liam Gillen	4 episodes
1993	Raven	Peter Lyons	Episode: "Poisoned Harvest"
1994	Star Trek: The Next Generation	Lt. Walter Pierce	Episode: "Eye of the Beholder"
1994	Babylon 5	Karl Mueller	Episode: "The Quality of Mercy"
1994	Diagnosis: Murder	Vinnie Bartell	Episode: "You Can Call Me Johnson"
1994, 2000	The X-Files	Richard Odin, Bud LaPierre	2 episodes
1995	ER	Officer Thomas	Episode: "The Birthday Party"
1995	Lois & Clark: The New Adventures of Superman	Gregor	Episode: "Lucky Leon"
1995	Courthouse	Philip Carter	Episode: "Mitigating Circumstances"
1995	Strange Luck	Bagman, Merch	Episode: "Blind Man's Bluff"
1996	Sisters	Col. Hastings	Episode: "Leap Before You Look"
1996	Profit	Ivan Karpov	Episode: "Sykes"
1996	JAG	Lieutenant Commander Mark Lowery	Episode: "Recovery"
1996	The Lazarus Man	The Rescue	Episode: "The Rescue"
1996	Moloney	Joe Ballantine	Episode: "Pilot"
1996	Walker, Texas Ranger	Jake Prentice	Episode: "A Silent Cry"
1997	The Legend of Calamity Jane	Bill Doolin	Voice, 13 episodes
1997–1998	Brooklyn South	Detective Lou Conroy	3 episodes
1997–1998	Zorro	Additional Voices	26 episodes
1998	Nash Bridges	Louis Jackson	Episode: "Crossfire"
1998	Men in Black: The Series	Additional Voices	Episode: "The Elle of My Dreams Syndrome"
1998	From the Earth to the Moon	Gus Grissom	Miniseries
1998	The Crow: Stairway to Heaven	MaseReyes	Episode: "Souled Out"
1998	The New Batman Adventures	Garfield Lynns / Firefly	Voice, 2 episodes
1998–1999	Profiler	Donald Lucas	7 episodes
1999	Harsh Realm	Bounty Hunter	Episode: "Leviathan"
1999	Aftershock: Earthquake in New York	Bruce Summerlin	Miniseries
1999	Godzilla: The Series	Captain Moore	Voice, episode: "End of the Line"
2000	Batman Beyond	Carl	Voice, episode: "The Eggbaby"
2001	Angel	Boone	Episode: "Blood Money"
2001	Max Steel	Additional Voices	2 episodes
2001	Dark Angel	Herman Colberg	Episode: "Haven"
2001	Dead Last	Sheriff Wayne	Episode: "Teen Spirit"
2001	Alias	Seth Lambert	Episode: "Parity"
2001	Touched by an Angel	Delroy Gibbons	Episode: "Famous Last Words"
2001	NYPD Blue	Leon Broadus, Carl Bowen	2 episodes
2002	For the People	Mr. Cassidy	Episode: "Come Blow Your Whistle"
2002	Curb Your Enthusiasm	Contractor	Episode: "The Corpse-Sniffing Dog"
2003	The Shield	Gordie Liman	5 episodes
2003	The Dead Zone	Hysterical Parishioner #3	Episode: "Zion"
2003	Justice League	Garfield Lynns / Firefly	Voice, episode: "Only a Dream" Pt. 1
2003–2004	Star Trek: Enterprise	Kuroda Lor-ehn, Captain Magh	2 episodes
2004	24	Bruce Foxton	2 episodes
2005	CSI: NY	Inspector Bill Markoni	Episode: "The Dove Commission"
2005	Criminal Minds	Sheriff Hall	Episode: "Blood Hungry"
2006–2007	CSI: Miami	FBI Agent Glen Cole	3 episodes
2007	Shark	Cade Berlinger	Episode: "The Wrath of Khan"
2007	Reaper	Arthur Ferrey	Episode: "Charged"
2007	Cold Case	Ari Gordon	4 episodes
2007–2009	The Closer	Father Jack	2 episodes
2008	Supernatural	Alastair	2 episodes
2008	The Mentalist	Det. Dale Blakely	Episode: "The Thin Red Line"
2009	CSI: Crime Scene Investigation	Sheriff	Episode: "One to Go"
2009	NCIS: Los Angeles	Marine Sergeant Jerrold "Pallet" Mulhearn	Episode: "Keepin' It Real"
2009	Lie to Me	Ed Kominsky	Episode: "Secret Santa"
2010–2011	The Defenders	Johnny Greene	2 episodes
2010–2013, 2019	Young Justice	Lex Luthor, Jonathan Kent, Highfather, Hro Talak, Antinoos, Sumaan Harjavti	Voice, 9 episodes
2012	Body of Proof	Detective Charlie Meeks	Episode: "Shades of Blue"
2012	Breakout Kings	Chief Inspector Craig Renner	Episode: "An Unjust Death"
2012	Touch	Ed	Episode: "Tessellations"
2012	Franklin & Bash	Hon. Clarence Rydberg	Episode: "Last Dance"
2012	NCIS	George Westcott	2 episodes
2015	Castle	Kurt Van Zant	Episode: "Dead from New York"
2015–2016	Turn: Washington's Spies	Judge Edward Shippen	7 episodes
2016	Scorpion	Agent Cooke	2 episodes
2016	Rosewood	Harvey	Episode: "Badges & Bombshells"
2016	Roots	Jewett	Miniseries
2017	Rebel	IA Investigator #1	Episode: "Pilot"
2017	Voltron: Legendary Defender	Kolivan, General Herreh	Voice, 8 episodes
2017	Snowfall	Max	1 episode
2018	SEAL Team	David Alper	Episode: "Credible Threat"
2018–2021	Bosch	Lt. Thorne	9 episodes
2022	Star Wars: Tales of the Jedi	Senator Dagonet	Voice, episode: "Justice"
2023	Ahsoka	Captain Hayle	Episode: "Part One: Master and Apprentice"

=== Video games ===
Year	Title	Role	Notes
1997	Blade Runner	Clovis	
2000	Nox	Warlord Horrendous, others	
2008	Turok	Captain Cole	
2009	Dragon Age: Origins	Lord Darvianak Vollney, others	
2012	Halo 4	Captain Andrew Del Rio	
2013	Aliens: Colonial Marines	Private Mark Drake	
2013	Injustice: Gods Among Us	Lex Luthor	
2013	Batman: Arkham Origins	Deathstroke	
2013	Young Justice: Legacy	Lex Luthor, Blockbuster	
2014	Skylanders: Trap Team	Additional Voices	
2015	Infinite Crisis	Starro	
2015	Battlefield Hardline	Neil Roark	Also motion capture
2015	Batman: Arkham Knight	Deathstroke	
2016	Fallout 4: Nuka-World	Porter Gage	
2016	Let It Die	Jackal Y	
2018	Spider-Man	Norman Osborn	
2018	Lego DC Super-Villains	Deathstroke	
2020	Spider-Man: Miles Morales	Norman Osborn	
2023	Spider-Man 2	Norman Osborn	
2023	Star Trek: Resurgence	Portal 63	
2024	Batman: Arkham Shadow	Jim Gordon	
