= Anita Morris =

American actress, singer, and dancer (1943–1994)

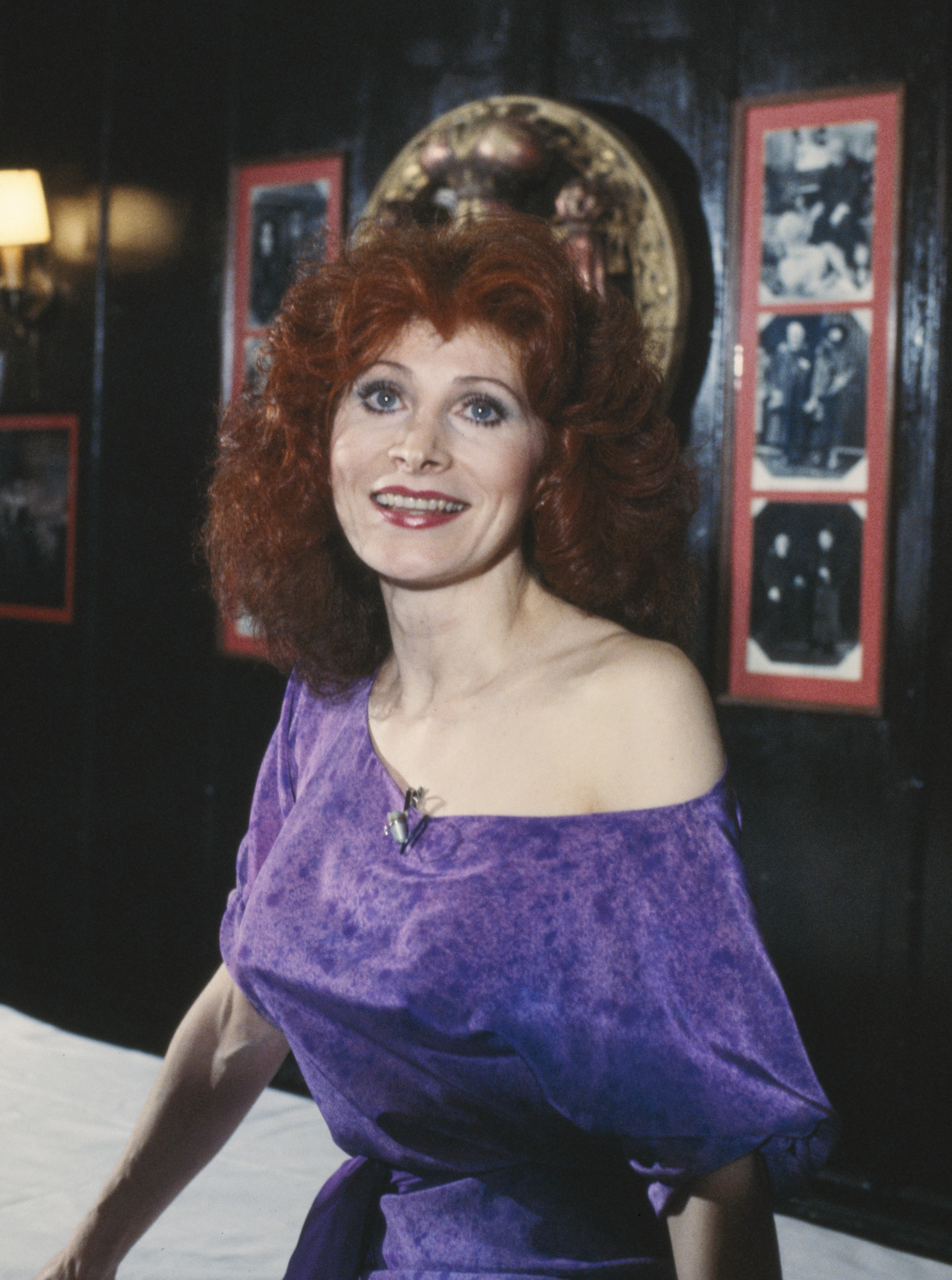
- Morris in 1982
- Born: Anita Rose Morris; March 14, 1943; Durham, North Carolina, US
- Died: March 2, 1994 (aged 50); Los Angeles, California, US
- Resting place: Maplewood Cemetery
- Occupations: Actress, singer, dancer
- Years active: 1971–1994
- Spouse: Grover Dale (m. 1973)
- Children: James Badge Dale

Anita Rose Morris (March 14, 1943 – March 2, 1994) was an American actress, singer and dancer. She began her career performing in Broadway musicals, including Jesus Christ Superstar, Seesaw and Nine, for which she received a Tony Award nomination.

During her career, Morris had starring roles in a number of films, include The Hotel New Hampshire (1984), Absolute Beginners (1986), Ruthless People (1986), Aria (1987), 18 Again! (1988), Bloodhounds of Broadway (1989) and A Sinful Life (1989). She had leading roles in two short-lived television series in 1980s: the NBC prime time soap opera Berrenger's (1985), and the Fox sitcom Down and Out in Beverly Hills (1987).

== Career ==
Morris' most prominent film role was as Carol Dodsworth, the mistress to Danny DeVito, in Ruthless People; her most prominent stage role was her sensual performance as Carla in the musical Nine opposite Raul Julia. While nominated for a Best Featured Actress Tony Award as Carla, she lost to Liliane Montevecchi, also in Nine. 21 years later, Jane Krakowski won the Tony Award in the same category as Morris, playing Carla in a revival with Antonio Banderas. Her signature number in Nine was "A Call from the Vatican", and she also sang "Simple", late in act two. She was scheduled to perform the former at the Tony Awards in 1982, but the television censors found her outfit too revealing. Her stage work began in the American Mime Theatre, and carried her to Broadway both for Nine, Jesus Christ Superstar, Seesaw, The Magic Show (cast album and video/DVD), Sugar Babies (replacement for the "Soubrette" originated by Ann Jillian) and The Best Little Whorehouse in Texas.

Morris portrayed Rob Lowe's lover Rhonda Ray in The Hotel New Hampshire (1984). Other film work included The Happy Hooker (1975), Maria's Lovers (1984), Absolute Beginners (1986) with David Bowie, Blue City (1986) with Judd Nelson, Ruthless People (1986) with Danny DeVito and Bette Midler, 18 Again! (1988) with George Burns, Bloodhounds of Broadway (1989) with Madonna and Matt Dillon, A Sinful Life (1989), Martians Go Home (1989) with Randy Quaid, Off and Running (1991) with Cyndi Lauper, Little Miss Millions (1993) with Jennifer Love Hewitt, Me and the Kid (1993), and Radioland Murders (1994), which was her final film role.

During the 1980s and early 1990s, she played guest roles in sitcoms and dramas, including Miami Vice, Who's the Boss?, Murder, She Wrote, Cheers, Melrose Place, Matlock, Tales from the Crypt, Murphy Brown and A Different World. In 1984, Morris was featured in The Rolling Stones' music video "She Was Hot".

== Early life ==
Morris was born in Durham, North Carolina, one of three children born to Eloise (née Chappell), who was involved in theatrical production, and Dr. James Badgett Morris, a physician.

== Personal life and death ==
Anita Morris married Grover Dale in 1973 and had a son, actor James Badge Dale.

She developed ovarian cancer in 1980, and was given only five years to live, but went on to live another 14 years before her death on March 2, 1994. She was survived by her husband, her son, her parents, her siblings (Dr. Jon Byron Morris and Dr. James Douglas Morris), and her sisters-in-law, nieces and nephews. She was buried in Maplewood Cemetery in her native Durham, North Carolina.

== Filmography ==
Year	Title	Role	Notes
1972	The Broad Coalition	Sheila Saunders	Feature film
1975	The Happy Hooker	May Smith	Feature film
1980	Big Blonde	Bootsie	Television film
1981	So Fine	So Fine Dancer	Feature film
1983	The Magic Show	Charmin	Feature film
1984	The Hotel New Hampshire	Ronda Ray	Feature film
1984	Maria's Lovers	Mrs. Wynic	Feature film
1985	Berrenger's	Babs Berrenger	Television series • Season 1 (all 12 episodes)
1986	A Masterpiece of Murder	Lola Crane	Television film
1986	Absolute Beginners	Dido Lament	Feature film
1986	Blue City	Malvina Kerch-Turner	Feature film
1986	Ruthless People	Carol	Feature film
1986	A Smoky Mountain Christmas	Jezebel	Television film
1987	Down and Out in Beverly Hills	Barbara Whiteman	Television series • Season 1 (all 13 episodes)
1987	Cheers	Madeline Keith	Television series • Season 5, Episode 19: "Dog Bites Cliff"
1987	Aria	Phoebe	Feature film (segment: "Rigoletto")
1987	Miami Vice	Leona Proverb	Television series • Season 4, Episode 2: "Amen... Send Money"
1988	18 Again!	Madeline	Feature film
1989	Murder, She Wrote	Leona Schubert	Television series • Season 5, Episode 11: "The Search for Peter Kerry"
1989	Who's the Boss?	Betty	Television series • Season 5, Episode 13: "Cardinal Sin"
1989	Bloodhounds of Broadway	Miss Missouri Martin	Feature film
1989	A Sinful Life	Claire Vin Blance	Feature film
1989	Martians Go Home	Dr. Jane Buchanan	Feature film
1989	Matlock	Catherine McKay	Television series • Season 4, Episode 7: "The Star"
1990	Good Grief	Zumaya	Television series • Season 1, Episode 5: "Mooses, Masons and the Secret Life of Trees"
1990	WIOU	Frances Frazier	Television series • Season 1, Episode 5: "One Point, No Light"
1991	Tales from the Crypt	Fuchsia Monroe	Television series • Season 3, Episode 13: "Spoiled"
1991	Off and Running	Florence	Feature film
1991	Pros and Cons	Marge	Television series • Season 1, Episode 7: "Murder Most Perfect"
1992	Eerie, Indiana	Eunice Danforth / Marshall Teller	Television series • Season 1, Episode 15: "No Brain, No Pain"
1992	Melrose Place	Stella Rivers	Television series • Season 1, Episode 10: "Burned"
1992	Matlock	Elaine Genrich	Television series • Season 7, Episodes 3 & 4: "The Legacy" (2 parts)
1992	A Different World	Joni Brooks	Television series • Season 6, Episode 13: "White Christmas"
1993	Trade Winds	Contessa Laetitia Philips Gabetti	Miniseries (all 3 episodes)
1993	Major Dad	Connie	Television series • Season 4, Episode 16: "Colonel and Truth"
1993	Little Miss Millions	Sybil Lofton	Feature film
1993	Me and the Kid	Mrs. Feldman	Feature film
1994	Radioland Murders	Claudette Katsenback	Feature film (posthumous release), (final film role)
