= Little Miss Millions =

1993 American film

- Directed by: Jim Wynorski
- Written by: R.J. Robertson; Jim Wynorski
- Produced by: Mike Elliott
- Starring: Jennifer Love Hewitt; Howard Hesseman; Anita Morris; James Avery; Pat Brady; Rick Dean; Antonia Dorian; Robert Fieldsteel
- Music by: Joel Goldsmith
- Production companies: Concorde-New Horizons; The Pacific Trust
- Distributed by: Concorde Pictures; New Horizons Home Video
- Release date: 1993
- Running time: 90 minutes
- Country: United States
- Language: English

Little Miss Millions (re-released in 1994 as Home for Christmas) is a 1993 American comedy film directed by Jim Wynorski and starring Jennifer Love Hewitt.

== Plot ==
Nine year old Heather Lofton comes from a very rich family, but somehow she's not so lucky; in fact, her stepmother can't stand her. Heather is forced to escape away from home, searching for her real mother. The woman Heather has been put in the care of hires a bounty hunter to find her. But in the process, she frames him, and he becomes wanted for kidnapping her.

== Cast ==
- Jennifer Love Hewitt as Heather Lofton (credited as Love Hewitt)
- Howard Hesseman as Nick Frost
- Anita Morris as Sybil Lofton
- James Avery as Agent Noah Hollander
- Robert Fieldsteel as Agent Bellows
- Steve Landesberg as Harvey Lipschitz
- Terri Treas as Susan Ferris
- Paul Hertzberg as Delbert Botts
- Lenny Juliano as "Legs" Dooley
- Toni Naples as Biker Chick
- Dee Booher as Sarge

== See also ==
- List of American films of 1993
