= Jodie Fisher =

American actress

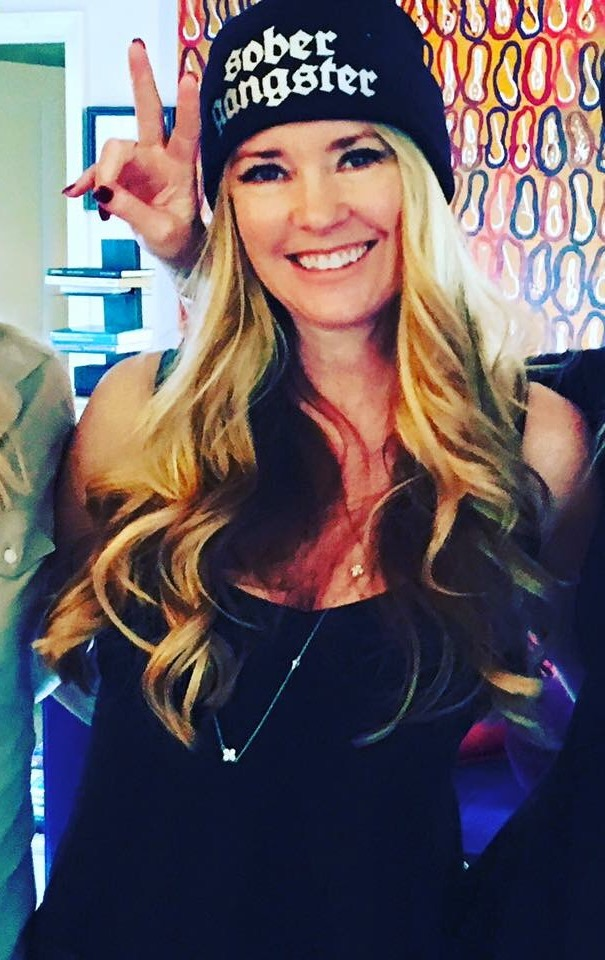
- Born: Jodie Lin Fisher; July 17, 1960 (age 66); Dallas, Texas, U.S.
- Occupation: Actress
- Spouse: Francis Joshua Coady (m. 1996; div. 2003)
- Website: jodiefisher.net

Jodie Lin Fisher (born July 17, 1960) is an American actress whose acting credits include NCIS: Los Angeles, and Little Big League as well as the reality TV series Age of Love.

== Early life ==
Jodie Fisher grew up in Dallas, Texas, and is of Scandinavian and Irish ancestry. She graduated from Texas Tech University with a Bachelor of Arts in Political Science, Dean's List.

== Career ==
Fisher has appeared as the lead actress in television and movie roles. Fisher's career gained momentum and she went on to appear in an episode of NCIS: Los Angeles and a sequel to the film Easy Rider as well as other films. Her latest project as of 2024 is Cannes Without A Plan. As of April 2019, she is a series regular on a new show called The Real Geezers of Beverly Hills Adjacent playing the role of "Julie".

Fisher was also a star of the 2007 reality TV series Age of Love which ran on NBC.

She worked as a facilitator for CEO Roundtable Events for Hewlett-Packard from 2007 to 2009.

== Filmography ==
=== Films ===
| Year | Film | Role | Director | Notes |
|---|---|---|---|---|
| 1990 | Blood, Sweat and Bullets | Joyce Gibson | Bob Cook | |
| 1992 | Intimate Obsession | Rachel Taylor | Lawrence Lanoff | |
| 1994 | Little Big League | Night Nurse #1 | Andrew Scheinman | |
| 1995 | Love and Happiness | Jerry | Jordan Alan | |
| 1996 | Body of Influence 2 | Leza Watkins | Brian J. Smith | |
| 1997 | Passion and Romance: Ocean of Dreams | Andrea | David Goldner | |
| 1998 | Sheer Passion | Dana | John Quinn | |
| 1998 | Dead by Dawn | Kim White | James Salisbury | |
| 1999 | Blood Dolls | Mercy Shaw | Charles Band | Direct-to-video release |
| 2012 | Easy Rider 2: The Ride Back | Bartender | Dustin Rikert | |
| 2014 | Lipstick & Liquor | Self | Lori Butterfield | Documentary |
| 2016 | The Witch Chronicles 2: Spirits of Ayahuasca | Kathryn Knight | Erik Glode and Edward Nyahay | |
| 2019 | White Christmas | Divorcee | Jeff Kanew | Direct-to-video release |
| 2022 | Never Better | Mom | Julianne Fox | |
| 2023 | We Kill for Love | Self | Anthony Penta | Documentary |
| 2024 | Cannes Without a Plan | Self | Julie Simone | Documentary |

=== Television ===
| Year(s) | Title | Role(s) | Notes |
|---|---|---|---|
| 1993–1998 | Silk Stalkings | Marcie Ridlin; Cody | S3E5 "Tough Love"; S7E22 "Genius" |
| 1996 | Night Stand with Dick Dietrick | Teri Cole Williamson | S1E27 "The Self-Improvement Show" |
| 1996–1997 | Life with Roger | Therapist | 20 episodes |
| 1997 | Gangster World | Housewife | TV movie |
| 2007 | Age of Love | Self | 2 episodes |
| 2010 | Charlotta-TS | Attorney | Web series |
| 2011 | NCIS: Los Angeles | Emma White | S3E6 "Lone Wolf" |
| 2014 | The Millionaire Matchmaker | Self | S7E15 "Make Time for Love and Betting on Change" |
| 2019 | The Real Geezers of Beverly Hills-Adjacent | Julie | S1E5 "Watch What You Say"; S1E6 "It Hits the Fan" |

=== Video games ===
| Year | Title | Role | Notes |
|---|---|---|---|
| 1997 | Star Trek: Starfleet Academy | Telepath | Credited as Jodie Fisher-Coady |
| 2012 | Call of Duty: Black Ops II | Girl in Towel | |

== Personal life ==
In August 2010, Fisher was identified as the filer of a sexual harassment complaint against Mark Hurd. After an internal investigation, he resigned as CEO of Hewlett-Packard for expense-account irregularities.

Fisher married Francis Coady in June 1996. Divorced after seven years, they have a son born in 1998.
