= Shelly Desai =

Indian-born American actor (1935–2026)

- Born: December 3, 1935; Bombay, Bombay Presidency, British India
- Died: February 10, 2026 (aged 90); Los Angeles, California, U.S.
- Occupation: Actor

Shailesh H. "Shelly" Desai (December 3, 1935 – February 10, 2026) was an Indian-born American character actor best known for his work in It's Always Sunny in Philadelphia and Men of a Certain Age. Desai's career on stage and screen spanned over 50 years. He also appeared in other series such as St. Elsewhere, The A-Team, Star Trek: The Next Generation, ER and Curb Your Enthusiasm and films such as Thelma & Louise (1991), Escape from L.A. (1996), Here Comes the Boom (2012) and Paul Blart: Mall Cop 2 (2014).

Before becoming a screen actor, Desai appeared in Broadway and off-Broadway productions, including At the Hawks Well, Jungle of Cities, Gurney Campbell's Gandhi, and A Talent For Murder. His stage work also included A Journal of the Plague Year.

Desai died in Los Angeles on February 10, 2026, at the age of 90. He was survived by his widow (Phyllis Desai), two stepdaughters and three grandchildren.
