= Mega Babies =

Television series

- The English Mega Babies logo. From left to right: Derrick, Meg and Buck.
- Genre: Action-adventure; Gross-out humor Toilet humor Superhero
- Created by: Christian Tremblay; Yvon Tremblay
- Directed by: Kevin Patrick Currie
- Voices of: Sonja Ball Dean Hagopian Jaclyn Linetsky Bronwen Mantel Laura Teasdale Arthur Holden Danny Brochu Richard Dumont John Stocker Eleanor Noble James Pidgeon Michel Perron Terrence Scammell
- Narrated by: Terrence Scammell
- Music by: James Fieldman; Gary Guttman
- Countries of origin: Canada; United States
- Original language: English
- No. of seasons: 2
- No. of episodes: 26 (52 segments)

Production
- Executive producers: Jacques Pettigrew Michel Lemire; Loris Kramer Gary Goddard
- Producer: Louis Duquet
- Running time: 21–22 minutes (10–11 minutes per segment)
- Production company: CinéGroupe Landmark Entertainment Group Sony Wonder

Original release
- Network: Teletoon(Canada); Fox Family Channel (US)
- Release: October 10, 1999 – April 22, 2000

Mega Babies is a 1999 animated television series created by the brothers Christian and Yvon Tremblay, who previously had made the Hanna-Barbera show SWAT Kats: The Radical Squadron. It was produced by CinéGroupe and Landmark Entertainment Group for Sony Wonder.

The series was broadcast on Fox Family Channel and Teletoon. The show was also aired in UK on Sky One's weekday mornings and later repeated on Channel 5 on weekend mornings between 2001 and 2002.

== Synopsis ==
The show is about a trio of mutant infant children who fight off evil monsters and aliens. Their names are Meg, Derrick and Buck and their caregiver's name is Nurse Lazlo. The show takes place in Your City, USA.

After their birth, they were brought to an orphanage. When the entire Solar System aligned itself, the children and their nurse were struck by lightning. The children were given super strength and other super powers, and Nurse Lazlo's I.Q. rose.

== Voice actors ==
Buck was voiced by Sonja Ball, Dean Hagopian voiced many male characters, Laura Teasdale did Derrick's voice, Meg was voiced by Jaclyn Linetsky, and Bronwen Mantel voiced Nurse Lazlo.

Even though the voices were recorded in Montreal, the voice directing was handled by Vancouver-based veteran voice actor and voice director Terry Klassen. This was the only time that Klassen had ever voice-directed an animated project outside of Vancouver. During the later episodes, Terrence Scammell, who also voiced several characters in the series, as well as providing the main title narration, took over as voice director.

== Production ==
The show was announced in January 1999 as a co-production between CinéGroupe and Sony Wonder set to premier on the Fox Family Channel in fall of that year. The show was created by Christian and Yvon Tremblay and Landmark Entertainment Group budgeted between $5.9 million (C$9 million) and $6.6 million for 52 10-minute episodes, which were pre-produced in Montreal and animated in Asia, then bundled into 26 half-hour daily shows.

== Episodes ==
=== Season 1 (1999) ===
No. overall	No. in season	Title	Written by	Storyboarded by	Original release date
1a	1a	"Full Metal Grizz"	Kate Donahue & Scott Kreamer	Christian Tremblay	October 10, 1999
The Mega Babies' new neighbor doesn't know what he's gotten into when he babysits the three super-powered tykes.
1b	1b	"Attack of the Cownibals"	Michael Carnes & Josh Gilbert	Angus Bungay	October 10, 1999
Alien cows have invaded and are stealing all the milk on Earth, which is bad for the milk-loving Mega Babies.
2a	2a	"Molar Attack"	Erin Ehrlich	Boomstone	October 13, 1999
Meg is teething, and she's destroying everything in her path to find the right teething tool.
2b	2b	"The Boy in the Drastic Bubble"	Mitch Watson	Jeff Barker	October 13, 1999
A trouble-making imp plans to take over the Mega Babies' home by framing them for his destructive pranks.
3a	3a	"Chicken Pox Outbreak"	Lisa Malone	Jim Caswell	October 20, 1999
Derrick's fear of vaccination causes an outbreak of mutant chicken pox that threatens the world.
3b	3b	"Don't Let the Bed Bugs Bite"	John Paragon	Jeff Barker	October 20, 1999
Mutant bed bugs that grow giant in sunlight are loose in the city and one has apparently swallowed Lazlo.
4a	4a	"Adoption D-Day"	Ken Segall	Jeremy Hildebrand	October 27, 1999
Meg is adopted by a couple who turn out to be balloon-like aliens who only want her for her gas.
4b	4b	"Crustacean Frustration"	Russell Arch	Jeremy Hildebrand	October 27, 1999
Lazlo takes the babies to a seafood restaurant, but Derrick's shellfish allergy causes him to turn into different sea creatures every time he sneezes.
5a	5a	"The In Breed"	Michael Carnes & Josh Gilbert	Normand DeRepentigny	November 3, 1999
Lazlo takes the babies on a road trip, but the babies end up taken by a family of hillbillies.
5b	5b	"Destructive Nature"	William Forrest Cluverius	Karen Lloyd	November 3, 1999
The great outdoors will never be the same when Lazlo takes the Mega Babies camping.
6a	6a	"The Island of Dr. Thoreau"	Russell Arch	Normand DeRepentigny	November 10, 1999
Lazlo and the babies become shipwrecked on the island home of a mad scientist and his freaky animal experiments.
6b	6b	"Journey to the Center of the Sewer"	Michael Carnes & Josh Gilbert	Marco Menard	November 10, 1999
Meg and Derrick chase a ball down into the sewer and stumble upon an evil fast food chef's plan to take over the world.
7a	7a	"Inner Ear Inferno"	Erin Ehrlich	Zoran Vanjaka	November 12, 1999
When Derrick needs his ear cleaned, Meg and Buck shrink down to give it a thorough cleaning.
7b	7b	"Lost Freeway"	Kate Donahue & Scott Kreamer	Luc Savoie	November 15, 1999
A road trip turns treacherous when Lazlo and the babies get lost on a freeway full of bizarre creatures and characters.
8a	8a	"Dr. Franken-Buck"	Matt Mallach	Normand DeRepentigny	November 17, 1999
Buck eats a "smart" cookie and becomes a genius bent on world domination.
8b	8b	"Intergalactic Battle of the Babies"	Susie Geiser & Todd Rohrbacher	Jeff Barker	November 17, 1999
The Mega Babies compete against alien babies in an intergalactic competition to win an amazing playset.
9a	9a	"The Evil Eye"	Lisa Malone	Dan Leveille	November 24, 1999
A trip to the pool has the Mega Babies facing off against a sentient pink eye virus.
9b	9b	"A Mega Christmas"	William Forrest Cluverius	Richard Forgues	November 24, 1999
The Mega Babies must save Christmas when an alien shapeshifter replaces Santa Claus in his evil scheme to ruin the holidays.
10a	10a	"Alien Withdrawal"	Michael Carnes & Josh Gilbert	Marc Simard	December 1, 1999
The babies are caught in the middle of a bank robbery by alien collectors after three very rare coins.
10b	10b	"Nursery Slimes"	Kate Donahue & Scott Kreamer	Richard Forgues	December 1, 1999
Lazlo leaves the babies at a fancy daycare, where they cause their usual mayhem and drive the teacher crazy.
11a	11a	"Ice Ice Baby"	Jim Newman & Keith van Straaten	Jim Caswell	December 8, 1999
The babies must save the day when a frostbitten ice skater kidnaps her competition to ensure her victory.
11b	11b	"Nightmare of the Sleepwalker"	Susie Geiser & Todd Rohrbacher	Rick Thomas & Marc Simard	December 8, 1999
When Buck starts sleepwalking, Meg and Derrick try to keep him from getting into trouble.
12a	12a	"The Flight of the Killer Zombees"	Erin Ehrlich	Jeff Barker	December 20, 1999
After Derrick inadvertently destroys their hive, the babies must save the Earth from a swarm of angry alien bees.
12b	12b	"If a Wood Chuck Upchucks"	Mitch Watson	Karen Lloyd	December 20, 1999
The babies go to an amusement park for a day of fun while the security personnel try and rein in their playful mayhem.
13a	13a	"Berried Alive"	John Paragon	Zoran Vanjaka	December 26, 1999
Experimental seeds wind up in the babies' garden and grow into metal-eating blueberry monsters.
13b	13b	"Insepction Insurrection"	Kate Donahue & Scott Kreamer	Normand DeRepentigny	December 26, 1999
A bump on the head makes Lazlo behave like a baby, just as a state inspector, who is secretly an evil alien, comes to evaluate her.

=== Season 2 (2000) ===
No. overall	No. in season	Title	Written by	Storyboarded by	Original release date
14a	1a	"Exterminator Bob"	William Forrest Cluverius	Richard Forgues	March 6, 2000
After Lazlo's growth serum creates giant roaches, an evil exterminator plots to use them to take over the world.
14b	1b	"Vampire Girls"	Robert Gaylor	Dan Leveille	March 6, 2000
Meg is hypnotized by a group of teenage vampires who use mind controlling cookies to make the citizens build a dome to block the sunlight.
15a	2a	"Portrait of a Madman"	Michael Carnes & Josh Gilbert	Normand DeRepentigny	March 8, 2000
Wanting pictures of the babies to show off, Lazlo takes them to a photographer who plans to steal their youth for himself.
15b	2b	"The Potty's Over"	Susie Geiser & Todd Rohrbacher	Jeff Barker	March 8, 2000
Lazlo starts potty-training the babies just as an evil diaper manufacturer tries to eliminate the potty-training mascot.
16a	3a	"Beach from Beyond"	Kate Donahue & Scott Kreamer	Vida Escauriaga	March 15, 2000
The babies take an overworked Lazlo to the beach to help her unwind, but she keeps seeing danger everywhere.
16b	3b	"Toxic Hobby"	Lisa Fineberg Malone	Normand DeRepentigny	March 15, 2000
When the babies use a toxic substance to paint, the drawings end up coming to life and go on a rampage through the city.
17a	4a	"Killer Dillers from Outer Space"	Glenn Leopold	Zoran Vanjaka	March 19, 2000
A race of dill pickles from beyond the Moon want to exact revenge on humanity for every pickle that's been eaten.
17b	4b	"It's My Party and I'll Puke if I Want To"	Mitch Watson	Karen Lloyd	March 19, 2000
Lazlo takes the babies to the birthday party of the richest girl in the city. But the magician plots to kidnap her.
18a	5a	"Re-Usable Terror"	William Forrest Cluverius	Jeff Barker	March 25, 2000
A crazed recycle man builds a mechanical army from recycled parts, and the robots threaten to recycle the whole city.
18b	5b	"Poop Doggy Dogg"	Ken Segall	Jeff Barker	March 25, 2000
Lazlo and the babies create a mechanical dog which soon gets out of control.
19a	6a	"Hot Rod Babies"	Michael Carnes & Josh Gilbert	Normand DeRepentigny	March 26, 2000
The babies go to a demolition derby and face against a trio of monster trucks with artificial intelligence.
19b	6b	"Gross'ery Shopping"	Kate Donahue & Scott Kreamer	Richard Forgues	March 26, 2000
When the owner of a grocery store is thawed out, he turns loose an army of evil food monsters.
20a	7a	"The Creature from the Blackhead Lagoon"	Sean Abley	Normand DeRepentigny	April 1, 2000
The babies help their new babysitter remove a bad case of acne, but their solution releases a hoard of living pimples.
20b	7b	"Balemtime's Day"	Kate Donahue & Scott Kreamer	Karen Lloyd	April 1, 2000
Meg is not into celebrating Valentine's Day, and she has a nightmare where villains from the past compete for her love.
21a	8a	"Bucky at the Bat"	Susie Geiser & Todd Rohrbacher	Vida Escauriaga	April 2, 2000
When the home city's baseball team starts losing, Buck is enlisted to help them win the game.
21b	8b	"A Boy Named Su"	J. Harry Hardman	Normand DeRepentigny	April 2, 2000
Meg falls for a sumo wrestler and must rescue him when he is captured.
22a	9a	"Deep Booger"	William Forrest Cluverius	Zoran Vanjaka	April 8, 2000
When a giant booger from space threatens the Earth, the babies are sent on a mission to stop it before it's too late.
22b	9b	"Shopping Mall Madness"	Lisa Malone	Richard Forgues	April 8, 2000
The babies visit the mall in the hopes of getting to meet their favorite TV star.
23a	10a	"Little Beauty Shop of Horrors"	Russell Arch	Jeff Barker	April 9, 2000
The babies go to a barber shop. When the barbers find out how fast their hair grows back, they decide to use it to sell for profit.
23b	10b	"Chewing the Fat"	Robert Gaylor	Tom Nesbitt	April 9, 2000
After Lazlo decides to get a liposuction, the extracted fat cells escape and go after everyone else who has had liposuction.
24a	11a	"Let it Rip"	Dean Stefan	Karine Charlebois, Normand DeRepentigny & Stan Gadziola	April 15, 2000
Meg has gas from eating POW Chips. So Nurse Lazlo, Derrick, and Buck find a solution to stop Meg from getting gassy. Meanwhile, some aliens crash into the orphanage.
24b	11b	"Toys of the Future"	Michael Carnes & Josh Gilbert	Jeremy Hildebrand	April 15, 2000
Meg, Derrick and Buck are taken to the local toy company to test their latest products.
25a	12a	"Summer of Sandman"	Jesse Dienstag	Stan Gadziola	April 16, 2000
When everyone refuses to fall asleep when the Sandman wants them to, the sleep inducer decides to extract his revenge.
25b	12b	"Curse of the Doo Doo Doll"	Cathy Shambley	Richard Forgues	April 16, 2000
A voodoo master creates a voodoo doll of Nurse Lazlo.
26a	13a	"Golf for It"	Susie Geiser & Todd Rohrbacher	Karine Charlebois	April 22, 2000
The babies play a round in the city's most dangerous miniature golf course.
26b	13b	"Snow Long Suckers"	William Forrest Cluverius	Normand DeRepentigny	April 22, 2000
During a trip to the snowy mountains, the babies must stop an evil snowboarder before he freezes the entire planet.

== Video game ==
A video game based on and having the same name as the show was developed and published by Global Star Software in 2000, exclusively for PC.
