= Paul Goebel =

Paul Goebel could refer to:

- Paul G. Goebel (1901–1988), American football player and politician
- Paul Goebel (television personality) (born 1968), American actor and comedian

== See also ==
- Paul Goble (disambiguation)
- Paul Joseph Goebbels (1897–1945), Minister of Propaganda of Nazi Germany
