= What's My Line? =

American panel game show

- Genre: Panel show
- Directed by: Paul Munroe(1950); Franklin Heller(1950–1967); Frank Satenstein; Paul Alter(1957–1961); Ira Skutch; Lloyd Gross(1968–1975 syndicated version)
- Presented by: John Charles Daly; Wally Bruner; Larry Blyden
- Starring: Arlene Francis; Dorothy Kilgallen; Louis Untermeyer; Hal Block; Bennett Cerf; Steve Allen; Fred Allen; Soupy Sales
- Announcer: Lee Vines; Hal Simms; Ralph Paul; Johnny Olson; Chet Gould
- Country of origin: United States
- No. of seasons: 25
- No. of episodes: CBS: 876; Syndication: 1,320; Total: 2,196

Production
- Producers: Mark Goodson; Bill Todman
- Running time: 25–29 minutes (CBS); 22–23 minutes (syndication)
- Production companies: Goodson-Todman Productions; CBS Productions (1958-67)

Original release
- Network: CBS
- Release: February 2, 1950 – September 3, 1967
- Network: Syndicated
- Release: September 9, 1968 – September 3, 1975

Related
- I've Got a Secret; To Tell the Truth

What's My Line? is an American panel game show that originally aired on CBS from 1950 through 1967, and which had subsequent revivals. The game uses celebrity panelists to question contestants in order to determine their occupation. The majority of the contestants were from the general public, but there was one weekly celebrity "mystery guest" for whom the panelists were blindfolded. The series is one of the longest-running American primetime network television game-shows. Originally moderated by John Charles Daly and most frequently with regular panelists Dorothy Kilgallen, Arlene Francis, and Bennett Cerf, What's My Line? won three Emmy Awards for Best Quiz or Audience Participation Show in 1952, 1953, and 1958 and the Golden Globe for Best TV Show in 1962.

More than 700 episodes exist as kinescope recordings, the prevailing recording medium for recording live television until the 1960s emergence of videotape. Many early episodes were lost due to budgetary limitations from 1950 and 1952. All episodes from July 1952 to September 1967 were preserved in the archives of producers Mark Goodson and Bill Todman, but by 1975, some of the episodes had been lost.

After CBS cancelled the series in 1967, it returned the following year in a syndicated version for local television stations that committed to airing it five days a week. This syndicated version was broadcast until 1975 and was hosted by Wally Bruner and later by Larry Blyden. There have been a dozen international versions, radio versions, and a live stage version. Revivals in the United States have been proposed several times, but all failed to go past the planning stages. New episodes have not been created for American television since December 12, 1974.

In 2013, TV Guide ranked What's My Line? ninth on its list of the 60 greatest game shows ever and Time ranked it as one of the 100 "All-Time" TV shows ever.

== Original CBS series (1950–1967) ==
Produced by Mark Goodson and Bill Todman for CBS, the show was initially called Occupation Unknown before deciding on the name What's My Line?. The original series, which was usually broadcast live, debuted on Thursday, February 2, 1950, at 8:00 p.m. ET. After airing alternate Wednesdays, then alternate Thursdays, finally on October 1, 1950, it had settled into its weekly Sunday 10:30 p.m. ET slot where it would remain until the end of its network run on September 3, 1967.

In 1958, Goodson-Todman Productions decided to sell the series to CBS for an undisclosed amount of price, although Goodson-Todman decided to retain talent for the series. The practice continued long after the show moved to syndication, until 1971, when G-T bought back the property after CBS was spun off its syndicated division into Viacom.

Starting in July 1959, and continuing until July 1967, the show would occasionally record episodes onto quadruplex videotape for playback at a future date. In July 1959, this was state-of-the-art technology. At that time, the immediate concern of Mark Goodson and Bill Todman was that John Daly, anchor of the ABC network's nightly newscasts, would be allowed to visit Moscow to cover, in that capacity, a breaking news story. While Daly moderated the first live episode after his return from Moscow, he praised his employers' use of videotape. In such instances, cast and crew worked on two episodes consecutively during the same Sunday night: the "taped" one, followed immediately by the "live" one. The cast and crew began taking "summer breaks" from the show in July 1961, through July 1967. The closing credits of each prerecorded episode included an acknowledgment of the prerecorded status by the offscreen announcer.

=== Hosts and panelists ===
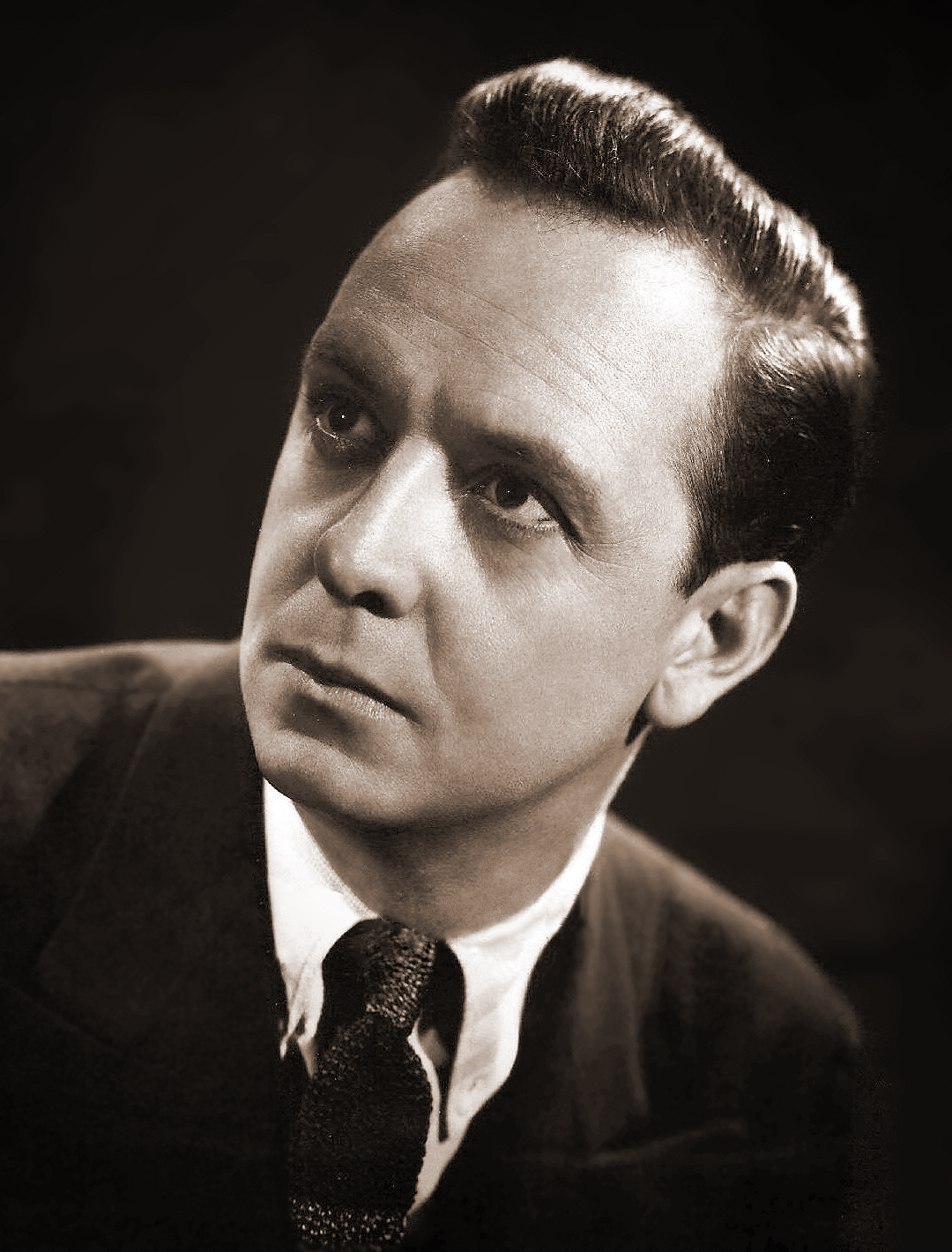
Host John Charles Daly's 1950 CBS publicity photo for What's My Line?

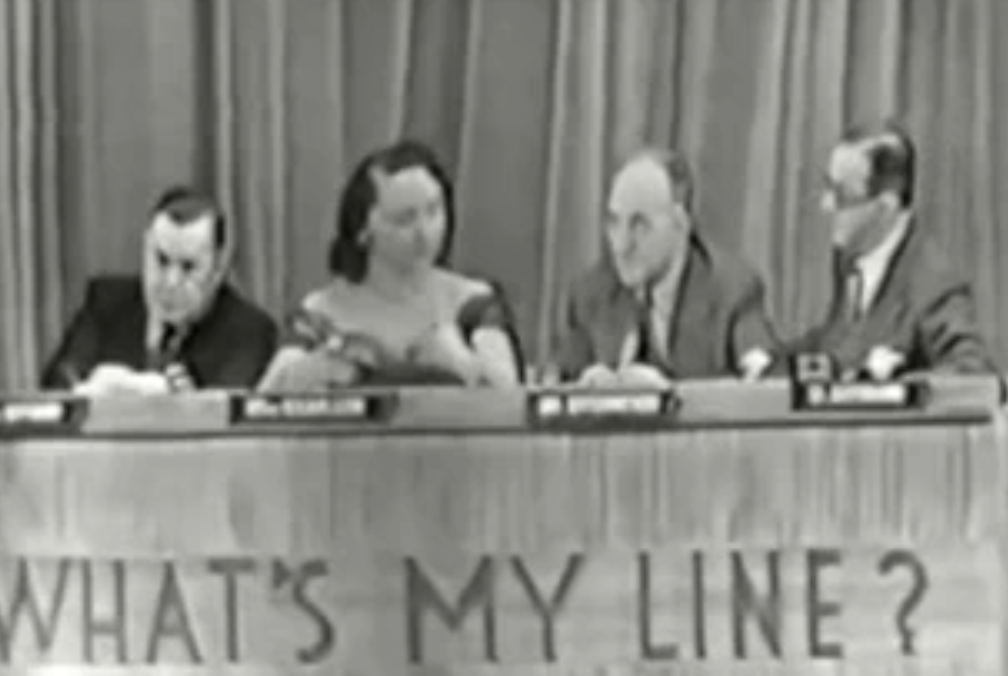
Original panelists from the premiere broadcast, February 2, 1950

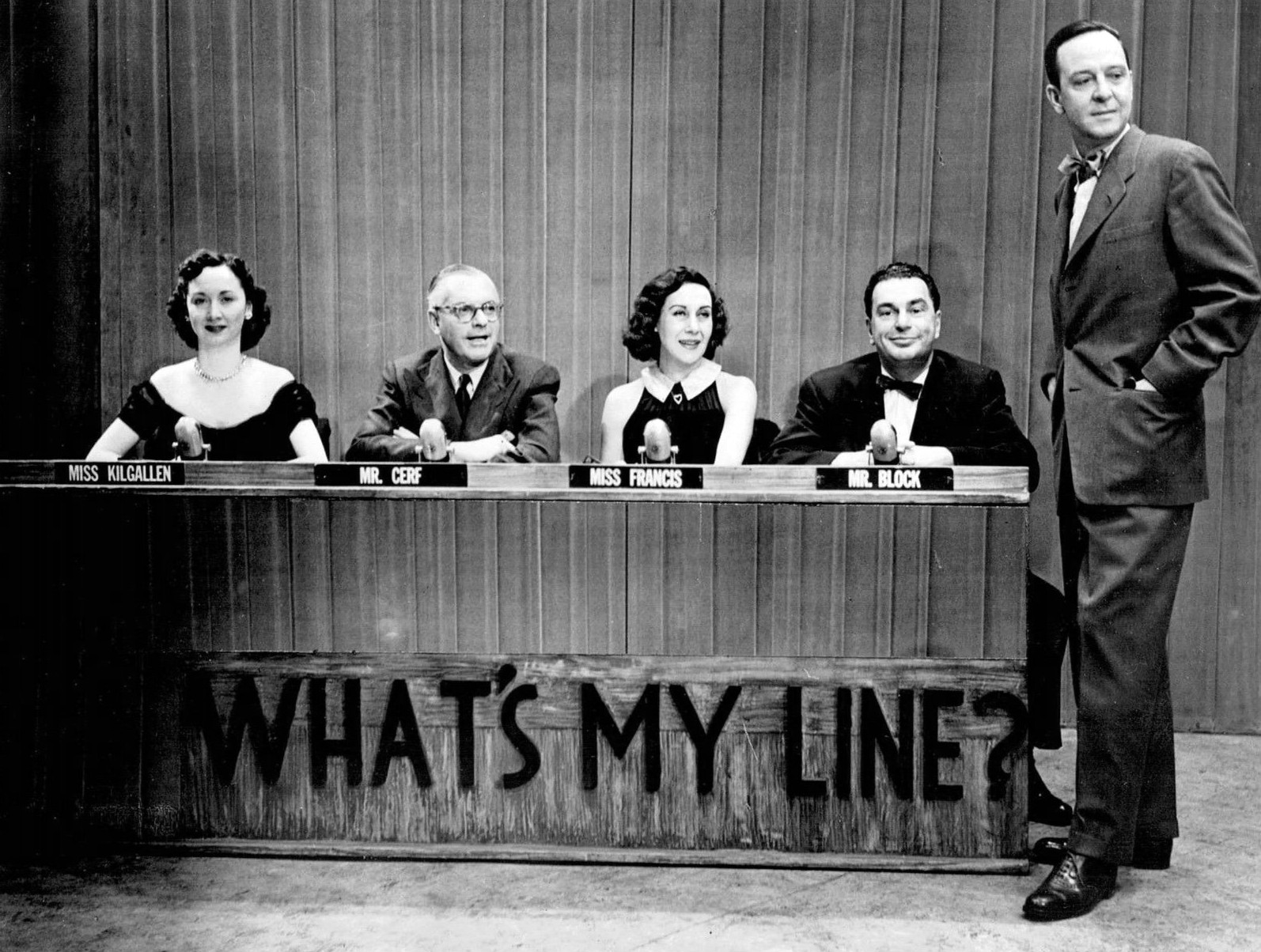
The panel in 1952. From left: Dorothy Kilgallen, Bennett Cerf, Arlene Francis and Hal Block with John Daly as the host.

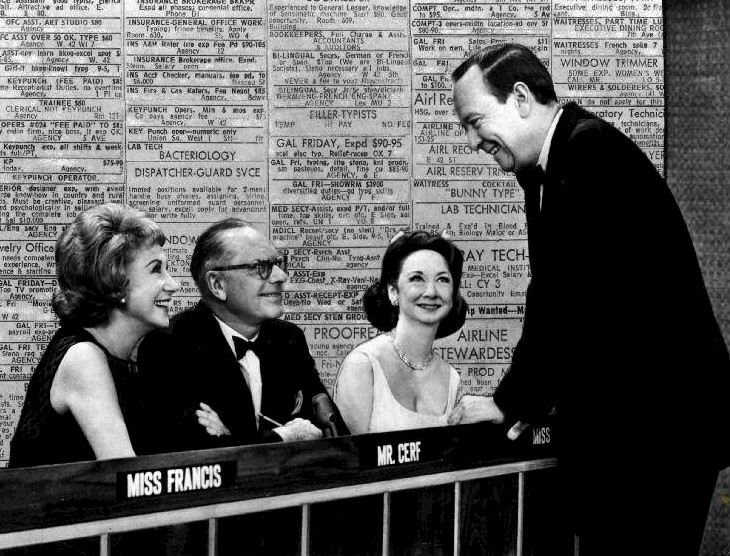
(l–r) Arlene Francis, Bennett Cerf, Dorothy Kilgallen and John Daly on the 15th anniversary show in 1965

The host, then called the moderator, was veteran radio and television newsman John Charles Daly. Clifton Fadiman, Eamonn Andrews, and Random House co-founding publisher and panelist Bennett Cerf substituted on the four occasions when Daly was unavailable.

The show featured a panel of four celebrities who questioned the contestants. On the initial program of February 2, 1950, the panel comprised former New Jersey governor Harold Hoffman, columnist Dorothy Kilgallen, poet Louis Untermeyer, and psychiatrist Richard Hoffmann. The panel varied somewhat in the following weeks, but after the first few broadcasts, during the show's earliest period the panel generally consisted of Kilgallen, actress Arlene Francis, Untermeyer and comedy writer Hal Block. Publisher Bennett Cerf replaced Untermeyer as a regular panelist in 1951, and comedian Steve Allen replaced Block in 1953. Allen left in 1954 to launch The Tonight Show, and he was replaced by comedian Fred Allen (no relation), who remained on the panel until his death in 1956.

Fred Allen was not replaced on a permanent basis, and for the majority of the show's network run, between 1956 and 1965, the panel consisted of Kilgallen, Cerf, Francis and a fourth guest panelist. After Kilgallen's death in 1965, she was similarly not replaced with a permanent panelist, and for the show's final two years, the panel consisted of Cerf, Francis and two guests.

At various times, a regular panelist might take a vacation or be absent from an episode due to outside commitments. On these occasions, a guest panelist would take their spot. The most frequent guest panelist was Arlene Francis's husband Martin Gabel, who appeared 112 times over the years. Other frequent guest panelists include Tony Randall, Robert Q. Lewis and Phyllis Newman. Dick Cavett, in an early television appearance in Fred Allen's vacated chair in 1966, noted that the mystery guest was probably wondering who Cavett was.

Regular announcers included Lee Vines, who served from 1950 to 1955; Hal Simms, from 1955 to 1961; Ralph Paul, whose tenure was confined to 1961; and Johnny Olson, perhaps the best known of Goodson-Todman's television announcers, whose tenure began in 1961 and ran until the show's cancellation in 1967.

=== Gameplay ===
What's My Line? was a guessing game in which the four panelists attempted to determine the occupation (i.e., "line [of work]") of a guest. In the case of the famous mystery guest each week, the panel sought to determine the identity of the celebrity. Panelists were required to probe by asking only yes–no questions. A typical episode featured two standard rounds (sometimes a third, and very rarely a rushed fourth) plus one mystery guest round. On the occasions on which there were two mystery guests, the first would usually appear as the first contestant.

==== Standard rounds ====
For the first few seasons, contestants would "sign in" by writing their name on a chalkboard, and meet the panel up close for a casual inspection, and the panel was allowed one initial "wild" guess. The first contestant on What's My Line? was Pat Finch, a hat check girl at the Stork Club. Finch appeared again on the fifth anniversary show (with the "line" of "chorus girl" appearing in the musical Fanny) and on the final broadcast in 1967 as a guest.

Beginning in 1955 Daly simply greeted and seated the contestant, who later met the panel at the end of the game. Additionally, starting April 17, 1955, the panel stopped taking initial guesses. The contestant's line was then revealed to the studio and home audiences, and Daly would tell the panel whether the contestant was salaried or self-employed, and from 1960 on, whether they dealt in a product or a service.

A panelist chosen by Daly would begin the game. If their question elicited a yes answer, they continued questioning. When a question was answered no, questioning passed to the next panelist and $5 was added to the prize. The amount of the prize was tallied by Daly who flipped up to ten cards on his desk. A contestant won the top prize of $50 by giving ten no answers, or if time ran out, with Daly flipping all the cards. As Daly occasionally noted, "Ten flips and they (the panel) are a flop!" Daly later explained, after the show had finished its run on CBS, the maximum payout of $50 was to ensure the game was played only for enjoyment, and that there could never be even the appearance of impropriety. Later in the series, Daly would throw all the cards over with increasing frequency and arbitrariness (frequently to give a particularly interesting or worthy contestant the maximum available prize money), evidence the prize was secondary to game play.

Panelists had the option of passing to the next panelist—or even disqualifying themselves entirely if they somehow knew the contestant's occupation or identity (especially in the case of a mystery challenger) before the round. They could also request a conference, in which they had a short time for open discussion of ideas about occupations or lines of questioning.

Panelists adopted some basic binary search strategies, beginning with broad questions, such as whether the contestant worked for a for-profit corporation or non-profit organization or whether a product was alive, worn, or ingested. To increase the probability of affirmative answers, panelists would often phrase questions in the negative starting with "Is it something other than..." or "Can I rule out..."

The show popularized the phrase, "Is it bigger than a breadbox?" Steve Allen first posed this on January 18, 1953, and it was then refined over subsequent episodes. Soon, other panelists were asking this question as well. On one occasion the guest was a man who made breadboxes. Allen correctly guessed the guest's occupation when Daly could not restrain his laughter in response to Kilgallen asking, "Is it bigger than a breadbox?"

==== The mystery guest round ====
Blindfolds on for a mystery guest

The ultimate or penultimate round of an episode involved blindfolding the panel for a celebrity guest appearance (originally called "mystery challengers" by Daly) whom the panel had to identify by name, rather than occupation. (In the first episode, the mystery guest was New York Yankees shortstop Phil Rizzuto.) In the early years of the show, the questioning was the same as it was for regular contestants, but starting with the April 17, 1955 edition, panelists were only allowed one question at a time. Mystery guests usually came from the entertainment world, either stage, screen, television or sports. When mystery guests came from other walks of life or were non-famous individuals whom the panel but not the studio audience might know, they were usually played as standard rounds. However, the panel might be blindfolded, or the contestant might sign in simply as "X", depending on whether they would be known by name or sight.

Mystery guests would usually attempt to conceal their identities with disguised voices, much to the amusement of the studio audience. According to Cerf, the panel could often determine the identities of the mystery guests early, as they knew which celebrities were in town, or which major movies or plays were about to open. On those occasions, to provide the audience an opportunity to see the guest play the game, the panelists and host would typically allow questioning to pass around at least once before coming up with the correct guess. As Cerf admitted in the episode broadcast on November 27, 1966, his wife, Phyllis, was frequently told the name of the mystery guest beforehand.

Sometimes, two mystery guest rounds were played in an episode, with the additional round usually as the first round of the episode.

Most notably, the mystery guests ran the gamut of show business's most legendary icons, including Jack Benny, John Wayne, Gary Cooper, Elizabeth Taylor, Judy Garland, Ella Fitzgerald, Ava Gardner, Joan Crawford, Tallulah Bankhead, James Cagney, Julie Andrews, Jack Lemmon, Yul Brynner, Jackie Gleason, Barbra Streisand, Steve McQueen, Alfred Hitchcock, Doris Day, James Garner, Ronald Reagan, Jane Russell, Rosalind Russell, Fred Astaire, Helen Hayes, George Raft, Edward G. Robinson, Gene Autry, Lena Horne, Paul Newman and Joanne Woodward, Andy Griffith, Harry Belafonte, Ginger Rogers, Roy Rogers, Lucille Ball, Desi Arnaz, Bob Hope, Frank Sinatra, Dean Martin and Jerry Lewis, Sammy Davis Jr., Sophia Loren, Peter Lawford, Sean Connery, James Stewart, Henry Fonda, Salvador Dalí, Aretha Franklin, and many more.

=== Style ===
What's My Line? is known for its attention to manners and class. In its early years, business suits and street dresses were worn by the host and panelists, but by 1953, the men normally wore black suits with bow tie (a few guests in fact wore black tie) while female panelists donned formal gown and often gloves. Exceptions to this dress code were on the broadcasts immediately following the deaths of Fred Allen and Dorothy Kilgallen, in which the male cast members wore straight neckties and the women wore simpler dresses.

The game followed a line of formality and adherence to rules. Although using first names at other points, Daly usually addressed using surnames when passing the questioning to a particular panelist. He would also amiably chide the panel if they began a conference without first asking him.

However, even with such formality, Daly was not above trading bon mots with the panelists during the game, and Cerf would often attempt to make a pun of his name. Occasionally Daly would amiably one-up Cerf if he felt the pun was of lesser quality. Cerf also played a myriad of games with Daly's full name, John Charles Patrick Croghan Daly, reciting it correctly only a handful of times over the course of the series.

Often Daly would need to clarify a potentially confusing question, but he had a penchant for amusingly wordy, long-winded replies that often left panelists more confused than before, which Danny Kaye once parodied as a panelist. Daly was also scrupulous about providing answers that, did, in fact, answer questions as they were posed, and on more than one occasion, Daly "led the panel down the garden path" – a favorite phrase used when a technically correct (but perhaps incomplete or somewhat unhelpful) answer had proven misleading to the panelists.

=== Broadcast format ===
From 1950 to 1966, the game show was broadcast in black and white, as was typical of most game shows at the time. In September 1966, all three networks began broadcasting their prime-time schedules entirely in color television, including What's My Line? The new color episodes were preserved only with black-and-white kinescopes, however, and even several of those from 1967 were lost. The color composition of the What's My Line? soundstage has been lost to posterity.

The show began as a live broadcast but during the last eight years many episodes were videotaped weeks or months in advance of their telecasts. The show's announcer acknowledged this fact during the closing credits of every "prerecorded" episode.

==== Radio ====
In addition to the TV format, What's My Line? was also broadcast on network radio for a short time. From May 20 to August 27, 1952, an NBC Radio Network version was produced on Tuesday nights with the same cast as the TV version. After August 27, the program was then broadcast live on CBS Radio on Wednesday nights at 8:00 PM for 10 months, concluding July 1, 1953. The radio version is notable for the only appearances of Marlene Dietrich, Constance Bennett, and Marlon Brando.

==== 1953 Community Chest Special ====
A Community Chest Special, completely separate from the regular production of episodes, was broadcast live on all the major networks (CBS, ABC, NBC, and DuMont) on the afternoon of Sunday, September 27, 1953.

=== Production practices ===
==== On-camera ====
The program began with Daly and panel entering from off-stage as they were introduced. Prior to 1954, both panelists and host began the program in their seats, but this was changed, responding to letters asking what panelists looked like away from their seats. The first panelist would be introduced by the announcer following the show's introduction, and each panelist would introduce the next in turn, with the last introducing Daly. During his tenure, Hal Block sat in the final seat and began the practice of introducing Daly with a pun. Upon his departure, Bennett Cerf took over this position. Cerf's introductions of Daly were generally straightforward in his earliest years on the show, but as time went by Cerf expanded these introductions, often telling long jokes which he tied to Daly in some way.

To begin a round, Daly would invite the contestant to "come in and sign in, please," which, by 1960, had evolved to the more familiar "enter and sign in, please." The contestant entered by writing his or her name on a small sign-in board. (For the first few telecasts, the contestants signed their names on an artist's sketch pad; but when the brightness of the studio lights made it difficult for the signatures to be seen clearly by the viewers, the white sketchpad was replaced by a black chalkboard.) Daly would then usually ask where the guest lived and, with a woman, if she should be addressed as "Miss" or "Mrs." Early in the show's run, the panel was allowed to inspect contestants, studying their hands, or label on their suit or asking them to make a muscle.

While ostensibly a game show, if there was time, it also was an opportunity to conduct interviews. Line's sister show, I've Got a Secret, and later, the syndicated version of WML engaged in the practice of contestants demonstrating their talents. However, despite frequent requests by the panel, particularly Arlene Francis, such demonstrations rarely occurred as according to executive producer Gil Fates, Daly was not fond of this practice.

==== Sponsors ====
After the first four episodes, the show gained its initial sponsor when Jules Montenier paid to have his product, Stopette spray deodorant, featured in advertising on the program. This involved featuring the product in the show's opening, on the front of the panel's desk, above the sign-in board, and on Daly's scorecards. In his last years, Cerf explained to interviewer Robbin Hawkins that Montenier was ultimately ruined by his refusal to abandon or share sponsorship as the show entered new markets and became too expensive. After Montenier sold Stopette to Helene Curtis, the series was sponsored by a variety of companies which were either regular or rotating. Sponsors were accorded the same exposure on the set as Stopette. One of the first rotating sponsors, which actually came before Montenier's sale of Stopette to Helene Curtis (who continued to sponsor the program after the purchase and still promoted Stopette in their advertising), was the Remington Rand Corporation, who used their time to promote their line of electric shaver and computers such as the UNIVAC.

Near the end of its run, sponsors would be introduced in the opening title and given commercials during the show, but would not be displayed on the set. Frequent sponsors in the 1960s were Kellogg's cereals, Allstate Insurance, and Geritol.

==== Behind the scenes ====
Unknown to the public, mystery guests were paid $500 (equal to $6,691 in 2025) as an appearance fee, whether they won or lost the game. This was in addition to the maximum $50 (equal to $669 in 2025) game winnings, which guests sometimes donated to charity. Guest panelists were paid $750 (equal to $10,036 in 2025) as an appearance fee. The regular panelists were under contract and were paid "much more," according to Fates. Bennett Cerf explained that when he became a permanent member of the program, he was paid $300 (equal to $4,015 in 2025) per week, and he told Robbin Hawkins in their interview that by the end of the series, the panelists were being paid "scandalous amounts of money".

==== Studio locations ====
The first four episodes (#001 – #004; February – March 16, 1950) were broadcast live from a converted loft at the former CBS Studio 41 Grand Central Studios at Grand Central Terminal (15 Vanderbilt Ave., NY).

Beginning with the first Wednesday episode (#005; April 12, 1950, and continuing until around 1951), the show was broadcast from the now demolished CBS Studio 51 (Maxine Elliott's Theatre, aka Maxine Elliott Theatre, 109 W. 39th St., NY).

At least by episode #034 (January 21, 1951), the show moved to CBS Studio 59 (Mansfield Theatre, later renamed the Brooks Atkinson Theatre in 1960, 256 W. 47th St., NY), and stayed until Episode #516, June 5, 1960. Meanwhile, the concurrent 1952–1953 Radio edition, at least during the CBS run, was heard live from CBS Studio Building 22 (49 E. 52nd St., NY).

Episode #225 (September 19, 1954) was a color edition of the show, broadcast live from CBS Studio 72 (on Manhattan's Upper West Side, Broadway at 81st St., NY). This predated the show's eventual move to color by 12 years.

Episode #323 (August 12, 1956), in conjunction with the 1956 Democratic National Convention, was a special Chicago episode broadcast from the studios of CBS owned-and-operated WBBM-TV (630 N. McClurg Ct., Chicago, IL).

Episode #397 (January 12, 1958) was a special Hollywood episode broadcast from CBS Television City (7800 Beverly Boulevard, Los Angeles, CA). The moderator and panel's desks were not brought over, as they had been for the Chicago special.

Beginning with episode #517 through episode #829 (June 12, 1960 – September 4, 1966), the show used CBS Studio 52 (254 W. 54th St., NY; the future Studio 54). The last episode aired in black & white was taped on July 17, 1966, and the last episode to be produced there in black & white aired live on July 24.

For the final season, from episode #830 to episode #876 (September 11, 1966 – September 3, 1967), in conjunction with the program's permanent move to color, the show used CBS Studio 50 (later renamed the Ed Sullivan Theater, 1697 Broadway at 53rd St., NY).

=== The final CBS network show ===
CBS announced in early 1967 that a number of game shows, including What's My Line?, were to be canceled at the end of the season. Bennett Cerf wrote that the network had decided that game shows were no longer suitable for prime time, and that the news was broken by The New York Times on February 14 before anyone involved with the show was notified. The primary reason for the cancellation, along with the other panel shows CBS aired in prime time, was that the programs' low overall viewership—the key metric of success during Michael Dann's time with the network—could no longer justify their presence even as the shows continued to turn a profit with their low production costs.

The 876th and final CBS telecast of What's My Line? aired on September 3, 1967; it was highlighted by clips from past telecasts, a visit by the show's first contestants, a challenger from the New York unemployment office, and the final mystery guest, who was John Daly himself. Daly had always been the emergency mystery guest in case the scheduled guest was unable to appear on the live broadcast, but this had never occurred. Mark Goodson, Bill Todman and (briefly) Johnny Olson appeared on-camera as well.

=== Broadcast history and Nielsen ratings ===
| Season | | Time slot | Rank | Rating |
|---|---|---|---|---|
| 1 | 1950–1951 | Sunday nights at 10:30 PM | Not in the Top 30 | |
| 2 | 1951–1952 | Sunday nights at 10:30 PM | Not in the Top 30 | |
| 3 | 1952–1953 | Sunday nights at 10:30 PM | #20 | 35.3 (tie) |
| 4 | 1953–1954 | Sunday nights at 10:30 PM | #28 | 29.6 |
| 5 | 1954–1955 | Sunday nights at 10:30 PM | Not in the Top 30 | |
| 6 | 1955–1956 | Sunday nights at 10:30 PM | Not in the Top 30 | |
| 7 | 1956–1957 | Sunday nights at 10:30 PM | #26 | 28.9 (tie) |
| 8 | 1957–1958 | Sunday nights at 10:30 PM | Not in the Top 30 | |
| 9 | 1958–1959 | Sunday nights at 10:30 PM | Not in the Top 30 | |
| 10 | 1959–1960 | Sunday nights at 10:30 PM | #27 | 23.9 |
| 11 | 1960–1961 | Sunday nights at 10:30 PM | #22 | 23.1 |
| 12 | 1961–1962 | Sunday nights at 10:30 PM | Not in the Top 30 | |
| 13 | 1962–1963 | Sunday nights at 10:30 PM | #13 | 25.6 |
| 14 | 1963–1964 | Sunday nights at 10:30 PM | #24 | 22.6 |
| 15 | 1964–1965 | Sunday nights at 10:30 PM | Not in the Top 30 | |
| 16 | 1965–1966 | Sunday nights at 10:30 PM | Not in the Top 30 | |
| 17 | 1966–1967 | Sunday nights at 10:30 PM | Not in the Top 30 | |

== Syndicated revival (1968–1975) ==
=== Premiere ===
Once the original What's My Line? had ended, Goodson-Todman struck a deal with CBS's syndication arm, which in time became Viacom (now CBS Media Ventures), to syndicate a new weekday videotaped edition, beginning one year after the network version's cancellation. CBS initially retained copyright to the series and trademark until 1971, although Goodson-Todman took over full time production. This version became a staple of local stations' afternoon and early evening schedules, especially from the 1971–72 season onward, when the FCC forced networks to cede one half-hour to their affiliates. The Prime Time Access Rule was intended to permit local stations to produce news and public affairs programming, but instead many of them turned to programs like WML, as practically all stations outside the largest markets found it unprofitable to produce their own shows locally.

The first three seasons (1968–1971) originated from Studio 50, the home of the final year of the original series, but with a new, modern-design set. In 1971, production of What's My Line? moved from the Broadway studio to Studio 6-A at NBC in Rockefeller Center, and the series remained there for the rest of its run, with a set redesign in 1974 for the final season. As they had with the original series, Goodson-Todman went to ABC News to seek a host, whose title had ceased to be that of "moderator," and hired Wally Bruner to take over for John Charles Daly. Bruner left the series at the conclusion of its fourth season in 1972, and Broadway actor Larry Blyden, who had already helmed several other gameshows and served as both a Line panelist and mystery guest in the past, stepped in at the beginning of the 1972–1973 season to host the remaining three seasons.

=== Panelists ===
The syndicated edition had two regular panelists for its entire run, with comedian Soupy Sales joining the returning Arlene Francis. Bennett Cerf appeared as a guest on an irregular basis until he died during production of the fourth season in 1971. Other panelists included Alan Alda, his father Robert Alda, Joanna Barnes, Joyce Brothers, Jack Cassidy, Bert Convy, Joel Grey, Elaine Joyce, Ruta Lee, Sam Levene, Meredith MacRae, Henry Morgan, Jerry Orbach, Gene Rayburn, Nipsey Russell, Gene Shalit, Dana Valery and Anita Gillette.

=== Look and style ===
Unlike its predecessor, the syndicated What's My Line? did not emphasize formality as the panelists did not dress in formal wear. In addition, the panelists were simply referred to by name and only their first names were displayed in front of them. The show did manage to keep some elements of the original series intact, as the cartoon introduction used during the final two seasons on CBS was reused with new music added. The panelists also entered in the same manner as they had before with Soupy Sales (or the panelist occupying the seat farthest left when he was absent) coming out first and introducing the person sitting next to them, and continuing down the line to Arlene Francis (or whoever occupied her seat while she was absent), who would then introduce the host. That practice continued until the beginning of the final season in 1974, when announcer Chet Gould began introducing the panelists and host Blyden at once, in a conventional fashion.

=== Who's Who? segment ===
In the 1960s and 1970s syndicated run, whenever there was extra time, a special game was instituted called "Who's Who". Four members of the studio audience were lined up on stage, and their occupations were printed on cards. Each panelist had 20 seconds to take those occupation cards to the appropriate contestant (the ones who they thought had that occupation). Each time one panelist failed, the audience team won $25 and another panelist took a turn. If all four panelists failed, each member of the team won an additional bonus prize. The game ended when the panel was stumped or if a panelist placed the occupations with the right contestants. If the panelists got it correct on the first try, the audience members received $5 and a year's supply of Turtle Wax.

The producers considered the revival a merger of What's My Line? and its 1950s spinoff, I've Got a Secret, which resulted in noticeable changes from the original. As with Secret, contestants frequently demonstrated their skill or product after the game. Bruner, and later Blyden, would preface the demonstrations by asking Lloyd Gross, who directed most of the editions, "Lloyd, would you open the curtains, please?" Dollar signs for "no" answers were replaced by sequential numbers. Mystery guest rounds were no longer scored and simply ended with a correct guess or when time ran out.

The set, designed by veteran Goodson-Todman art director Theodore Cooper, was predominantly blue and featured walls behind the panel and host areas tiled with illustrations representing various occupations. This set debuted when the show premiered, made the move from Broadway to Rockefeller Center in 1971, and was used until the end of the 1973–74 season.

=== Fates' Law ===
From 1973 to 1975 the name of producer Gil Fates was invoked by host Larry Blyden on every episode of What's My Line? As Blyden explained before introducing mystery guest Paul Lynde: "It's time to tell the audience and the members of the panel, especially those watching the program over the last 22 years, about a new development known as Fates' Law. Fates' Law is that any member who guesses who the mystery guest is and is wrong is then out. That's Fates' Law." Fates himself explained that the rule was named by Blyden but actually inspired by panelist Soupy Sales: "Soupy knows everybody in show business. He could identify even the most obscure comic or nightclub singer despite the most bizarre vocal disguise... [the new rule] cut down a bit on the number of instant solutions, not only from Soupy but also from other panelists who had a tendency to guess."

=== Later introductions ===
For the 1974–75 season, the show's set was changed. Designed by Ronald Baldwin, the tiles were done away with in favor of having blue walls with question marks painted on them, and the rest of the set adopted a red and yellow color palette. Also, the animated intro was done away with in favor of the show's announcer (usually Gould) offering a brief preview of one of the contestants' games.

A bright, contemporary music package was composed by Charles Fox. According to Fox's book, Killing Me Softly: My Life in Music, Bob Israel of Score Productions paid him a buyout fee of $1,000 (equal to $6,528 today) for the work. The music was performed and recorded at CTS Studios in Wembley, England, with Fox, Israel and producer Mark Goodson in attendance.

=== Announcers ===
Johnny Olson continued as announcer until a short time into the 1972–73 season, when he departed for California to begin his tenures as announcer of the revivals of The Price Is Right (which he continued to do until his passing in 1985) and I've Got a Secret (1972–73).

Following Olson's departure, a succession of guest announcers were used, including Wayne Howell, Dennis Wholey, Bob Williams, Jack Haskell and Chet Gould, with Gould eventually taking over full-time in early 1973. Gene Wood also sub-announced an episode in 1970.

=== After the death of Bennett Cerf ===
After Bennett Cerf's death in 1971, stations continued to air shows where he was a panelist resulting in confusion among some fans, who were seeing "new" episodes with Cerf long after hearing about his death. At the time, syndication involved videotape-sharing among stations that aired a series, a practice referred to as "bicycling". As such, while What's My Line? aired daily on weekdays, each station airing the show did not air the same episode on a particular day. This prompted producer Gil Fates, who recalled the situation in his book, What's My Line?: TV's Most Famous Panel Show, to send a form letter response to fans who had written complaining about the late Bennett Cerf's failure to disappear, some saying the television stations were using poor taste.

Fates explained that Cerf indeed had died, but television was practicing a time-honored tradition of celebrating one's work long after his death. As he wrote in his book, Fates knew, but did not tell viewers, about the production costs that would have gone to waste had his company acceded to the demands, some coming from station managers, to scrap the Cerf videotapes.

=== Revival's end and Blyden's death ===
The syndicated series ran for 1,320 episodes over seven seasons. An attempt at an eighth season did not get off the ground as not enough stations were willing to pick up the series for an additional year. With this in mind, Goodson-Todman offered host Blyden the hosting position on Showoffs, a charades-based game show that the company was developing for ABC's daytime lineup. He accepted and shot a pilot shortly after What's My Line? ended production. However, Blyden never got to host the series as he was killed in an automobile accident while traveling in Morocco just before taping was to begin. At the time of Blyden's death, a handful of new episodes of What's My Line? had yet to air in certain markets; by the fall of 1975, the last of these episodes had aired across the United States. Comedian Bobby Van ended up hosting Showoffs.

=== Later revival attempts ===
New versions of WML were planned as early as 1981, then in 1996, the show was going to be revived by a joint venture between All-American Television and Miramax Films (which also would have been Miramax's first foray into television game shows) as it was being described as "a new model" that would have blended the original features such as having a celebrity panel question contestants in an effort to guess their occupation and also having the panel blindfolded to guess the identity of a famous person, with contemporary "special effects" and "interactive twists". CBS reportedly committed to air six episodes for its fall 1999 schedule. However, according to Miramax TV president Billy Campbell, the deal crumbled because the network decided the show was too costly and ambitious.

In 2000, a pilot was shot with host Harry Anderson for CBS, but was later turned down in favor of the reality show Survivor. This pilot started with three panelists playing the Mystery Guest round; the guest would then be the fourth panelist for the remainder of the episode.

In 2008, another revival of the show with David Hasselhoff was planned in cooperation with FremantleMedia, which had taken over ownership of all Goodson-Todman and Mark Goodson Productions programming, that never got off the ground. In 2014, another pilot for a revival was shot to offer to stations in 2015, but it also failed to sell.

== After What's My Line? ==
=== 25th anniversary special ===
In early 1975, with production on break, it became clear to staff that the seventh season of the syndicated What's My Line? would be the last. This was the time of year when production companies and syndicators tried to sell new and continuing series to local stations. Viacom and Goodson-Todman found themselves unable to secure contracts with enough stations to justify continuing to produce the program beyond the episodes that had been videotaped on or prior to December 12, 1974. Just days after disbanding their technical crew, Mark Goodson and Bill Todman pitched the idea of a retrospective network special to celebrate the 25th anniversary of the program's CBS debut, called What's My Line at 25. The programming department at CBS turned down the idea, but ABC bought it. The special eventually was broadcast by ABC on May 28, 1975, on the late-night series ABC's Wide World of Entertainment, and is currently available for viewing at The Paley Center for Media. It made a return twice on basic-cable television as a one-time rerun on GSN (Game Show Network) on December 25, 2014, at 1:00 A.M. EST and as part of Buzzr "Lost & Found" week on September 29, 2018, at 6:30 P.M. EST.

In producing the special, the only existing master 16 millimeter prints of the original series kinescope films were removed from storage and brought to a Manhattan editing facility that Goodson-Todman Productions rented. There, company employees Gil Fates, Bob Bach, Pamela Usdan and Bill Egan worked round-the-clock for three days to compile the 90-minute special under deadline pressure from ABC network official Bob Shanks. In the process of viewing and editing the films for the special, they accidentally damaged or destroyed several kinescope films that spanned the entire run of the original series, including a few that did not make the final cut of the retrospective. In addition, some unspooled film remained on the floor after the group's rented time at the facility ran out. An April 1967 episode featuring Candice Bergen as the mystery guest was lost in its entirety, as was a June 1967 episode featuring both Betty Grable and F. Lee Bailey. Other episodes sustained only partial damage, such as a 1965 episode that is mainly damaged during the mystery guest appearance of Marian Anderson.

Mark Goodson, Arlene Francis and John Charles Daly appeared on-camera in 1975 having a conversation that introduced the old kinescope clips. Hosts of the syndicated version, Wally Bruner and Larry Blyden, were alive at the time but did not participate. With the exception of Bruner's 1969 appearance with mystery guest Gerald Ford (presented in black and white), the 25th anniversary special consisted entirely of highlights from the CBS Sunday night version of the series, that viewers likely remembered more fondly than the syndicated version.

=== That's My Line ===
In 1980, Mark Goodson began production of That's My Line which also highlighted the unusual occupations of ordinary people. However, the show was developed as a reality show and had no panel or game elements. What's My Line? announcer Johnny Olson was the announcer, and Bob Barker was the host for the show which ran for two seasons on CBS.

=== Live stage version (2004–present) ===
From November 2004 to July 2006, Jim Newman and J. Keith van Straaten produced one-hour live stage versions of the show at the ACME Comedy Theatre in Los Angeles, California, titled What's My Line? — Live On Stage. The Los Angeles version of the live show went on hiatus when van Straaten relocated to New York, then resumed in June 2007.

The production debuted in New York at the Barrow Street Theatre on March 24, 2008, for an announced run of six shows. The show is now an authorized production as it is licensed by FremantleMedia, the owners of What's My Line?. As of April 12, 2008 the New York mystery guests have been George Wendt, Moby, Natalia Paruz and Tony Roberts. Panelists have included Jonathan Ames, Joy Browne, Stephanie D'Abruzzo, Frank DeCaro, Michael Riedel, and original TV version veterans Betsy Palmer and Julia Meade. The first guest on the New York show (#75 in the production overall) was Pat Finch, who was the first guest on the first CBS episode.

In Los Angeles, panelists have included Carlos Alazraqui, Alison Arngrim, E. G. Daily, Andy Dick, Paul Goebel, Danny Goldman, Annabelle Gurwitch, Mariette Hartley, Elaine Hendrix, Marty Ingels, Cathy Ladman, David Lander, Kate Linder, Ann Magnuson, Jayne Meadows, Lee Meriwether, Patt Morrison, Rick Overton, Jimmy Pardo, Lisa Jane Persky, Nancy Pimental, Greg Proops, Mink Stole, Nicole Sullivan, Marcia Wallace, Matt Walsh, Len Wein, Wil Wheaton, Gary Anthony Williams, Debra Wilson, April Winchell, and Andy Zax.

Mystery guests have included Ed Begley Jr., Stephen Bishop, Mr. Blackwell, LeVar Burton, Brett Butler, José Canseco, Drew Carey, Andy Dick, Michael and Kitty Dukakis, Hector Elizondo, Nanette Fabray, Peter Falk, Bruce Jenner, Larry King, Kathy Kinney, Bruno Kirby, Tara Lipinski, Lisa Loeb, Shelley Long, Leonard Maltin, Rose Marie, Wink Martindale, Sally Struthers, Rip Taylor, Judy Tenuta, Alan Thicke, Dick Van Patten, Lindsay Wagner, Wil Wheaton, Noah Wyle, and Sean Young.

Panelists and guests who appeared on the original TV versions and on the stage version include Shelley Berman, Lee Meriwether, radio commentator Michael Jackson, Jayne Meadows, Nanette Fabray, Joanna Barnes, Julie Newmar, Margaret O'Brien, and Marty Ingels. Usually when such a veteran appears, the audience watches a pristine-quality DVD screening of the original kinescope film on a plasma screen. Non-celebrities include the lifelong Los Angeles-area resident who challenged the panel with her line, afterward reminiscing how 43 years earlier she had traveled to New York, where Arlene Francis identified her as a meter maid. A clip from the kinescope film was played.

In addition, the show has featured relatives of the original cast: Jill Kollmar (daughter of Dorothy Kilgallen and Richard Kollmar), Nina Daly (daughter of John Charles Daly), and Vint Cerf (co-inventor of the Internet and distant cousin of Bennett Cerf). It also included a segment in which Vint Cerf's son Bennett (named after the panelist) appeared as a guest.

=== Episode availability ===
All original series shows were recorded via kinescope onto motion picture film, but networks in the early 1950s sometimes destroyed such recordings to recover the silver content from the film. CBS regularly recycled What's My Line? kinescopes until July 1952, when Mark Goodson and Bill Todman, having realized it was occurring, offered to pay the network for a film of every broadcast. As a result, only about ten episodes exist from the first two years of the series, including the first three broadcasts.

Episode #048 from April 29, 1951, exists at the University of Wisconsin Center For Film and Theater Research.

Episode #013 (August 2, 1950), episode #084 (January 6, 1952), and episode #855 (March 26, 1967) exist at The Paley Center for Media.

An audio-only portion of episode #079 from December 2, 1951 (only has part of Game 1 with Mrs. Virginia Hendershot as the Steam Shovel Operator from Bound Brook, NJ) exists.

A portion of episode #097 (April 6, 1952), the full episode #533 (October 2, 1960), and the full milestone 800th episode (January 23, 1966) exist at the UCLA Film and Television Archive.

Only a portion of episode #191 (January 24, 1954) w/Dean Martin & Jerry Lewis as mystery guests exists, and was shown in What's My Line? at 25.

Episode #195 (February 21, 1954) only exists among collectors as a second-hand kinescope, as the official kinescope is missing from the Goodson-Todman archive.

In 2016, episode #018, aired live on October 1, 1950, was discovered by a film archivist. It was preserved and digitally converted for release.

In 2025, episode #870 from July 23, 1967 was discovered.

An audio-only excerpt from the otherwise lost episode #866 (June 18, 1967) can be heard in an LP called The Age of Television. This album, which was released by RCA Records in 1971, featured interviews with TV personalities about the medium's first 25 years. One of these interviews concerned What's My Line? and included audio from the mystery guest segment featuring Betty Grable from that now-lost episode. Lost segments include one in which panelists tried to determine that a contestant was a lawyer. He was F. Lee Bailey.

The existing kinescope films (now digitized) have subsequently been rerun on television. The series has been seen on Game Show Network at various times. The series has also been shown on Buzzr, a digital broadcast television network which is owned and operated by Fremantle.

Some episodes of the CBS radio version of the 1950s are available to visitors to the Paley Center for Media in New York City and Beverly Hills, CA. Others are at the Library of Congress in Washington, D.C., where procedures to access them are more complicated.

Alpha Video released a DVD containing four episodes on February 26, 2008. This is an unofficial release of public domain episodes, and it is unclear if an official release will occur.

A YouTube channel features all 759 fully-surviving episodes of the CBS run of What's My Line?, plus extras featuring WML regulars, various compilations of clips, and several "lost" episodes that were never included in reruns. Some are off-the-air home recordings of rebroadcasts.

Many, but not all, episodes of the 1968–75 syndicated run were preserved and have been rebroadcast, since the 1990s, on several cable and broadcast networks, notably GSN and Buzzr.

== Merchandise ==
=== Board games ===
==== Lowell (1955) ====
The original What's My Line?, based on the Daly era, was released by Lowell in 1955.

==== Whitman (1969) ====
The second version, based on the Bruner/Blyden era, was released by Whitman in 1969.

==== Endless Games (2001) ====
In order to commemorate the show's 50th Anniversary at the time, this version was released by Endless Games in 2001.

=== Record album ===
Released by Dot in 1955, audio recordings of eight "mystery guest" segments from the original Daly era can only be heard.

=== Book ===
Released by Prentice Hall in 1978, Gil Fates, the executive producer of the show, looks back over the quarter-century run of the series. The cover of the book features the photos of panelists Arlene Francis, Bennett Cerf, Dorothy Kilgallen and host John Daly.

== In popular culture ==
- The 1956 children's novel The Hundred and One Dalmatians by Dodie Smith as well as its Disney movie adaptation from 1961 included a parody of What's My Line? entitled What's My Crime? in which panelists had to figure out what a criminal's committed crime was. Walt Disney himself appeared as a mystery guest in a 1956 episode of What's My Line?
- A 1959 episode of The Art Carney Special had a parody sketch called "Whats Your Business?", featuring Art Carney as John Daly, Dick Van Dyke as mystery guest Stone Martin, and Betty Garrett as Arlene Francis.
- Woody Allen parodied What's My Line? in his 1972 film Everything You Always Wanted to Know About Sex, with the segment "What Are Sex Perverts?" featuring a game show called What's My Perversion? Appearing as panelists were Robert Q. Lewis, who had been a panelist on the original What's My Line?, and Pamela Mason, who had been a mystery guest. Jack Barry, partner of Dan Enright, both of whom had taken falls in the quiz-show scandals of the 1950s, hosted the What's My Perversion? game show, shortly before both finally returned to television in triumph with The Joker's Wild.
- In the late 1970s, the comedy show SCTV did a parody titled "What's My Shoe Size?".

== International versions ==
| Country | Name | Host(s) | Network | Premiere | Finale |
|---|---|---|---|---|---|
| Australia | What's My Line? | John Barnes | TCN-9 | 1956 | 1958 |
| Brazil | Adivinhe o que ele Faz? | Madeleine Rosay; Blota Junior | TV Tupi (Rio de Janeiro); TV Record (São Paulo do Brasil) | 1953 | 1956 |
| Canada | Chacun son métier (French) | Louis Morisset | Radio-Canada | 1954 | 1959 |
| Canada | What's My Line? (English) | Don McGowan | CTV | September 19, 1978 | 1980 |
| Chile | Quién soy yo | Enrique Bravo Menadier | Canal 13 | 1967 | 1970 |
| Chile | Quién soy yo | Enrique Bravo Menadier | TVN | 1970 | 1979 |
| Denmark | Tippejob | Otto Leisner | DR1 | 1977 | 1984 |
| Germany | Was bin ich? | Robert Lembke | ARD | January 2, 1955 | March 21, 1958 |
| Germany | Was bin ich? | Robert Lembke | ARD | February 11, 1961 | January 11, 1989 |
| Germany | Was bin ich? | Björn Hergen Schimpf | Kabel 1 | October 5, 2000 | Early 2005 |
| Indonesia | Siapa Dia | Aom Kusman; Denny Chandra; Ananda Omesh | TVRI | August 3, 1992 | June 26, 1998 |
| Indonesia | Siapa Dia | Aom Kusman; Denny Chandra; Ananda Omesh | TVRI | March 1, 2013 | August 26, 2013 |
| Indonesia | Siapa Dia | Aom Kusman; Denny Chandra; Ananda Omesh | Trans 7 | October 27, 2014 | March 1, 2015 |
| Ireland | What's My Line | Larry Gogan | RTÉ | January 4, 1970 | ? |
| Japan | 私の仕事はなんでしょう; Watashi no shigoto wa nandesho | Ichikawa Tatsuo | NHK | February 5, 1953 | May 30, 1954 |
| Lithuania | Kas tu toks? | Vytenis Sinkevicius | Lietuvos Rytas | 2010 | ? |
| Slovakia | Inkognito | Vlado Voštinár | TV JOJ | 2003; 2015 | 2007 present |
| Slovenia | Inkognito | Saša Jerković | TV SLO 1 | 2025 | present |
| South Korea | Unknown | Unknown | Unknown | 1956 | 1963 |
| Spain | Adivine su vida | Estanis González and Juan Felipe Vila San Juan | TVE | 1960 | 1961 |
| Sweden | Gissa mitt jobb | Per-Martin Hamberg | SVT | 1960 | 1960 |
| United Kingdom | What's My Line? | Eamonn Andrews | BBC Television Service | July 16, 1951 | May 13, 1963 |
| United Kingdom | What's My Line? | David Jacobs | BBC2 | August 23, 1973 | May 25, 1974 |
| United Kingdom | What's My Line? | Eamonn Andrews | ITV | March 26, 1984 | August 31, 1990 |
| United Kingdom | What's My Line? | Penelope Keith | ITV | March 26, 1984 | August 31, 1990 |
| United Kingdom | What's My Line? | Angela Rippon | ITV | March 26, 1984 | August 31, 1990 |
| United Kingdom | What's My Line? | Emma Forbes | HTV West and Meridian | September 20, 1994 | December 17, 1996 |
| Venezuela | Mi Trabajo y Yo | Renny Ottolina | RCTV | 1961 | ? |

== See also ==
- Figure It Out
- Front Page Challenge
