= The Pyx =

- Directed by: Harvey Hart
- Screenplay by: Robert Schlitt
- Based on: The Pyx by John Buell
- Produced by: Julian Roffman
- Starring: Karen Black; Christopher Plummer
- Cinematography: René Verzier
- Edited by: Ron Wisman
- Music by: Harry Freedman
- Production company: Host Productions Quebec
- Distributed by: Cinépix Film Properties; Cinerama Releasing Corporation
- Release date: September 17, 1973
- Running time: 111 minutes
- Country: Canada
- Languages: English; French
- Budget: CA$985,000–1 million

The Pyx, also known as The Hooker Cult Murders and La Lunule (French: The Moon), is a 1973 Canadian horror film directed by Harvey Hart and starring Karen Black, Christopher Plummer, Donald Pilon, and Jean-Louis Roux. Based on John Buell's 1959 novel of the same name, it follows a Montreal police detective unraveling the mystery behind the death of a heroin-addicted prostitute who died under bizarre circumstances after falling from a building. Its title refers to the pyx, a small container used by the Roman Catholic Church to hold sacramental bread.

Development of a film adaptation of Buell's novel dates back to 1964, when director Curtis Harrington expressed interest in directing a feature film for either United Artists or Columbia Pictures, and in which he considered casting several actors, including James Mason, Ursula Andress, Catherine Deneuve, and Orson Welles. The film was ultimately shot in 1972 by Hart, with Black and Plummer appearing in the principal roles. In addition to acting in the film, Black wrote and performed several original songs featured in it. It was the most expensive film ever produced in Canada at the time, with a budget of approximately $1 million.

The Pyx premiered in Canada on September 17, 1973, and opened in the United States the following week through Cinerama Releasing Corporation. It received mixed reviews from critics, with some praising the performances, narrative style, and themes, while others criticized its pacing and screenplay. It also drew a number of comparisons to Klute (1972), another film depicting a murder mystery that involves a prostitute.

The Academy of Motion Picture Arts and Sciences holds the original 35 mm film and optical sound elements of The Pyx in their archive.

== Plot ==
In Montreal, a woman named Elizabeth Lucy falls to her death from a tenement building. Police arrive on the scene and find a crucifix and a small metal pyx gripped in her hand. Widowed detective Sergeant Jim Henderson is assigned to the case, and soon learns that Elizabeth was a heroin-addicted prostitute. Henderson determines that the apartment she leapt from was unoccupied, and that the building also serves as a brothel operation. Leading up to her death, Elizabeth, a lapsed Catholic, was struggling to get her life in order.

Henderson interviews Meg Latimer, the madam of the brothel where Elizabeth was sometimes employed. Meg tells him that Elizabeth frequently worked outside the brothel against Meg's wishes, who felt it was unsafe. Upon returning to re-question Meg at the brothel the following day, Henderson finds both her and one of her employees dead, their throats slashed. He subsequently interviews the building superintendent and shows him Elizabeth's crucifix, but he refuses to speak. Later, Henderson meets with Elizabeth's gay roommate and close friend, Jimmy. Jimmy recounts his friendship with Elizabeth, whom he says was one of the few people in his life to treat him with benevolence and compassion. Jimmy recalls that Elizabeth had acted erratically the day of her death, making oblique references to a new, rich client. Henderson escorts Jimmy back to the apartment he shared with Elizabeth, but the two are ambushed by an unseen assailant who shoots Jimmy to death. A shootout follows between police and the assailant, who hides out on a docked boat.

Henderson concurrently pieces together the narrative of Elizabeth's final weeks leading up to her death: After visiting Sandra, a teenaged fellow heroin addict who is detoxing in the hospital, Elizabeth was phoned by Meg, who informed her she had given several "special" clients Elizabeth's contact information. Meg explained that these clients could offer her and Elizabeth a significant amount of money. Elizabeth met with one of the men, Keerson, a mysterious French-Canadian man who owns the building in which Meg's brothel is located. Elizabeth presumed their first meeting would be a sexual transaction, but instead Keerson merely had her disrobe and tell him her life story.

Elizabeth grew paranoid after finding herself being followed by Keerson's associates, but Meg dissuaded her fears. On the night of her death, Elizabeth arrived at the brothel for the planned "festivities" for which Meg has promised a large payoff. There, Meg drugged Elizabeth's drink. Shortly after, Keerson—in fact a Roman Catholic priest—and other elite occultists arrived to hold a Black Mass. Before the other occultists, Keerson offered Elizabeth a desecrated host from a pyx. Elizabeth took the host, but moments later Keerson pushed her from the building's rooftop to her death before the occultists could complete the ritual.

Henderson, having obtained Keerson's name from Jimmy before his death, traces Keerson to his parish, and becomes convinced he is responsible for Elizabeth's death. Upon Henderson's arrival, Keerson admits to having forsaken his faith for Satan and performed the Black Mass that culminated in Elizabeth's death. Keerson further reveals intimate knowledge about Henderson—apparently received telepathically—such as that Henderson was relieved when his wife died in a car accident. When Keerson implies that he is possessed by Satan himself, Henderson shoots him multiple times. Before Keerson dies, he tells Henderson, "You have set me free."

== Cast ==
- Karen Black as Elizabeth Lucy
- Christopher Plummer as Det. Sgt. Jim Henderson
- Donald Pilon as Det. Sgt. Pierre Paquette
- Jean-Louis Roux as Keerson
- Yvette Brind'amour as Meg Latimer
- Jacques Godin as Superintendent
- Lee Broker as Herbie Lafram
- Terry Haig as Jimmy
- Robin Gammell as Worther
- Louise Rinfret as Sandra

== Style and themes ==
It was a calculated gamble on my part to step out of the reality that I had established. I consciously wanted to suck the audience into the immediacy of it so they couldn't cop out and say, "This couldn't happen to me." I wanted to get down to the issue which became cut away from the established reality — good against evil... We're faced with a multiplicity of choices so that we're able to cop out. But when it comes down to, "Are you making an evil choice or a good choice?" — we know it.

— Director Harvey Hart on the film's theme of good versus evil in relationship to its conclusion

Hart identified the theme of good versus evil as a primary theme in the film, as well as evil being "cloaked in many different disguises. It's a bit like Pirandello." Hart conducted interviews with Montreal police officers while developing the theme, specifically a homicide detective: "I really questioned him at length before we started shooting. What came out was that cops are now put into a position where they have to play God. They're used politically, to make moral judgements. The church has copped out, the people have copped out. So they get the feeling of being God."

Writing for the horror film website Daily Dead in 2017, Scott Drebit notes that the film features "the usual themes of Catholic belief, guilt, and contrition [that] are woven throughout the film; Elizabeth is yearning for a way out of her life, but is reluctant to embrace a faith embedded but buried within. Salvation awaits her, either through the flesh of the wicked or the body of the Christ."

Hart intentionally sought to utilize a de-saturated "documentary"-like style to the film that captured "the horror of our everyday lives. This is what we're living with. To try and outdo that would have been an attempt to top myself with horror — and there are lots of people who are much, much better at that than I. I was more interested in the argument. The attempt was to shock them philosophically. That was definitely a gamble. An actor or a director has a multiplicity of choices and its only the point of view he's got that selects what for him is the right choice."

The film deliberately features a unique editing style that unfolds the dual character arcs of both Elizabeth and Sergeant Jim Henderson, the police officer investigating her death. "That was a conscious decision," Hart stated, "to make it so that you would not be conscious of time. I wanted it to feel as if there could be a love affair between this detective and this woman who was dead. That's why there were no dissolves. It was all meant to progress - the stories became dependent on one another... It had to work, because otherwise it could have been just a philosophical approach, and no meaning emotionally."

== Production ==
=== Development ===
Director Curtis Harrington originally intended to direct a film adaptation of John Buell's 1959 novel The Pyx as early as 1964; his plans to develop the project are documented in his personal papers which are held by the Academy of Motion Picture Arts and Sciences. Harrington at one point pitched the film to United Artists, intending to cast James Mason and Ursula Andress, or a "similar calibre name." Mason was reported to have selected the film to star in himself. In a February 1967 interview, Mason stated he would be appearing as the lead police detective in the film, with Harrington directing the feature on location in Canada. Later correspondence dated August 1, 1967 from Harrington to Gerald Ayers of Columbia Pictures notes that Mason was committed to appear in the project, and that Harrington also wanted to cast Catherine Deneuve and Orson Welles in the film.

Canadian director Harvey Hart, who had previously directed television episodes of Star Trek and The Alfred Hitchcock Hour, ultimately went on to direct the film several years later without Harrington's involvement, under executive producer Maxine Samuels, who had primarily worked as a television producer for the Canadian Broadcasting Corporation.

=== Casting ===
American actress Karen Black was cast in the lead role of Elizabeth Lucy, with Canadian actor Christopher Plummer portraying Sergeant Jim Henderson. By Black's account, the film's executive producer, Maxine Samuels, who was an acquaintance, contacted her and offered her the role. To prepare for the part, Black interviewed an ex-heroin addict in order to better understand the symptoms associated with opioid withdrawal. Yvette Brind'amour, who portrays the brothel madam Meg Latimer, was an experienced Montreal stage actress, and The Pyx marked her feature film debut. Hart cast her in the role as he felt "she was just a natural."

=== Filming ===
Filming was scheduled to begin in late August 1972. The film was shot entirely in Montreal by cinematographer René Verzier, and includes much French dialogue, alongside the main dialogue in English. The shoot was scheduled to last approximately nine weeks, on a budget of CA$985,000. The Canadian Film Development Committee supplied $200,000 of the budget, with an additional $350,000 (some sources state $500,000) from Hollywood-based financiers, and the remainder from private Canadian investors. Some sources cite a final budget of $1 million, making the film the most expensive film production in Canadian history at the time. According to Samuels, the Hollywood-based financiers of the project backed out two weeks before filming was to commence, after which the Royal Bank of Canada stepped in and offered to provide additional funding.

The film features the Mount Royal Cross in an aerial overhead shot during its opening credits sequence. Other locations used include the Outremont and Griffintown sections of Montreal. Additional shooting took place on the Montreal waterfront.

=== Music ===
The film's score was composed by Harry Freedman, with actress Karen Black writing and singing several original songs featured in the film. When composing the score, Freedman incorporated the use of Gregorian chants.

According to Black, the film's main theme song, "Song of Solomon", was based on the Song of Songs featured in the Bible. "They were very touching words," Black said, "and they reminded me of when someone dies and passes away, that somehow they are around anyway." Commenting on Black's songwriting, Freedman said: "one of [the songs] is a most beautiful thing. It's unusual to find contemporary pop written with such ear for melodic contours."

== Release ==
The Pyx premiered in Canada on September 17, 1973. It subsequently opened in the United States the following week, in cities such as Detroit and Rochester. It subsequently opened in Montreal on October 5, 1973, and in Los Angeles on November 2, 1973. In Australia, it was released under the alternate title Elizabeth Lucy.

=== Home media ===
The Pyx received a VHS release in the 1980s in at least three countries: Canada, the U.S. and the UK. The 1980s Canadian VHS release was issued by ASTRAL VIDEO, a division of Astral/Bellevue/Pathé, in a clamshell case with insert artwork. These releases were followed by a number of "badly-sourced" home media releases that were missing footage. Some home media distributors released the film under the alternate title The Hooker Cult Murders. Trinity Home Entertainment released the film on DVD in 2004. Scorpion Releasing issued a remastered edition of the film on DVD on October 8, 2011, featuring an audio commentary with Black moderated by Marc Edward Heuck.

== Reception ==
=== Box office ===
In its first three weeks of release in Canada, The Pyx grossed $43,000.

=== Critical response ===
==== Contemporary ====
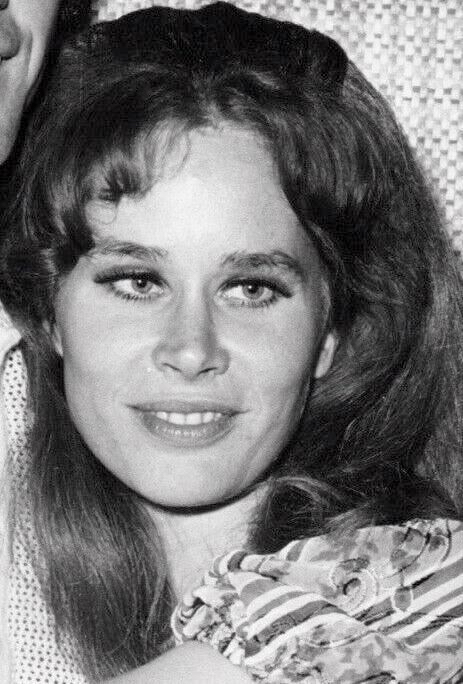
Karen Black received critical praise for her performance

Beatrice McKenna of Films in Review wrote: "Director Harvey Hart has worked well with editor Ron Wisman in using flashbacks and cutting, giving pace and excitement and a good deal of suspense to a plot which opens with the death of Karen Black... Miss Black gives a fine performance, ably assisted by Christopher Plummer, a policeman investigating her death." Edward L. Blank of The Pittsburgh Press praised Black's performance as her "best yet", also lauding the film's old-fashioned narrative style, but conceding: "Today's audiences, I fear, won't try something (for them) different. Yesterday's audiences won't leave their living rooms. And the people who made The Pyx will wonder if they should have jazzed it up with contemporary compromises."

Kevin Thomas of the Los Angeles Times praised the film, describing it as "bleak in atmosphere and hypnotic in effect... compelling entertainment that holds the viewer with mounting suspense while inviting him to contemplate the eternal struggle of good and evil, the paradoxical relationship of innocence and corruption and, finally, the nature of saintliness itself... The Pyx is a stunner." The St. Louis Post-Dispatch's Joe Pollack also gave the film a favorable review, deeming it "an outstanding motion picture" and one of the best films of the year, also praising Black's performance.

Lawrence Van Gelder of The New York Times was less laudatory, writing that "neither devotees of murder mysteries nor devotees of the occult... are likely to come away satisfied. Point the finger of guilt to a screenplay that tells less than enough about Christopher Plummer... and so much about Karen Black." The Atlanta Constitution's Gregory Jaynes was critical of the performances and summarized: "There is a very dull, labored style to this movie." Jean Dietrich of The Courier Journal similarly felt that the film's editing style was choppy, rendering it at times "incomprehensibly dull... The Pyx [is] a film whose qualities are high in slickness but low in suspense."

Several critics drew comparisons between The Pyx and Alan J. Pakula's Klute (1972), another film that centers on a murder and involves a prostitute (portrayed by Jane Fonda): Douglas Beach of the Cedar Rapids, Iowa Gazette felt The Pyx was not as strong and that its screenplay "just doesn't give [Black] the room to match Miss Fonda's Oscar-winning effort." However, Beach did commend the film for featuring "some good tense scenes, especially leading up to the Black Mass." Thomas of the Los Angeles Times similarly compared the film to Klute, citing its "incisive portrait of a prostitute," also drawing a comparison to Rosemary's Baby (1968) for its depiction of Satanism.

==== Modern assessment ====
Reviewing the film in 2017 for the Mountain Xpress, Scott Douglas awarded it four-and-a-half out of five stars, writing: "While the film bears all of the drawbacks of its exploitative origins, Black is fantastic and TV director Harvey Hart... delivers some stylish scares." Stuart Galbraith IV, reviewing the film for its 2011 DVD release, praised the film, noting "at a time when the horror genre was spiraling downward into cheap, crass exploitation, The Pyx is intelligent, well acted, and though graphically violent and sexually frank, it's anything but exploitative."

Michael Washburn of the National Review praised the film in 2020 as "haunting, eerie" and "a neglected masterpiece." He praised the film's performances, particularly Terry Haig's portrayal of Jimmy as a "nuanced, layered performance [that] is hard to forget."

Assessing the film for Cult MTL, Alex Rose writes: "The Pyx mixes dime-novel pulp with headier themes in a not particularly successful way. It's watchable in the same way that the myriad investigative cop shows currently on the air are watchable, but slower and more prone to montages set to Black's warbling. Plummer brings a giant dose of class to the film (not exactly surprising), but it remains stuck firmly between its grimy roots and its desire to be something a little more cerebral."

== Preservation of materials ==
The Academy of Motion Picture Arts and Sciences holds the film's original 35mm negatives, a composite negative, reversal negative, and the original optical sound negative in their archives. The Academy's Margaret Herrick Library also holds numerous promotional materials, manuscripts, press kits, screenplay drafts, and associated items related to the film in their collection of Curtis Harrington's papers.

== Bibliography ==
- Black, Karen; Heuck, Marc Edward (2011). The Pyx (DVD audio commentary). Scorpion Releasing. OCLC 761919687.
- Ibrányi-Kiss, Á., ed. (July 1973). "Harvey Hart's Back in Town". Cinema Canada (6): 56–59. Archived from the original on July 26, 2020 – via Athabasca University.
- Muir, John Kenneth (2011). Horror Films of the 1970s. Jefferson, North Carolina: McFarland. ISBN 9780786491568.
