= Actors Comedy Studio =

American sitcom and audition technique school

- Formation: January 17, 2011
- Type: Sitcom
- Headquarters: Los Angeles, CA
- Region served: International
- Website: actorscomedystudio.com

Actors Comedy Studio is a sitcom and audition technique acting school in Los Angeles, California. The school was founded in 2011 by Gunnar Todd Rohrbacher and Lauren Bertoni. The program primarily focuses on acting for sitcoms and audition technique.

== Class format ==
Actors Comedy Studio was created as a counterpoint to the improvisational and sketch comedy training that has "proliferated massively in Los Angeles." The program consists of three primary courses: Acting for Sitcoms, Sitcom Essentials and Sitcom Master Class. Acting for Sitcoms introduces new students to cold reading, script analysis, character development and audition technique. Sitcom Essentials focuses on script analysis, multi-cam vs. single-camera audition technique, table read, rehearsals, camera blocking, and shooting scenes in front of a live studio audience. The Sitcom Master Class is specifically designed for working actors. Admittance into the Master Class is achieved by one of three ways: referral by representation, advancement from the Acting for Sitcoms Class, or multiple film or network/cable television IMDb credits.

== Celebrity instructors ==
Actors Comedy Studios employs a variety of noted actors and casting directors as full-time and part-time faculty members. Elaine Hendrix (Sex & Drugs & Rock & Roll, The Parent Trap, Romy and Michele's High School Reunion) was a resident ACS faculty member.

== Awards and recognition ==
Co-owner Gunnar Todd Rohrbacher and Actors Comedy Studio have been repeatedly recognized for their work by the Readers Choice Awards by Backstage West. In 2011, Gunnar was Runner-Up for 'Favorite On-Camera Teacher', 'Favorite Comedy Teacher', and 'Favorite Audition Technique Teacher'. Actors Comedy Studio was recently voted by Backstage as one of the top "9 Great Places to Study Comedy in Los Angeles."

Gunnar was interviewed by Press Pass LA, an entertainment news source covering celebrity news, red carpet events, and up & coming talent. The interview focused on the growth of Actors Comedy Studio, the rise of sitcoms in television, and refinement techniques implemented in their class structure.
