= Beat the Geeks =

US television program

- Beat the Geeks Season 1 title card
- Genre: Game show
- Created by: Mark Cronin; James Rowley
- Directed by: Richard DiPirro (credited as R. Brian DiPirro)
- Presented by: J. Keith van Straaten (Season 1); Blaine Capatch (Season 2); Tiffany Bolton
- Starring: See below
- Composer: Jon Ernst
- Country of origin: United States
- No. of seasons: 2
- No. of episodes: 130 (1 unaired during original broadcast)

Production
- Executive producer: Mark Cronin
- Producers: Richard G. King; Beth Greenbaum
- Production locations: Hollywood Center Studios; Hollywood, California
- Camera setup: Multi-camera
- Running time: 22 minutes
- Production companies: Mindless Entertainment; Fox Television Studios; Comedy Partners

Original release
- Network: Comedy Central
- Release: November 7, 2001 – October 7, 2002

Beat the Geeks is an American television game show that aired on Comedy Central from 2001 to 2002. The show was rerun on The Comedy Network in Canada.

On the show, contestants face off in trivia matches against a panel of three resident "geeks" who are well-versed in music, movies, and television, as well as a fourth guest geek with an alternate area of expertise which varies from episode to episode. The object is to outsmart the geek at their own subject; as a handicap, the geeks are given questions of considerably greater difficulty than the contestants. Beat the Geeks was taped at the Hollywood Center Studios in Hollywood, California.

== Rules ==
=== First round ===
In the first season, the three contestants competed against each other to answer eight toss-up questions, two from each category; the geeks did not play in this round. The first four questions (one per category) were worth 5 points each, and the second four were worth 10 points each. Occasionally, the geeks would give a fact after the question.

In the second season, four pairs of questions were asked, one in each geek's category. The first question of each pair was a toss-up among the contestants, worth 10 points. The contestant who answered correctly then played the second toss-up against the relevant Geek. If the contestant answered correctly or if the Geek missed, the contestant scored 10 points; if the contestant missed or if the geek answered correctly, the contestant lost 5 points.

In both seasons, the lowest scorer at the end of the round was eliminated. In the event of a tie for low score, a question with a numerical answer was asked and the contestants wrote down their guesses. The one who came closer to the correct answer without going over remained in the game; if both were over, the closer guess won.

=== Second round ===
The remaining two contestants each play a head-to-head challenge against the geek of their choice in order to win the geek's medal. In season 1, if the contestants begin the round tied, they are asked a toss-up question to determine who plays first. In season 2, the winner of a coin toss during a commercial break determined who plays first. Otherwise, the player with the most points started. Once a geek has lost that medal to a contestant, that geek cannot be challenged again until the final round.

==== Season 1 ====
In the first season, four questions are asked, alternating between the contestant and the geek, whose questions are much more difficult. If the geek gives a wrong answer, the contestant wins the challenge, scores points, and gets to wear the geek's medal for the rest of the game. If the contestant misses a question, the challenge ends and the opponent may score 10 points by giving the correct answer. On occasion, if a challenge ends due to the contestant missing the question, the challenged geek will be asked the more difficult question to show off.

If all four questions are answered correctly, a "geek-off" is played to decide the challenge. The player must name as many items in a given category as possible in 15 seconds; the geek must then do the same in a much harder category. If the geek cannot come up with more answers, the contestant wins the challenge, with ties going to the contestant.

Resident geeks' medals are worth 20 points each, while a guest geek's medal awards 30.

==== Season 2 ====
A maximum of four questions were asked, as in season 1, but when the contestant missed a question the geek must answer it correctly to win the challenge; the opponent does not get a chance to score from a missed question. A miss by the geek still results in a victory for the contestant. If both sides miss the same questions or if all four questions are asked, a "geek-off" is played. On occasion, if the geek ends the challenge by answering the contestant's question correctly, they are given the harder question to show off.

Resident and guest geek medals award 20 and 40 points, respectively.

=== Third round ===
The third round starts with two more head-to-head challenges, and the trailing player, or the coin toss winner in the event of a tie starts. Gameplay is the same as in the second round, with all medals worth 20 more points (40/50 in season 1, 40/60 in season 2).

After these challenges are over, the "geek-qualizer" is played to decide a winner with the trailing contestant going first; in the event of a tie, the coin toss winner decides to go first or second. A list of titles is read to the contestant, who must decide whether each is related to movies, music, or TV. The list continues until the contestant gives an incorrect answer, fails to answer within two seconds, or exhausts the list. Then, if they have tied or exceeded their opponent's score, their opponent plays their own geek-qualizer round with the same rules. The player with the most points after the geek-qualizer advances to the final round. If there is a tie, a numerical tiebreaker question is asked; the winner is the player who comes closer to the correct answer without going over. When a contestant's turn is over, the geek that relates to the last title read explains it. Correct answers are worth 10 points each, with a maximum of 15 items in season 1, and 16 in season 2.

=== Final round ===
In the final round, the contestant chooses one of the four geeks to challenge. The contestant and geek alternate questions, beginning with the contestant. Each turn, the host gives a category, then the player chooses whether to answer a 1-point (easiest), 2-point (harder), or 3-point (hardest) question; the Geek may not choose a point value lower than the contestant's previous question. If answered correctly, they earn the number of points chosen; otherwise there is no penalty. The first player to reach 7 points wins; if the contestant wins they are awarded $5,000 worth of prizes related to the category of geek they challenged for the final round.

== Geeks ==
=== Regular geeks ===
The host would mention in most episodes in season 1 that any geek whose performance began to slip could be suspended from the show and replaced by a new geek.

- Marc Edward Heuck – Movie geek
- Paul Goebel – TV geek
- Andy Zax – Music geek (most of seasons 1 and 2)
- Michael Jolly – Music geek (part of season 1)
- Michael Farmer – Music geek (part of season 2)

=== Guest geeks ===
==== Seasons 1 & 2 ====
- Mike Bracken – Horror geek (10 episodes)
- Holly Chandler – South Park geek (10 episodes)
- Ken Crosby – James Bond geek (10 episodes)
- Gabriel Köerner – Star Trek geek (15 episodes)
- Alan Korsunsky – Comic book geek (10 episodes)
- Antonio Lopez – Simpsons geek (10 episodes)
- John Steverding – Playboy geek (10 episodes)

==== Season 1 ====
- Karen Brown – Michael Jackson geek (5 episodes)
- Ivy Shantelle Hover – Sopranos geek (5 episodes)
- Kathy Pillsbury – Star Wars geek (5 episodes)
- Melanie Prudhomme – Friends geek (5 episodes)
- Paul Schmeltzer – Hip-hop geek (5 episodes)

==== Season 2 ====
- Dan Blau – Beatles geek (5 episodes)
- Krisztian Boldis – Star Wars geek (5 episodes)
- Karla De Trinidad – Friends geek (5 episodes)
- Dana Gould – Planet of the Apes geek (1 episode)
- Rudy Higa – Wrestling geek (1 episode)
- Tim Lakin – Toy geek (5 episodes)
- Christian Malmin – Kiss geek (1 episode)
- Mr. Skin – nudity in Movie geek (2 episodes)
- Greg Snyder – Saturday morning geek (5 episodes)

== Guest stars ==
=== Season 1 ===
- Neferteri Shepherd
- Jerry Springer
- Jane Wiedlin
- Wil Wheaton

=== Season 2 ===
- Coolio
- Susan Olsen
- Jimmie Walker
- Devin DeVasquez
- Hugh Hefner
- Lloyd Kaufman
- Peter Noone

== Hosts ==
J. Keith van Straaten hosted the first season and comedian Blaine Capatch hosted the second season. Tiffany Bolton was the co-host for both seasons.

== Reception ==
Reception about the show was mixed. The student newspaper at the University of Miami panned the show, calling it too easy and criticizing van Straaten's hosting skills. The Los Angeles Times was more charitable, calling the show "wackily entertaining" and referring to the panelists as "quirkily amusing as they are knowledgeable".
