= Gunnar Todd Rohrbacher =

- Born: May 4, 1968 (age 58); San Diego, California, U.S.
- Occupations: Actor, acting coach, writer, director, producer, comedian
- Years active: 1990–present
- Website: Actorscomedystudio.com

Gunnar Todd Rohrbacher (born May 4, 1968) is an American acting coach, writer, director, producer, actor and comedian. He founded Actors Comedy Studio in Los Angeles, California, and is a staff writer for Backstage West. He is a graduate of the Warner Bros. Comedy Writer's Program and is featured in Judy Kerr's Hollywood Survival Guide: Acting is Everything.

== Career ==
Rohrbacher is an alumnus of the ACME Comedy Theater in Hollywood, California, where he was a member of the main company. As a faculty member, he taught improv, developed sketch writing courses, and directed the school's performance labs.

In 2011, he opened Actors Comedy Studio with Lauren Marie Bertoni. ACS focuses on acting for sitcoms and on-camera audition techniques.

Rohrbacher designed and taught the Acting for Animators program for Disney Animation Studios. He was a character consultant on two of Disney's feature films: Meet the Robinsons and Bolt. He consulted for Klasky Csupo Animation Studios. He also wrote animation for DreamWorks and Sony Animation's Mega Babies.

As an actor, Rohrbacher starred in two pilots for NBC: Prime Time Comedy, produced by George Schlatter, and the semi-improvised sitcom The Weekend. He also appeared in Boutonniere, starring Zachary Quinto and Wendy McLendon-Covey, which was the 2009 24FPS International Short Film Festival Silver Medal winner.

== Filmography ==
Year	Title	Role	Notes
1998	Prime Time Comedy	Various	Pilot
2005	The Weekend	Actor	Pilot
2009	The Boutonniere	Doll Show Host	Short film
2009	Numbers	Jeremy	Short film
2011	Jon Benjamin Has A Van	Prison Inmate	Episode: "The Curse"
2011	Girl Parts	Super Fan	Episodes: "Pilot" & "Finale"
2013	Happy Endings	Little Guy	Episode: "The Ballad of Lon Sarofsky"
2014	The Tiffany and Erin Show	Dan	1 episode
2014	Chasing Denzel	Casting Director	Short film
2016	Heidi	Friend #3	
2016	Aged	Rex	
2018–2019	Law Law Land the Series	Mr. Stavinski	
