= Paul Goble =

Paul Goble could refer to:

- Paul Goble (writer and illustrator) (1933–2017), British-American children's author
- Paul A. Goble (born 1949), American scholar of Russian studies

== See also ==
- Paul Gobeil (born 1942), Canadian businessman and politician
- Paul Goebel (disambiguation)
