= Terry Haig =

Canadian actor

Terry Haig is a Canadian actor, radio host, and journalist. He had a featured role in the 1973 film, The Pyx and hosted sports radio programs in Montreal during the 1990s.

== Early life ==
Haig was born in Montreal and grew up in Georgeville, Quebec and suburban New York City. His father was American, but Haig renounced his American citizenship during the Vietnam War. He attended Ohio Wesleyan University and was a sportswriter for the school newspaper. He also worked as a reporter for The Gazette during his summer breaks. After earning his BA in English, he moved to Ibiza and worked on a novel. After a year, he decided to return to New York to study acting under Lee Strasberg. He then returned to Montreal, where he worked as a bouncer and took part in the National Film Board of Canada's actor's workshop program.

== Acting ==
Haig had a small role in Fortune and Men's Eyes. He then played a Department of National Revenue investigator in a NFB film called The Sloane Affair. He also had a role in George Kaczender's U-Turn. In 1973, Haig had a featured role in The Pyx, a thriller starring Karen Black and Christopher Plummer. In the 1974 Canadian federal election, Haig was the New Democratic Party candidate in Shefford. He finished a distant fourth place with 2.42% of the vote. During the late 1970s, he appeared in advertisements for the Office québécois de la langue française.

In 2004, Haig appeared as a U.S. Customs and Border Protection inspector in The Terminal, as a Mayo Clinic doctor in Bittersweet Memories, and as a United States Senator in The Aviator. The following year, he had a role in the miniseries Human Trafficking. He also had a supporting role in I'm Not There.

== Radio ==
A lack of full-time acting work led Haig to return to journalism. He covered the Montreal Expos for the short-lived Montreal Daily News. From 1991 to 1993, he was a baseball reporter for CJAD. He then moved to CIQC, where he hosted the Expos postgame show and was the news anchor on Mitch Melnick's drive time program. He later received his own afternoon talk show. In 1994, his talk show was canceled due to low ratings and he was replaced on the post-game show due to pressure from team management. Haig left CIQC later that year to replace CBMT sports reporter Tom Harrington. In 1996, Haig returned to radio as the host of The Right Call, a sports call-in show on CKGM that ran from 5 to 7 p.m. weekdays. The program was canceled later that year and replaced with syndicated programing. He returned to CIQC as Mitch Melnick's sidekick. He also wrote for the alternative weekly newspapers Hour and the Montreal Mirror. He was the colour analyst for the Montreal Expos radio broadcasts during the 2001 and 2002 seasons.
