= Jim Newman (actor) =

American actor, writer, producer and director

- Born: Stevens Point, Wisconsin
- Occupation: television actor

Jim Newman is an American actor, writer, producer, and director. Born in Stevens Point, Wisconsin, he lives in Burbank, California. In 1998, he won a Drama-Logue Award.

He has written animation scripts for Casper, Toonsylvania, and Mega Babies.

Jim was also the director and producer of the live stage version of What's My Line? in Hollywood.
