= J. Keith van Straaten =

American actor

- Born: June 16, 1971 (age 55); Chicago, Illinois, U.S.
- Years active: 2001–present

J. Keith van Straaten (born June 16, 1971) is an American actor, host, and writer. He was born in Chicago, Illinois, and is of Dutch heritage.

On TV, he hosted the first season of the Comedy Central game show Beat the Geeks in 2001 and began appearing as a panelist on VH1's Best Week Ever in 2006. He frequently appears as a commentator on E! Entertainment Television on shows such as: 25 Most Memorable Swimsuit Moments and Wildest Spring Break Moments. He also appeared in Season 2, Episode 10 of Curb Your Enthusiasm (2001).

Van Straaten has worked with Yahoo! on a number of projects. During the 2007 and 2008 Academy Award season, he authored a blog on Yahoo! Movies covering events and information up to and including the awards show. He also wrote their 2007 Summer and Holiday Movie Guides. The 28 short Yahoo! Answers On The Street segments were also hosted by van Straaten.

He briefly hosted a weekend internet radio show in 2007, the Game Show Radio Game Show.

Van Straaten has appeared in several television commercials, including those for McDonald's, Nike, and Cheez-It. He hosted the pilot for the US edition of Balls of Steel.

He produced and hosted a live-on-stage revival of What's My Line? at the Barrow Street Theatre in New York City, following its run at ACME Comedy Theatre in Los Angeles, California. He also created puzzles and served as a writer on NPR's quiz show "Ask Me Another". Also, he produced and hosted "The Fix-Up Show," a live-on-stage matchmaking show at the Triad Theater in New York City.

Currently he hosts the Maximum Fun podcast "Go Fact Yourself" alongside comedian Helen Hong.
