= Marc Edward Heuck =

American actor)

- Occupation: Actor
- Years active: 2001–present
- Notable work: Beat the Geeks

Marc Edward Heuck is an American actor, best known for his role as the Movie Geek on the Comedy Central game show Beat the Geeks.

== Filmography ==
Film

Year	Title	Actor	Writer	Producer
2008	The Killing of a Chinese Cookie	Yes	No	No
2014	Out of Print	Yes	No	No
2015	Samurai Cop 2: Deadly Vengeance	No	No	Yes
2017	Scumbag	Yes	No	No
2020	Choke	No	No	Yes
2023	Masters of the Grind	Yes	No	No

Television

Year	Title	Episode	Actor	Writer	Producer
2001	Beat the Geeks	Seasons 1-2	Yes	No	No
2002	Win Ben Stein's Money	June 24 Ep.	Yes	No	No
2014	The Director's Chair	Season 1	No	No	Yes
