= Paul Goebel (television personality) =

American television personality

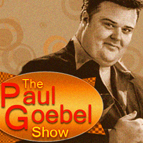
- Born: 1968 (age 57–58); Flint, Michigan, U.S.
- Education: University of Arizona
- Occupation: Actor
- Years active: 1993–present

Paul Goebel (born 1968) is an American actor.

== Early life ==
Goebel was born in Flint, Michigan, and graduated from the University of Arizona in 1992.

== Acting career ==
=== Beat the Geeks ===
He starred on the game show Beat the Geeks as the TV Geek. On the show, contestants face off in trivia matches against "geeks" who are well-versed in music, movies, and television.

=== Other roles ===
Paul has been a contestant on the game shows Race to Escape, Greed and Win Ben Stein's Money. He has also guest starred on several television series, including Curb Your Enthusiasm, Will and Grace, Boston Common, and Roswell.

He also had minor roles on numerous movies, including Not Another Teen Movie.

== Podcast ==
Paul hosts his own podcast, "The Paul Goebel Show." In each episode, Paul invites a different comedian onto the show to discuss television, politics, and any other topic they decide on.

Paul has appeared on other podcasts, such as "Never Not Funny," “Fandom Planet” and "Battleship Pretension".
